= List of shipwrecks in December 1942 =

The list of shipwrecks in December 1942 includes all ships sunk, foundered, grounded, or otherwise lost during December 1942.

== 1 December ==
List of shipwrecks: 1 December 1942
Ship	State	Description
Anna Maria Gualdi	Italy	The cargo ship was severely damaged by an onboard explosion at Palermo, Sicily. She was a total loss.
HMAS Armidale	Royal Australian Navy	World War II: The Bathurst-class corvette was torpedoed and sunk in the Timor Sea south off Timor, Netherlands East Indies (10°00′S 126°30′E) by Japanese aircraft with the loss of 60 Dutch troops and 40 crew. Twenty-two survivors were rescued by Kalgoorlie (Royal Australian Navy).
Città di Trapani	Italy	World War II: The hospital ship struck a mine and sank in the Mediterranean Sea east of "Canis" with the loss of five lives.
Cortellazzo	Italy	World War II: The cargo ship was captured in the Atlantic Ocean west of Spain (44°00′N 20°00′W) by HMS Redoubt (Royal Navy) and HMAS Quickmatch (Royal Australian Navy) and was scuttled after all passengers and crew had been rescued.
Ioannis P. Goulandris	Greece	The cargo ship collided with Intrepido (Panama) and was abandoned in the North Atlantic Ocean off New York City, United States (40°15′N 73°45′W). Her 31 crew were rescued by Intrepido. Ioannis P. Goulandris sank between 1 and 3 December. She was on a voyage from the Hampton Roads, Virginia, to Searsport, Maine, United States.
HMT Jasper	Royal Navy	World War II: Convoy PW 256: The naval trawler was torpedoed and sunk in the English Channel by S 81 (Kriegsmarine) with the loss of eleven of her crew.
Tabarca	Italy	World War II: The coaster struck a mine and sank in the Mediterranean Sea off Vada. There were 229 or 233 dead and only eight survivors.
Trevalgan	United Kingdom	World War II: The cargo ship was torpedoed and sunk in the Atlantic Ocean south east of Trinidad (9°40′N 59°15′W) by U-508 (Kriegsmarine). Her 43 crew were rescued by USS PC-572 (United States Navy).
V-135 Togo	Regia Marina	World War II: The guard ship was torpedoed and sunk in the Mediterranean Sea north of Corsica, France by HMS Ursula (Royal Navy). Her sixteen crew survived; three were wounded.
UJ 1206	Kriegsmarine	The MOB-FD-class submarine chaser collided with M 29 (Kriegsmarine) and sank in the Baltic Sea off Gogland, Soviet Union.

== 2 December ==
List of shipwrecks: 2 December 1942
Ship	State	Description
Amarylis	Panama	World War II: The cargo ship was torpedoed and sunk in the Indian Ocean (28°14′S 33°24′E) by U-181 (Kriegsmarine) with the loss of 29 of her 37 crew.
Askild	Norway	World War II: Convoy CL 61: The cargo ship ran aground at Chance Cove, Dominion of Newfoundland and was wrecked with the loss of two of her 22 crew.
Aspromonte	Italy	World War II: Battle of Skerki Bank: The train ferry was shelled and sunk in the Mediterranean Sea by HMS Aurora, HMS Argonaut, HMS Quentin, HMS Sirius, (all Royal Navy) and HMAS Quiberon (Royal Australian Navy) with the loss of 41 or 42 of her crew.
Aventino	Italy	World War II: Battle of Skerki Bank: The cargo ship was shelled and sunk in the Mediterranean Sea by HMS Aurora, HMS Argonaut, HMS Quentin, HMS Sirius, (all Royal Navy) and HMAS Quiberon (Royal Australian Navy). Between 800 and 900 of the troops and crew aboard were killed; there were less than 300 survivors.
Besholt	Norway	World War II: The cargo ship was torpedoed and sunk in the Atlantic Ocean (3°20′N 30°20′W) by U-174 (Kriegsmarine) with the loss of fourteen of the 42 people aboard.
City of Bath	United Kingdom	World War II: The cargo ship was torpedoed and sunk in the Atlantic Ocean north west of Georgetown, British Guiana (9°29′N 59°35′W) by U-508 (Kriegsmarine) with the loss of three of her 83 crew. Survivors were rescued by City of Dunkirk (United Kingdom) or reached land in their lifeboat.
USAT Coamo	United States Army	World War II: The passenger ship was torpedoed and sunk in the Atlantic Ocean 150 nautical miles (280 km) off the coast of Ireland (48°45′N 23°30′W) by U-604 (Kriegsmarine) with the loss of all 186 people on board (16 troops, 37 gunners, and 133 crew), either in the sinking or on rafts during a storm the next day.
Folgore	Regia Marina	World War II: Battle of Skerki Bank: The Folgore-class destroyer was sunk in the Strait of Sicily by HMS Aurora, HMS Argonaut, HMS Quentin, HMS Sirius, (all Royal Navy) and HMAS Quiberon (Royal Australian Navy). One hundred and twenty-four of her crew were killed, 100 were rescued.
KT 1	Kriegsmarine	World War II: Battle of Skerki Bank: The transport ship was shelled and sunk in the Mediterranean Sea by HMS Aurora, HMS Argonaut, HMS Quentin, HMS Sirius, (all Royal Navy) and HMAS Quiberon (Royal Australian Navy). There were no survivors.
Lupo	Regia Marina	World War II: Convoy C: The Spica-class torpedo boat was shelled and sunk in the Mediterranean Sea 20 nautical miles (37 km) off the Kerkennah Islands, Tunisia by HMS Janus, HMS Javelin, HMS Jervis and HMS Kelvin (all Royal Navy) with loss of her captain and 134 crew members. There were 29 survivors.
Puccini	Italy	World War II: Battle of Skerki Bank: The cargo ship was torpedoed and sunk in the Mediterranean Sea by HMS Seraph (Royal Navy). More than 500 troops and crew died.
HMS Quentin	Royal Navy	World War II: Battle of Skerki Bank: The Q-class destroyer was sunk in the Mediterranean Sea north of Algiers, Algeria by Luftwaffe and/or Regia Aeronautica aircraft with the loss of eleven of her crew. Another subsequently died of wounds sustained.
Sacro Cuore	Italy	World War II: The cargo ship was torpedoed and sunk in the Mediterranean Sea off Susa, Libya by HMS Umbra (Royal Navy) with the loss of three of her 49 crew.
Veloce	Italy	World War II: Convoy C: The cargo ship was shelled and sunk in the Mediterranean Sea 20 nautical miles (37 km) off the Kerkennah Islands by HMS Janus, HMS Javelin, HMS Jervis and HMS Kelvin (all Royal Navy) with the loss of 63 of her 135 crew.
Tugboat Admiral	United States	The American tugboat capsized and sank while towing the barge Cleveco during a fierce winter gale. Fourteen people died.
Cleveco	United States	The barge sank with the loss of all 18 hands during a fierce winter gale in Lake Erie while being towed by the tugboat Admiral, which also sank.

== 3 December ==
List of shipwrecks: 3 December 1942
Ship	State	Description
Audace	Italy	World War II: Convoy C: The cargo ship was torpedoed and sunk in the Mediterranean Sea by British aircraft. There were 28 dead and twelve survivors.
RFA Belita	Royal Fleet Auxiliary	World War II: The tanker was torpedoed, shelled and sunk in the Indian Ocean (11°29′N 55°00′E) by I-29 (Imperial Japanese Navy). Her 30 crew survived.
Empire Dabchick	United Kingdom	World War II: Convoy ON 146: The Design 1019 ship straggled behind the convoy. She was torpedoed and sunk in the Atlantic Ocean (43°00′N 58°17′W) by U-183 (Kriegsmarine). All 47 crew were lost.
Gatinais	United Kingdom	World War II: The coaster was torpedoed and sunk in the English Channel by S 82 (Kriegsmarine). Seven of her crew and a gunner were killed.
Ha-8	Imperial Japanese Navy	The midget submarine was swamped off Cape Esperance, Guadalcanal, Solomon Islands, and was scuttled. Her two crew made it to shore.
Menes	Kriegsmarine	World War II: Convoy C: The transport ship was torpedoed and sunk in the Mediterranean Sea off the coast of Libya by British aircraft. Also reported as striking a mine and sinking 7 nautical miles (13 km) east of Cani Island, Tunisia.
Minerva	Italy	World War II: Convoy C: The cargo ship was torpedoed and sunk in the Mediterranean Sea east of Djerba, Tunisia by British aircraft with the loss of 21 of her 47 crew.
Palmaiola	Italy	World War II: Convoy C: The cargo shipwas torpedoed and sunk in the Mediterranean Sea east of Djerba by British aircraft with the loss of 25 of her 42 crew.
HMS Penylan	Royal Navy	World War II: Convoy PW 257: The Hunt-class destroyer was torpedoed and sunk in the English Channel 5 nautical miles (9.3 km) south of Start Point, Devon by S-115 (Kriegsmarine) with the loss of 41 of her 168 crew.
Sainte Marguerite II	France	World War II: The cargo ship was sunk in the Mediterranean Sea, off San Remo, Italy, by HMS Ursula (Royal Navy) using gunfire and later scuttling charges. Her crew survived; two of them were captured by HMS Ursula.
Solon II	United Kingdom	World War II: The cargo ship was torpedoed and sunk in the Atlantic Ocean north east of Georgetown, British Guiana (7°45′N 56°30′W) with the loss of 75 of her 82 crew.
Wallsend	United Kingdom	World War II: The cargo ship was torpedoed and sunk in the Atlantic Ocean north of the Cape Verde Islands, Portugal (20°08′N 25°50′W by U-552 (Kriegsmarine) with the loss of four of her 41 crew. Her captain was taken on board U-552 as a prisoner of war, other survivors sailed their lifeboats.lifeboat 200 miles to San Antonio, Cape Verde Islands

== 4 December ==
List of shipwrecks: 4 December 1942
Ship	State	Description
Muzio Attendolo	Regia Marina	World War II: The Condottieri-class cruiser was bombed and sunk in Naples Harbour by Consolidated B-24 Liberator aircraft of the United States 9th Air Force. Between 99 and 188 men were killed depending on sources.
Sir Charles Elliot	Union of South Africa	The rescue tug grounded just north of Rocky Point and was wrecked with the loss of two of her crew.
Nutfield	United Kingdom	The cargo ship collided with Bornholm (United Kingdom and was severely damaged. She was beached at South Shields, County Durham and was abandoned by her crew. She was refloated on 22 December and towed into the River Tyne. Although declared a constructive total loss, she was repaired and returned to service as Empire Nutfield.
Thomas A. Edison	United States	The Liberty ship was grounded on Vuata Vatoa, Fiji Islands. She was destroyed in a hurricane on 1–2 January 1943 along with USS Grebe (United States Navy) which had herself became grounded attempting to tow her off the beach.
HMS Traveller	Royal Navy	World War II: The T-class submarine struck a mine and sank off Taranto, Italy with the loss of all 65 crew.

== 5 December ==
List of shipwrecks: 5 December 1942
Ship	State	Description
HMT Bengali	Royal Navy	The naval trawler was destroyed by fire at Lagos, Nigeria with the loss of a crew member when a benzene spill from Athelvictor (United Kingdom) ignited.
HMT Canna	Royal Navy	The Isles-class trawler was destroyed by fire at Lagos with the loss of twelve of her crew when a benzene spill from Athelvictor (United Kingdom) ignited.
Graz	Germany	World War II: The hospital ship struck a mine and sank in the Mediterranean Sea north east of Bizerte, Tunisia with the loss of 53 lives (39 Greeks, thirteen Germans and an Italian).
Hardhaus	Norway	The coaster capsized and sank in the North Sea off Lindesnes, Norway. Her eight crew were rescued.
HMT Spaniard	Royal Navy	The naval trawler was destroyed by fire at Lagos with the loss of her two crew when a benzene spill from Athelvictor (United Kingdom) ignited.
Teesbank	United Kingdom	World War II: The cargo ship was torpedoed and sunk in the Atlantic Ocean (3°33′N 29°35′W) by U-128 (Kriegsmarine) with the loss of one of her 62 crew. Her captain was taken on board U-128 as a prisoner of war. Other survivors were rescued by Bessemer (United States) and East Wales (United Kingdom).

== 6 December ==
List of shipwrecks: 6 December 1942
Ship	State	Description
USS Grebe	United States Navy	The fleet tug, a former Lapwing-class minesweeper, ran aground at Vuata Vatoa, Fiji Islands. She was wrecked in a hurricane on 1 January 1943.
Henry Stanley	United Kingdom	World War II: The cargo ship was torpedoed and sunk in the Atlantic Ocean 580 nautical miles (1,070 km) northwest of the Azores, Portugal (40°35′N 39°40′W) by U-103 (Kriegsmarine). Her captain was taken aboard U-103 as a prisoner of war. The rest of the 52 crew and eleven passengers took to the lifeboats but were not seen again.
HMS LCM 98	Royal Navy	World War II: The landing craft mechanized was sunk off Benghazi, Libya (32°10′N 19°35′E) by cannon fire from two Junkers Ju 88 aircraft of the Luftwaffe. There were no casualties.
Porfido	Regia Marina	World War II: The Acciaio-class submarine was torpedoed and sunk in the Mediterranean Sea 90 miles (140 km) north-north-east of Bône, Algeria (38°10′N 08°35′E) by the submarine HMS Tigris (Royal Navy) with the loss of 44 of her 48 crew. Survivors were captured by HMS Tigris.
Serooskerk	Netherlands	World War II: The cargo ship was torpedoed and sunk in the Atlantic Ocean (41°27′N 39°42′W) by U-155 (Kriegsmarine) with the loss of all 83 crew.
V 6116 Ubier, and V 6117 Cherusker	Kriegsmarine	World War II: The Polerstern-class naval whalers were mined and sunk in the Porsangerfjord (70°56′N 26°02′E). At least 35 sailors were killed.

== 7 December ==
List of shipwrecks: 7 December 1942
Ship	State	Description
Ceramic	United Kingdom	World War II: The ocean liner was torpedoed and sunk in the Atlantic Ocean west of the Azores, Portugal (40°30′N 40°20′W) by U-515 (Kriegsmarine) with the loss of 656 of the 657 people on board. The survivor was taken on board U-515 as a prisoner of war.
Ha-38	Imperial Japanese Navy	World War II: The midget submarine torpedoed the already beached USS Alchiba (United States Navy) off Lunga Point, Guadalcanal, Solomon Islands, and went missing after she was depth charged by USS SC-477 (United States Navy). A Japanese coastwatcher reported a midget submarine being chased by two destroyers in the direction of Tulagi.
Hino Maru No. 3	Imperial Japanese Navy	World War II: The Mikage Maru No. 18-class auxiliary transport (4,391 GRT) was torpedoed, broke in two, and sunk in the South China Sea 135 miles (217 km) west south west of Minami, Iwo Jima, Volcano Islands (23°30′N 138°20′E) by USS Kingfish (United States Navy) with the loss of nineteen of her 45 crew. Survivors were rescued by the auxiliary hospital ship Takasago Maru (Imperial Japanese Navy) on 11 December.
Kromwijk	Germany	World War II: The ancient houseboat from the Rhine, taken over in 1940 and converted in Rotterdam was working for the Organisation Todt, carrying a cargo of bricks. She was attacked by Allied aircraft and sunk south of Jersey, Channel Islands (49°09′N 02°12′W).
Peter Mærsk	United Kingdom	World War II: Convoy ON 149: The cargo ship was torpedoed and sunk in the Atlantic Ocean 460 nautical miles (850 km) west of the Azores (39°47′N 41°00′W) by U-185 (Kriegsmarine) with the loss of all 62 crew.
Saronikos	Greece	World War II: The cargo ship was torpedoed and sunk about 55 miles (89 km) south of Inhambane, Portuguese East Africa in the Indian Ocean (24°46′S 35°30′E) by U-177 (Kriegsmarine) Her master, 28 crew members and two gunners were lost. The two surviving crew members made landfall after nine days near Chai Chai.

== 8 December ==
List of shipwrecks: 8 December 1942
Ship	State	Description
Empire Spenser	United Kingdom	World War II: Convoy HX 217: The tanker, on her maiden voyage, was torpedoed and sunk in the Atlantic Ocean south east of Cape Farewell, Greenland (57°04′N 36°01′W) by U-524 (Kriegsmarine) with the loss of one of her 58 crew. Survivors were rescued by Perth (United Kingdom). Empire Spenser was on a voyage from Curaçao, Curaçao and Dependencies to the Stanlow Oil Refinery, Cheshire.
Eugenie Livanos	Greece	World War II: The cargo ship was shelled and sunk in the Indian Ocean 300 nautical miles (560 km) south east of Madagascar by Michel (Kriegsmarine). 11 of her 27 crew were killed; fifteen of the survivors were made prisoners of war.
Heinan Maru	Japan	World War II: The ship was torpedoed and sunk in the Pacific Ocean by USS Gar (United States Navy).
James McKay	United States	World War II: Convoy HX 217: The cargo ship straggled behind the convoy. She was torpedoed and sunk in the Atlantic Ocean (57°50′N 23°10′W) by U-600 (Kriegsmarine) with the loss of all 62 crew.
Koçiboglu	Turkey	World War II: The sailing vessel was sunk in the Bosphorus by D-5 (Soviet Navy).
La Coubre	(France) Vichy French Navy	The auxiliary minesweeper was lost on this date.
Smerch	Soviet Navy	World War II: The patrol boat was sunk by Luftwaffe aircraft at Murmansk. She was later raised, repaired and returned to service.
U-254	Kriegsmarine	World War II: Whilst manoeuvering to attack Convoy HX 217, the Type VIIC submarine collided with U-221 (Kriegsmarine) in the Atlantic Ocean (55°00′N 40°00′W) and sank with the loss of 41 of her 45 crew. Survivors were rescued by U-221.
U-611	Kriegsmarine	World War II: The Type VIIC submarine was depth charged and sunk in the Atlantic Ocean south east of Cape Farewell, Greenland (57°25′N 35°19′W) by a Consolidated B-24 Liberator aircraft on 120 Squadron, Royal Air Force with the loss of all 45 crew.

== 9 December ==
List of shipwrecks: 9 December 1942
Ship	State	Description
Charles L. D.	United Kingdom	Charles L. D. World War II: Convoy HX 217: The cargo ship was torpedoed and sunk in the Atlantic Ocean south east of Cape Farewell, Greenland (59°02′N 30°45′W) by U-553 (Kriegsmarine) with the loss of 36 of her 48 crew. Survivors were rescued by Perth (United Kingdom).
Edith Bösselmann	Germany	World War II: The cargo ship struck a mine and sank in the Baltic Sea west of Rucava, Latvia (56°05′N 20°05′E).
I-3	Imperial Japanese Navy	World War II: The Junsen I type submarine was torpedoed and sunk in the Pacific Ocean 3 miles (4.8 km) north east of Kamimbo Bay, Guadalcanal (09°12′S 159°42′E) by PT-59 (United States Navy) with the loss of her captain and 89 of her crew. Four survivors swam ashore and joined the defenders of the island.
Lyng	Norway	The cargo ship collided with Greyfriars (United Kingdom) and sank in the North Sea off Tynemouth, Northumberland, United Kingdom. Her seventeen crew were rescued.
HMS Marigold	Royal Navy	World War II: Convoy KMS 3Y: The Flower-class corvette was torpedoed and sunk in the Mediterranean Sea by Savoia-Marchetti SM.79 aircraft of 105° Gruppo AS, Regia Aeronautica with the loss of 40 of her 85 crew.
Mascot	Free France	World War II: The cargo ship was torpedoed and sunk in the Mediterranean Sea, east of Cape Carbon, Algeria, by Regia Aeronautica aircraft.
Nigerian	United Kingdom	World War II: The cargo ship was torpedoed and sunk in the Atlantic Ocean 130 nautical miles (240 km) south east of Trinidad (9°17′N 59°00′W) with the loss of five of her 61 crew. Survivors were rescued by Maravi (Panama), Newbrundoc ( Canada) and USS PC-624 (United States Navy).
HMS Porcupine	Royal Navy	World War II: The P-class destroyer was torpedoed and damaged in the Mediterranean Sea north east of Oran, Algeria (36°40′N 0°04′W) by U-602 (Kriegsmarine) with the loss of seven of her 176 crew. Survivors were rescued by HMS Vanoc (Royal Navy). HMS Porcupine was towed to Arzew by a French tug. In March 1943, she was towed to Oran where she was declared a total loss. She was cut in two and both halves were towed to Portsmouth, Hampshire, United Kingdom where they were used as accommodation hulks until 1946.
Süllberg	Germany	World War II: The cargo ship was torpedoed and sunk in the Gulf of Gabès, Tunisia (34°14′N 10°32′E) by HMS Umbra (Royal Navy).

== 10 December ==
List of shipwrecks: 10 December 1942
Ship	State	Description
Kamoi Maru	Imperial Japanese Navy	World War II: The Shin Yubari Maru-class auxiliary collier was torpedoed and sunk in the Buka-Kilinailau Channel about 32 nautical miles (59 km) north north west off the north end of Bougainville Island, Papua New Guinea (04°56′S 154°58′E) by USS Wahoo (United States Navy). Two of her crew were killed.
HMS LCM 508, HMS LCM 509, HMS LCM 519, HMS LCM 522, HMS LCM 523, HMS LCM 547, and HMS LCM 620	Royal Navy	The Landing Craft, Mechanized were lost on this date.
UJ 1704 Ulhenhorst	Kriegsmarine	The naval trawler was wrecked near the Geitungen Lighthouse, Norway (59°07′N 5°15′E).

== 11 December ==
List of shipwrecks: 11 December 1942
Ship	State	Description
HMS Blean	Royal Navy	World War II: Convoy KMF 4: The Hunt-class destroyer (1,087/1,490 t, 1942) was torpedoed and sunk in the Mediterranean Sea 11 nautical miles (20 km) north west of Oran, Algeria by U-443 (Kriegsmarine) with the loss of 89 of her 168 crew.
Johore Maru	Imperial Japanese Army	World War II: The Nagoya Maru-class auxiliary transport ship (6,187 GRT, 1932) was torpedoed off Cape St. George, New Britain (4°55′S 152°44′E) by USS Seadragon (United States Navy). She was run aground near Rabaul and repairs were completed by August 1943.
Trautenfels	Germany	World War II: The cargo ship (6,418 GRT, 1921) struck a mine and sank in the North Sea off Terschelling, Friesland, Netherlands.

== 12 December ==
List of shipwrecks: 12 December 1942
Ship	State	Description
Avonwood	United Kingdom	World War II: Convoy FN 889: The cargo ship was torpedoed and sunk in the North Sea off Lowestoft, Suffolk by S-48 (Kriegsmarine) with the loss of thirteen lives.
Berto	Norway	World War II: The cargo ship was sunk at Algiers, Algeria (36°48′N 3°04′E) by limpet mines that had been placed on her hull by frogmen from Ambra (Regia Marina). Her 27 crew survived but a passenger was killed.
Empire Centaur	United Kingdom	World War II: The cargo ship was damaged in the Mediterranean Sea off Algiers by manned torpedoes launched from Ambra (Regia Marina) in an operation conducted by Decima Flottiglia MAS, Regia Marina. She was repaired and returned to service.
Empire Gull	United Kingdom	World War II: The Design 1105 ship was torpedoed and sunk in the Mozambique Channel (26°15′S 34°40′E) by U-177 (Kriegsmarine) with the loss of two of her 46 crew. Survivors were rescued by HMS Freesia and HMS Inconstant (both Royal Navy).
Empire Hawk	United Kingdom	World War II: The Design 1022 ship was torpedoed and sunk in the Atlantic Ocean (5°56′N 39°50′W) by Tazzoli (Regia Marina).
Glen Tilt	United Kingdom	World War II: Convoy FN 889: The cargo ship was torpedoed and sunk in the North Sea off Lowestoft by S-110 (Kriegsmarine).
Gyukozan Maru	Japan	World War II: The cargo ship was torpedoed and sunk off the north east coast of Japan by USS Halibut (United States Navy).
Knitsley	United Kingdom	World War II: Convoy FN 889: The cargo ship was torpedoed and sunk in the North Sea off Lowestoft by S-117 (Kriegsmarine).
Lindisfarne	United Kingdom	World War II: Convoy FN 889: The cargo ship was torpedoed and sunk in the North Sea off Lowestoft by S-63 (Kriegsmarine).
Macedonia	Germany	World War II: The cargo ship was torpedoed and damaged in the Mediterranean Sea off Sousse, Tunisia by HMS Umbra (Royal Navy). She was beached, but was torpedoed and destroyed on 4 March 1943 by HMS Unseen (Royal Navy).
Marianne	Norway	World War II: Convoy FN 889: The cargo ship was torpedoed and sunk in the North Sea off Lowestoft by S-63 (Kriegsmarine) with the loss of fourteen of her 30 crew. Survivors were rescued by Royal Navy ships.
Ocean Vanquisher	United Kingdom	The Ocean ship was severely damaged by a limpet mine in the Bay of Algiers. Not permanently repaired until 1946.
Ombilin	Netherlands	World War II: The cargo ship was torpedoed and sunk in the Atlantic Ocean (7°25′N 39°19′W) by Enrico Tazzoli (Regia Marina). Her 81 crew survived, but two were taken as prisoners of war.
Pierre Loti	United Kingdom	The refrigerated cargo liner ran aground in the Gabon Estuary (0°43′N 9°18′E). She was abandoned as a total loss on 4 November 1943.
USS PT-44	United States Navy	World War II: The PT boat was shelled and sunk off Savo Island, Solomon Islands, (09°10′S 159°45′E) by Kawakaze and Suzukaze (both Imperial Japanese Navy).
HMS P222	Royal Navy	World War II: The S-class submarine was depth charged and sunk in the Mediterranean Sea off Capri, Italy by Fortunale (Regia Marina) with the loss of all 48 crew.
Ripley	United Kingdom	World War II: The cargo ship was torpedoed and sunk in the Atlantic Ocean (0°35′S 32°17′W) by U-161 (Kriegsmarine). Her 41 crew were either rescued by Royal Star (United Kingdom) or reached land in their lifeboat.
Sperrbrecher 144 Beijerland	Kriegsmarine	World War II: Operation Valuable: The Sperrbrecher was shelled and sunk in the English Channel 9 nautical miles (17 km) north west of Dieppe, Seine-Inférieure, France by HMS Albrighton and HMS Eskdale (both Royal Navy) with the loss of all 36 of her crew.
Sperrbrecher 178 Gauss	Kriegsmarine	World War II: Operation Valuable: The Sperrbrecher was shelled and sunk in the English Channel 9 nautical miles (17 km) north west of Dieppe by HMS Worcester (Royal Navy). Only three of her 102 crew were rescued.
Tannenfels	Germany	World War II: Operation Frankton: The cargo ship was damaged in port at Bordeaux, France, by limpet mines placed by a team of Royal Marines and was never seaworthy again. She was sunk as a blockship in 1944.
Teruzuki	Imperial Japanese Navy	World War II: The Akizuki-class destroyer was torpedoed and sunk off Guadalcanal, Solomon Islands, by PT-37 and PT-40 (both United States Navy). Nine of her crew killed. Fifty-six survivors rescued by Naganami, 140 survivors were rescued by Arashi (both Imperial Japanese Navy) and 150 others, including her commanding officer, reached Guadalcanal in boats.
Unnamed	(Nazi Germany) Wehrmacht	World War II: The Siebel ferry was sunk by a mine in the Kerch Strait.

== 13 December ==
List of shipwrecks: 13 December 1942
Ship	State	Description
City of Bombay	United Kingdom	World War II: The cargo liner was torpedoed and sunk in the Atlantic Ocean (2°43′N 29°06′W) by U-159 (Kriegsmarine) with the loss of 24 of the 154 people on board. Survivors were rescued by Cape Breton (United Kingdom), Star of Cairo (Egypt) and USS Tenacity (United States Navy).
Corallo	Regia Marina	World War II: The Perla-class submarine was sunk in the Mediterranean Sea off Bougie, Algeria by HMS Enchantress (Royal Navy) with the loss of all 49 hands.
F 281	Kriegsmarine	The Type A Marinefährprahm was wrecked after running aground south of Kristiansand, Norway in a storm.
Foscolo	Italy	World War II: The cargo ship was torpedoed and sunk in the Mediterranean Sea (37°33′N 12°02′E) by Fairey Albacore aircraft of 828 Squadron, Fleet Air Arm. There were 27 dead and 81 survivors.
Ha-22	Imperial Japanese Navy	World War II: The midget submarine was scuttled off Lunga Point Guadalcanal, Solomon Islands after both torpedoes fired by Ha-22 missed a United States Navy destroyer. Her two crew made it to shore at Cape Esperance.
HMS LCP(R) 578	Royal Navy	The Landing Craft Personnel (Ramped) was lost on this date.
HMS LCV 579	Royal Navy	The Landing Craft, Vehicle was lost on this date.
Scania	Sweden	World War II: The cargo ship was captured and scuttled in the Atlantic Ocean 60 nautical miles (110 km) north of Fortaleza, Brazil (1°36′N 32°22′W) by U-176 (Kriegsmarine). Her 25 crew were rescued by Nordstjernan (Sweden).
Theano	Germany	World War II: The cargo ship was torpedoed and sunk in the North Sea off Mandal, Norway by British aircraft.

== 14 December ==
List of shipwrecks: 14 December 1942
Ship	State	Description
HMS Argonaut	Royal Navy	World War II: The Dido-class cruiser was torpedoed and severely damaged in the Mediterranean Sea by Mocenigo (Regia Marina). Repairs took until November 1943 to complete.
Canberra Maru	Japan	World War II: The cargo ship was sunk near Guadalcanal, Solomon Islands by American aircraft.
Castelverde	Italy	World War II: The tanker was torpedoed and sunk in the Mediterranean Sea off Cap Bon, Tunisia (37°29′N 10°46′E) by HMS Unruffled (Royal Navy). Fifteen men were killed or missing, 248 survivors were rescued.
Caucaso	Italy	World War II: The cargo ship was torpedoed and sunk in the Mediterranean Sea by British aircraft.
Delfin	Italy	World War II: The Standard World War I cargo ship was torpedoed and sunk off the islet of Macronisi (37°52′N 24°06′E) by HMS Taku (Royal Navy). There were no casualties.
Edencrag	United Kingdom	World War II: Convoy TE 9: The cargo ship was torpedoed and sunk in the Mediterranean Sea west of Algiers, Algeria (35°49′N 1°25′W) by U-443 (Kriegsmarine) with the loss of thirteen of her 24 crew. Survivors were rescued by HMS Samphire (Royal Navy).
Etna	Sweden	World War II: The cargo ship was torpedoed and sunk in the Atlantic Ocean (17°43′N 46°15′W) by U-217 (Kriegsmarine). Her 27 crew survived.
Honestas	Italy	World War II: The cargo ship was torpedoed and sunk in the Mediterranean Sea off Cape Bon (37°28′N 10°36′E) by HMS Sahib (Royal Navy). Eight of the 162 men aboard (65 crew and 97 soldiers bound for Tunisia) were killed.
Orfor	United Kingdom	World War II: The cargo ship was torpedoed and sunk in the Atlantic Ocean (approximately 16°N 50°W) by U-105 (Kriegsmarine) with the loss of 22 of her 61 crew. Survivors were rescued by HMT Black Bear (Royal Navy) or reached land in their lifeboat.
Sawahloento	Netherlands	World War II: The cargo ship was torpedoed and sunk in the Indian Ocean 170 nautical miles (310 km) south east of Durban, Union of South Africa (31°02′S 34°00′E) by U-177 (Kriegsmarine) with the loss of 52 of her 73 crew. Survivors were rescued by the fishing vessel Guide Me ( Union of South Africa).
Trondhjem	Norway	The cargo ship collided with Oinas (Finland) and sank. She was raised in April 1943, repaired and returned to service.

== 15 December ==
List of shipwrecks: 15 December 1942
Ship	State	Description
Alcoa Rambler	United States	World War II: The cargo ship was torpedoed and sunk in the South Atlantic 200 nautical miles (370 km) north west of Natal, Brazil (3°51′S 33°08′W) by U-174 (Kriegsmarine) with the loss of one of her 55 crew.
Germania	Germany	World War II: The cargo ship was intercepted in the Atlantic Ocean west of Cape Finisterre, Spain (45°05′N 15°30′W) by HMS Egret and HMS Tanatside (both Royal Navy) and was scuttled. Seventy-one survivors were rescued.
Hannah Møller	United Kingdom	World War II: The cargo ship was bombed and sunk at Benghazi, Libya by Luftwaffe aircraft. Her 55 crew survived.
Sant' Antioco	Italy	World War II: The cargo ship was torpedoed and sunk in the Mediterranean Sea about 35 nautical miles (65 km) north north west of Cape Bon, Tunisia (37°37′N 10°44′E) by HMS Unruffled (Royal Navy). Twenty-nine men were killed or reported missing, over 200 survivors were rescued.
Star of Suez	Egypt	World War II: The cargo ship was torpedoed and sunk in the Atlantic Ocean (00°42′S 29°34′W) by U-159 (Kriegsmarine) with the loss of two of her 42 crew.
U-626	Kriegsmarine	World War II: The Type VIIC submarine was depth charged and sunk in the Atlantic Ocean (56°46′N 27°12′W) by USCGC Ingham (United States Navy) with the loss of all 47 crew.
Uarsciek	Regia Marina	World War II: The Adua-class submarine was depth charged and damaged in the Mediterranean Sea by HMS Petard (Royal Navy) and Vasilissa Olga (Hellenic Navy) and was captured after a surface fight, with the loss of her captain and seventeen of her crew. She sank at (35°08′N 14°22′E) south of Sicily whilst under tow by HMS Petard.

== 16 December ==
List of shipwrecks: 16 December 1942
Ship	State	Description
Bello	Norway	World War II: Convoy ON 153: The tanker was torpedoed and sunk in the Atlantic Ocean (51°45′N 23°50′W) by U-610 (Kriegsmarine) with the loss of 33 of her 40 crew. Survivors were rescued by HMS Pink (Royal Navy).
East Wales	United Kingdom	World War II: The cargo ship was torpedoed and sunk in the Atlantic Ocean (0°24′N 31°27′W) by U-159 (Kriegsmarine) with the loss of seventeen of her 45 crew. Survivors were rescued by Gullmaren (Sweden).
Emile Francqui	Belgium	World War II: Convoy ON 153: The cargo ship was torpedoed and sunk in the Atlantic Ocean (50°58′N 24°42′W) by U-664 (Kriegsmarine) with the loss of 46 of the 87 people on board.
Genzan Maru	Japan	World War II: South Bound Convoy No. 65: The cargo ship was torpedoed and damaged by USS Halibut (United States Navy) off "Shriya Zaki". The ship was lost by grounding.
Observer	United Kingdom	World War II: The cargo ship was torpedoed and sunk in the South Atlantic 350 nautical miles (650 km) east of Cape São Roque, Brazil (5°30′S 31°00′W) by U-176 (Kriegsmarine) with the loss of 66 of her 81 crew.
USS S-49	United States Navy	The S-class submarine, out of commission since 1927, sank in 102 feet (31 m) of water in the Patuxent River at 38°19′53.2″N 076°29′17.2″W on a bearing of 318.5 degrees true, distant 525 yards (480 m), from the southern tip of Point Patience, Maryland.
Shingo Maru	Japan	World War II: North Bound Convoy No. 67: The cargo ship was torpedoed and sunk by USS Halibut (United States Navy) off "Shriya Zaki".

== 17 December ==
List of shipwrecks: 17 December 1942
Ship	State	Description
Aviere	Regia Marina	World War II: The Soldati-class destroyer was torpedoed and sunk in the Mediterranean Sea north-east of Bizerte, Tunisia (38°00′N 10°05′E), by HMS Splendid (Royal Navy), with the loss of 220 lives. There were 30 survivors.
Bandoeng Maru	Imperial Japanese Army	World War II: The Eastern Guide-class auxiliary troopship was torpedoed and sunk in the Solomon Sea 15 nautical miles (28 km) north west of Cape Henpan, Buka Island, Papua New Guinea (4°54′S 154°17′E) by USS Grouper (United States Navy). Thirteen of her crew were killed.
Coot	United States	The cargo ship foundered in the Gulf of Mexico west north west of Key West, Florida at (24°37′N 82°35′W).
HMS Firedrake	Royal Navy	World War II: Convoy ON 153: The F-class destroyer was torpedoed and sunk in the Atlantic Ocean (50°50′N 25°15′W by U-211 (Kriegsmarine) with the loss of 118 of her 145 crew. Survivors were rescued by HMS Sunflower (Royal Navy).
USCGC Natsek	United States Coast Guard	The cutter disappeared in the Strait of Belle Isle for an unknown reason with the loss of all 24 hands.
Phyllis S.	United States	The motor vessel sank after she nearly was cut in half in a collision with USS Hulbert (United States Navy) in the Kupreanof Strait (57°47′20″N 152°24′10″W) near Kodiak, Territory of Alaska. Two people aboard Phyllis S. died.
Poitou	France	World War II: The naval trawler was torpedoed and sunk in the Mediterranean Sea off Morocco (33°23′N 8°30′W) by U-432 (Kriegsmarine) with the loss of twenty of her 22 crew.

== 18 December ==
List of shipwrecks: 18 December 1942
Ship	State	Description
Bretwalda	United Kingdom	World War II: Convoy MKS 3Y: The cargo ship straggled behind the convoy. She was torpedoed and sunk in the Atlantic Ocean 330 nautical miles (610 km) west north west of Cape Finisterre, Spain (44°35′N 16°28′W) by U-563 (Kriegsmarine) with the loss of one of her 56 crew. Survivors were rescued by ORP Krakowiak (Polish Navy).
City of Hankow	United Kingdom	The cargo ship was driven ashore at the North Point, 4 nautical miles (7.4 km) north of Saldanha Bay.
Eufrasia C.	Italy	World War II: The sailing vessel was torpedoed and sunk in the Mediterranean Sea by HMS Safari (Royal Navy).
Julia	Germany	World War II: The cargo ship was sunk at Tripoli, Libya.
HMS MTB 30	Royal Navy	World War II: The motor torpedo boat struck a mine and sank in the North Sea. Four of her crew were killed, and another died before he could be transferred to hospital.
Monsun	Germany	The cargo ship foundered off Rørvik, Norway.
Oropos	Greece	World War II: Convoy ON 152: The cargo ship straggled behind the convoy. She was torpedoed and sunk in the Atlantic Ocean (approximately 51°N 37°W) by U-621 (Kriegsmarine) with the loss of all 34 crew.
HMS Partridge	Royal Navy	World War II: The P-class destroyer was torpedoed and sunk in the Mediterranean Sea, west of Oran, Algeria (35°50′N 1°35′W) by U-565 (Kriegsmarine) with the loss of 38 of her 211 crew. Survivors were rescued by HMS Penn (Royal Navy).
Tenryū	Imperial Japanese Navy	World War II: The Tenryū-class cruiser was torpedoed and sunk in the Bismarck Sea off Madang, New Guinea (05°12′S 145°56′E) by USS Albacore (United States Navy). 23 crew killed. Survivors were rescued by Suzukaze (Imperial Japanese Navy).

== 19 December ==
List of shipwrecks: 19 December 1942
Ship	State	Description
BW 04 Delfin 4	Kriegsmarine	The Delfin 1-class patrol boat was sunk on this date.
D	Germany	World War II: The tug was shelled and sunk at Feodosia, Soviet Union by Nezamozhnik (Soviet Navy).
F 538	Kriegsmarine	World War II: The Type CM minelayer Marinefährprahm was sunk by a mine off "Eltingen", Crimea, Soviet Union (05°02′S 152°33′E). Eleven of her crew were killed or reported missing, One of the two survivors was seriously wounded.
HMS Snapdragon	Royal Navy	World War II: The Flower-class corvette was bombed and sunk in the Mediterranean Sea by Luftwaffe aircraft with the loss of 23 of her crew.
HMNZS South Sea	Royal New Zealand Navy	The minesweeping trawler was sunk in a collision with Wahine (New Zealand) in Wellington Harbour.

== 20 December ==
List of shipwrecks: 20 December 1942
Ship	State	Description
I-4	Imperial Japanese Navy	World War II: The Junsen I type submarine was torpedoed and sunk in the Pacific Ocean in St. George's Channel, between New Britain and New Ireland (05°02′S 152°33′E), by USS Seadragon (United States Navy). Lost with all 90 crew.
Mitsuki Maru	Imperial Japanese Army	World War II: The transport ship struck a mine and sank in the Pacific Ocean off the Inubōsaki Lighthouse.
Otina	United Kingdom	World War II: Convoy ON 153: The tanker was torpedoed and sunk in the Atlantic Ocean west of Ireland (47°40′N 33°06′W) by U-621 (Kriegsmarine) with the loss of all 60 crew.
Walküre	Germany	The cargo ship was driven ashore at Hjelmbodan, Norway. She was a total loss.

== 21 December ==
List of shipwrecks: 21 December 1942
Ship	State	Description
Montreal City	United Kingdom	World War II: Convoy ON 152: The cargo ship straggled behind the convoy. She was torpedoed and sunk in the Atlantic Ocean 600 nautical miles (1,100 km) east north east of St. John's, Dominion of Newfoundland (50°23′N 38°00′W) by U-591 (Kriegsmarine) with the loss of all 40 crew.
Queen City	United Kingdom	World War II: The cargo ship was torpedoed, shelled and sunk in the Atlantic Ocean (0°49′S 41°34′W) by Enrico Tazzoli (Regia Marina) with the loss of six of her crew.
RJ	Kriegsmarine	World War II: The patrol craft was bombed and sunk in the Black Sea by Ilyushin Il-4 aircraft of the Soviet Naval Air Force.
Rosina S.	Regia Marina	World War II: The minesweeper was torpedoed and sunk in the Mediterranean Sea by HMS Safari (Royal Navy). There were eight dead and 19 survivors.
Strathallan	United Kingdom	World War II: Convoy KMF 5: The troopship was torpedoed and damaged in the Mediterranean Sea 40 nautical miles (74 km) north of Oran, Algeria by U-562 (Kriegsmarine) with the loss of eleven of the 5,122 people on board. She was taken in tow by HMS Laforey (Royal Navy), which later transferred the tow to HMS Restive (Royal Navy). The survivors were rescued by HMS Laforey, HMS Panther, HMS Pathfinder, HMS Restive and HMS Verity (all Royal Navy). Strathallen capsized and sank the next day at 36°01′N 0°33′W.
Zuri	Regia Marina	World War II: The minesweeper struck a mine and sank in the Mediterranean Sea off Bizerte, Tunisia. Sixteen of her crew were killed.

== 22 December ==
List of shipwrecks: 22 December 1942
Ship	State	Description
Etruria	Italy	World War II: The cargo ship was torpedoed and sunk in the Mediterranean Sea north north west of Marettimo (38°06′N 11°33′E) by Fairey Albacore aircraft of 828 Squadron, Fleet Air Arm. There were eighteen dead and 112 survivors.
Kaiyo Maru	Japan	The cargo ship was wrecked in the Seto Inland Sea.
P 35	Imperial Japanese Navy	World War II: The guard ship was torpedoed and sunk in the Pacific Ocean by USS Greenling (United States Navy).

== 23 December ==
List of shipwrecks: 23 December 1942
Ship	State	Description
Knut	United Kingdom	World War II: The cargo ship struck a mine and sank in the Irish Sea 10 nautical miles (19 km) south east of Bardsey Island, Pembrokeshire. Her 23 crew survived.
Sperrbrecher 138 Friedrich Karl	Kriegsmarine	World War II: The Sperrbrecher struck a mine and sank in the North Sea off Borkum.

== 24 December ==
List of shipwrecks: 24 December 1942
Ship	State	Description
Amakasu Maru No. 1	Imperial Japanese Navy	World War II: The Peacetime Standard Type D water tanker was torpedoed and sunk in the Pacific Ocean about 2 nautical miles (3.7 km) south south west of Wake Island, Marshall Islands (19°16′N 166°37′E) by USS Triton (United States Navy). Twelve of her crew were killed.
Empire Path	United Kingdom	World War II: The cargo ship struck a mine and was beached near Dunkerque, Nord, France. Abandoned by her crew, she broke her back and sank.
Tama Maru No. 2	Imperial Japanese Navy	World War II: Invasion of Lae-Salamaua: The minesweeper sank off New Guinea due to damage inflicted on her on 10 March by Douglas SBD Dauntless dive bombers based on the aircraft carriers USS Lexington and USS Yorktown (both United States Navy).

== 25 December ==
List of shipwrecks: 25 December 1942
Ship	State	Description
Banshu Maru No. 2	Imperial Japanese Navy	World War II: The Banshu Maru-class auxiliary storeship was torpedoed 15 nautical miles (28 km) north of Dili, Portuguese Timor by USS Tautog (United States Navy) and sunk about 16 nmi (30 km) north west of Atapapu (08°40′S 124°30′E) with the loss of a crew member.
Ben Screel	United Kingdom	The trawler sailed from Methil on 18 December 1942 and was last seen on Christmas Day.
Dona Aurora	Philippines	World War II: The cargo ship was torpedoed and sunk in the South Atlantic 200 miles (320 km) east of Brazil (02°02′S 35°17′W) by Enrico Tazzoli (Regia Marina). Seven of her crew were killed. Two were captured and made prisoners of war. Fifty survivors were rescued by Testbank (United Kingdom).
F 543	Kriegsmarine	World War II: The Type C Marinefährprahm was strafed by Allied fighters and her cargo set on fire off Sousse, Tunisia. She was beached but became a total loss. The whole crew survived.
HMS LCP(L) 36	Royal Navy	The Landing Craft Personnel (Large) was lost on this date.
HMS P48	Royal Navy	World War II: The U-class submarine was depth charged and sunk in the Gulf of Tunis north west of Zembra, Tunisia (37°15′N 10°30′E) by Ardente and Ardito (both Regia Marina) with the loss of all hands.
Tokiwa Maru No. 1	Japan	World War II: The cargo ship was torpedoed and sunk in the Pacific Ocean off the Bismark Archipelago by USS Thresher (United States Navy).
Y 38	Imperial Japanese Navy	World War II: The minesweeper was torpedoed and sunk in the Pacific Ocean by USS Grayback (United States Navy).

== 26 December ==
List of shipwrecks: 26 December 1942
Ship	State	Description
Port Orford	United States	The schooner sank during a snowstorm in Chatham Strait off Point Gardner (56°58′00″N 134°33′30″W) Territory of Alaska. Her 28 crew abandoned ship in lifeboats and rowed to Tyee, Territory of Alaska.
O97 Margherita	Regia Marina	World War II: The auxiliary submarine chaser (69 GRT) was sunk by gunfire in the Mediterranean Sea off Mahdia, Tunisia by HMS Unrivalled (Royal Navy). There were five dead and three survivors.
RD 30	Regia Marina	World War II: The RD-class minesweeper was sunk at Bizerte, Tunisia by Allied aircraft. There were no casualties.
U-357	Kriegsmarine	World War II: The Type VIIC submarine was depth charged, rammed, and sunk in the Atlantic Ocean northwest of Ireland (57°10′N 15°40′W) by the destroyers HMS Hesperus and HMS Vanessa (both Royal Navy) with the loss of 36 of her 42 crew.

== 27 December ==
List of shipwrecks: 27 December 1942
Ship	State	Description
Eleonora Rosa	Italy	World War II: The sailing vessel was torpedoed and sunk in the Mediterranean Sea by HMS Safari (Royal Navy). There were two missing and three survivors.
Empire Union	United Kingdom	World War II: Convoy ONS 154: The cargo ship was torpedoed and sunk in the Atlantic Ocean (47°30′N 24°30′W) by U-356 (Kriegsmarine) with the loss of six of her 69 crew. Survivors were rescued by Toward (United Kingdom).
Italy Maru	Imperial Japanese Army	World War II: The Daifuku Maru No. 1-class auxiliary transport ship was bombed and sunk at Rabaul, New Britain (04°21′S 142°17′E) by Boeing B-17 Flying Fortress aircraft of the United States Army Air Force.
King Edward	United Kingdom	World War II: Convoy ONS 154: The cargo ship was torpedoed and sunk in the Atlantic Ocean north north east of the Azores, Portugal (47°25′N 25°20′W) by U-356 (Kriegsmarine) with the loss of 23 of her 48 crew. Survivors were rescued by HMCS Napanee (Royal Canadian Navy) and Toward (United Kingdom).
Melrose Abbey	United Kingdom	World War II: Convoy ONS 154: The cargo ship was torpedoed and sunk in the Atlantic Ocean north north east of the Azores (47°30′N 24°30′W) by U-356 (Kriegsmarine) with the loss of seven of her 34 crew. Survivors were rescued by Toward (United Kingdom).
Oakbank	United Kingdom	World War II: The cargo ship was torpedoed and sunk in the Atlantic Ocean 200 nautical miles (370 km) north east of Fortaleza, Brazil (0°46′S 37°58′W) by U-507 (Kriegsmarine) with the loss of 27 of her 64 crew. Two of her crew, including her captain, were taken on board U-507 as prisoners of war and died when U-507 was sunk on 13 January 1943. The rest of the survivors were rescued by Comandante Ripper ( Brazil) and Juvenal (Argentina).
Saone	Germany	World War II: The cargo ship ran aground while evading Soviet warships in the Black Sea. She was later refloated and returned to service.
Scottish Heather	United Kingdom	World War II: Convoy ONS 154: The tanker straggled behind the convoy due to refuelling HMCS Chilliwack (Royal Canadian Navy) at sea. She was torpedoed and damaged in the Atlantic Ocean (46°15′N 26°20′W) by U-225 (Kriegsmarine). Scottish Heather was abandoned by her 54 crew, but was later reboarded and reached the Clyde on 2 January 1943. She was subsequently repaired and returned to service.
Soekaboemi	Netherlands	World War II: Convoy ONS 154: The cargo liner straggled behind the convoy. She was torpedoed and damaged in the Atlantic Ocean (47°25′N 25°20′W) by U-336 (Kriegsmarine) with the loss of one of the 70 people on board. Survivors were rescued by HMCS Napanee (Royal Canadian Navy) and Toward (United Kingdom). Soekaboemi was later torpedoed and sunk by U-441 (Kriegsmarine).
Tsurugisan Maru	Japan	World War II: The cargo ship was sunk in an air attack at Rabaul, New Guinea.
U-336	Kriegsmarine	World War II: The Type VIIC submarine was depth charged and sunk in the Atlantic Ocean (43°30′N 25°40′W) by HMCS Battleford, HMCS Chilliwack, HMCS Napanee and HMCS St. Laurent (all Royal Canadian Navy) with the loss of all 46 crew.
USS Wasmuth	United States Navy	The high-speed minesweeper, a former Clemson-class destroyer, was sunk in the Pacific Ocean off Alaska when a storm dislodged two of her depth charges, which exploded and damaged the stern of the ship. All on board were rescued by USS Ramapo (United States Navy) before she sank two days later.

== 28 December ==
List of shipwrecks: 28 December 1942
Ship	State	Description
Baron Cochrane	United Kingdom	World War II: Convoy ONS 154: The cargo ship was torpedoed and damaged in the Atlantic Ocean north west of the Azores, Portugal by U-406 (Kriegsmarine). She was then torpedoed and sunk in the early hours of 29 December (43°23′N 27°14′W) by U-123 (Kriegsmarine) with the loss of two of her 44 crew. Survivors were rescued by HMS Milne (Royal Navy).
Choyo Maru	Japan	World War II: The cargo ship was torpedoed and sunk in the South China Sea by USS Kingfish (United States Navy).
Empire Shackleton	United Kingdom	World War II: Convoy ONS 154: The CAM ship straggled behind the convoy. She was torpedoed and damaged in the Atlantic Ocean (43°23′N 27°14′W) by U-225 (Kriegsmarine). She was later torpedoed and damaged by U-123 and then shelled and sunk by U-435 (both Kriegsmarine). Her crew were rescued; 43 by HMS Fidelity (Royal Navy) and 26 by HMCS Shediac (Royal Canadian Navy).
Empire Wagtail	United Kingdom	World War II: Convoy ONS 154: The cargo ship was torpedoed and sunk in the Atlantic Ocean (43°17′N 27°22′W) by U-260 (Kriegsmarine) with the loss of all 42 crew.
Lynton Grange	United Kingdom	World War II: Convoy ONS 154: The cargo ship straggled behind the convoy. She was torpedoed and damaged in the Atlantic Ocean north west of the Azores by U-406 (Kriegsmarine). She was then torpedoed and sunk in the early hours of 29 December (43°23′N 27°14′W) by U-628 (Kriegsmarine). Her 52 crew were rescued by HMS Milne (Royal Navy).
Melmore Head	United Kingdom	World War II: Convoy ONS 154: The cargo ship was torpedoed and sunk in the Atlantic Ocean (43°27′N 27°15′W) by U-225 (Kriegsmarine) with the loss of fourteen of her 49 crew. Survivors were rescued by HMCS Shediac (Royal Canadian Navy).
Norse King	Norway	World War II: Convoy ON 154: The cargo ship was torpedoed and damaged in the Atlantic Ocean by U-591 (Kriegsmarine) and was abandoned by her 37 crew, who were rescued by one of the escort vessels. They later reboarded her and go her under way again. The next day, she was torpedoed, shelled and sunk (43°27′N 27°15′W) by U-435 (Kriegsmarine) with the loss of all hands.
Odysseus	Kriegsmarine	World War II: The cargo ship was torpedoed and sunk in the Mediterranean Sea 12 nautical miles (22 km) north of Marettimo, Italy (38°09′N 11°54′E) by HMS Ursula (Royal Navy) with the loss of eighteen of her 40 crew.
Ōmi Maru	Japan	World War II: The cargo liner was torpedoed and sunk in the Pacific Ocean midway between Wake Island and Truk, South Pacific Mandate (6°24′N 160°18′E) by USS Triton (United States Navy) with the loss of all hands.
HMS P311	Royal Navy	World War II: Operation Principal: The T-class submarine departed from Malta for La Maddalena, Sicily, Italy. No further trace, lost with all 71 people on board.
President Francqui	Belgium	World War II: Convoy ONS 154: The tanker was torpedoed and damaged in the Atlantic Ocean north of the Azores, Portugal (43°23′N 27°14′W) by U-225 (Kriegsmarine). She then straggled behind the convoy and was torpedoed and sunk the next day by U-336 (Kriegsmarine) with the loss of five of her 52 crew. Her captain was taken on board U-225 as a prisoner of war. The survivors were rescued by HMCS Prescott and HMCS Shediac (both Royal Canadian Navy).
Sperrbrecher 149 Goote	Kriegsmarine	World War II: The Sperrbrecher struck a mine and sank in the North Sea off Den Helder, North Holland, Netherlands.
HMS St. Issey	Royal Navy	World War II: The Saint-class tug was torpedoed and sunk in the Mediterranean Sea off Benghazi, Libya (32°37′N 20°22′E) by U-617 (Kriegsmarine) with the loss of all 36 crew.
Treworlas	United Kingdom	World War II: The cargo ship was torpedoed and sunk in the Atlantic Ocean (10°52′N 60°45′W) by U-124 (Kriegsmarine) with the loss of 38 of her 47 crew. Survivors were rescued by USS PC-609 (United States Navy).
Ville de Rouen	United Kingdom	World War II: Convoy ONS 154: The cargo ship was torpedoed and damaged in the Atlantic Ocean north of the Azores by U-225 (Kriegsmarine). She was later torpedoed and sunk by U-662 (Kriegsmarine). Her 71 crew were rescued by HMCS Shediac (Royal Canadian Navy).
Zarian	United Kingdom	World War II: Convoy ONS 154: The cargo ship straggled behind the convoy. She was torpedoed and damaged north west of the Azores by U-406 (Kriegsmarine). She was then torpedoed and sunk in the early hours of 29 December at 43°23′N 27°14′W by U-591 (Kriegsmarine) with the loss of four of her 49 crew. Survivors were rescued by HMS Milne (Royal Navy).

== 29 December ==
List of shipwrecks: 29 December 1942
Ship	State	Description
Argonaut	Germany	The cargo ship was sunk in a collision with Ceuta (Germany) off Kirkenes, Norway. There were 11 dead and 36 survivors.
E. H. Blum	United States	The tanker ran aground 8 nautical miles (15 km) west of the Fenwick Island Shoal Whistle Buoy (38°24′N 74°55′W). On 30 December pounding on the bottom caused the hull to crack and an explosion broke her in two. Her stern sank and the bow washed ashore. She was declared a total loss.
Hachian Maru	Japan	World War II: The cargo ship was shelled and damaged in the Java Sea off Surabaya, Netherlands East Indies by USS Thresher (United States Navy). She sank the next day.
Iseo	Italy	World War II: The cargo ship was torpedoed and sunk in the Mediterranean Sea off Cape Bon, Algeria by British aircraft. There were 59 dead and thirteem survivors.
Marte	Italy	World War II: The cargo ship was torpedoed and sunk in the Mediterranean Sea off Cape Ferrato (39°17′N 9°41′E) by HMS Turbulent (Royal Navy) with the loss of two lives.
V 5905 Nordriff	Kriegsmarine	The Polarkreis-class Vorpostenboot ran aground in Lopphavet (70°21′N 21°50′E) and was wrecked with the loss of three lives.
Teifuku Maru	Japan	World War II: The Government chartered cargo ship was damaged by a mine 7 km (3.8 nmi) from the Inubōsaki Lighthouse. She was beached 800 metres (870 yd) north of the Choshi Harbor flood marker. She was abandoned after receiving further damage in a storm on 4 January 1943.
Torquato Gennari	Italy	World War II: The cargo ship was torpedoed and sunk in the Mediterranean Sea by HMS Safari (Royal Navy). There were eight dead and 24 survivors.
Varafjell	Norway	The coaster ran aground at Korsnes and sank.

== 30 December ==
List of shipwrecks: 30 December 1942
Ship	State	Description
HMS Fidelity	Royal Navy	World War II: Convoy ONS 154: The Special Service Vessel straggled behind the convoy due to an engine breakdown. She was torpedoed and sunk in the Atlantic Ocean (43°23′N 27°07′W) by U-435 (Kriegsmarine) with the loss of 274 crewmen, 51 Royal Marines and 43 survivors of Empire Shackleton (United Kingdom). Ten survivors were rescued; eight crew of HMS MTB 105 (Royal Navy), detached on anti-submarine patrol and picked up by HMCS Woodstock (Royal Canadian Navy), and two aircrew of a Vought OS2U Kingfisher that had crashed on 28 December, rescued by HMCS St. Laurent (Royal Canadian Navy). Two landing craft carried by Fidelity, HMS LCV-752 and HMS LCV-754 (both Royal Navy), were also lost, and credited as tonnage destroyed by the U-boat Arm.
Hiteru Maru	Imperial Japanese Army	World War II: The Daifuku Maru No. 1-class transport ship was torpedoed and sunk in the Pacific Ocean (00°41′N 148°52′E) by USS Greenling (United States Navy).Fifteen of her crew were killed.
Ingerfem	Norway	World War II: Convoy ON 156: The cargo ship straggled behind the convoy due to problems with her engine. She was torpedoed and sunk in the Atlantic Ocean (approximately 59°N 21°W) by U-631 (Kriegsmarine) with the loss of 40 of her 41 crew. The survivor was rescued by Stag Hound (United States).
Lancaster	United States	The cargo ship was driven ashore at Casablanca, Morocco. She broke up and was a total loss.
Okaura Maru	Imperial Japanese Army	World War II: The transport ship was sunk in an air attack, capsizing at Rabaul, Papua New Guiner.
Paderewski	Poland	World War II: The cargo ship was torpedoed, shelled and sunk in the Atlantic Ocean 40 nautical miles (74 km) off Trinidad (10°51′N 60°25′W) by U-214 (Kriegsmarine) with the loss of three of her 41 crew. Survivors were rescued by a fishing vessel and two United States Navy patrol boats.
Tomiura Maru	Imperial Japanese Army	World War II: The Akita Maru-class auxiliary transport was bombed and sunk in Simpson Harbor, Rabaul (04°15′S 152°50′E) by Boeing B-17 Flying Fortress aircraft of the United States 5th Air Force. She was scrapped in 1958.

== 31 December ==
List of shipwrecks: 31 December 1942
Ship	State	Description
HMS Achates	Royal Navy	World War II: Battle of the Barents Sea / Convoy JW 51B: The A-class destroyer was shelled and sunk in the Barents Sea 135 nautical miles (250 km) east south east of Bear Island, Norway by Admiral Hipper (Kriegsmarine) with the loss of 113 of her 194 crew.
HMS Bramble	Royal Navy	World War II: Battle of the Barents Sea / Convoy JW 51B: The Halcyon-class minesweeper was shelled and sunk in the Barents Sea by Friedrich Eckoldt, Richard Beitzen and Z29 (all Kriegsmarine) with the loss of 120 of her crew.
Friedrich Eckoldt	Kriegsmarine	Painting of the sinking of Friedrich Eckoldt World War II: Battle of the Barents Sea / Operation Regenbogen: The Type 1934A-class destroyer was shelled and sunk in the Barents Sea (77°19′N 30°47′E) by HMS Sheffield (Royal Navy) with the loss of all 341 crew
Ma-2	Imperial Japanese Navy	World War II: The Ma-1-class auxiliary minelayer was sunk by a mine in Soerabaja Harbour.
V12 Maddalena	Regia Marina	World War II: The auxialiary guard ship (345 GRT) was torpedoed and sunk in the Mediterranean Sea off Mahdia, Tunisia by HMS Unrivalled (Royal Navy). There were eight dead and three survivors.
Maiden Creek	United States	The cargo ship sank in the North Atlantic Ocean 47 nautical miles (87 km) south of Long Island, New York, United States (40.16677°N 072.03284°W) with the loss of twenty lives. She was on a voyage from Botwood, Dominion of Newfoundland, to New York City.
USS Rescuer	United States Navy	World War II: The Rescuer-class rescue and salvage ship was driven aground and wrecked during a gale at Scotch Cap (54°24′15″N 164°47′30″W) on the southwest corner of Unimak Island, Territory of Alaska while attempting to salvage the stranded Turksib (Soviet Union). A crew member fell overboard and was drowned.
Urajio Maru	Imperial Japanese Army	World War II: The merchant cargo ship (3,072 GRT) was bombed and damaged off Kiska by B-24 aircraft of the United States Fifth Air Force. 4 crew were killed. While under repairs a violent wind and rain storm caused further damage on 4 January 1943 and she was abandoned. Her wreck was sunk by USAAF aircraft on 2 April 1943.

== Unknown date ==
List of shipwrecks: Unknown date 1942
Ship	State	Description
Altona	(France) Vichy French Navy	The auxiliary minesweeper was lost.
Arlesiana	Italy	World War II: The cargo ship was bombed and severely damaged by British aircraft at Tunis, Tunisia between 5 and 22 December, and again on 1 January 1943. She was refloated on 31 October 1946 and consequently scrapped in 1949.
Courlis	(France) Vichy French Navy	The auxiliary minesweeper was lost.
Eurika	Canada	The tug went missing off the coast of New Brunswick on or after 17 December.
Gabes	(France) Vichy French Navy	The minesweeping tug was lost.
Green Toad	United States	The fishing vessel sank at Ketchikan, Territory of Alaska.
Grondin	(France) Vichy French Navy	The auxiliary minesweeper was lost.
HA-28	Imperial Japanese Navy	The midget submarine became swamped through her conning tower hatch and sank in a heavy storm at Kiska, Territory of Alaska.
Heron I	(France) Vichy French Navy	The auxiliary minesweeper was lost.
Homard	(France) Vichy French Navy	The minesweeping tug) was lost.
L-24	Soviet Navy	World War II: The Leninets-class submarine was sunk in a minefield in the Black Sea east of Cape Shabla (43°19′N 28°41′E), Bulgaria, sometime between 15 and 19 December with the loss of all 60 crew members.
HMS LCT 2053	Royal Navy	World War II: The Landing Craft, Tank was lost in transit from the United States to the United Kingdom, probably as cargo on a ship.
HMS LCT 2054	Royal Navy	World War II: The Landing Craft, Tank was lost in transit from the United States to the United Kingdom, probably as cargo on a ship.
HMS LCT 2312	Royal Navy	World War II: The Landing Craft, Tank was lost in transit from the United States to the United Kingdom, probably as cargo on a ship
M-31	Soviet Navy	World War II: The M-class submarine went missing in the Black Sea off Fidonisi Island sometime after 17 December.
Madone de Pompei	(France) Vichy French Navy	The auxiliary minesweeper was lost.
HMS Mondara	Royal Navy	World War II: The cable layer was bombed and damaged at Yarmouth, Isle of Wight by Luftwaffe aircraft. She was beached and used as a stores ship until scrapped in 1947.
Pen Men	(France) Vichy French Navy	The auxiliary minesweeper was lost.
Petite Yvette	(France) Vichy French Navy	The auxiliary minesweeper was lost.
Ravignan	(France) Vichy French Navy	The auxiliary minesweeper was lost.
Robaste	(France) Vichy French Navy	Theminesweeping tug was lost.
Shch-212	Soviet Navy	World War II: The Shchuka-class submarinewas sunk in a minefield in the Black Sea off the coast of Romania (45°11′N 30°09′E) sometime after 11 December with the loss of all 44 crew members.
Sousse	(France) Vichy French Navy	The minesweeping tug was lost.
