= December 1942 =

Month of 1942

<<	December 1942					>>
Su	Mo	Tu	We	Th	Fr	Sa
		1	2	3	4	5
6	7	8	9	10	11	12
13	14	15	16	17	18	19
20	21	22	23	24	25	26
27	28	29	30	31

The following events occurred in December 1942:

== December 1, 1942 (Tuesday) ==
- Japanese aircraft sank the Australian corvette HMAS Armidale in the Timor Sea.
- German forces in Tunisia commanded by Albert Kesselring counterattacked at Tebourba and began pushing the Allies back.
- The Beveridge Report was published in the United Kingdom, providing the blueprint for a postwar welfare state that would provide citizens with social security insurance.
- Fuel rationing began in the United States.
- E. Raymond Sharp was named manager of the National Advisory Committee for Aeronautics' Aircraft Engine Research Laboratory (now the Glenn Research Center) in Cleveland, Ohio.
- Born: John Crowley, fantasy and science fiction writer, in Presque Isle, Maine
- Died: Leon Wachholz, 75, Polish scientist and medical examiner, in Kraków

== December 2, 1942 (Wednesday) ==
- Manhattan Project: A team of scientists led by Enrico Fermi achieved the first self-sustained nuclear chain reaction at Chicago Pile-1.
- Battle of Skerki Bank: British ships attacked an Italian troop convoy near the Skerki Banks between Sicily and Tunisia, sinking all four troop and cargo ships as well as the destroyer Folgore. Over 2,000 Italians perished.
- Benito Mussolini addressed the Chamber of Fasces and Corporations for the first time in eighteen months, reporting on the present state of the war and insisting that "The last word has not yet been spoken." Mussolini advised the population to evacuate Italian cities, causing a panic as there was no planning or organisation to do it.
- British destroyer Quentin was sunk by German aircraft off North Africa.

== December 3, 1942 (Thursday) ==
- Adolf Hitler placed all Axis forces in Tunisia under the newly created Headquarters, 5th Panzer Army and gave the new command to Hans-Jürgen von Arnim.
- British destroyer Penylan was sunk in the English channel by German U-boats.
- German submarine U-534 was commissioned.
- Born:
  - Pedro Rocha, footballer, in Salto, Uruguay (d. 2013);
  - Alice Schwarzer, feminist, in Wuppertal, Germany
- Died: Blanche Selva, 58, French pianist and composer

== December 4, 1942 (Friday) ==
- Carlson's Patrol ended in Allied victory.
- American planes bombed Italy for the first time when 20 B-24s raided Naples.
- The Italian cruiser Muzio Attendolo was bombed and sunk in Naples Harbour.
- Canadian Prime Minister William Lyon Mackenzie King met with U.S. President Franklin D. Roosevelt in Washington.
- President Roosevelt wrote a letter ordering the Works Progress Administration to be dissolved with an "honorable discharge".
- The swashbuckler film The Black Swan starring Tyrone Power and Maureen O'Hara was released.
- Born: Gemma Jones, actress, in Marylebone, London, England

== December 5, 1942 (Saturday) ==
- Almost exactly one year after Pearl Harbor, the U.S. Navy publicly revealed the extent of losses suffered in the attack.
- Two pilots flew the new American Republic P-47 Thunderbolt fighter plane a record 725 miles per hour.
- To solve America's manpower shortage, President Roosevelt suspended the induction of all men over age 38 into the armed forces. That same day, he transferred responsibility for all manpower issues and the Selective Service system over to the War Manpower Commission headed by Paul V. McNutt.
- German submarine U-734 was commissioned.
- The Toronto RCAF Hurricanes defeated the Winnipeg RCAF Bombers 8–5 to win the 30th Grey Cup of Canadian football.

== December 6, 1942 (Sunday) ==
- 93 aircraft of the Royal Air Force conducted a bombing raid on Eindhoven targeting the Philips Radio Works. The building was heavily damaged but the RAF lost 13 planes in the attack.
- Stary Ciepielów and Rekówka massacre: 5 families in Occupied Poland were executed by the Ordnungspolizei as part of the German retribution against Poles who helped Jews.
- The horror film Cat People starring Simone Simon, Kent Smith, Tom Conway and Jane Randolph was premiered in New York City.
- Born: Peter Handke, novelist, playwright and political activist, in Griffen, Austria
- Died: Amos Rusie, 71, American baseball player

== December 7, 1942 (Monday) ==
- Operation Frankton: A small unit of Royal Marines began raiding shipping in the French port of Bordeaux.
- The British ocean liner Ceramic was torpedoed and sunk west of the Azores by German submarine U-515. There was only one survivor of the 657 people aboard and he was taken aboard U-515 as a prisoner of war.
- The Bell P-63 Kingcobra had its first flight.
- Born:
  - Harry Chapin, folk rock singer-songwriter, in Brooklyn, New York (killed 1981);
  - Peter Tomarken, television personality, in Olean, New York (d. 2006)
- Died: Orland Steen Loomis, 49, American lawyer and governor-elect of Wisconsin (heart attack)

== December 8, 1942 (Tuesday) ==
- German forces occupied the Tunisian city of Bizerte.
- German submarine U-254 sank in the Atlantic Ocean after an accidental collision with U-221.
- German submarine U-611 was depth charged and sunk off Cape Farewell, Greenland by a British Liberator bomber.
- Born: Bob Love, basketball player, in Bastrop, Louisiana (d. 2024)

== December 9, 1942 (Wednesday) ==
- During the Battle of Buna–Gona, the Australians captured Gona from the Japanese.
- The British destroyer Porcupine was torpedoed and damaged beyond repair northeast of Oran, Algeria by German submarine U-602.
- The British corvette Marigold was torpedoed and sunk in the Mediterranean by Italian Savoia-Marchetti SM.79 aircraft with the loss of 40 of her 85 crew.
- German submarine U-276 was commissioned.
- Born:
  - Dick Butkus, football player, in Chicago, Illinois (d. 2023)
  - Joe McGinniss, author, in New York City (d. 2014)
- Died: Harry Trihey, 64, Canadian ice hockey player and executive

== December 10, 1942 (Thursday) ==
- German tank infantry columns attacked Majaz al Bab in Tunisia but were repulsed.
- British and Canadian governments announced that they had given instructions that German prisoners of war were to be unshackled on December 12.
- The Bank of Thailand opened.
- German submarine U-952 was commissioned.
- Born: Peter Sarstedt, Indian-born British folk and pop musician, in Delhi (d. 2017)

== December 11, 1942 (Friday) ==
- The Battle of El Agheila began in North Africa.
- Italian manned torpedoes and commando frogmen conducted the Raid on Algiers, sinking 2 Allied cargo ships and damaging 3 other vessels although 16 commandos were captured.
- British destroyer HMS Blean was torpedoed and sunk northwest of Oran by German submarine U-443.
- Born:
  - Derek Parfit, philosopher, in Chengdu, China (d. 2017);
  - Ananda Shankar, musician, in Almora, British India (d. 1999)

== December 12, 1942 (Saturday) ==
- The Germans began Operation Winter Storm, an attempt to break the Soviet encirclement of the 6th Army at Stalingrad.
- The Soviets began a winter offensive codenamed Operation Little Saturn.
- Operation Frankton ended in British victory.
- 99 civilians and military personnel perished in the Knights of Columbus Hostel fire in St. John's, Newfoundland. The fire was likely an incidence of enemy sabotage carried out by Nazi agents.
- The Royal Navy submarine P222 was most likely sunk off Capri by an Italian torpedo boat.
- German submarine U-219 was commissioned.
- Died: Helen Westley, 67, American character actress

== December 13, 1942 (Sunday) ==
- Rommel withdrew from El Agheila to Buerat, despite Hitler's insistence that he must not retreat.
- Jews in Britain observed a day of mourning for the victims of Nazi genocide.
- The Washington Redskins defeated the Chicago Bears 14–6 in the NFL Championship Game played at Griffith Stadium in Washington, D.C.
- Born:
  - Howard Brenton, playwright and screenwriter, in Portsmouth, England;
  - Ferguson Jenkins, baseball player, in Chatham, Ontario, Canada

== December 14, 1942 (Monday) ==
- Ethiopia declared war on Germany, Italy and Japan.
- The British cruiser Argonaut was torpedoed and heavily damaged in the Mediterranean by Italian submarine Mocenigo. Repairs took until November 1943 to complete.

== December 15, 1942 (Tuesday) ==
- The Battle of Mount Austen, the Galloping Horse, and the Sea Horse began on Guadalcanal.
- German submarine U-626 was depth charged and sunk in the Atlantic Ocean by the U.S. Coast Guard cutter Ingham.
- Born:
  - Kathleen Blanco, American politician, Governor of Louisiana, in New Orleans (d. 2019);
  - Dave Clark, musician, songwriter, record producer and leader of The Dave Clark Five, in Tottenham, North London, England

== December 16, 1942 (Wednesday) ==
- The Soviets began the Tatsinskaya Raid.
- Björn Þórðarson became the 9th Prime Minister of Iceland.
- German submarines U-420 and U-669 were commissioned.
- Died: Alex Campbell, 66, Scottish golfer and golf course architect

== December 17, 1942 (Thursday) ==
- The Joint Declaration by Members of the United Nations was issued, condemning the Holocaust in Nazi-occupied Europe.
- The Volga River finally froze over, allowing Soviet forces in Stalingrad to be resupplied.
- While escorting the convoy ON 153, the British destroyer Firedrake was torpedoed and sunk by German submarine U-211.
- German submarine U-953 was commissioned.
- The romantic drama film Random Harvest starring Ronald Colman and Greer Garson was released.
- Born:
  - Muhammadu Buhari, 7th and 15th President of Nigeria, in Daura, Nigeria (d. 2025)
  - Paul Butterfield, blues singer and harmonica player, in Chicago, Illinois (d. 1987)

== December 18, 1942 (Friday) ==
- The Battle of El Agheila ended in Allied victory.
- Benito Mussolini sent Galeazzo Ciano to meet with Hitler at the Wolf's Lair. Ciano carried Mussolini's message urging Hitler to seek a separate peace with the Soviets, but Hitler strongly rejected the idea.
- The Japanese light cruiser Tenryū was torpedoed and sunk off Madang, New Guinea by the American submarine Albacore.
- The British P-class destroyer Partridge was torpedoed and sunk west of Oran by German submarine U-565.
- The Allies began Operation Lilliput, a regular transportation service of troops, weapons and supplies between Milne Bay and Oro Bay in New Guinea.
- German submarine U-361 was commissioned.

== December 19, 1942 (Saturday) ==
- Erich von Manstein's forces reached a point 30 miles south of Stalingrad, which would be their farthest advance.
- German submarine U-235 was commissioned.
- Born: Gene Okerlund, professional wrestling interviewer and announcer, in Robbinsdale, Minnesota (d. 2019)

== December 20, 1942 (Sunday) ==
- Operation Mars ended in Soviet operational failure.
- Japanese planes attacked Calcutta overnight in the city's first raid of the war.
- Born: Bob Hayes, Olympic sprinter and football player, in Jacksonville, Florida (d. 2002)

== December 21, 1942 (Monday) ==
- British troops crossed from India back into Burma and headed toward Akyab.
- German submarines U-277 and U-487 were commissioned.
- Born:
  - Hu Jintao, General Secretary of the Chinese Communist Party from 2002 to 2012, in Taizhou, Jiangsu, China;
  - Carla Thomas, singer, in Memphis, Tennessee
- Died: Franz Boas, 84, German-born American anthropologist

== December 22, 1942 (Tuesday) ==
- The Soviets retook Morozovsk.
- German submarine U-200 was commissioned.
- Died:
  - Arvid Harnack, 41, German jurist, economist and resistance fighter (executed);
  - Harro Schulze-Boysen, 33, German officer and resistance fighter (executed);
  - Libertas Schulze-Boysen, 29, German resistance fighter (executed)
  - Elisabeth Schumacher, 38, German resistance, Red Orchestra member (executed)
  - Kurt Schumacher, 37, German resistance, Red Orchestra member (executed)

== December 23, 1942 (Wednesday) ==
- Operation Winter Storm ended with the German 6th Army still trapped in the Stalingrad pocket.
- German submarines U-308, U-535 and U-954 were commissioned.
- Born: Jerry Koosman, baseball player, in Appleton, Minnesota

== December 24, 1942 (Thursday) ==
- Soviet tanks broke through German defenses at Tatsinskaya Airfield in Rostov Oblast, an important airfield flying supplies to Stalingrad. 124 Ju 52 transport planes were able to evacuate, but 46 other aircraft were damaged, destroyed or left behind.
- The Soviet 62nd Army retook the Red October factory in Stalingrad.
- Died: François Darlan, 61, French Admiral of the Fleet (assassinated)

== December 25, 1942 (Friday) ==
- Pope Pius XII delivered the Christmas address over Vatican Radio denouncing the extermination of people based on race, though it was carefully worded in general terms rather than specifically condemning the Nazis.
- The British Eighth Army occupied Sirte.
- British submarine P48 was sunk in the Gulf of Tunis by Italian torpedo boats.
- A French military tribunal sentenced Admiral Darlan's assassin Fernand Bonnier de La Chapelle to death.
- The adventure film Arabian Nights starring Sabu, Maria Montez and Jon Hall was released.

== December 26, 1942 (Saturday) ==
- Rommel halted at Buerat, where he was ordered by Mussolini to make a stand.
- German submarine U-357 was depth charged, rammed and sunk northwest of Ireland by British destroyers Hesperus and Vanessa.
- Born: Gray Davis, 37th Governor of California, in the Bronx, New York
- Died: Fernand Bonnier de La Chapelle, 20, French Resistance fighter and assassin of François Darlan (executed)

== December 27, 1942 (Sunday) ==
- On Guadalcanal, an American attempt to take Mount Asten was repulsed by the Japanese.
- The fifth National Football League All-Star Game was held at Shibe Park in Philadelphia. An all-star team defeated the Washington Redskins 17–14.
- The Union of Pioneers of Yugoslavia was founded.
- A train collision occurred in Almonte, Ontario killing 36.

== December 28, 1942 (Monday) ==
- The Tatsinskaya Raid ended in Soviet strategic victory.
- Hitler issued Directive No. 47, concerning command and defense measures in the southeast. The directive referred to the possibility of attacks in the region of Crete and the Balkans.
- German submarine U-735 was commissioned.
- Born: Allan Schwartzberg, drummer and record producer, in New York City

== December 29, 1942 (Tuesday) ==
- The Soviets retook Kotelnikovo south of Stalingrad.
- German submarine U-713 was commissioned.
- Born: Rajesh Khanna, actor, film producer and politician, in Amritsar, Punjab, British India (d. 2012)

== December 30, 1942 (Wednesday) ==
- The Soviets retook Remontnoye in the Remontnensky District.
- Frank Sinatra performed his first solo concert at the Paramount Theatre in New York City. Sinatra later recalled being "scared stiff" when the audience of 5,000 bobby soxers shrieked and screamed continuously for America's new teen idol.
- The musical film Star Spangled Rhythm featuring an all-star cast including Victor Moore, Betty Hutton, Bob Hope and Bing Crosby premiered in New York City.
- Born:
  - Betty Aberlin, actress, poet and writer, in New York City;
  - Allan Gotthelf, philosopher, in Brooklyn, New York (d. 2013);
  - Michael Nesmith, musician, actor, businessman and member of The Monkees, in Houston, Texas (d. 2021);
  - Janko Prunk, historian, in Loka pri Zidanem Mostu, Slovenia
- Died: Nevile Henderson, 60, British diplomat and ambassador

== December 31, 1942 (Thursday) ==
- The Battle of the Barents Sea was fought between the Kriegsmarine and British ships escorting convoy JW 51B to Kola Inlet. The British destroyer Achates was sunk while the Germans lost the destroyer Z16 Friedrich Eckoldt. All 14 merchant ships reached their destination so the battle was a strategic British victory.
- Emperor Hirohito gave Japanese commanders permission to withdraw their forces from Guadalcanal.
- Hitler issued an Order of the Day to the German armed forces declaring, "The year 1943 will perhaps be hard but certainly not harder than the one just behind us."
- German submarine U-388 was commissioned.
- Born: Andy Summers, guitarist (The Police), in Poulton-le-Fylde, Lancashire, England
