= HMS Spey (K246) =

River-class frigate of the Royal Navy and Egyptian Navy

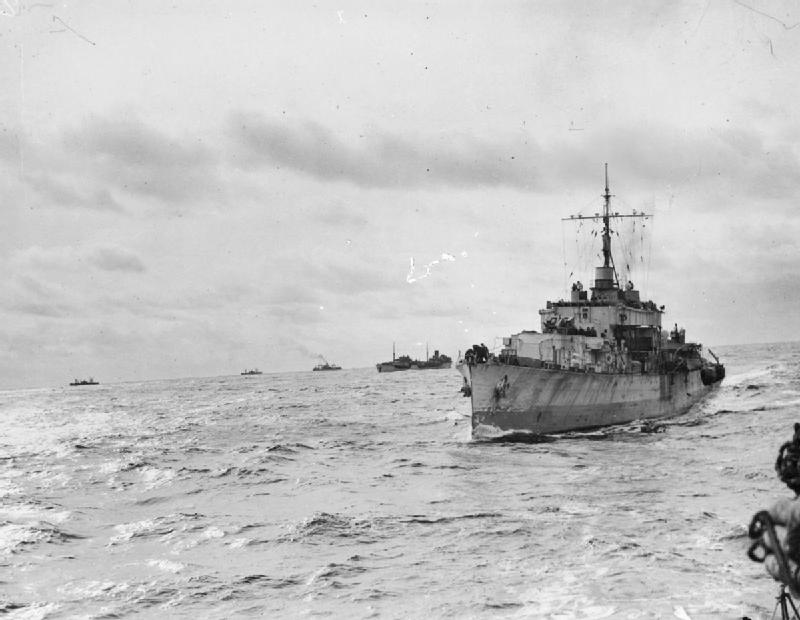
- HMS Spey passing ships in a convoy during the Second World War (IWM)

History

United Kingdom
- Name: Spey
- Namesake: River Spey
- Builder: Smiths Dock Co., South Bank-on-Tees
- Laid down: 18 July 1941
- Launched: 18 December 1941
- Commissioned: 19 May 1942
- Identification: Pennant number: K246
- Honours and awards: Atlantic 194-44; Normandy 1944; Burma 1944-45
- Fate: Sold to Egypt November 1948

Egypt
- Name: Rasheed
- Acquired: November 1948
- Fate: Scrapped, 1994

General characteristics
- Class & type: River-class frigate
- Displacement: 1,370 long tons (1,390 t); 1,830 long tons (1,860 t) (deep load)
- Length: 283 ft (86.26 m) p/p; 301.25 ft (91.82 m)o/a
- Beam: 36.5 ft (11.13 m)
- Draught: 9 ft (2.74 m); 13 ft (3.96 m) (deep load)
- Propulsion: 2 x Admiralty 3-drum boilers, 2 shafts, reciprocating vertical triple expansion, 5,500 ihp
- Speed: 20 knots (37.0 km/h)
- Range: 440 long tons (450 t; 490 short tons) oil fuel; 7,200 nautical miles (13,334 km) at 12 knots (22.2 km/h)
- Complement: 107
- Armament: 2 × QF 4 in (102 mm) /40 Mk.XIX guns, single mounts CP Mk.XXIII; up to 10 x QF 20 mm Oerlikon A/A on twin mounts Mk.V and single mounts Mk.III; 1 × Hedgehog 24 spigot A/S projector; up to 150 depth charges

HMS Spey (K246) was a River-class frigate of the Royal Navy (RN). She was active during the Second World War and was a successful anti-submarine warfare vessel, being credited with the destruction of three U-boats. In 1948 she was sold to the Egyptian Navy.

== Construction ==
Spey was built to the RN's specifications as a Group I River-class frigate. She was laid down at Smiths Dock Co., South Bank-on-Tees on 19 July 1941 and launched on 18 December 1941. The ship was commissioned the following year and was the second ship in the Royal Navy to carry the name, after the River Spey in Scotland. She was adopted by the civil community of Letchworth in Hertfordshire as part of Warship Week in 1942.

== War service ==
Spey was initially assigned to Western Approaches Command for convoy defence duties. She saw extensive service on convoy escort missions. On 11 July 1942, while operating with Convoy OS 33, she shared the credit for the sinking of U-136. In November 1942 she was deployed to the Mediterranean for convoy defence and support of the landings in Italy, code-named Operation Torch. During this operation the troopship Thomas Stone, with 1450 troops on board, was torpedoed. Spey and destroyers Wishart and Velox stood by while she was taken in tow; Spey eventually took some 800 troops on board and delivered the to Algiers. In April 1943 Spey was assigned to 1st Support Group, and in May assisted in the defence of convoys ONS 5, and SC 130. In February 1944, as senior ship of 10th Escort Group, Spey sank two U-boats in 24 hours, described by Blair as "a record of sorts". On 18 February, while escorting ON 224, Spey found and attacked U-406, sinking her with depth-charges and gunfire; The following day she found and destroyed U-386 in the same manner. In May 1944 she was withdrawn from operations, as she was due for refit.

Following refit she sailed for Ceylon and by the end of 1944 was deployed for convoy defence and support of operations in Burma. In January 1945 this included support for landings on the northern shore of Ramree Island. In July 1945 she was prepared to support the proposed landing operations in Malaya. On return to the UK she was laid up in reserve.

== Post-war service ==
Spey was sold to the Egyptian Navy in November 1948. She was refitted by Willougby (Plymouth) Ltd and sailed for Egypt in April 1950. During her service with the Egyptian Navy she is reported as having been used as a submarine support ship before being scrapped.

== Successes ==
During her service Spey was credited with the destruction of three U-boats:

Date	U-boat	Type	Location	Notes
11 July 1942	U-136	Type VIIC	33°30′N 22°52′W; Atlantic, NW of Madeira	d/c by Spey, British sloop Pelican and Free French destroyer Léopard
18 February 1944	U-406	Type VIIC	48°32′N 23°36′W; Atlantic, SW of Cape Clear	d/c by Spey
19 February 1944	U-386	Type VIIC	48°51′N 22°41′W; Atlantic	d/c by Spey

== Bibliography ==
- Clay Blair (1996): Hitler's U-Boat War Vol I:The Hunters 1939-1942. Cassell ISBN 0-304-35260-8
- Clay Blair (1998): Hitler's U-Boat War Vol II:The Hunted 1942-1945. Cassell ISBN 0-304-35261-6
- Colledge, J. J.; Warlow, Ben (2006) [1969]. Ships of the Royal Navy: The Complete Record of All Fighting Ships of the Royal Navy from the 15th Century to the Present (3rd Rev ed.). London: Chatham Publishing. ISBN 978-1-86176-281-8. OCLC 67375475.
- Paul Kemp ( 1997): U-Boats Destroyed. Arms & Armour ISBN 1 85409 515 3
- Lavery, Brian (2006). River-Class Frigates and the Battle of the Atlantic: A Technical and Social History. London: National Maritime Museum. ISBN 0-948065-73-7.
- Lenton, H. T. (1998). British & Empire Warships of the Second World War. Annapolis, Maryland: Naval Institute Press. ISBN 1-55750-048-7.
- Marriott, Leo (1983). Royal Navy Frigates 1945–1983. Ian Allan. ISBN 0-7110-1322-5.
- Axel Niestle (1998): German U-Boat Losses during World War II. Greenhill ISBN 1 85367 352 8
