= Convoy ON 153 =

Convoy ON.153
- Part of World War II
| Date | 11 December 1942 – 31 December 1942 |
| Location | North Atlantic |
| Result | German tactical victory |

Belligerents
| Germany | United Kingdom; Canada |

Commanders and leaders
| Admiral Karl Dönitz | Rear-Admiral Sir E Manners KBE |

Strength
| 13 U-boats | 45 merchant ships 6 escorts |

Casualties and losses
| | 3 ships sunk 1 Damaged; 249 killed |

Convoy ON 153 was the 153rd of the numbered series of ON convoys of merchant ships Outbound from the British Isles to North America. The World War II convoy departed Liverpool on 11 December 1942 and was met on 12 December by Mid-Ocean Escort Force Group B-7. Two merchant ships and the escort group leader were sunk in a North Atlantic battle with U-boat Wolf pack Raufbold before reaching the Western Ocean Meeting Point (WOMP) where the Western Local Escort Force assumed responsibility for the convoy on 23 December. Surviving ships reached New York City on 31 December.

== Escorts ==
The convoy was protected by Escort Group B-7 comprising

- 2 Destroyers

- Royal Navy – HMS Chesterfield, HMS Firedrake

- 4 Corvettes

- Royal Navy - HMS Alisma, HMS Pink, HMS Snowflake, HMS Sunflower

- 1 Replenishment oiler

- British Lady

and by a Western Local Escort Force of

- 1 Destroyer

- Royal Canadian Navy – HMCS Annapolis

- 3 Corvettes

- Royal Canadian Navy - HMCS Buctouche, HMCS Edmundston, HMCS Timmins

- 1 Minesweeper

- Royal Canadian Navy - HMCS Minas

== U-boats ==
The convoy was attacked by 13 U-boats from Wolfpack Raufbold, namely

- U-135, U-203, U-211, U-356, U-409, U-410, U-439, U-600, U-609, U-610, U-621, U-623 and U-664

== Ships in the convoy ==
| Name | Flag | Tonnage (GRT) | Notes |
|---|---|---|---|
| HMS Alisma | Royal Navy | | Escort 12 Dec - 23 Dec. Corvette |
| Amstelkerk (1929) | Netherlands | 4,457 | Bound for Freetown |
| HMCS Annapolis | Royal Canadian Navy | | Escort 25 Dec - 27 Dec. Destroyer |
| Antilochus (1906) | United Kingdom | 9,082 | Bound for South Africa |
| Argolikos (1921) | Greece | 4,786 | Bound for St John's, Newfoundland |
| Asbjorn (1935) | United Kingdom | 4,387 | Bound for Halifax, Nova Scotia |
| Bello (1930) | Norway | 6,125 | Sunk by U-610 On 16 Dec. 33 of 40 crew died. Survivors picked up by HMS Pink (K137) |
| Bornholm (1930) | United Kingdom | 3,177 | Returned |
| British Lady (1923) | United Kingdom | 6,098 | Replenishment oiler |
| HMCS Buctouche | Royal Canadian Navy | | Escort 23 Dec - 31 Dec. Corvette |
| Canada (1921) | Sweden | 5,527 | 12 passengers |
| HMS Chesterfield | Royal Navy | | Escort 12 Dec - 19 Dec. Destroyer |
| City of Hongkong (1924) | United Kingdom | 9,609 | 150 passengers. Bound for Karachi |
| City of Lille (1928) | United Kingdom | 6,588 | Bound for Basra |
| Comedian (1929) | United Kingdom | 5,122 | Bound for Halifax, Nova Scotia |
| HMCS Edmundston | Royal Canadian Navy | | Escort 23 Dec - 29 Dec. Corvette |
| Emile Francqui (1929) | Belgium | 5,859 | 11 Passengers. Sunk by U-664 on 16 Dec. 46 dead. |
| Empire Grenadier (1942) | United Kingdom | 9,811 | Bound for New York City |
| Empire Highway (1942) | United Kingdom | 7,166 | Bound for Beira |
| HMS Firedrake | Royal Navy | | Escort 12 Dec - 17 Dec. Destroyer. Sunk by U-211 on 17 Dec. Broke in two in heavy weather. 170 of 196 crew died. Survivors picked up by HMS Sunflower |
| Geo W McKnight (1933) | United Kingdom | 2,502 | Bound for New York City |
| Gulf of Mexico (1917) | United States | 7,807 | Bound for New York City |
| Hilary (1931) | United Kingdom | 7,403 | 365 Passengers, Bound for Freetown |
| Idefjord (1921) | Norway | 4,287 | Bound for Halifax |
| Jan Van Goyen (1919) | Netherlands | 5,704 | Fell Out Disabled |
| Kaldfonn (1936) | Norway | 9,931 | |
| Mafuta (1920) | Belgium | 6,322 | Bound for Freetown |
| Magdala (1931) | Netherlands | 8,248 | Bound for New York City |
| Mahana (1917) | United Kingdom | 10,951 | Bound for New York City |
| Marquesa (1918) | United Kingdom | 8,979 | Bound for Montevideo |
| HMCS Minas | Royal Canadian Navy | | Escort 25 Dec - 31 Dec. Minesweeper |
| Norbris (1930) | Panama | 7,619 | Bound for New York City |
| North Gaspe (1938) | United Kingdom | 888 | |
| Nueva Granada (1937) | Norway | 9,968 | Bound for New York City |
| Otina (1938) | United Kingdom | 6,217 | Straggled |
| Pandorian (1941) | United Kingdom | 4,159 | Bound for New York City. Rear-Admiral Sir E Manners KBE (Commodore) |
| HMS Pink | Royal Navy | | Escort 12 Dec - 20 Dec. Corvette |
| Regent Lion (1937) | United Kingdom | 9,551 | Tanker. Torpedoed and damaged by U-610 on 16 Feb. Hulk towed to Falmouth, Cornwall, arriving 5 Jan 43 |
| Robert F Hand (1933) | United Kingdom | 2,197 | Bound for New York City |
| Saint Bertrand (1929) | United Kingdom | 5,522 | Bound for Saint John, New Brunswick |
| Salamis (1939) | Norway | 8,286 | Bound for New York City |
| San Andres (1921) | Norway | 1,975 | Returned |
| Sandanger (1938) | Norway | 9,432 | Bound for New York City |
| Santos (1928) | Norway | 4,639 | Bound for Halifax, Nova Scotia |
| HMS Snowflake | Royal Navy | | Escort 12 Dec - 23 Dec. Corvette |
| Solstad (1927) | Norway | 5,952 | Bound for New York City |
| Sovac (1938) | United Kingdom | 6,724 | Bound for New York City |
| HMS Sunflower | Royal Navy | | Escort 12 Dec - 23 Dec. Corvette |
| Tetela (1926) | United Kingdom | 5,389 | 10 Passengers, Bound for New York City. Vice-commodore is Ship's Master |
| HMCS Timmins | Royal Canadian Navy | | Escort 23 Dec - 31 Dec. Corvette |
| Torr Head (1937) | United Kingdom | 5,021 | Bound for Saint John, New Brunswick |
| Tortuguero (1921) | United Kingdom | 5,285 | 10 Passengers. Bound for Halifax, Nova Scotia |
| Tucurinca (1926) | United Kingdom | 5,412 | 10 Passengers. Bound for Halifax, Nova Scotia |
| Vaalaren (1936) | Sweden | 3,406 | Bound for New York City |
| Vestfold (1931) | Panama | 4,547 | Bound for New York City |
| Villanger (1929) | Norway | 4,884 | Bound for New York City |
| Walter Jennings (1921) | United States | 9,564 | Bound for New York City |

== Bibliography ==
- Hague, Arnold (2000). The Allied Convoy System 1939–1945. ISBN 1-86176-147-3.
- Tramp to Queen autobiography by Capt. John Treasure Jones, The History Press (2008) ISBN 978 0 7524 4625 7
