= German submarine U-225 =

German World War II submarine

History

Nazi Germany
- Name: U-225
- Ordered: 15 August 1940
- Builder: Germaniawerft, Kiel
- Cost: 4,439,000 Reichsmark
- Yard number: 655
- Laid down: 3 September 1941
- Launched: 28 May 1942
- Commissioned: 11 July 1942
- Fate: Sunk 22 February 1943

General characteristics
- Class & type: Type VIIC submarine
- Displacement: 769 tonnes (757 long tons) surfaced; 871 t (857 long tons) submerged
- Length: 67.10 m (220 ft 2 in) o/a; 50.50 m (165 ft 8 in) pressure hull
- Beam: 6.20 m (20 ft 4 in) o/a; 4.70 m (15 ft 5 in) pressure hull
- Height: 9.60 m (31 ft 6 in)
- Draught: 4.74 m (15 ft 7 in)
- Installed power: 2,800–3,200 PS (2,100–2,400 kW; 2,800–3,200 bhp) (diesels); 750 PS (550 kW; 740 shp) (electric)
- Propulsion: 2 shafts; 2 × diesel engines; 2 × electric motors
- Speed: 17.7 knots (32.8 km/h; 20.4 mph) surfaced; 7.6 knots (14.1 km/h; 8.7 mph) submerged
- Range: 8,500 nmi (15,700 km; 9,800 mi) at 10 knots (19 km/h; 12 mph) surfaced; 80 nmi (150 km; 92 mi) at 4 knots (7.4 km/h; 4.6 mph) submerged
- Test depth: 230 m (750 ft); Crush depth: 250–295 m (820–968 ft)
- Complement: 4 officers, 40–56 enlisted
- Armament: 5 × 53.3 cm (21 in) torpedo tubes (four bow, one stern); 14 × torpedoes or 26 TMA mines; 1 × 8.8 cm (3.46 in) deck gun (220 rounds); 1 x 2 cm (0.79 in) C/30 AA gun

Service record
- Part of: 5th U-boat Flotilla; 11 July – 31 December 1942; 1st U-boat Flotilla; 1 January – 22 February 1943
- Identification codes: M 10 643
- Commanders: Oblt.z.S. Wolfgang Leimkühler; 11 July 1942 – 22 February 1943
- Operations: 2 patrols: 1st patrol: 5 December 1942 – 8 January 1943; 2nd patrol: 2 – 22 February 1943
- Victories: 1 merchant ship sunk (5,273 GRT); 4 merchant ships damaged (24,672 GRT)

German submarine U-225 was a Type VIIC U-boat of Nazi Germany's Kriegsmarine during World War II.

Ordered on 15 August 1940 from the Germaniawerft shipyard in Kiel, she was laid down on 3 September 1941 as yard number 655, launched on 28 May 1942 and commissioned on 11 July.

== Design ==
German Type VIIC submarines were preceded by the shorter Type VIIB submarines. U-225 had a displacement of 769 tonnes (757 long tons) when at the surface and 871 tonnes (857 long tons) while submerged. She had a total length of 67.10 m (220 ft 2 in), a pressure hull length of 50.50 m (165 ft 8 in), a beam of 6.20 m (20 ft 4 in), a height of 9.60 m (31 ft 6 in), and a draught of 4.74 m (15 ft 7 in). The submarine was powered by two Germaniawerft F46 four-stroke, six-cylinder supercharged diesel engines producing a total of 2,800 to 3,200 metric horsepower (2,060 to 2,350 kW; 2,760 to 3,160 shp) for use while surfaced, two AEG GU 460/8–27 double-acting electric motors producing a total of 750 metric horsepower (550 kW; 740 shp) for use while submerged. She had two shafts and two 1.23 m (4 ft) propellers. The boat was capable of operating at depths of up to 230 metres (750 ft).

The submarine had a maximum surface speed of 17.7 knots (32.8 km/h; 20.4 mph) and a maximum submerged speed of 7.6 knots (14.1 km/h; 8.7 mph). When submerged, the boat could operate for 80 nautical miles (150 km; 92 mi) at 4 knots (7.4 km/h; 4.6 mph); when surfaced, she could travel 8,500 nautical miles (15,700 km; 9,800 mi) at 10 knots (19 km/h; 12 mph). U-225 was fitted with five 53.3 cm (21 in) torpedo tubes (four fitted at the bow and one at the stern), fourteen torpedoes, one 8.8 cm (3.46 in) SK C/35 naval gun, 220 rounds, and an anti-aircraft gun. The boat had a complement of between forty-four and sixty.

== Service history ==
=== First patrol ===
She departed from Kiel on her first patrol on 5 December 1942. It was during this patrol that she successfully attacked five vessels in convoy ONS 154. She returned to Brest on 8 January 1943.

=== Final Patrol ===
Less than one month later, she departed from Brest on her second and final patrol on 2 February 1943. After just 21 days, she was sunk.

=== Fate ===
U-225 was attacked and sunk with depth charges by HMS Dianthus with the loss of all 46 crew on 22 February 1943 at position 48°37′N 30°35′W.

== Summary of raiding history ==
Date	Ship Name	Nationality	Tonnage (GRT)	Fate
27 December 1942	Scottish Heather	United Kingdom	7,087	Damaged
28 December 1942	Melmore Head	United Kingdom	5,273	Sunk
28 December 1942	Ville de Rouen	United Kingdom	5,598	Damaged
28 December 1942	President Francqui	Belgium	4,919	Damaged
28 December 1942	Empire Shackleton	United Kingdom	7,068	Damaged

== Bibliography ==
- Busch, Rainer; Röll, Hans-Joachim (1999). German U-boat commanders of World War II : a biographical dictionary. Translated by Brooks, Geoffrey. London, Annapolis, Md: Greenhill Books, Naval Institute Press. ISBN 1-55750-186-6.
- Busch, Rainer; Röll, Hans-Joachim (1999). Deutsche U-Boot-Verluste von September 1939 bis Mai 1945 [German U-boat losses from September 1939 to May 1945]. Der U-Boot-Krieg (in German). Vol. IV. Hamburg, Berlin, Bonn: Mittler. ISBN 3-8132-0514-2.
- Edwards, Bernard (1996). Dönitz and the Wolf Packs - The U-boats at War. Cassell Military Classics. pp. 136, 138, 155. ISBN 0-304-35203-9.
- Gröner, Erich (1985). Die deutschen Kriegsschiffe 1815–1945 / 3, U-Boote, Hilfskreuzer, Minenschiffe, Netzleger, Sperrbrecher (in German). Koblenz: Bernard & Graefe. ISBN 3-7637-4802-4. OCLC 310610321.
- Gröner, Erich; Jung, Dieter; Maass, Martin (1991). U-boats and Mine Warfare Vessels. German Warships 1815–1945. Vol. 2. Translated by Thomas, Keith; Magowan, Rachel. London: Conway Maritime Press. ISBN 0-85177-593-4.
