= HMS Firedrake (H79) =

F-class destroyer of Royal Navy

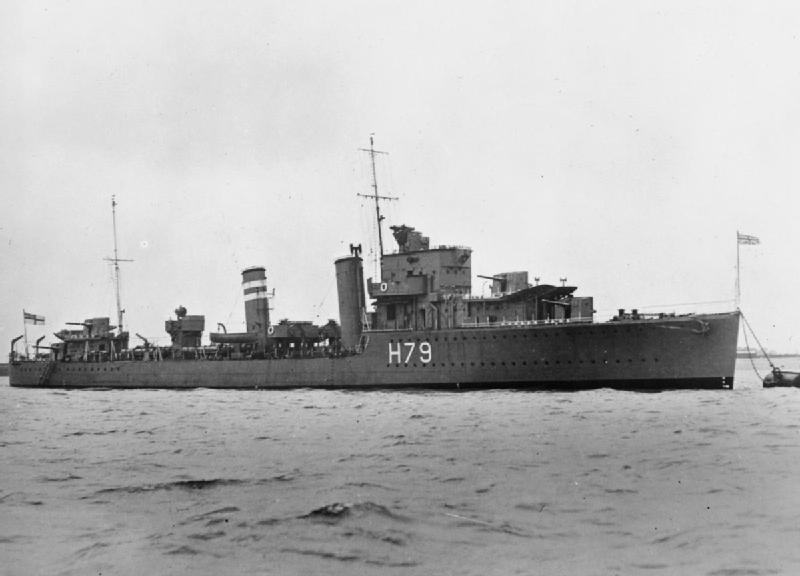
- Firedrake at anchor before 1942

History

United Kingdom
- Name: Firedrake
- Namesake: firedrake
- Ordered: 17 March 1933
- Builder: Parsons Marine Steam Turbine Company, Wallsend
- Laid down: 5 July 1933
- Launched: 28 June 1934
- Commissioned: 30 May 1935
- Motto: Virtute ardens; ("Burning with valour")
- Fate: Sunk, 16/17 December 1942
- Badge

General characteristics (as built)
- Class & type: F-class destroyer
- Displacement: 1,405 long tons (1,428 t) (standard)
- Length: 329 ft (100.3 m) o/a
- Beam: 33 ft 3 in (10.13 m)
- Draught: 12 ft 6 in (3.81 m) (deep)
- Installed power: 3 × Admiralty 3-drum boilers; 36,000 shaft horsepower (27,000 kW)
- Propulsion: 2 × shafts; 2 × geared steam turbines
- Speed: 35.5 knots (65.7 km/h; 40.9 mph)
- Range: 6,350 nmi (11,760 km; 7,310 mi) at 15 knots (28 km/h; 17 mph)
- Complement: 145
- Sensors & processing systems: ASDIC
- Armament: 4 × single 4.7 in (120 mm) guns; 2 × quadruple 0.5 in (12.7 mm) machine guns; 2 × quadruple 21 in (533 mm) torpedo tubes; 20 × depth charges, 1 rack and 2 throwers

HMS Firedrake was an F-class destroyer built for the Royal Navy during the early 1930s. Although assigned to the Home Fleet upon completion, the ship was attached to the Mediterranean Fleet in 1935–36 during the Abyssinia Crisis. During the Spanish Civil War of 1936–39, she spent much time in Spanish waters, enforcing the arms blockade imposed by Britain and France on both sides of the conflict.

Several weeks after the start of the Second World War in September 1939, Firedrake helped to sink a German submarine and took part in the Norwegian Campaign in early 1940. She was sent to Gibraltar in mid-1940 and formed part of Force H where she escorted many Malta convoys in the Mediterranean and helped to sink an Italian submarine. Firedrake participated in the Battle of Cape Spartivento and screened the capital ships of Force H as they bombarded Genoa before she was damaged by an Italian bomb in mid-1941. After her repairs were completed the ship became a convoy escort in the Atlantic at the beginning of 1942. Firedrake was torpedoed and sunk by a German U-boat in December 1942 with the loss of most of her crew.

== Description ==
The F-class ships were repeats of the preceding E-class. They displaced 1,405 long tons (1,428 t) at standard load and 1,940 long tons (1,970 t) at deep load. The ships had an overall length of 329 feet (100.3 m), a beam of 33 feet 3 inches (10.1 m) and a draught of 12 feet 6 inches (3.8 m). They were powered by two Parsons geared steam turbines, each driving one propeller shaft, using steam provided by three Admiralty three-drum boilers. The turbines developed a total of 36,000 shaft horsepower (27,000 kW) and gave a maximum speed of 35.5 knots (65.7 km/h; 40.9 mph). Firedrake barely exceeded her designed speed during her sea trials. She carried a maximum of 470 long tons (480 t) of fuel oil that gave her a range of 6,350 nautical miles (11,760 km; 7,310 mi) at 15 knots (28 km/h; 17 mph). The ships' complement was 145 officers and ratings.

The ships mounted four 4.7-inch (120 mm) Mark IX guns in single mounts, designated 'A', 'B', 'X', and 'Y' in sequence from front to rear. For anti-aircraft (AA) defence, they had two quadruple Mark I mounts for the 0.5 inch Vickers Mark III machine gun. The F class was fitted with two above-water quadruple torpedo tube mounts for 21-inch (533 mm) torpedoes. One depth charge rack and two throwers were fitted; 20 depth charges were originally carried, but this increased to 35 shortly after the war began.

=== Wartime modifications ===
By October 1940, Firedrake had her rear torpedo tube mount replaced by a 12-pounder AA gun. While the ship was under repair in late 1941, 'Y' gun was removed to allow a total of 70 depth charges to be stowed aboard. Several other changes also probably happened during this refit, notably two single 20 mm (0.8 in) Oerlikon light AA guns were installed abreast the bridge and a Type 286 short-range surface search radar was fitted as was a HF/DF radio direction finder mounted on a pole mainmast.

== Construction and career ==
Firedrake, the sixth ship of her name in the Royal Navy, was ordered from Parsons Marine Steam Turbine Company, Wallsend, although her hull was sub-contracted to Vickers Armstrongs. She was laid down at their Barrow shipyard on 5 July, launched on 28 June 1934, the same day as her sister ship, Fame, and completed on 30 April 1935. The ship cost 243,966 pounds, excluding government-furnished equipment like the armament. Firedrake was initially assigned to the 6th Destroyer Flotilla (DF) of the Home Fleet, but was sent to reinforce the Mediterranean Fleet, together with most of her sisters, during the Abyssinian crisis, in September and remained there until December. Firedrake was refitted at Gibraltar from 14 December 1935 to 11 February 1936. She briefly returned home to give leave to the crew later that month, but she returned to the Mediterranean in March and remained there until July when she began a refit at Sheerness Dockyard.

Upon its completion on 30 September, the ship returned to the Mediterranean and began to enforce the arms embargo imposed on both sides in the Spanish Civil War by the Non-Intervention Committee until June 1937. On 23 April 1937, Firedrake, together with the battlecruiser Hood, escorted a British merchantman into Bilbao harbour despite the presence of the Nationalist cruiser Almirante Cervera that attempted to blockade the port. Firedrake returned to Gibraltar in September and resumed patrols in Spanish waters until November when she began another refit at Sheerness that lasted until 30 December. The ship spent another two months at Gibraltar between January and March 1938 and then patrolled the Spanish coastline in the Bay of Biscay a year later. The 6th DF was renumbered the 8th Destroyer Flotilla in April 1939, five months before the start of World War II. Firedrake remained assigned to it until June 1940, escorting the larger ships of the fleet.

=== World War II ===
In September 1939 Firedrake was assigned to the Home Fleet and based at Scapa Flow. In the first month of hostilities she was part of an anti-submarine hunting group centred on the aircraft carrier Ark Royal. On 14 September, the carrier was unsuccessfully attacked by the German submarine U-39. Firedrake, in company with her sisters Faulknor and Foxhound, counter-attacked and sank U-39 north-west of Ireland. On 5 October, the ship rescued survivors from the small freighter SS Glen Farg. In February 1940, she was one of the escorts for Convoy TC 3 carrying troops from Canada to the UK. Firedrake was slightly damaged going alongside the destroyer Icarus at Invergordon on 28 March and was repaired between 2 and 26 April at Cardiff, Wales.

In the Norwegian Campaign, she supported the Allied landings on 12–13 May at Bjerkvik during the Battle of Narvik. The ship continued to provide fire support during the battle for the rest of the month. During the nights of 30 and 31 May, Firedrake helped to evacuate troops from Bodø to Harstad and Borkenes to await further evacuation. She was one of the ships that escorted the troop ships evacuating the troops from the Narvik area on 7 and 8 June. She was slightly damaged by splinters during an aerial attack on 23 May and again on 12 June when her port steering motor and 'A' gun were knocked out of action; her repairs were completed eight days later.

Firedrake was briefly assigned to the 4th Destroyer Flotilla until she rejoined the 8th DF in mid-August as they escorted the battleship Valiant and the new carrier Illustrious from the UK to Gibraltar, arriving on 29 August. The next day, Fury and Force H covered the passage of Valiant and Illustrious through the Western Mediterranean to rendezvous with the Mediterranean Fleet (Operation Hats). On 18 October, she sank the Italian submarine Durbo east of Gibraltar together with the destroyer Wrestler and two Saro London flying boats of 202 Squadron RAF. A boarding party captured cipher and operational documents aboard the boat which led to the sinking of the Italian submarine Lafolè two days later. Between them, the two destroyers rescued 5 officers and 43 ratings. Firedrake escorted the carriers Argus and Ark Royal during Operations Coat and White in November as they flew off aircraft for Malta. The ship escorted Force F to Malta during Operation Collar later in the month and participated in the inconclusive Battle of Cape Spartivento on 27 November, where she was part of the screen for the battlecruiser Renown and the battleship Ramillies.

On 1 January 1941, Firedrake was one of the ships that intercepted a Vichy French convoy off Mellila, Morocco and seized all four merchant ships of the convoy. Later that month, she was involved in Operation Excess. On 31 January 1941, Force H departed Gibraltar to carry out Operation Picket, an unsuccessful night torpedo attack by eight of Ark Royal's Fairey Swordfish on the Tirso Dam in Sardinia. The British ships returned to Gibraltar on 4 February and began preparing for Operation Grog, a naval bombardment of Genoa, that was successfully carried out five days later. The destroyer accidentally ran aground in fog near Gibraltar on 1 March and received preliminary repairs there until 21 April. Final repairs were completed at Chatham Royal Dockyard on 19 June and she rejoined the 8th DF back at Gibraltar shortly afterwards.

During Operation Substance, Firedrake and Foxhound were each leading a column of the convoy, streaming their TSDS minesweeps, through the Sicilian Narrows on 23 July when an Italian 100-kilogram (220 lb) bomb near missed Firedrake and detonated off her port side. The shockwave blew in the plating over No. 1 boiler room and disabled her so that she had to be towed back to Gibraltar by the destroyer Eridge. Temporary repairs were made in Gibraltar and she was transferred to the Boston Navy Yard for repair on 23 September. Firedrake exchanged one 4.7-inch gun for additional depth charges while under repair to better suit her new role as a convoy escort.

After escorting Convoy NA 2 to the UK in January 1942, the ship was assigned to Escort Group B7 of the Mid-Ocean Escort Force. While escorting Convoy ON(S) 94 in May, the escorts drove off U-406. Firedrake received repairs in April on the Clyde and August in Belfast. She rescued survivors from the torpedoed merchantman MV Olaf Fostenes on 26 September. Two months later, the ship was detached to reinforce the escort for Convoy ON 144 on 18 November and helped to prevent any further losses to the convoy. On 16 December, while escorting Convoy ON 153, Firedrake was torpedoed by U-211 at 19:11. She broke in two; the bow section sinking immediately at coordinates 50°50′N 25°15′W, but the stern stayed afloat until 00:45. The corvette Sunflower picked up 26 survivors, but the rest of her crew of 140 men were lost.

== Bibliography ==
- Divine, A. D. (1942). Destroyer's War: A Million Miles by the Eighth Flotilla. John Murray. OCLC 875295237.
- Admiralty Historical Section (2002). The Royal Navy and the Mediterranean: September 1939–October 1940. Whitehall histories, Naval Staff histories. Vol. I. London: Whitehall History in association with Frank Cass. ISBN 0-7146-5179-6.
- Admiralty Historical Section (2002). The Royal Navy and the Mediterranean: November 1940–December 1941. Whitehall histories, Naval Staff histories. Vol. II. London: Whitehall History in association with Frank Cass. ISBN 0-7146-5205-9.
- Colledge, J. J.; Warlow, Ben (2006) [1969]. Ships of the Royal Navy: The Complete Record of All Fighting Ships of the Royal Navy from the 15th Century to the Present (3rd Rev ed.). London: Chatham Publishing. ISBN 978-1-86176-281-8. OCLC 67375475.
- English, John (1993). Amazon to Ivanhoe: British Standard Destroyers of the 1930s. Kendal, England: World Ship Society. ISBN 0-905617-64-9.
- Friedman, Norman (2009). British Destroyers From Earliest Days to the Second World War. Annapolis, Maryland: Naval Institute Press. ISBN 978-1-59114-081-8.
- Haarr, Geirr H. (2010). The Battle for Norway: April–June 1940. Barnsley, UK: Seaforth Publishing. ISBN 978-1-84832-057-4.
- Lenton, H. T. (1998). British & Empire Warships of the Second World War. Annapolis, Maryland: Naval Institute Press. ISBN 1-55750-048-7.
- March, Edgar J. (1966). British Destroyers: A History of Development, 1892–1953; Drawn by Admiralty Permission From Official Records & Returns, Ships' Covers & Building Plans. London: Seeley Service. OCLC 164893555.
- Osborne, Richard (February 2011). "Ration: Royal Navy Operations Against the Vichy French Merchant Fleet 1940–1942". Warships (165). Part One. London: World Ship Society: 21–34. ISSN 0966-6958.
- Rohwer, Jürgen (2005). Chronology of the War at Sea 1939–1945: The Naval History of World War Two (Third Revised ed.). Annapolis, Maryland: Naval Institute Press. ISBN 1-59114-119-2.
- Smith, Peter C. (2004). Destroyer Leader: The Story of HMS Faulknor 1935–46 (3rd revised and expanded ed.). Barnsley, South Yorkshire, UK: Pen & Sword Maritime. ISBN 1-84415-121-2.
- Whitley, M. J. (1988). Destroyers of World War Two: An International Encyclopedia. Annapolis, Maryland: Naval Institute Press. ISBN 0-87021-326-1.
- Treasure Jones, John (2008). Tramp to Queen. The History Press. ISBN 978-0-7524-4625-7.
