= German submarine U-621 =

German World War II submarine

History

Nazi Germany
- Name: U-621
- Ordered: 15 August 1940
- Builder: Blohm & Voss, Hamburg
- Yard number: 597
- Laid down: 1 July 1941
- Launched: 19 March 1942
- Commissioned: 7 May 1942
- Fate: Sunk on 18 August 1944

General characteristics
- Class & type: Type VIIC submarine
- Displacement: 769 tonnes (757 long tons) surfaced; 871 t (857 long tons) submerged
- Length: 67.10 m (220 ft 2 in) o/a; 50.50 m (165 ft 8 in) pressure hull
- Beam: 6.20 m (20 ft 4 in) o/a; 4.70 m (15 ft 5 in) pressure hull
- Height: 9.60 m (31 ft 6 in)
- Draught: 4.74 m (15 ft 7 in)
- Installed power: 2,800–3,200 PS (2,100–2,400 kW; 2,800–3,200 bhp) (diesels); 750 PS (550 kW; 740 shp) (electric)
- Propulsion: 2 shafts; 2 × diesel engines; 2 × electric motors
- Speed: 17.7 knots (32.8 km/h; 20.4 mph) surfaced; 7.6 knots (14.1 km/h; 8.7 mph) submerged
- Range: 8,500 nmi (15,700 km; 9,800 mi) at 10 knots (19 km/h; 12 mph) surfaced; 80 nmi (150 km; 92 mi) at 4 knots (7.4 km/h; 4.6 mph) submerged
- Test depth: 230 m (750 ft); Crush depth: 250–295 m (820–968 ft)
- Complement: 4 officers, 40–56 enlisted
- Armament: 5 × 53.3 cm (21 in) torpedo tubes (four bow, one stern); 14 × torpedoes or 26 TMA mines; 1 × 8.8 cm (3.46 in) deck gun (220 rounds); 1 x 2 cm (0.79 in) C/30 AA gun

Service record
- Part of: 8th U-boat Flotilla; 7 May – 30 September 1942; 9th U-boat Flotilla; 1 October 1942 – 18 August 1944
- Identification codes: M 02 082
- Commanders: Kptlt. Horst Schünemann; 7 May – 4 December 1942; Oblt.z.S. Max Kruschka; 4 December 1942 – 7 May 1944; Oblt.z.S. Hermann Stuckmann; 15 May – 18 August 1944
- Operations: 10 patrols: 1st patrol: 29 September – 5 November 1942; 2nd patrol: 5 December 1942 – 5 January 1943; 3rd patrol: 1 February – 23 March 1943; 4th patrol: 22 April – 3 June 1943; 5th patrol: 22 August – 28 September 1943; 6th patrol: 6 – 23 January 1944; 7th patrol: 21 February – 19 April 1944; 8th patrol: 6 – 23 June 1944; 9th patrol: 15 July – 11 August 1944; 10th patrol: 13 – 18 August 1944
- Victories: 4 merchant ships sunk (20,159 GRT); 1 auxiliary warship sunk (2,938 GRT); 1 merchant ship damaged (10,048 GRT); 1 warship damaged (1,625 tons)

German submarine U-621 was a Type VIIC U-boat built for Nazi Germany's Kriegsmarine for service during World War II. She was laid down on 1 July 1941 by Blohm & Voss in Hamburg as yard number 597, launched on 19 March 1942 and commissioned on 7 May 1942 under Kapitänleutnant Horst Schünemann.

== Design ==
German Type VIIC submarines were preceded by the shorter Type VIIB submarines. U-621 had a displacement of 769 tonnes (757 long tons) when at the surface and 871 tonnes (857 long tons) while submerged. She had a total length of 67.10 m (220 ft 2 in), a pressure hull length of 50.50 m (165 ft 8 in), a beam of 6.20 m (20 ft 4 in), a height of 9.60 m (31 ft 6 in), and a draught of 4.74 m (15 ft 7 in). The submarine was powered by two Germaniawerft F46 four-stroke, six-cylinder supercharged diesel engines producing a total of 2,800 to 3,200 metric horsepower (2,060 to 2,350 kW; 2,760 to 3,160 shp) for use while surfaced, two Brown, Boveri & Cie GG UB 720/8 double-acting electric motors producing a total of 750 metric horsepower (550 kW; 740 shp) for use while submerged. She had two shafts and two 1.23 m (4 ft) propellers. The boat was capable of operating at depths of up to 230 metres (750 ft).

The submarine had a maximum surface speed of 17.7 knots (32.8 km/h; 20.4 mph) and a maximum submerged speed of 7.6 knots (14.1 km/h; 8.7 mph). When submerged, the boat could operate for 80 nautical miles (150 km; 92 mi) at 4 knots (7.4 km/h; 4.6 mph); when surfaced, she could travel 8,500 nautical miles (15,700 km; 9,800 mi) at 10 knots (19 km/h; 12 mph). U-621 was fitted with five 53.3 cm (21 in) torpedo tubes (four fitted at the bow and one at the stern), fourteen torpedoes, one 8.8 cm (3.46 in) SK C/35 naval gun, 220 rounds, and a 2 cm (0.79 in) C/30 anti-aircraft gun. The boat had a complement of between forty-four and sixty.

== Service history ==
The boat's service began on 7 May 1942 for training as part of the 8th U-boat Flotilla. After training was completed she transferred to the 9th flotilla on 1 October 1942 for active service.

In ten patrols she sank four merchant ships for a total of 20,159 gross register tons (GRT), plus one auxiliary warship. She also damaged two more ships.

=== Wolfpacks ===
She took part in eleven wolfpacks, namely:

- Panther (10 – 16 October 1942)
- Puma (16 – 29 October 1942)
- Raufbold (11 – 18 December 1942)
- Hartherz (3 – 7 February 1943)
- Ritter (11 – 26 February 1943)
- Burggraf (4 – 5 March 1942)
- Raubgraf (7 – 15 March 1943)
- Amsel 1 (3 – 6 May 1943)
- Elbe (7 – 10 May 1943)
- Elbe 2 (10 – 14 May 1943)
- Mosel (19 – 24 May 1943)

=== Fate ===
She was sunk by depth charges dropped by three Royal Canadian Navy destroyers, HMCS Ottawa, HMCS Kootenay and HMCS Chaudiere on 18 August 1944 near La Rochelle at position 45°52′N 02°36′W.

== Summary of raiding history ==
Date	Ship Name	Nationality	Tonnage (Note: Merchant ship tonnages are in gross register tons. Military vessels are listed by tons displacement.)	Fate
23 October 1942	Empire Turnstone	United Kingdom	6,113	Sunk
18 December 1942	Oropos	Greece	4,474	Sunk
20 December 1942	Otina	United Kingdom	6,217	Sunk
11 March 1943	Baron Kinnaird	United Kingdom	3,355	Sunk
15 June 1944	USS LST-133	United States Navy	1,625	Damaged
29 July 1944	HMS Prince Leopold	Royal Navy	2,938	Sunk
30 July 1944	Ascanius	United Kingdom	10,048	Damaged

== Bibliography ==
- Busch, Rainer; Röll, Hans-Joachim (1999). German U-boat commanders of World War II : a biographical dictionary. Translated by Brooks, Geoffrey. London, Annapolis, Md: Greenhill Books, Naval Institute Press. ISBN 1-55750-186-6.
- Busch, Rainer; Röll, Hans-Joachim (1999). Der U-Boot-Krieg, 1939-1945: Deutsche U-Boot-Verluste von September 1939 bis Mai 1945 [German U-boat losses from September 1939 to May 1945] (in German). Vol. IV. Hamburg, Berlin, Bonn: Mittler. ISBN 3-8132-0514-2.
- Edwards, Bernard (1996). Dönitz and the Wolf Packs – The U-Boats at War. London, UK: Cassell Military Classics. p. 161. ISBN 0-304-35203-9.
- Gröner, Eric; Jung, Dieter; Maass, Martin (1991). German Warships 1815-1945: U-boats and Mine Warfare Vessels. Vol. 2. Translated by Thomas, Keith; Magowan, Rachel. London: Conway Maritime Press. ISBN 0-85177-593-4.
