= German submarine U-406 =

German type VII C world war II submarine

History

Nazi Germany
- Name: U-406
- Ordered: 16 October 1939
- Builder: Danziger Werft, Danzig
- Yard number: 107
- Laid down: 6 September 1940
- Launched: 16 June 1941
- Commissioned: 22 October 1941
- Fate: Sunk on 18 February 1944

General characteristics
- Class & type: Type VIIC submarine
- Displacement: 769 tonnes (757 long tons) surfaced; 871 t (857 long tons) submerged
- Length: 67.10 m (220 ft 2 in) o/a; 50.50 m (165 ft 8 in) pressure hull
- Beam: 6.20 m (20 ft 4 in) o/a; 4.70 m (15 ft 5 in) pressure hull
- Draught: 4.74 m (15 ft 7 in)
- Installed power: 2,800–3,200 PS (2,100–2,400 kW; 2,800–3,200 bhp) (diesels); 750 PS (550 kW; 740 shp) (electric)
- Propulsion: 2 shafts; 2 × diesel engines; 2 × electric motors
- Speed: 17.7 knots (32.8 km/h; 20.4 mph) surfaced; 7.6 knots (14.1 km/h; 8.7 mph) submerged
- Range: 8,500 nmi (15,700 km; 9,800 mi) at 10 knots (19 km/h; 12 mph) surfaced; 80 nmi (150 km; 92 mi) at 4 knots (7.4 km/h; 4.6 mph) submerged
- Test depth: 230 m (750 ft); Crush depth: 250–295 m (820–968 ft)
- Complement: 4 officers, 40–56 enlisted
- Armament: 5 × 53.3 cm (21 in) torpedo tubes (4 bow, 1 stern); 14 × torpedoes; 1 × 8.8 cm (3.46 in) deck gun (220 rounds); 1 x 2 cm (0.79 in) C/30 AA gun

Service record
- Part of: 8th U-boat Flotilla; 22 October 1941 – 30 April 1942; 7th U-boat Flotilla; 1 May 1942 – 18 February 1944
- Identification codes: M 42 202
- Commanders: Oblt.z.S. / Kptlt. Horst Dietrichs; 22 October 1941 – 18 February 1944
- Operations: 8 patrols: 1st patrol: 4 – 19 April 1942; 2nd patrol: 5 May – 1 July 1942; 3rd patrol: 9 August – 8 October 1942; 4th patrol: 14 December 1942 – 12 January 1943; 5th patrol: 22 February – 30 March 1943; 6th patrol: 25 April – 11 May 1943; 7th patrol: 26 June – 15 September 1943; 8th patrol: a. 8 – 10 December 1943; b. 20 – 22 December 1943; c. 25 – 27 December 1943; d. 29 – 31 December 1943; e. 5 January – 18 February 1944
- Victories: 1 merchant ship sunk (7,452 GRT); 3 merchant ships damaged (13,285 GRT)

German submarine U-406 was a Type VIIC U-boat built for Nazi Germany's Kriegsmarine for service during World War II. She was laid down on 6 September 1940 by Danziger Werft, Danzig as yard number 107, launched on 16 June 1941 and commissioned on 22 October 1941 under Oberleutnant zur See Horst Dietrichs, the ship's only commander.

== Design ==
German Type VIIC submarines were preceded by the shorter Type VIIB submarines. U-406 had a displacement of 769 tonnes (757 long tons) when at the surface and 871 tonnes (857 long tons) while submerged. She had a total length of 67.10 m (220 ft 2 in), a pressure hull length of 50.50 m (165 ft 8 in), a beam of 6.20 m (20 ft 4 in), a height of 9.60 m (31 ft 6 in), and a draught of 4.74 m (15 ft 7 in). The submarine was powered by two Germaniawerft F46 four-stroke, six-cylinder supercharged diesel engines producing a total of 2,800 to 3,200 metric horsepower (2,060 to 2,350 kW; 2,760 to 3,160 shp) for use while surfaced, two Siemens-Schuckert GU 343/38–8 double-acting electric motors producing a total of 750 metric horsepower (550 kW; 740 shp) for use while submerged. She had two shafts and two 1.23 m (4 ft) propellers. The boat was capable of operating at depths of up to 230 metres (750 ft).

The submarine had a maximum surface speed of 17.7 knots (32.8 km/h; 20.4 mph) and a maximum submerged speed of 7.6 knots (14.1 km/h; 8.7 mph). When submerged, the boat could operate for 80 nautical miles (150 km; 92 mi) at 4 knots (7.4 km/h; 4.6 mph); when surfaced, she could travel 8,500 nautical miles (15,700 km; 9,800 mi) at 10 knots (19 km/h; 12 mph). U-406 was fitted with five 53.3 cm (21 in) torpedo tubes (four fitted at the bow and one at the stern), fourteen torpedoes, one 8.8 cm (3.46 in) SK C/35 naval gun, 220 rounds, and a 2 cm (0.79 in) C/30 anti-aircraft gun. The boat had a complement of between forty-four and sixty.

== Service history ==
The boat's career began with training at 8th U-boat Flotilla on 22 October 1941, followed by active service on 1 May 1942 as part of the 7th Flotilla for the remainder of her service.

She was attacked by a torpedo from a British Submarine on 5 May 1942, but the torpedo missed.

During the attack of Convoy ON 92 on May 11 and May 12, 1942, U-406 suffered from torpedo launch failures on two separate occasions thus failing to hit any ship.

On 5 May 1943, the boat collided with U-600, causing heavy damage to both ships and required a premature return to base in Saint Nazaire, France.

In eight patrols she sank one merchant ship, for a total of 7,452 gross register tons (GRT), and damaged three merchant ships for a total of 13,285 GRT.

=== Wolfpacks ===
U-406 took part in eleven wolfpacks:

- Hecht (8 May – 18 June 1942)
- Blücher (14 – 28 August 1942)
- Iltis (6 – 23 September 1942)
- Spitz (22 – 31 December 1942)
- Neuland (4 – 13 March 1943)
- Dränger (14 – 20 March 1943)
- Drossel (29 April – 5 May 1943)
- Rügen (14 – 26 January 1944)
- Stürmer (26 January – 3 February 1944)
- Igel 1 (3 – 17 February 1944)
- Hai 1 (17 – 18 February 1944)

=== Fate ===
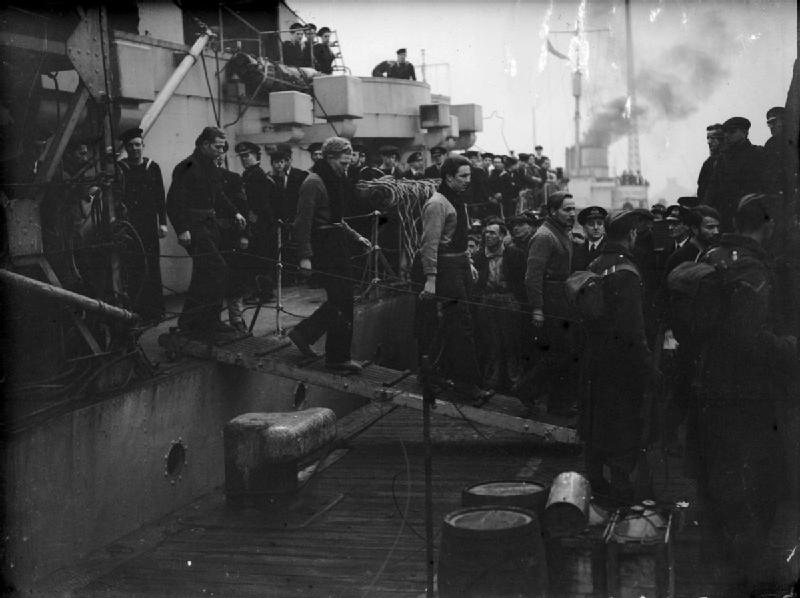
Captured survivors from U-406 and U-386 disembark the Sprey in Liverpool.

U-406 was sunk on 18 February 1944 in the North Atlantic in position 48°32′N 23°36′W, while stalking convoy ONS 29. She was detected and depth-charged by HMS Spey, surfaced and engaged with gunfire. As her crew abandoned ship, she was boarded by a party from Spey which found confidential papers and books. however the boat sank before these could be removed. Twelve of her crew were killed in the action, while 45 survived.

== Summary of raiding history ==
Date	Ship Name	Nationality	Tonnage (GRT)	Fate
19 August 1942	City of Manila	United Kingdom	7,452	Sunk
28 December 1942	Baron Cochrane	United Kingdom	3,385	Damaged
28 December 1942	Lynton Grange	United Kingdom	5,029	Damaged
28 December 1942	Zarian	United Kingdom	4,871	Damaged

== See also ==
- Convoy ON 154

== Bibliography ==
- Clay Blair (1998): Hitler's U-Boat War Vol II:The Hunted 1942-1945. Cassell ISBN 0-304-35261-6
- Busch, Rainer; Röll, Hans-Joachim (1999). German U-boat commanders of World War II : a biographical dictionary. Translated by Brooks, Geoffrey. London, Annapolis, Md: Greenhill Books, Naval Institute Press. ISBN 1-55750-186-6.
- Edwards, Bernard (1996). Dönitz and the Wolf Packs - The U-boats at War. Cassell. pp. 66, 137, 173. ISBN 0-304-35203-9.
- Gröner, Erich; Jung, Dieter; Maass, Martin (1991). U-boats and Mine Warfare Vessels. German Warships 1815–1945. Vol. 2. Translated by Thomas, Keith; Magowan, Rachel. London: Conway Maritime Press. ISBN 0-85177-593-4.
- Sharpe, Peter (1998). U-Boat Fact File. Great Britain: Midland Publishing. ISBN 1-85780-072-9.
