= HMS Penylan =

Destroyer of the Royal Navy

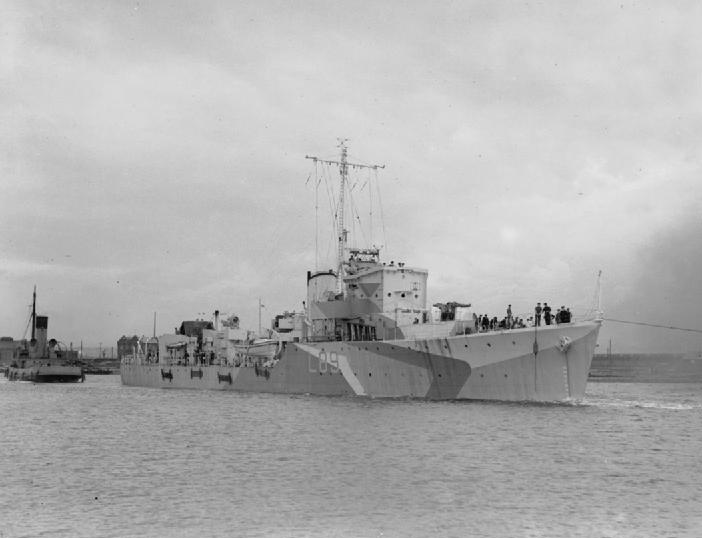

History

United Kingdom
- Name: HMS Penylan
- Ordered: 23 August 1940
- Builder: Vickers-Armstrongs, Barrow-in-Furness
- Laid down: 4 June 1941
- Launched: 17 March 1942
- Commissioned: 25 August 1942
- Honours and awards: English Channel, 1942
- Fate: Sunk on 3 December 1942
- Badge: On a Field per pale Red and Green, within a horseshoe inverted Gold and a spear head White

General characteristics
- Class & type: Hunt-class destroyer
- Displacement: 1,050 tons standard; 1,435 tons full load
- Length: 280 ft (85 m)
- Beam: 33 ft 4 in (10.16 m)
- Draught: 8 ft 3 in (2.51 m)
- Propulsion: Two x Admiralty 3 drum boilers; Two shaft Parsons geared turbines; 19,000 shp
- Speed: 27 knots (25½ knots full)
- Range: 2,350 nmi (4,350 km) at 20 knots (37 km/h)
- Complement: 168
- Armament: 4 × QF 4 in Mark XVI on twin mounts Mk. XIX; 4 × QF 2 pdr Mk. VIII on quad mount MK.VII; 2 × 20 mm Oerlikons on single mounts P Mk. III; 2 × tubes for 21 inch (533 mm) torpedoes; 110 depth charges, 4 throwers, 3 racks

HMS Penylan was a Hunt-class destroyer of the Royal Navy. She was a member of the third subgroup of the class, and saw service in the Second World War, before being sunk by German E-boats in 1942.

== Construction and commissioning ==
Penylan was ordered on 23 August 1940 under the 1940 War Emergency Programme from Vickers-Armstrongs, Barrow-in-Furness. She was laid down as Job No J3585 on 4 June 1941 and launched on 17 March 1942. She was commissioned into service on 25 August 1942, and after working up, was assigned to the 1st Destroyer Flotilla. She was adopted by the civil community of the Borough and Rural District of Carmarthen as part of Warship Week during 1942.

== Service ==
Penylan sailed to Scapa Flow in September and spent the rest of the month working up with ships of the Home Fleet, after which she sailed to Portsmouth. She had to put into a commercial shipyard in London on 22 October after a number of defects came to light. She was under repair until 9 November when she sailed to Portsmouth and joined the 1st Destroyer Flotilla on patrol in the English Channel. She was deployed on 1 December to escort Convoy PW 257. The convoy was attacked by E-boats on 3 December, and Penylan was torpedoed and sunk five miles south of Start Point by the E-boat S115. Five officers and 112 ratings were rescued. She was the shortest lived of the Hunts, spending only 30 days on active service. The wreck is designated as a protected place under the Protection of Military Remains Act 1986.

== Publications ==
- Colledge, J. J.; Warlow, Ben (2006) [1969]. Ships of the Royal Navy: The Complete Record of All Fighting Ships of the Royal Navy from the 15th Century to the Present (3rd Rev ed.). London: Chatham Publishing. ISBN 978-1-86176-281-8. OCLC 67375475.
- English, John (1987). The Hunts: a history of the design, development and careers of the 86 destroyers of this class built for the Royal and Allied Navies during World War II. England: World Ship Society. ISBN 0-905617-44-4.

== External sources ==
- HMS Penylan's wartime career
- Penylan at Uboat.net
- SI 2008/0950 Designation under the Protection of Military Remains Act 1986
