= German submarine U-211 =

German World War II submarine

History

Nazi Germany
- Name: U-211
- Ordered: 16 October 1939
- Builder: Germaniawerft, Kiel
- Yard number: 640
- Laid down: 29 March 1941
- Launched: 15 January 1942
- Commissioned: 7 March 1942
- Fate: Sunk, 19 November 1943

General characteristics
- Class & type: Type VIIC submarine
- Displacement: 769 tonnes (757 long tons) surfaced; 871 t (857 long tons) submerged
- Length: 67.10 m (220 ft 2 in) o/a; 50.50 m (165 ft 8 in) pressure hull
- Beam: 6.20 m (20 ft 4 in) o/a; 4.70 m (15 ft 5 in) pressure hull
- Height: 9.60 m (31 ft 6 in)
- Draught: 4.74 m (15 ft 7 in)
- Installed power: 2,800–3,200 PS (2,100–2,400 kW; 2,800–3,200 bhp) (diesels); 750 PS (550 kW; 740 shp) (electric)
- Propulsion: 2 shafts; 2 × diesel engines; 2 × electric motors
- Speed: 17.7 knots (32.8 km/h; 20.4 mph) surfaced; 7.6 knots (14.1 km/h; 8.7 mph) submerged
- Range: 8,500 nmi (15,700 km; 9,800 mi) at 10 knots (19 km/h; 12 mph) surfaced; 80 nmi (150 km; 92 mi) at 4 knots (7.4 km/h; 4.6 mph) submerged
- Test depth: 230 m (750 ft); Crush depth: 250–295 m (820–968 ft)
- Complement: 4 officers, 40–56 enlisted
- Armament: 5 × 53.3 cm (21 in) torpedo tubes (four bow, one stern); 14 × G7e torpedoes or 26 TMA mines; 1 × 8.8 cm (3.46 in) deck gun (220 rounds); 1 x 2 cm (0.79 in) C/30 AA gun

Service record
- Part of: 5th U-boat Flotilla; 7 March – 31 August 1942; 9th U-boat Flotilla; 1 September – 19 November 1943
- Identification codes: M 44 194
- Commanders: Oblt.z.S. / Kptlt. / K.Kapt. Karl Hause; 7 March 1942 – 19 November 1943
- Operations: 5 patrols: 1st patrol: 26 August – 7 October 1942; 2nd patrol: 11 November – 29 December 1942; 3rd patrol: 13 – 25 February 1943; 4th patrol: a. 10 May – 16 July 1943; b. 23 – 24 September 1943; 5th patrol: 11 October – 19 November 1943
- Victories: 1 warship sunk (1,350 tons); 3 merchant ships damaged (31,883 GRT)

German submarine U-211 was a Type VIIC U-boat of the Kriegsmarine during World War II. The submarine was laid down on 29 March 1941 by the Friedrich Krupp Germaniawerft yard at Kiel as yard number 640, launched on 15 January 1942 and commissioned on 7 March under the command of Korvettenkapitän Karl Hause.

A member of eight wolfpacks, she sank one warship of 1,350 tons and damaged three commercial vessels totalling 31,883 gross register tons (GRT) in five patrols.

She was sunk on 19 November 1943 by a British aircraft in the North Atlantic. 54 men died; there were no survivors.

== Design ==
German Type VIIC submarines were preceded by the shorter Type VIIB submarines. U-211 had a displacement of 769 tonnes (757 long tons) when at the surface and 871 tonnes (857 long tons) while submerged. She had a total length of 67.10 m (220 ft 2 in), a pressure hull length of 50.50 m (165 ft 8 in), a beam of 6.20 m (20 ft 4 in), a height of 9.60 m (31 ft 6 in), and a draught of 4.74 m (15 ft 7 in). The submarine was powered by two Germaniawerft F46 four-stroke, six-cylinder supercharged diesel engines producing a total of 2,800 to 3,200 metric horsepower (2,060 to 2,350 kW; 2,760 to 3,160 shp) for use while surfaced, two AEG GU 460/8–27 double-acting electric motors producing a total of 750 metric horsepower (550 kW; 740 shp) for use while submerged. She had two shafts and two 1.23 m (4 ft) propellers. The boat was capable of operating at depths of up to 230 metres (750 ft).

The submarine had a maximum surface speed of 17.7 knots (32.8 km/h; 20.4 mph) and a maximum submerged speed of 7.6 knots (14.1 km/h; 8.7 mph). When submerged, the boat could operate for 80 nautical miles (150 km; 92 mi) at 4 knots (7.4 km/h; 4.6 mph); when surfaced, she could travel 8,500 nautical miles (15,700 km; 9,800 mi) at 10 knots (19 km/h; 12 mph). U-211 was fitted with five 53.3 cm (21 in) torpedo tubes (four fitted at the bow and one at the stern), fourteen torpedoes, one 8.8 cm (3.46 in) SK C/35 naval gun, 220 rounds, and a 2 cm (0.79 in) C/30 anti-aircraft gun. The boat had a complement of between forty-four and sixty.

== Service history ==
=== First patrol ===
Having moved to Bergen via Arendal in Norway in August 1942, U-211's first patrol began from the larger Nordic port on 26 August. Her route took her through the gap between Iceland and the Faroe Islands and into the Atlantic Ocean.

On 12 September, she damaged Empire Moonbeam southwest of Cape Clear, (southern Ireland) with one torpedo and Hektoria with two. Her next victim was Esso Williamsburg which was damaged on the 23rd about 500 nmi (930 km; 580 mi) south of Cape Farewell (Greenland). This ship had already been unsuccessfully attacked the previous day. She was eventually sunk by U-254 on 3 October. There were no survivors.

U-211 arrived at Brest in occupied France on 7 October 1942.

=== Second patrol ===
The boat left Brest for her second foray on 11 November 1942. On 17 December, as part of Wolfpack Raufbold she sank a British destroyer, HMS Firedrake (H79), which at the time was on escort duty protecting Convoy ON 153, in mid-Atlantic. The ship broke into two pieces on being hit. The bow sank immediately, but the stern remained afloat for some hours. There were 26 survivors out of a ships' company of 196.

The submarine returned to Brest on 29 December.

=== Third patrol ===
All was well on the boat's third sortie until 20 February 1943 when she was attacked by a US B-24 Liberator west of the Bay of Biscay. The aircraft dropped six depth charges, causing enough damage to bring the patrol to a premature end.

=== Fourth patrol ===
This time it was the turn of the Royal Air Force. While still outbound, an Armstrong Whitworth Whitley of No. 10 Squadron dropped three depth charges north of Finisterre in Spain on 15 May 1943 - the damage was not so great. Having left Brest on the tenth, U-211 returned on 16 July.

=== Fifth patrol and loss ===
U-211 moved from Brest to Lorient in September 1943. On 11 October, she began what would turn out to be her final outing. After a lot of to-ing and fro-ing west of Portugal, she was sunk by depth charges from a British Vickers Wellington of 179 Squadron east of the Azores.

54 men died; there were no survivors.

=== Wolfpacks ===
U-211 took part in eight wolfpacks, namely:

- Vorwärts (3 – 26 September 1942)
- Panzer (27 November – 11 December 1942)
- Raufbold (11 – 21 December 1942)
- Trutz (1 – 16 June 1943)
- Trutz 3 (16 – 29 June 1943)
- Geier 2 (30 June – 10 July 1943)
- Schill (25 October – 16 November 1943)
- Schill 1 (16 – 19 November 1943)

== Summary of raiding history ==
Date	Name	Nationality	Tonnage (Note: Merchant ship tonnages are in gross register tons. Military vessels are listed by tons displacement.)	Fate
12 September 1942	Empire Moonbeam	United Kingdom	6,849	Damaged
12 September 1942	Hektoria	United Kingdom	13,797	Damaged
23 September 1942	Esso Williamsburg	United States	11,237	Damaged
17 December 1942	HMS Firedrake	Royal Navy	1,350	Sunk

== Bibliography ==
- Busch, Rainer; Röll, Hans-Joachim (1999). German U-boat commanders of World War II : a biographical dictionary. Translated by Brooks, Geoffrey. London, Annapolis, Md: Greenhill Books, Naval Institute Press. ISBN 1-55750-186-6.
- Busch, Rainer; Röll, Hans-Joachim (1999). Deutsche U-Boot-Verluste von September 1939 bis Mai 1945 [German U-boat losses from September 1939 to May 1945]. Der U-Boot-Krieg (in German). Vol. IV. Hamburg, Berlin, Bonn: Mittler. ISBN 3-8132-0514-2.
- Edwards, Bernard (1996). Dönitz and the Wolf Packs - The U-boats at War. Cassell Military Classics. pp. 105, 108. ISBN 0-304-35203-9.
- Gröner, Erich; Jung, Dieter; Maass, Martin (1991). U-boats and Mine Warfare Vessels. German Warships 1815–1945. Vol. 2. Translated by Thomas, Keith; Magowan, Rachel. London: Conway Maritime Press. ISBN 0-85177-593-4.
