= HMCS Battleford =

Flower-class corvette

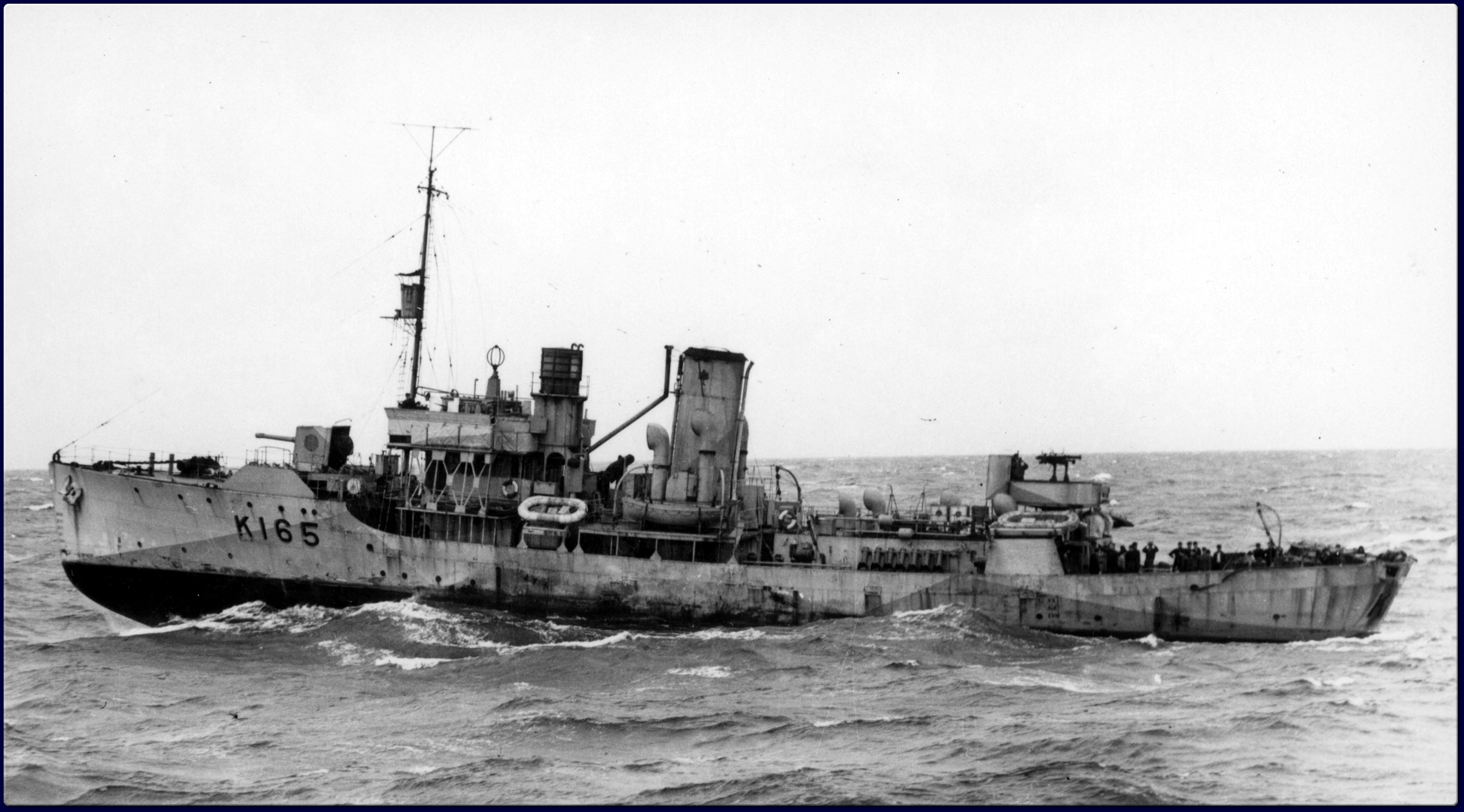
- HMCS Battleford off the East Coast of the United States, 5 October 1943.

History

Canada
- Name: Battleford
- Namesake: Battleford, Saskatchewan
- Ordered: 1 February 1940
- Builder: Collingwood Shipyards, Collingwood
- Laid down: 30 September 1940
- Launched: 15 April 1941
- Commissioned: 31 July 1941
- Decommissioned: 18 July 1945
- Identification: Pennant number: K165
- Honours and awards: Atlantic 1941–1945
- Fate: Sold to Venezuelan Navy

Venezuela
- Name: Libertad
- Acquired: purchased from Royal Canadian Navy
- Commissioned: 1946
- Out of service: 12 April 1949
- Fate: Wrecked 12 April 1949

General characteristics
- Class & type: Flower-class corvette (original)
- Displacement: 950 long tons (970 t)
- Length: 205 ft 1 in (62.51 m) o/a
- Beam: 33 ft 1 in (10.08 m)
- Draught: 13 ft 5 in (4.09 m)
- Propulsion: single shaft; 2 × Scotch boilers; 1 × 4-cylinder triple-expansion reciprocating steam engine; 2,750 ihp (2,050 kW)
- Speed: 16 knots (30 km/h; 18 mph)
- Range: 3,450 nmi (6,390 km; 3,970 mi) at 12 kn (22 km/h; 14 mph)
- Complement: 47
- Sensors & processing systems: 1 × SW1C or 2C radar; 1 × Type 123A or Type 127DV sonar
- Armament: 1 × BL 4-inch (101.6 mm) Mk.IX single gun; 2 × .50 cal machine gun (twin); 2 × Lewis .303 cal machine gun (twin); 2 × Mk.II depth charge throwers; 2 × depth charge rails with 40 depth charges; originally fitted with minesweeping gear, later removed

HMCS Battleford was a Flower-class corvette of the Royal Canadian Navy launched on 15 April 1940 and commissioned on 31 July 1941 during the Second World War. The corvette served primarily in the Battle of the Atlantic, escorting convoys of merchant ships. After the war she was sold to the Venezuelan Navy and renamed Libertad. Libertad was wrecked on 12 April 1949.

== Design and description ==
Flower-class corvettes like Battleford serving with the Royal Canadian Navy during the Second World War were different from earlier and more traditional sail-driven corvettes. The Flower-class corvettes originated from a need that arose in 1938 to expand the Royal Navy following the Munich Crisis. A design request went out for a small escort for coastal convoys. Based on a traditional whaler-type design, the initial Canadian ships of the Flower class had a standard displacement of 950 long tons (970 t). They were 205 feet 1 inch (62.51 m) long overall with a beam of 33 feet 1 inch (10.08 m) and a maximum draught of 13 feet 5 inches (4.09 m). The initial 1939–1940 corvettes were powered by a four-cylinder vertical triple expansion engine powered by steam from two Scotch boilers turning one three-bladed propeller rated at 2,800 indicated horsepower (2,100 kW). The Scotch boilers were replaced with water-tube boilers in later 1939–1940 and 1940–1941 Programme ships. The corvettes had a maximum speed of 16 knots (30 km/h; 18 mph). This gave them a range of 3,450 nautical miles (6,390 km; 3,970 mi) at 12 knots (22 km/h; 14 mph). The vessels were extremely wet.

The Canadian Flower-class vessels were initially armed with a Mk IX BL 4-inch (102 mm) gun forward on a CP 1 mounting and carried 100 rounds per gun. The corvettes were also armed with a QF Vickers 2-pounder (40 mm, 1.6 in) gun on a bandstand aft, two single-mounted .303 Vickers machine guns or Browning 0.5-calibre machine guns for anti-aircraft defence and two twin-mounted .303 Lewis machine guns, usually sited on bridge wings. For anti-submarine warfare, they mounted two depth charge throwers and initially carried 25 depth charges. The corvettes were designed with a Type 123 ASDIC sonar set installed. The Flower-class ships had a complement of 47 officers and ratings. The Royal Canadian Navy initially ordered 54 corvettes in 1940 and these were fitted with Mark II Oropesa minesweeping gear used for destroying contact mines. Part of the depth charge rails were made portable so the minesweeping gear could be utilised.

=== Modifications ===
In Canadian service the vessels were altered due to experience with the design's deficiencies. The galley was moved further back in the ship and the mess and sleeping quarters combined. A direction-finding set was installed and enlarged bilge keels were installed to reduce rolling. After the first 35–40 corvettes had been constructed, the foremast was shifted aft of the bridge and the mainmast was eliminated. Corvettes were first fitted with basic SW-1 and SW-2 CQ surface warning radar, notable for their fishbone-like antenna and reputation for failure in poor weather or in the dark. The compass house was moved further aft and the open-type bridge was situated in front of it. The ASDIC hut was moved in front and to a lower position on the bridge. The improved Type 271 radar was placed aft, with some units receiving Type 291 radar for air search. The minesweeping gear, a feature of the first 54 corvettes, was removed. Most Canadian Flower-class corvettes had their forecastles extended which improved crew accommodation and seakeeping. Furthermore, the sheer and flare of the bow was increased, which led to an enlarged bridge. This allowed for the installation of Oerlikon 20 mm (0.8 in) cannon, replacing the Browning and Vickers machine guns. Some of the corvettes were rearmed with Hedgehog anti-submarine mortars. The complements of the ships grew throughout the war rising from the initial 47 to as many as 104.

== Construction and career ==
The vessel was ordered as part of the 1939–1940 Programme in January 1940, from Collingwood Shipyards at Collingwood, Ontario. She was laid down on 30 September 1940, launched on 15 April 1941 at Collingwood, named for the town in Saskatchewan. The corvette was commissioned on 31 July 1941 at Montreal, Quebec.

Battleford escorted trade convoys between Halifax Harbour and the Western Approaches through the Battle of the Atlantic. After commissioning she was briefly part of Sydney Force before transferring to the Newfoundland Escort Force (NEF). From 23 November to 28 December 1941 Battleford was a part of the task unit (TU) 4.1.11 of the NEF. On 28 November, Battleford joined the escort of convoy SC 57. Upon the vessel's return to Canada while escorting ONS 46, Battleford began her first refit on 7 January 1942. While Battleford was refitting, the escort groups were re-organised under United States' command and Battleford was reassigned to TU 4.1.12. Battleford returned to active service in March and sailed east with a convoy in May. After departing the convoy, Battleford underwent repairs at Cardiff, Wales and then the ship and her crew underwent training at the British escort training centre in Tobermory. After training, the corvette was assigned to the Mid-Ocean Escort Force (MOEF) escort group C1 in July 1942. On 13 September 1942, convoy SC 99, escorted by C1, was spotted by a German U-boat and the convoy was attacked. However, the U-boats were driven off by C1 and one of the German submarines was severely damaged in the battle. With group C1, she shared credit for sinking the German submarine U-356 during the battle for convoy ON 154, which was attacked by two U-boat wolfpacks on 27 December. Fifteen merchants ships were sunk in the battle, which ended on 31 December. In January 1943, the escort groups were re-organized, but Battleford remained with C1. In 1943, Battleford took part in three more convoy battles, engaging with U-boats. C1 lost one merchant ship during the battle for convoy HX 222 in January and in late February–early March, convoy KMS 10 lost one ship and another damaged in an engagement with U-boats. Again in April, convoy ONS 2 was attacked with the loss of three ships before the escort could drive off the submarines.

After leaving group C1 which she had been a part of up to May 1943, Battleford underwent another refit, this time at Liverpool, Nova Scotia. Battleford escorted North American coastal convoys with the Western Local Escort Force for the last two years of the war as part of escort group W-3. However, for a brief period, Battleford was among the Canadian vessels ordered to England in preparation for Operation Overlord and the corvette took part in the invasion of Normandy on 6 June 1944.

=== Trans-Atlantic convoys escorted ===
Convoy	Escort Group	Dates	Notes
SC 57		28 November–9 December 1941	Newfoundland to Iceland; 3 ships torpedoed and sunk
ON 48		24–31 December 1941	49 ships escorted without loss from Iceland to Newfoundland
SC 80		22 April–3 May 1942	29 ships escorted without loss from Newfoundland to Northern Ireland
ON 112	MOEF group C1	14–25 July 1942	36 ships escorted without loss from Northern Ireland to Newfoundland
SC 94	MOEF group C1	2–12 August 1942	Newfoundland to Northern Ireland; 10 ships torpedoed and sunk
ON 123	MOEF group C1	22–31 August 1942	39 ships escorted without loss from Northern Ireland to Newfoundland
SC 99	MOEF group C1	9–19 September 1942	59 ships escorted without loss from Newfoundland to Northern Ireland
ON 133	MOEF group C1	26 September–5 October 1942	35 ships escorted without loss from Northern Ireland to Newfoundland
HX 211	MOEF group C1	13–20 October 1942	29 ships escorted without loss from Newfoundland to Northern Ireland
ON 143	MOEF group C1	2–11 November 1942	26 ships escorted without loss from Northern Ireland to Newfoundland
SC 110	MOEF group C1	24 November–5 December 1942	33 ships escorted without loss from Halifax to Newfoundland
ON 154	MOEF group C1	19–30 December 1942	Northern Ireland to Newfoundland; 14 ships torpedoed (13 sunk)
HX 222	MOEF group C1	11–22 January 1943	Newfoundland to Northern Ireland; 1 ship torpedoed and sunk
KMS 10G	MOEF group C1	28 February–8 March 1943	Liverpool to Mediterranean Sea; 4 ships torpedoed (1 sunk)
MKS 9	MOEF group C1	8–18 March 1943	55 ships escorted without loss from Mediterranean to Liverpool
ONS 2	MOEF group C1	29 March–14 April 1943	31 ships escorted without loss from Northern Ireland to Newfoundland

=== Post war service ===
Battleford was paid off at Sorel, Quebec on 18 July 1945. For her participation in the Battle of the Atlantic, Battleford earned the battle honour "Atlantic 1939–45". After the war she was one of seven corvettes of the RCN that were sold to the Venezuelan Navy. In 1946 Battleford was renamed Libertad. Libertad was lost on 12 April 1949.
