= HMS Cygnet (H83) =

British C-class destroyer

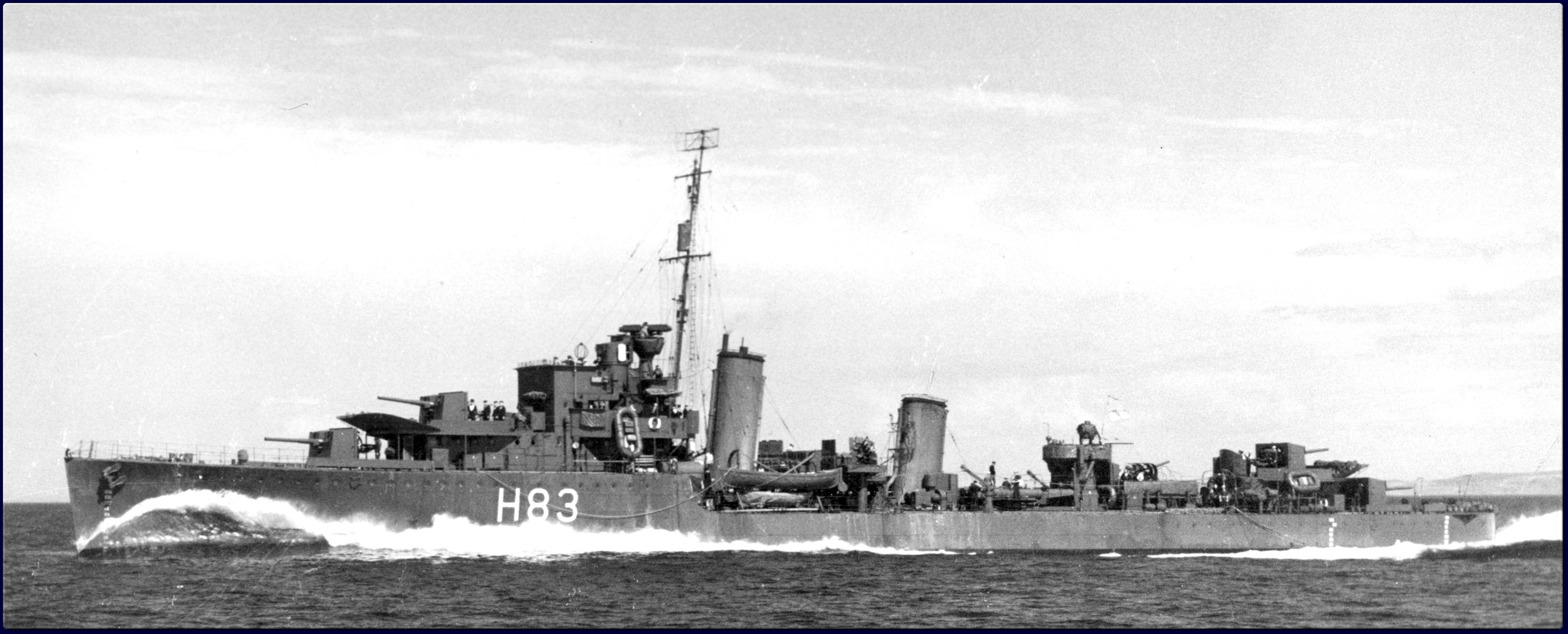
- St Laurent, 20 August 1941

History

United Kingdom
- Name: Cygnet
- Namesake: Cygnet
- Ordered: 9 July 1930
- Builder: Vickers-Armstrongs, Barrow
- Yard number: 667
- Laid down: 1 December 1930
- Launched: 29 September 1931
- Completed: 1 April 1932
- Decommissioned: 30 September 1936
- Identification: Pennant number: H83
- Fate: Sold to the Royal Canadian Navy, 1 February 1937

Canada
- Name: St. Laurent
- Namesake: St. Lawrence River
- Acquired: 1 February 1937
- Commissioned: 17 February 1937
- Decommissioned: 10 October 1945
- Identification: Pennant number: H83
- Honours and awards: Atlantic 1939-45; Normandy 1944
- Fate: Scrapped in 1947

General characteristics
- Class & type: C-class destroyer
- Displacement: 1,375 long tons (1,397 t) (standard); 1,865 long tons (1,895 t) (deep)
- Length: 329 ft (100.3 m) o/a
- Beam: 33 ft (10.1 m)
- Draught: 12 ft 6 in (3.8 m)
- Installed power: 36,000 shp (27,000 kW)
- Propulsion: 2 × shafts; 2 × Parsons geared steam turbines; 3 × Admiralty 3-drum boilers
- Speed: 36 knots (67 km/h; 41 mph)
- Range: 5,500 nmi (10,200 km; 6,300 mi) at 15 knots (28 km/h; 17 mph)
- Complement: 145
- Armament: 4 × 1 - QF 4.7-inch Mk IX guns; 1 × 1 - QF 3-inch 20 cwt anti-aircraft gun; 2 × 1 - QF 2-pounder Mk II AA guns; 2 × 4 - 21 inch (533 mm) torpedo tubes; 6 × depth charges, 3 chutes

HMS Cygnet was a C-class destroyer built for the Royal Navy in the early 1930s. The ship was initially assigned to the Home Fleet, although she was temporarily deployed in the Red Sea during the Abyssinia Crisis of 1935–36. Cygnet was sold to the Royal Canadian Navy (RCN) in late 1937 and renamed HMCS St. Laurent. She was stationed on the west coast of Canada when World War II began in September 1939, and had to be transferred to the Atlantic coast for convoy escort duties. She served as a convoy escort in the Battle of the Atlantic and participated in the sinking of two German submarines. The ship was on anti-submarine patrols during the invasion of Normandy, and was employed as a troop transport after VE Day for returning Canadian servicemen. St. Laurent was decommissioned in late 1945 and scrapped in 1947.

== Design and construction ==
Cygnet displaced 1,375 long tons (1,397 t) at standard load and 1,865 long tons (1,895 t) at deep load. The ship had an overall length of 329 feet (100.3 m), a beam of 33 feet (10.1 m) and a draught of 12 feet 6 inches (3.8 m). She was powered by Parsons geared steam turbines, driving two shafts, which developed a total of 36,000 shaft horsepower (27,000 kW) and gave a maximum speed of 36 knots (67 km/h; 41 mph). Steam for the turbines was provided by three Admiralty 3-drum water-tube boilers. Cygnet carried a maximum of 473 long tons (481 t) of fuel oil that gave her a range of 5,500 nautical miles (10,200 km; 6,300 mi) at 15 knots (28 km/h; 17 mph). The ship's complement was 145 officers and men.

The ship mounted four 45-calibre 4.7-inch Mk IX guns in single mounts, designated 'A', 'B', 'X', and 'Y' from front to rear. For anti-aircraft (AA) defence, Cygnet had a single QF 3-inch 20 cwt (Note: "cwt" is the abbreviation for hundredweight, 30 cwt referring to the weight of the gun.) AA gun between her funnels, and two 40-millimetre (1.6 in) QF 2-pounder Mk II AA guns mounted on the aft end of her forecastle deck. The 3-inch (76 mm) AA gun was removed in 1936 and the 2-pounders were relocated to between the funnels. She was fitted with two above-water quadruple torpedo tube mounts for 21-inch torpedoes. Three depth-charge chutes were fitted, each with a capacity of two depth charges. After World War II began this was increased to 33 depth charges, delivered by one or two rails and two throwers.

The ship was ordered on 15 July 1930 from Vickers-Armstrongs, Barrow-in-Furness under the 1929 Programme. Cygnet was laid down on 1 December 1930, launched on 29 September 1931, as the 14th ship to carry the name, and completed on 1 April 1932.

== Service history ==
After the ship commissioned on 9 April 1932, she was assigned to the 2nd Destroyer Flotilla of the Home Fleet. Cygnet spent a lot of time in dockyard hands during her first two years of service. She was repaired at Devonport in November 1932 – January 1933, March–May, July–August and November 1933 – January 1934 before deploying to the West Indies with the Home Fleet between January and March 1934. The ship required more repairs upon her return in April–May and then a refit from 25 July to 31 August 1934. Cygnet was detached from the Home Fleet during the Abyssinian Crisis, and deployed in the Red Sea from September 1935 to April 1936. The ship returned to the UK in April 1936 and refitted at Devonport between 20 April and 18 June before resuming duty with the Home Fleet. In July–August she was deployed for patrol duties off the Spanish coast in the Bay of Biscay to intercept shipping carrying contraband goods to Spain and to protect British-flagged shipping during the first stages of the Spanish Civil War.

=== Transfer to the Royal Canadian Navy ===
Together with her sister HMS Crescent, Cygnet was sold to Canada on 20 October 1936 for a total price of £400,000. She was refitted again to meet Canadian standards, including the installation of Type 124 ASDIC, and handed over on 1 February 1937. The ship was renamed as HMCS St. Laurent and commissioned into the RCN on 17 February. St. Laurent was assigned to Halifax, Nova Scotia and arrived there in May. She remained there for a year before she was transferred to Esquimalt in 1938. The ship remained there until she was ordered to the East Coast on 31 August 1939, arriving at Halifax on 18 September. St. Laurent escorted local convoys while based there, including the convoy carrying half of the 1st Canadian Infantry Division to the UK on 10 December. The ship was ordered to Plymouth on 24 May 1940 and arrived there on 31 May. Upon arrival, the ship's rear torpedo tube mount was removed and replaced by a 12-pounder AA gun and the 2-pounders were exchanged for quadruple Mark I mounts for the QF 0.5-inch Vickers Mark III machine gun.

On 9 June, St. Laurent was ordered to Le Havre, France to evacuate British troops, but none were to be found and the ship evacuated a small group of French soldiers further up the coast on 11 June. The ship was taken under fire by a German artillery battery near Saint-Valery-en-Caux, but she was not hit and Lieutenant Commander H.G. DeWolf, the ship's captain, ordered her to return fire although no results were noted. After returning to England, St. Laurent escorted several troop convoys on the last legs of their journeys from Canada, Australia and New Zealand in mid-June and was assigned to escort duties with Western Approaches Command afterwards.

On 2 July, whilst escorting the British battleship Nelson, St. Laurent received word that the unescorted British passenger ship SS Arandora Star had been torpedoed by U-47, about 125 nautical miles (232 km; 144 mi) northeast of Malin Head, Ireland. Arriving some four and a half hours after the ocean liner sank, the ship rescued 857 survivors, including German and Italian prisoners of war. Together with the British sloop Sandwich, she badly damaged the German submarine U-52 whilst defending Convoy HX 60 on 4 August. On 2 December, St. Laurent rescued survivors from the armed merchant cruiser HMS Forfar that had been torpedoed and sunk by U-99 as well survivors from the British oil tanker Conch.

After refitting at Halifax from 3 March to 11 July 1941, St. Laurent was assigned to the 14th Escort Group of the RCN's Newfoundland Escort Force which covered convoys in the Mid-Atlantic. Whilst escorting Convoy ON 33 in November in a gale, the ship was damaged severely enough by the weather that she was forced to return to Halifax for repairs. St. Laurent was transferred to the Mid-Ocean Escort Force in December and remained until March 1943. She was given a lengthy refit at Halifax in April–August 1942. In early December 1942, the ship's director-control tower and rangefinder were exchanged for a Type 271 target indication radar mounted above the bridge. By this time, she had been fitted with a high-frequency direction finding system as well. Whilst assigned to Escort Group C1 defending Convoy ON 154 in late December 1942, St. Laurent had her first victory; In the early hours of 27 December 1942, while north of the Azores, she sighted a U-boat on the surface which she engaged with gunfire, followed by a depth charge attack as the boat crash-dived. As she attacked again she found oil on the surface, but no other evidence of destruction. However, in the post-war examination she was credited with sinking U-356.

The ship was refitted in Dartmouth, Nova Scotia, between 17 August and December 1943. On 10 March 1944, St. Laurent was credited with sinking U-845 in the North Atlantic, along with the destroyer HMS Forester, and frigates HMCS Owen Sound and HMCS Swansea.

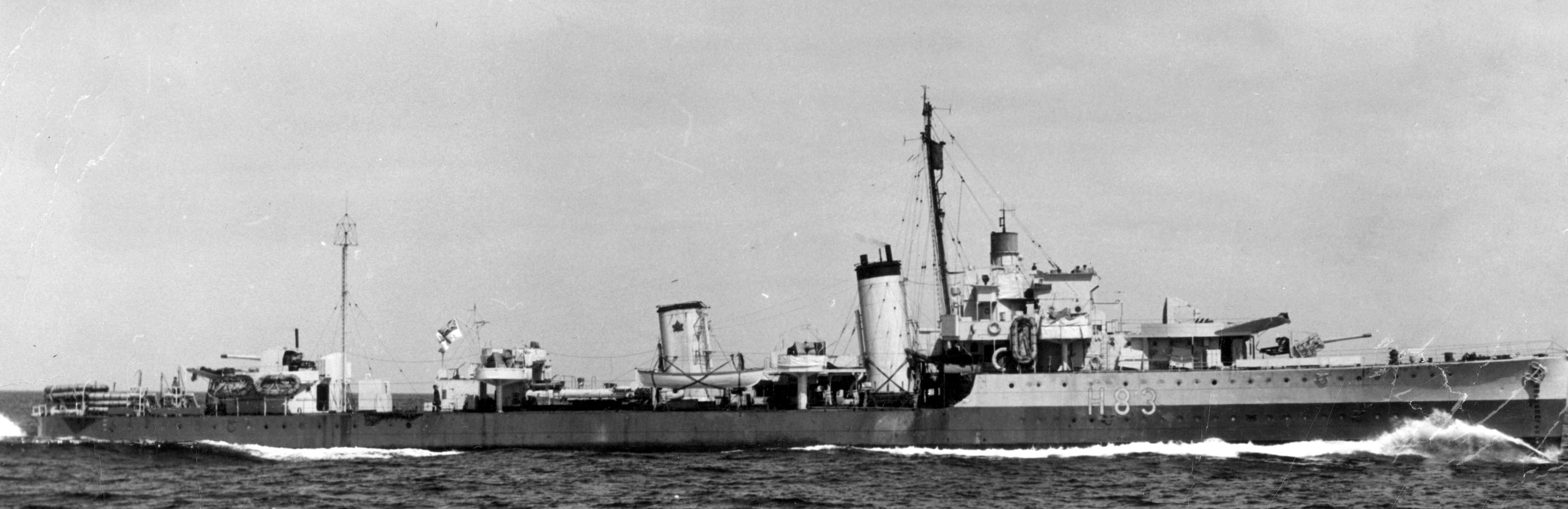
Late-war photo of St. Laurent

The other changes made to the ship's armament during the war (exactly when these occurred is unknown) included the replacement of 'B' gun by a Hedgehog anti-submarine spigot mortar, exchanging the two quadruple .50-calibre Vickers machine guns mounted between her funnels for two Oerlikon 20 mm AA guns, the addition of two Oerlikon guns to her searchlight platform and another pair were fitted on the wings of her bridge, and the removal of her 12-pounder AA gun. Type 286 short-range surface search radar was also added. 'Y' gun was also removed to allow her depth charge stowage to be increased to at least 60 depth charges.

In May 1944 she was transferred to the 11th Escort Group to support the Allied landings in Normandy. On D-Day itself – 6 June 1944 – she was deployed with the Canadian destroyers Chaudière, Gatineau, Kootenay and Ottawa stationed in the entrance to the English Channel to prevent U-boat attacks on the invasion convoys. Later she was deployed with her group in the Bay of Biscay for anti-submarine operations. On 8 August she was unsuccessfully attacked by a glide bomb, and on the 13th she and Ottawa rescued survivors from U-270 which had been sunk with depth charges by a Sunderland aircraft. These duties continued into October, when she returned to Canada to refit. Conducted at Shelburne, Nova Scotia, the refit lasted from November 1944 to 20 March 1945. St. Laurent returned to service in April 1945, and was attached to the Halifax Escort Force for convoy defence off the east coast. After the German surrender on 6 May, she was employed as a troop transport, until paid off on 10 October 1945. The ship was sold for scrap and broken up in 1947.

=== Trans-Atlantic convoys escorted ===
Convoy	Escort Group	Dates	Notes
HX 138		15–23 July 1941	Newfoundland to Iceland
SC 45		22-29 Sept 1941	Newfoundland to Iceland
ON 21		5-14 Oct 1941	Iceland to Newfoundland
SC 51		2-4 Nov 1941	Newfoundland to Iceland
ON 33		10-13 Nov 1941	Iceland to Newfoundland
SC 58		6-15 Dec 1941	Newfoundland to Iceland
ON 48		26-late Dec 1941	Northern Ireland to Newfoundland
HX 170		13-16 Jan 1942	Newfoundland to Northern Ireland
SC 65		20-29 Jan 1942	Newfoundland to Northern Ireland
ON 62		6-15 Feb 1942	Northern Ireland to Newfoundland
SC 72		7–16 March 1942	Newfoundland to Northern Ireland
ON 81		30 March-9 April 1942	Northern Ireland to Newfoundland
ON 119	MOEF group C2	15-20 Aug 1942	Iceland to Newfoundland
ON 121	MOEF group C3	20-22 Aug 1942	Iceland to Newfoundland
ON 126	MOEF group B3	30 Aug-13 Sept 1942	Northern Ireland to Newfoundland
ON 133	MOEF group C1	26 Sept-6 Oct 1942	Northern Ireland to Newfoundland
ON 143	MOEF group C1	9-13 Nov 1942	Northern Ireland to Newfoundland
SC 110	MOEF group C1	24 Nov-6 Dec 1942	Newfoundland to Northern Ireland
Convoy ON 154	MOEF group C1	19-31 Dec 1942	Northern Ireland to Newfoundland
HX 227	MOEF group B6	24 Feb-5 March 1943	Newfoundland to Northern Ireland
ONS 2	MOEF group C1	5–14 April 1943	Northern Ireland to Newfoundland
SC 127	MOEF group C1	20 April-2 May 1943	Newfoundland to Northern Ireland
ON 184	MOEF group C1	16–25 May 1943	Northern Ireland to Newfoundland
HX 242		6–14 June 1943	Newfoundland to Northern Ireland
ON 190		25 June-3 July 1943	Northern Ireland to Newfoundland
HX 247		14–21 July 1943	Newfoundland to Northern Ireland
ON 195		3-8 Aug 1943	Northern Ireland to Newfoundland
HX 276		27 Jan-6 Feb 1944	Newfoundland to Northern Ireland
ON 224		15-26 Feb 1944	Northern Ireland to Newfoundland
SC 154		2–15 March 1944	Newfoundland to Northern Ireland
ONS 32		29 March-13 April 1944	Northern Ireland to Newfoundland
HX 287		22–25 April 1944	Newfoundland to Northern Ireland
ON 267		19-24 Nov 1944	Northern Ireland to Newfoundland

=== Successes ===
During her service St. Laurent was credited with the destruction of one U-boat:

Date	U-boat	Type	Location	Notes
27 December 1942	U-356	VIIC	Atlantic, NW of Cape Finisterre; 45°30′N 25°40′W	Gunfire and depth charge attacks by St. Laurent

A model of HMS Cygnet by Norman A. Ough is held by the National Maritime Museum.
