= German submarine U-441 =

German world war II submarine

History

Nazi Germany
- Name: U-441
- Ordered: 5 January 1940
- Builder: Schichau-Werke, Danzig
- Yard number: 1492
- Laid down: 15 October 1940
- Launched: 13 December 1941
- Commissioned: 21 February 1942
- Fate: Sunk on 30 June 1944

General characteristics
- Class & type: Type VIIC submarine
- Displacement: 769 tonnes (757 long tons) surfaced; 871 t (857 long tons) submerged
- Length: 67.10 m (220 ft 2 in) o/a; 50.50 m (165 ft 8 in) pressure hull
- Beam: 6.20 m (20 ft 4 in) o/a; 4.70 m (15 ft 5 in) pressure hull
- Height: 9.60 m (31 ft 6 in)
- Draught: 4.74 m (15 ft 7 in)
- Installed power: 2,800–3,200 PS (2,100–2,400 kW; 2,800–3,200 bhp) (diesels); 750 PS (550 kW; 740 shp) (electric)
- Propulsion: 2 shafts; 2 × diesel engines; 2 × electric motors
- Speed: 17.7 knots (32.8 km/h; 20.4 mph) surfaced; 7.6 knots (14.1 km/h; 8.7 mph) submerged
- Range: 8,500 nmi (15,700 km; 9,800 mi) at 10 knots (19 km/h; 12 mph) surfaced; 80 nmi (150 km; 92 mi) at 4 knots (7.4 km/h; 4.6 mph) submerged
- Test depth: 230 m (750 ft); Crush depth: 250–295 m (820–968 ft)
- Complement: As U-441 : 4 officers, 40–56 enlisted; As U-flak 1 : 67 officers and ratings
- Armament: As U-441; 5 × 53.3 cm (21 in) torpedo tubes (four bow, one stern); 14 × torpedoes; 1 × 8.8 cm (3.46 in) deck gun (220 rounds); various AA guns; As U-Flak 1; 2 × quad 2 cm (0.79 in) Flakvierling 38; 1 × 3.7 cm (1.5 in) Flak M42; additional MG 42 machine guns

Service record
- Part of: 5th U-boat Flotilla; 21 February – 30 September 1942; 1st U-boat Flotilla; 1 October 1942 – 30 June 1944
- Identification codes: M 25 534
- Commanders: Kptlt. Klaus Hartmann; 21 February 1942 – 15 May 1943; Kptlt. Götz von Hartmann; 16 May 1943 – 5 August 1943; Kptlt. Klaus Hartmann; 6 August 1943 – 30 June 1944
- Operations: 9 patrols: 1st patrol: a. 17 – 27 September 1942; b. 1 October – 7 November 1942; 2nd patrol: a. 7 – 11 December 1942; b. 13 December 1942 – 22 January 1943; 3rd patrol: 27 February – 11 April 1943; 4th patrol: 22 – 25 May 1943; 5th patrol: 8 – 13 July 1943; 6th patrol: 17 October – 8 November 1943; 7th patrol: a. 18 January – 14 March 1944; b. 1 – 3 May 1944; 8th patrol: 20 – 27 May 1944; 9th patrol: 6 – 30 June 1944
- Victories: 1 merchant ship sunk (7,051 GRT)

German submarine U-441 was a Type VIIC U-boat of Nazi Germany's Kriegsmarine during World War II, which served for a short time as an anti-aircraft submarine under the designation U-flak 1.

The submarine was laid down on 15 October 1940 at the Schichau-Werke in Danzig as yard number 1492, launched on 13 December 1941 and commissioned on 21 February 1942, under the command of Kapitänleutnant Klaus Hartmann.

U-441 first served with the 5th U-boat Flotilla, a training unit, and then operationally with the 1st flotilla from 1 October 1942. She was lost on 30 June 1944.

== Design ==
German Type VIIC submarines were preceded by the shorter Type VIIB submarines. U-441 had a displacement of 769 tonnes (757 long tons) when at the surface and 871 tonnes (857 long tons) while submerged. She had a total length of 67.10 m (220 ft 2 in), a pressure hull length of 50.50 m (165 ft 8 in), a beam of 6.20 m (20 ft 4 in), a height of 9.60 m (31 ft 6 in), and a draught of 4.74 m (15 ft 7 in). The submarine was powered by two Germaniawerft F46 four-stroke, six-cylinder supercharged diesel engines producing a total of 2,800 to 3,200 metric horsepower (2,060 to 2,350 kW; 2,760 to 3,160 shp) for use while surfaced, two AEG GU 460/8–27 double-acting electric motors producing a total of 750 metric horsepower (550 kW; 740 shp) for use while submerged. She had two shafts and two 1.23 m (4 ft) propellers. The boat was capable of operating at depths of up to 230 metres (750 ft).

The submarine had a maximum surface speed of 17.7 knots (32.8 km/h; 20.4 mph) and a maximum submerged speed of 7.6 knots (14.1 km/h; 8.7 mph). When submerged, the boat could operate for 80 nautical miles (150 km; 92 mi) at 4 knots (7.4 km/h; 4.6 mph); when surfaced, she could travel 8,500 nautical miles (15,700 km; 9,800 mi) at 10 knots (19 km/h; 12 mph). U-441 was fitted with five 53.3 cm (21 in) torpedo tubes (four fitted at the bow and one at the stern), fourteen torpedoes, one 8.8 cm (3.46 in) SK C/35 naval gun, 220 rounds, and an anti-aircraft gun. The boat had a complement of between forty-four and sixty.

== Service history ==
=== First and second patrols ===
Her first patrol took her from Kiel, Germany to Brest in occupied France, via Trondheim in Norway and the mid-Atlantic, between 17 September and 7 November 1942, spending 38 days at sea.

Her second patrol, sailing from Brest (where she was based for the rest of her career), on 7 December 1942, again took her out into the mid-Atlantic where on 27 December she sank the Dutch 7,051 GRT cargo ship Soekaboemi, part of Convoy ON 154. The ship had been wrecked and abandoned after being struck by a torpedo from U-356 hours before. The U-boat returned to Brest on 22 January 1943.

=== Third patrol, conversion and fourth patrol ===
U-441 departed on 27 February 1943 for another Atlantic patrol, but had no success. On 20 March the boat was attacked by a Sunderland aircraft west of Ireland and slightly damaged. She returned to Brest on 11 April after 44 days at sea.

In April–May 1943, in recognition of the air threat, U-441 was converted into the first of four U-flak boats, which were designed to be surface escorts for attack U-boats operating from the French Atlantic bases and intended to lure unsuspecting aircraft into a deadly trap. The U-flak boats had greatly increased anti-aircraft firepower, U-441 was fitted with additional gun platforms forward and aft of the conning tower, which served as a base for two four-barrelled Flakvierling 20 mm flak guns and one 3.7 cm (1.5 in) Flak M42 weapon, as well as a number of MG 42 machine guns. U-441 was re-designated U-flak 1. The increased anti-aircraft capability required additional personnel, so crew numbers were increased from 44 to 48 men to 67.

As Kptlt. Klaus Hartmann was seriously ill, U-flak 1 sailed from Brest on 22 May 1943 under the command of Kptlt. Götz von Hartmann, formerly of U-563. It was not long before the new configuration was put to the test. At 20:50 on the 24th, the flak boat was attacked by a Sunderland of 228 squadron RAF in the Bay of Biscay. Despite being hit by heavy anti-aircraft fire, the aircraft managed to drop five depth charges before it crashed into the sea; the attack wounded one crewman and extensively damaged U-Flak 1 which returned to base the next day.

=== Fifth patrol ===
Her second patrol as a U-flak boat began on 8 July 1943. On the 12th the boat was strafed by three Beaufighter aircraft from No. 248 Squadron RAF. Ten men were killed and thirteen others wounded, including all of the officers. Marine-Stabsarzt Dr. Paul Pfaffinger, an experienced U-boat doctor took command, and brought the boat safely back to Brest, subsequently being awarded the German Cross in Gold. By this time the U-flak boats were considered a failure and U-flak 1 was converted back to her original configuration and reverted to U-441.

=== Sixth, seventh and eighth patrols ===
With Kptlt. Klaus Hartmann returning to command the U-441, she made three unsuccessful patrols between October 1943 and May 1944. The only incident of note was when she was unsuccessfully attacked by an unknown aircraft on 2 March 1944.

=== Ninth patrol and sinking ===
U-441 sailed from Brest for the final time on 6 June 1944, ("D-Day"), and headed into the English Channel. There, on 7 June she was involved in the shooting down of a Canadian Vickers Wellington, although other U-boats, such as U-413 or U-740, are also mentioned in the sources. The submarine did not establish radio contact after 8 June and was lost with all hands thereafter, but her fate is not sure. Probably she was one of two U-boats sunk on 8 June by depth charges dropped from a Liberator of 224 Squadron RAF, piloted by Kenneth Owen Moore. Earlier publications connected sinking U-441 with Polish Wellington Mk XIV from 304 Squadron, piloted by Leopold Antoniewicz, which was credited with sinking a submarine on 18 June in the approximate position 49°03′N 04°48′W. There also exists a version, that she was sunk on 30 June, 30 nautical miles (56 km; 35 mi) off Ushant, in the approximate position 48°27′N 05°47′W, by depth charges dropped from a Liberator of 224 Squadron, RAF.

=== Wolfpacks ===
U-441 took part in 13 wolfpacks, namely:

- Panther (10 – 16 October 1942)
- Puma (16 – 29 October 1942)
- Spitz (22 – 28 December 1942)
- Falke (28 December 1942 – 14 January 1943)
- Neuland (6 – 13 March 1943)
- Dränger (14 – 20 March 1943)
- Seewolf (21 – 28 March 1943)
- Schill (25 – 31 October 1943)
- Hinein (26 January – 3 February 1944)
- Igel 1 (3 – 17 February 1944)
- Hai 1 (17 – 22 February 1944)
- Preussen (22 February – 1 March 1944)
- Dragoner (21 – 28 May 1944)

== Summary of raiding history ==
Date	Ship Name	Nationality	Tonnage (GRT)	Fate
27 December 1942	Soekaboemi	Netherlands	7,051	Sunk

== Bibliography ==
- Bishop, Chris (2006). Kriegsmarine U-Boats, 1939-45. London: Amber Books. ISBN 978-1-904687-96-2.
- Busch, Rainer; Röll, Hans-Joachim (1999). German U-boat commanders of World War II : a biographical dictionary. Translated by Brooks, Geoffrey. London, Annapolis, Md: Greenhill Books, Naval Institute Press. ISBN 1-55750-186-6.
- Busch, Rainer; Röll, Hans-Joachim (1999). Deutsche U-Boot-Verluste von September 1939 bis Mai 1945 [German U-boat losses from September 1939 to May 1945]. Der U-Boot-Krieg (in German). Vol. IV. Hamburg, Berlin, Bonn: Mittler. ISBN 3-8132-0514-2.
- Edwards, Bernard (1996). Dönitz and the Wolf Packs - The U-boats at War. Cassell Military Classics. p. 135. ISBN 0-304-35203-9.
- Gröner, Erich; Jung, Dieter; Maass, Martin (1991). U-boats and Mine Warfare Vessels. German Warships 1815–1945. Vol. 2. Translated by Thomas, Keith; Magowan, Rachel. London: Conway Maritime Press. ISBN 0-85177-593-4.
