= HMCS Napanee =

Flower-class corvette

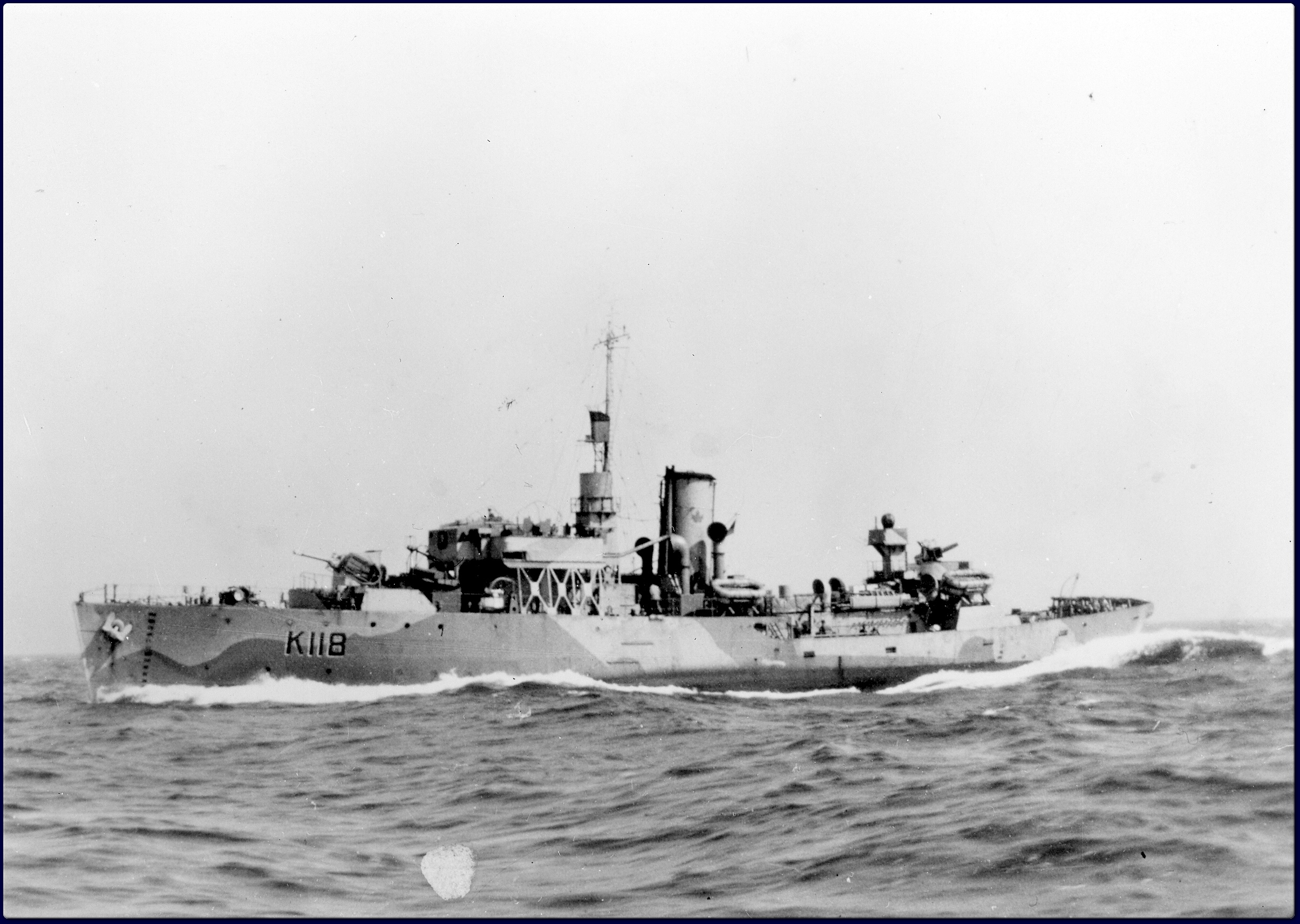
- HMCS Napanee, circa 1944-1945.

History

Canada
- Name: Napanee
- Namesake: Napanee, Ontario
- Ordered: 7 February 1940
- Builder: Kingston Shipbuilding Co., Kingston
- Laid down: 21 March 1940
- Launched: 30 August 1940
- Commissioned: 12 May 1941
- Decommissioned: 12 July 1945
- Identification: Pennant number: K118
- Honours and awards: Atlantic 1941-45
- Fate: Scrapped June 1946

General characteristics
- Class & type: Flower-class corvette (original)
- Displacement: 925 long tons (940 t; 1,036 short tons)
- Length: 205 ft (62.48 m)o/a
- Beam: 33 ft (10.06 m)
- Draught: 11.5 ft (3.51 m)
- Propulsion: Single shaft; 2 × fire tube Scotch boilers; 1 × 4-cycle triple-expansion reciprocating steam engine; 2,750 ihp (2,050 kW)
- Speed: 16 knots (29.6 km/h)
- Range: 3,500 nautical miles (6,482 km) at 12 knots (22.2 km/h)
- Complement: 85
- Sensors & processing systems: 1 × SW1C or 2C radar; 1 × Type 123A or Type 127DV sonar
- Armament: 1 × BL 4 in (102 mm) Mk.IX single gun; 2 × .50 cal machine gun (twin); 2 × Lewis .303 cal machine gun (twin); 2 × Mk.II depth charge throwers; 2 × depth charge rails with 40 depth charges; Originally fitted with minesweeping gear, later removed

HMCS Napanee was a Flower-class corvette of the Royal Canadian Navy during the Second World War. She saw service primarily in the Battle of the Atlantic as a convoy escort. She is named after Napanee, Ontario.

== Background ==
Flower-class corvettes like Napanee serving with the Royal Canadian Navy during the Second World War were different from earlier and more traditional sail-driven corvettes. The "corvette" designation was created by the French for classes of small warships; the Royal Navy borrowed the term for a period but discontinued its use in 1877. During the hurried preparations for war in the late 1930s, Winston Churchill reactivated the corvette class, needing a name for smaller ships used in an escort capacity, in this case based on a whaling ship design. The generic name "flower" was used to designate the class of these ships, which – in the Royal Navy – were named after flowering plants.

Corvettes commissioned by the Royal Canadian Navy during the Second World War were named after communities for the most part, to better represent the people who took part in building them. This idea was put forth by Admiral Percy W. Nelles. Sponsors were commonly associated with the community for which the ship was named. Royal Navy corvettes were designed as open sea escorts, while Canadian corvettes were developed for coastal auxiliary roles which was exemplified by their minesweeping gear. Eventually the Canadian corvettes would be modified to allow them to perform better on the open seas.

== Construction ==
Napanee was ordered 7 February 1940 as part of the 1939-1940 Flower-class building program. She was laid down by Kingston Shipbuilding Co. in Kingston, Ontario on 20 March 1940 and launched on 31 August 1940. She was commissioned on 12 May 1941 at Montreal, Quebec.

During her career, Napanee underwent two significant refits. Her first major overhaul began 22 May 1943 at Montreal and took five months to complete. During this refit, Napanee had her fo'c'sle extended. Her second significant refit took place at Pictou, Nova Scotia and began in August 1944.

== War duty ==
After arriving at Halifax for deployment, Napanee was initially assigned to Sydney Force. In September 1941, she was transferred to the Newfoundland Escort Force escorting convoys between St. John's and Iceland. She remained on this route until the European destination changed to Derry in January 1942.

Napanee escorted 12 trans-Atlantic convoys without loss before assignment to Mid-Ocean Escort Force (MOEF) group C1 in September 1942. With group C1, she shared credit for sinking U-356 during the battle for convoy ON 154 in December 1942, and participated in the battle for convoy KMS 10G. Napanee escorted 11 trans-Atlantic convoys without loss in 1944, and spent 1945 escorting North American coastal convoys with the Western Local Escort Force (WLEF). During her time with WLEF, Napanee was part of two escort group, W-3 initially and W-2 after her second refit until the end of the war.

=== Trans-Atlantic convoys escorted ===
| Convoy | Escort Group | Dates | Notes |
|---|---|---|---|
| SC 47 | | 29 September-12 October 1941 | 63 ships escorted without loss from Newfoundland to Iceland |
| ON 25 | | 16-24 October 1941 | 29 ships escorted without loss from Iceland to Newfoundland |
| SC 53 | | 6-20 November 1941 | 52 ships escorted without loss from Newfoundland to Iceland |
| ON 38 | | 26-30 November 1941 | 33 ships escorted without loss from Iceland to Newfoundland |
| SC 59 | | 12-21 December 1941 | 39 ships escorted without loss from Newfoundland to Iceland |
| ON 50 | | 28 December 1941 – 3 January 1942 | 35 ships escorted without loss from Iceland to Newfoundland |
| SC 65 | | 20-29 January 1942 | 36 ships escorted without loss from Newfoundland to Iceland |
| ON 62 | | 6-15 February 1942 | 34 ships escorted without loss from Iceland to Newfoundland |
| SC 71 | | 27 February-9 March 1942 | 23 ships escorted without loss from Newfoundland to Iceland |
| ON 76 | | 16-26 March 1942 | 27 ships escorted without loss from Iceland to Newfoundland |
| SC 78 | | 9-21 April 1942 | 12 ships escorted without loss from Newfoundland to Northern Ireland |
| ON 90 | | 29 April-11 May 1942 | 47 ships escorted without loss from Northern Ireland to Newfoundland |
| SC 99 | MOEF group C1 | 9-19 September 1942 | 59 ships escorted without loss from Newfoundland to Northern Ireland |
| ON 133 | MOEF group C1 | 26 September-5 Oct 1942 | 35 ships escorted without loss from Northern Ireland to Newfoundland |
| HX 211 | MOEF group C1 | 13-20 October 1942 | 29 ships escorted without loss from Newfoundland to Northern Ireland |
| ON 143 | MOEF group C1 | 2-11 November 1942 | 26 ships escorted without loss from Northern Ireland to Newfoundland |
| SC 110 | MOEF group C1 | 24 November-5 December 1942 | 33 ships escorted without loss from Newfoundland to Northern Ireland |
| ON 154 | MOEF group C1 | 19-30 December 1942 | Northern Ireland to Newfoundland; 14 ships torpedoed (13 sank) |
| HX 223 | | 19-27 January 1943 | 48 ships escorted without loss from Newfoundland to Northern Ireland |
| KMS 10G | MOEF group C1 | 28 February-8 March 1943 | Liverpool to Mediterranean Sea; 4 ships torpedoed (1 sank) |
| MKS 9 | MOEF group C1 | 8-18 March 1943 | 55 ships escorted without loss from Mediterranean to Liverpool |
| ONS 2 | MOEF group C1 | 29 March-14 April 1943 | 31 ships escorted without loss from Northern Ireland to Newfoundland |
| SC 127 | MOEF group C1 | 20 April-1 May 1943 | 55 ships escorted without loss from Newfoundland to Northern Ireland |
| ON 181 | MOEF group C1 | 2-12 May 1943 | 44 ships escorted without loss from Northern Ireland to Newfoundland |
| SC 150 | | 3-14 January 1944 | 19 ships escorted without loss from Newfoundland to Northern Ireland |
| ONS 28 | | 29 January-11 February 1944 | 29 ships escorted without loss from Northern Ireland to Newfoundland |
| HX 279 | | 17-28 February 1944 | 59 ships escorted without loss from Newfoundland to Northern Ireland |
| ON 227 | | 9-17 March 1944 | 61 ships escorted without loss from Northern Ireland to Newfoundland |
| ON 232 | | 14-23 April 1944 | 45 ships escorted without loss from Northern Ireland to Newfoundland |
| HX 290 | | 10-16 May 1944 | 93 ships escorted without loss from Newfoundland to Northern Ireland |
| ON 237 | | 20-29 May 1944 | 64 ships escorted without loss from Northern Ireland to Newfoundland |
| HX 294 | | 9-19 June 1944 | 113 ships escorted without loss from Newfoundland to Northern Ireland |
| ON 242 | | 25 June-5 July 1944 | 99 ships escorted without loss from Northern Ireland to Newfoundland |
| HX 299 | | 16-23 July 1944 | 85 ships escorted without loss from Newfoundland to Northern Ireland |
| ON 247 | | 2-10 August 1944 | 89 ships escorted without loss from Northern Ireland to Newfoundland |

== Post war service ==
Napanee was paid off on 12 July 1945 at Sorel, Quebec after the war had ended. She was sold for scrapping in June 1946 and broken up at Hamilton, Ontario.
