= HMCS Chilliwack =

Flower-class corvette

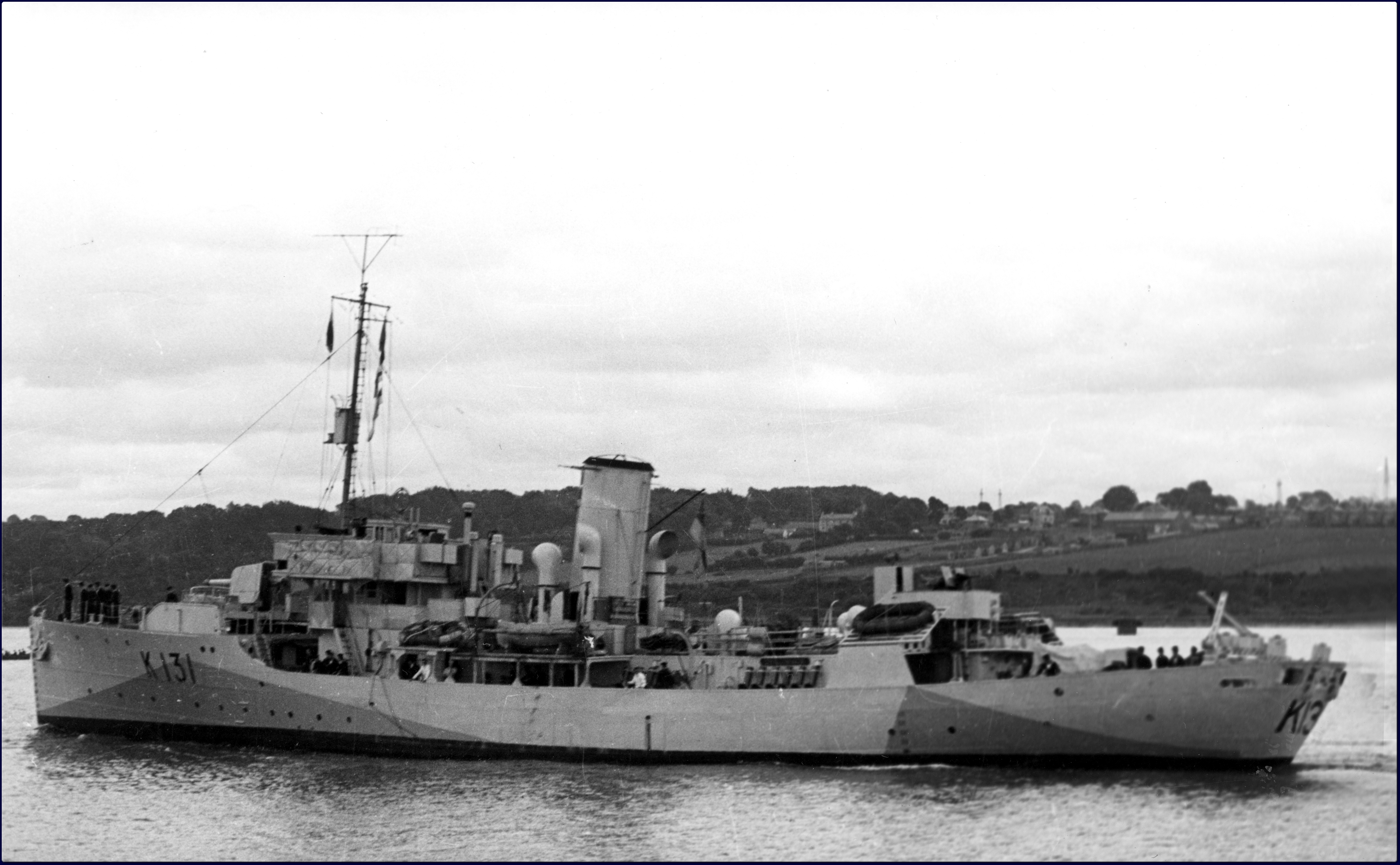
- HMCS Chilliwack, circa 1942.

History

Canada
- Name: Chilliwack
- Namesake: Chilliwack, British Columbia
- Ordered: 14 February 1940
- Builder: Burrard Dry Dock, North Vancouver
- Laid down: 3 July 1940
- Launched: 14 September 1940
- Commissioned: 8 April 1941
- Out of service: Paid off 14 July 1945
- Identification: Pennant number: K131
- Honours and awards: Atlantic 1941-45
- Fate: Scrapped 1946.

General characteristics
- Class & type: Flower-class corvette (original)
- Displacement: 925 long tons (940 t; 1,036 short tons)
- Length: 205 ft (62.48 m)o/a
- Beam: 33 ft (10.06 m)
- Draught: 11.5 ft (3.51 m)
- Propulsion: single shaft; 2 × fire tube Scotch boilers; 1 × 4-cycle triple-expansion reciprocating steam engine; 2,750 ihp (2,050 kW)
- Speed: 16 knots (29.6 km/h)
- Range: 3,500 nautical miles (6,482 km) at 12 knots (22.2 km/h)
- Complement: 85
- Sensors & processing systems: 1 × SW1C or 2C radar; 1 × Type 123A or Type 127DV sonar
- Armament: 1 × BL 4 in (102 mm) Mk.IX single gun; 2 × .50 cal machine gun (twin); 2 × Lewis .303 cal machine gun (twin); 2 × Mk.II depth charge throwers; 2 × depth charge rails with 40 depth charges; originally fitted with minesweeping gear, later removed

HMCS Chilliwack was a Flower-class corvette who served with the Royal Canadian Navy during the Second World War. She saw action primarily in the Battle of the Atlantic as a convoy escort. She was named for Chilliwack, British Columbia.

== Background ==
Flower-class corvettes like Chilliwack serving with the Royal Canadian Navy during the Second World War were different from earlier and more traditional sail-driven corvettes. The "corvette" designation was created by the French as a class of small warships; the Royal Navy borrowed the term for a period but discontinued its use in 1877. During the hurried preparations for war in the late 1930s, Winston Churchill reactivated the corvette class, needing a name for smaller ships used in an escort capacity, in this case based on a whaling ship design. The generic name "flower" was used to designate the class of these ships, which – in the Royal Navy – were named after flowering plants.

Corvettes commissioned by the Royal Canadian Navy during the Second World War were named after communities for the most part, to better represent the people who took part in building them. This idea was put forth by Admiral Percy W. Nelles. Sponsors were commonly associated with the community for which the ship was named. Royal Navy corvettes were designed as open sea escorts, while Canadian corvettes were developed for coastal auxiliary roles which was exemplified by their minesweeping gear. Eventually the Canadian corvettes would be modified to allow them to perform better on the open seas.

== Construction ==
Chilliwack was ordered on 14 February 1940 as part of the 1939-1940 Flower-class building program. At Burrard Dry Dock in North Vancouver, British Columbia she was laid down on 3 July 1940. Chilliwack was launched on 14 September 1940 and commissioned on 8 April 1941 at Vancouver. She is named after the city of Chilliwack, British Columbia. In April 1943 until October 1943, Chilliwack was refitting at Dartmouth, where her fo'c'sle was extended.

== War service ==
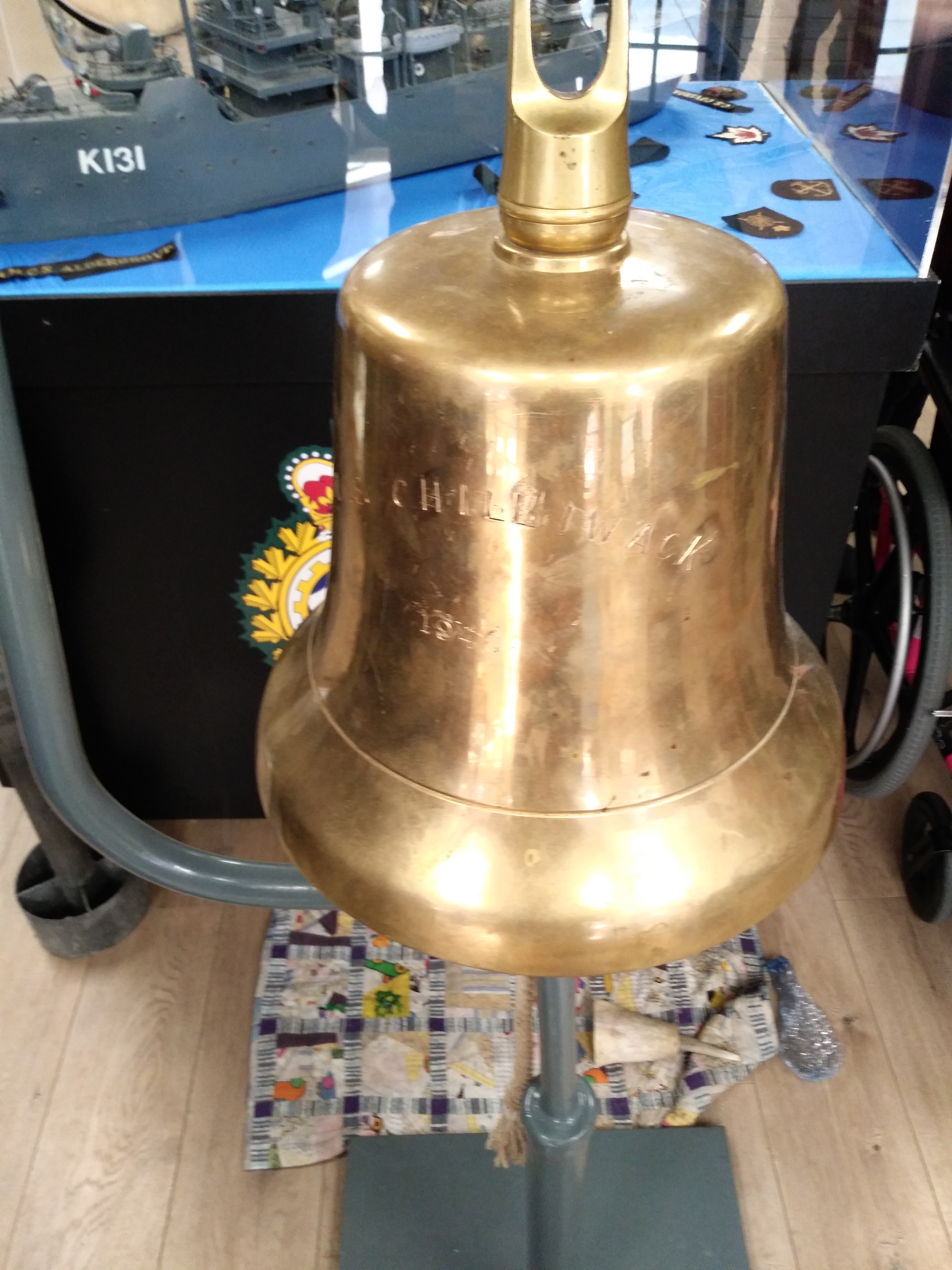
Bell from HMCS Chilliwack at the Chilliwack Military Museum, 2019

After commissioning she was sent to Halifax, arriving on 19 June 1941. She was assigned to Newfoundland Command in July and spent the rest of the year escorting convoys between St. John's and Iceland. In February 1942 she began work as an ocean escort, a position she continued with few interruptions until November 1944.

Chilliwack participated in the battle for convoy SC 67 before assignment to Mid-Ocean Escort Force (MOEF) group C1 in June 1942. With group C1, she shared credit for sinking U-356 during the battle for convoy ON 154, and participated in the battles for convoy SC 94 and convoy HX 222. Chilliwack then joined MOEF group A3 in the battle for convoy ON 166. In December 1943 after completing her refit and work up, Chilliwack joined escort group W-8 of Western Escort Force. In March 1944, she assisted in the sinking of U-744 along with several other escorts while escorting convoy HX 280. Chilliwack escorted fourteen trans-Atlantic convoys without loss in 1944 and spent 1945 escorting North American coastal convoys with the Western Local Escort Force.

In April 1945 she was reassigned to Halifax Force before being lent to escort group C-1 again for one round trip in May. Chilliwack was paid off on 14 July 1945 at Sorel, Quebec. The ship was sold after the war and scrapped in 1946.

=== Trans-Atlantic convoys escorted ===
Convoy	Escort Group	Dates	Notes
HX 145		20–25 August 1941	83 ships escorted without loss from Newfoundland to Iceland
ON 11		4–11 September 1941	63 ships escorted without loss from Iceland to Newfoundland
SC 45		21–30 September 1941	58 ships escorted without loss from Newfoundland to Iceland
ON 21		5–14 October 1941	30 ships escorted without loss from Iceland to Newfoundland
SC 51		25 October – 4 November 1941	38 ships escorted without loss from Newfoundland to Iceland
ON 33		11–19 November 1941	49 ships escorted without loss from Iceland to Newfoundland
SC 59		14–21 December 1941	39 ships escorted without loss from Newfoundland to Iceland
ON 50		28 December 1941 – 3 January 1942	35 ships escorted without loss from Iceland to Newfoundland
SC 67		30 January – 11 February 1942	Newfoundland to Iceland; 1 ship torpedoed & sunk
ON 66		18–25 February 1942	19 ships escorted without loss from Iceland to Newfoundland
HX 178		6–16 March 1942	22 ships escorted without loss from Newfoundland to Iceland
ON 79		24 March – 1 April 1942	29 ships escorted without loss from Iceland to Newfoundland
HX 195	MOEF group C1	24 June – 1 July 1942	30 ships escorted without loss from Newfoundland to Iceland
ON 112	MOEF group C1	14–25 July 1942	36 ships escorted without loss from Northern Ireland to Newfoundland
SC 94	MOEF group C1	2–8 August 1942	Newfoundland to Northern Ireland; 10 ships torpedoed & sunk
ON 123	MOEF group C1	22–31 August 1942	39 ships escorted without loss from Northern Ireland to Newfoundland
SC 99	MOEF group C1	9–19 September 1942	59 ships escorted without loss from Newfoundland to Northern Ireland
ON 133	MOEF group C1	26 September – 5 Oct 1942	35 ships escorted without loss from Northern Ireland to Newfoundland
HX 211	MOEF group C1	13–20 October 1942	29 ships escorted without loss from Newfoundland to Northern Ireland
ON 143	MOEF group C1	2–11 November 1942	26 ships escorted without loss from Northern Ireland to Newfoundland
SC 110	MOEF group C1	24 November – 5 December 1942	33 ships escorted without loss from Halifax to Newfoundland
ON 154	MOEF group C1	19–30 December 1942	Northern Ireland to Newfoundland; 14 ships torpedoed (13 sank)
HX 222	MOEF group C1	11–22 January 1943	Newfoundland to Northern Ireland; 1 ship torpedoed & sunk
ON 166	MOEF group A3	12–25 February 1943	Northern Ireland to Newfoundland; 12 ships torpedoed (11 sank)
HX 265		11–20 November 1943	51 ships escorted without loss from Newfoundland to Northern Ireland
ONS 24		1–13 December 1943	29 ships escorted without loss from Northern Ireland to Newfoundland
HX 271		20–29 December 1943	53 ships escorted without loss from Newfoundland to Northern Ireland
ON 221		25 January – 6 February 1944	63 ships escorted without loss from Northern Ireland to Newfoundland
HX 280		2–5 March 1944	63 ships escorted without loss from Newfoundland to Northern Ireland
ON 230		31 March – 9 April 1944	66 ships escorted without loss from Northern Ireland to Newfoundland
HX 287		12–17 April 1944	71 ships escorted without loss from Newfoundland to Northern Ireland
ON 235		5–14 May 1944	65 ships escorted without loss from Northern Ireland to Newfoundland
HX 292		19–22 May 1944	128 ships escorted without loss from Newfoundland to Northern Ireland
ON 240		11–22 June 1944	85 ships escorted without loss from Northern Ireland to Newfoundland
HX 297		30 June – 10 July 1944	116 ships escorted without loss from Newfoundland to Northern Ireland
ON 245		19–28 July 1944	101 ships escorted without loss from Northern Ireland to Newfoundland
HX 302		8–16 August 1944	96 ships escorted without loss from Newfoundland to Northern Ireland
ON 250		25 August – 4 September 1944	76 ships escorted without loss from Northern Ireland to Newfoundland
