= Convoy ON 154 =

Convoy during naval battles of the Second World War

- Part of the Battle of the Atlantic
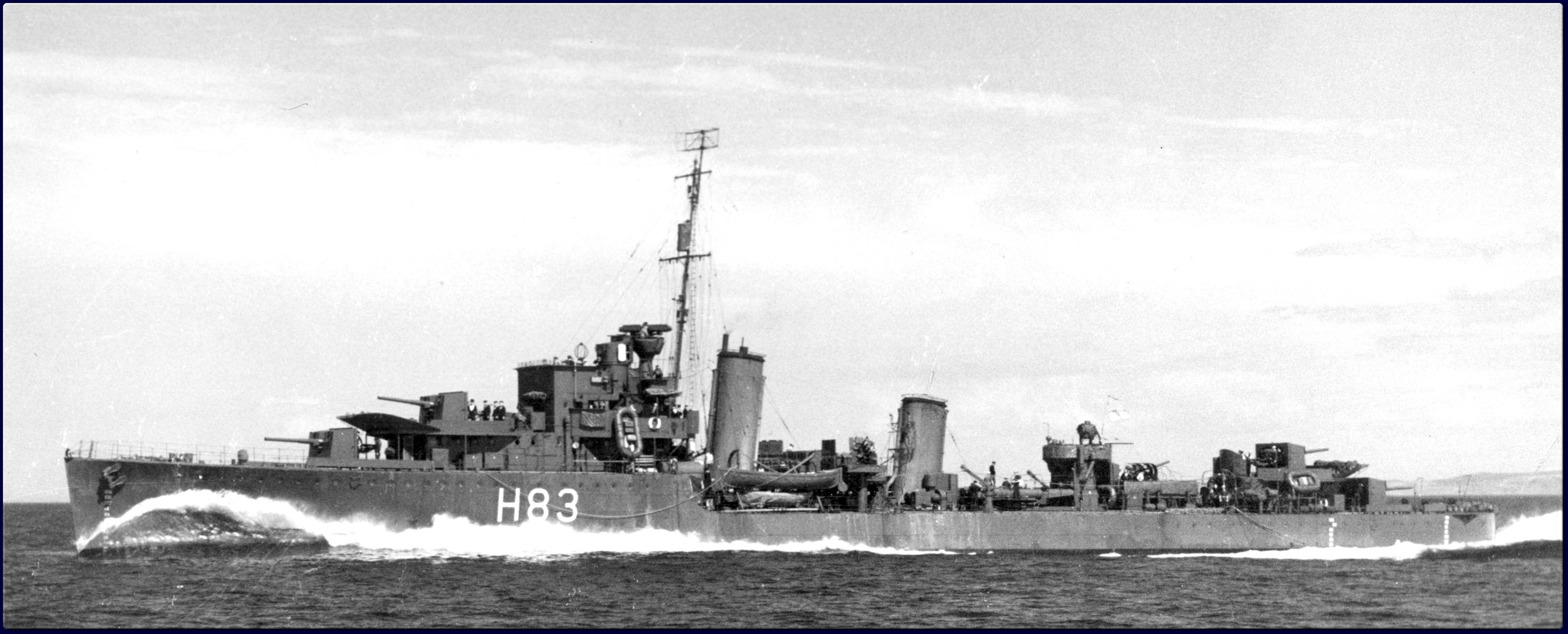
- HMCS St. Laurent
Date	26–30 December 1942
Location	North Atlantic
Result	German victory

Belligerents
Royal Canadian Navy; Royal Navy; United States Navy	Kriegsmarine

Commanders and leaders
Wion de Malpas Egerton †; Guy Windeyer	Admiral Karl Dönitz

Strength
50 freighters 1 destroyer 5 corvettes 1 Special Service Vessel	20 submarines

Casualties and losses
13 merchant ships sunk [66,922 GRT] 177 killed 1 Special Service Vessel sunk 369 killed	1 submarine sunk 46 killed

Convoy ON 154 (alternatively Convoy ON(S) 154 or Convoy ONS 154) was a North Atlantic convoy of the ON convoys which ran during the battle of the Atlantic in the Second World War. (Note: Convoy ON 154 was a slow convoy of the ON series. It is described in some sources as ON(S) 154 or ONS 154 but this is a misnomer; the ONS convoys were a separate series which did not commence until March 1943.) It was the 154th of the numbered series of merchant ship convoys Outbound from the British Isles to North America. It came under attack in December 1942 and lost 13 of its 50 freighters; one U-boat was sunk.

== Background ==
As western Atlantic coastal convoys brought an end to the second happy time, Admiral Karl Dönitz, the Befehlshaber der U-Boote (BdU, commander in chief U-boats) shifted focus to the mid-Atlantic to avoid aircraft patrols. Although convoy routing was less predictable in mid-ocean, Dönitz anticipated that the increased numbers of U-boats being produced would be able to search for convoys. Only 20 per cent of the 180 trans-Atlantic convoys sailing from the end of July 1942 until the end of April 1943 lost ships to U-boat attack.

=== Bletchley Park ===
The British Government Code and Cypher School (GC&CS) based at Bletchley Park housed a small industry of code-breakers and traffic analysts. By June 1941, the German Enigma machine Home Waters (Heimish) settings used by surface ships and U-boats could quickly be read. On 1 February 1942, the Enigma machines used in U-boats in the Atlantic and Mediterranean were changed to a four-rotor Enigma (Shark to the British). By mid-1941, British Y-stations were able to receive and read Luftwaffe W/T transmissions and give advance warning of Luftwaffe operations. In November 1942 the diversion of U-boats to North-West Africa against Operation Torch reduced losses on Atlantic convoys but world losses rose to 721,700 long tons (733,300 t) the worst month of the war. Only two U-boat s were sunk in November. In mid-December GC&CS began to break the four-rotor enigma messages. Having broken one Shark cypher in mid-December, the delay in breaking them was serious and on 25 December, no settings had been found for the last six days. From 25 December to 1 January 1943 traffic was read quickly.

=== B-Dienst ===
The German Beobachtungsdienst (B-Dienst, Observation Service) of the Kriegsmarine Marinenachrichtendienst (MND, Naval Intelligence Service) had broken several Admiralty codes and cyphers by 1939, which were used to help Kriegsmarine ships elude British ships and provide opportunities for surprise attacks. From June to August 1940, six British submarines were sunk in the Skaggerak using information gleaned from British wireless signals. In 1941, B-Dienst read signals from the Commander-in-Chief, Western Approaches, informing convoys of areas patrolled by U-boats, enabling the submarines to move into "safe" zones. B-Dienst broke Combined Naval Cipher No. 3 in February 1942 and by March was reading up to 80 per cent of the traffic, which continued until 15 December 1942. By coincidence, the British lost access to the Shark cypher and had no information to send in Cypher No 3 which might compromise Ultra.

== Prelude ==
Convoy formation, long rows, short columns (Note: Convoys had a standard formation of short columns, number 1 to port in the direction of travel. Each position in the column was numbered; 11 was the first ship in column 1 and 12 was the second ship in the column; 21 was the first ship in column 2.)
column 1	column 2	column 3	column 4
11 Ship	21 Ship	31 Ship	41 Ship
12 Ship	22 Ship	32 Ship	42 Ship
13 Ship	23 Ship	33 Ship	43 Ship

The ships departed Liverpool on 18 December 1942 and comprised 50 merchant ships, in ballast or carrying trade goods. The convoy commodore was Vice Admiral (Retd.) Wion de Malpas Egerton in Empire Shackleton. The convoy sailed in twelve columns of three or four ships each. The convoy formation was five miles (8 km) wide and 1.5 miles (2.4 km) long. Convoy ON 154 was a slow convoy, made up of ships that could manage 8 kn (15 km/h; 9.2 mph) at best. Slow convoys were particularly vulnerable, as their speed was matched by the submerged speed of the U-boats and was just half their surface speed, thus making it easier for a wolfpack to form around it. In the North Atlantic were the U-boat wolfpacks Ungestum with 13 boats and Spitz with 11 boats, on patrol in the Mid-Atlantic gap, where Allied air cover was unable to reach. A third pack, Falke acted as a reserve but attacked Convoy HX 219 instead.

The ocean escort for Convoy ON 154 was the Royal Canadian Navy (RCN) Mid-Ocean Escort Force Group C-1, led by Lieutenant-Commander Guy Windeyer in the River-class destroyer HMCS St. Laurent. The group comprised the Flower-class corvettes HMCS Battleford, Chilliwack, Kenogami, Napanee, and Shediac. The Town-class destroyer HMS Burwell had mechanical defects, did not sail and was not replaced with another destroyer. RCN ships generally suffered from overwork compared to their Royal Navy equivalents, and were more likely to be un-modernized. Convoy ON 154 included the convoy rescue ship Toward, the oiler Scottish Heather and the French-crewed 2,456 GRT special service vessel HMS Fidelity. Fidelity was armed with four 4 in (100 mm) guns, four torpedo tubes and a defensive torpedo net. She carried the landing craft LCV-752 and LCV-754, two Kingfisher floatplanes and the Motor Torpedo Boat MTB 105.

== Action ==
=== 26/27 December ===
The winter of 1942–1943 turned out to be the worst in the Atlantic for thirty years. In November, convoys were routed further south than usual, which took them away from the air cover from northern bases, when Allied Anti-submarine warfare (ASW) aircraft were not grounded by the weather. Convoy ON 154 was routed south towards the Azores to avoid the winter storms and remained distant from escort support groups for longer than usual. U-662 reported the convoy on 26 December. That night U-356 torpedoed the leading ships from two of the starboard columns. Empire Union was hit at 01:40, Melrose Abbey was hit ten minutes later. Both British freighters sank at about 02:30. Toward rescued 63 survivors from the first ship and 47 from the second. In a second attack, U-356 torpedoed the Dutch freighter Soekaboemi at 04:10 and the British freighter King Edward at 04:15. King Edward sank within three minutes. U-356 was detected by the escorts and was sunk with no survivors following depth charge attacks by St. Laurent, Chilliwack, Battleford and Napanee. At dawn, Toward rescued 25 men from King Edward and assisted Napanee, recovering all but one of Soekaboemi's crew, the ship remaining afloat when abandoned at 07:30.

=== 27/28 December ===
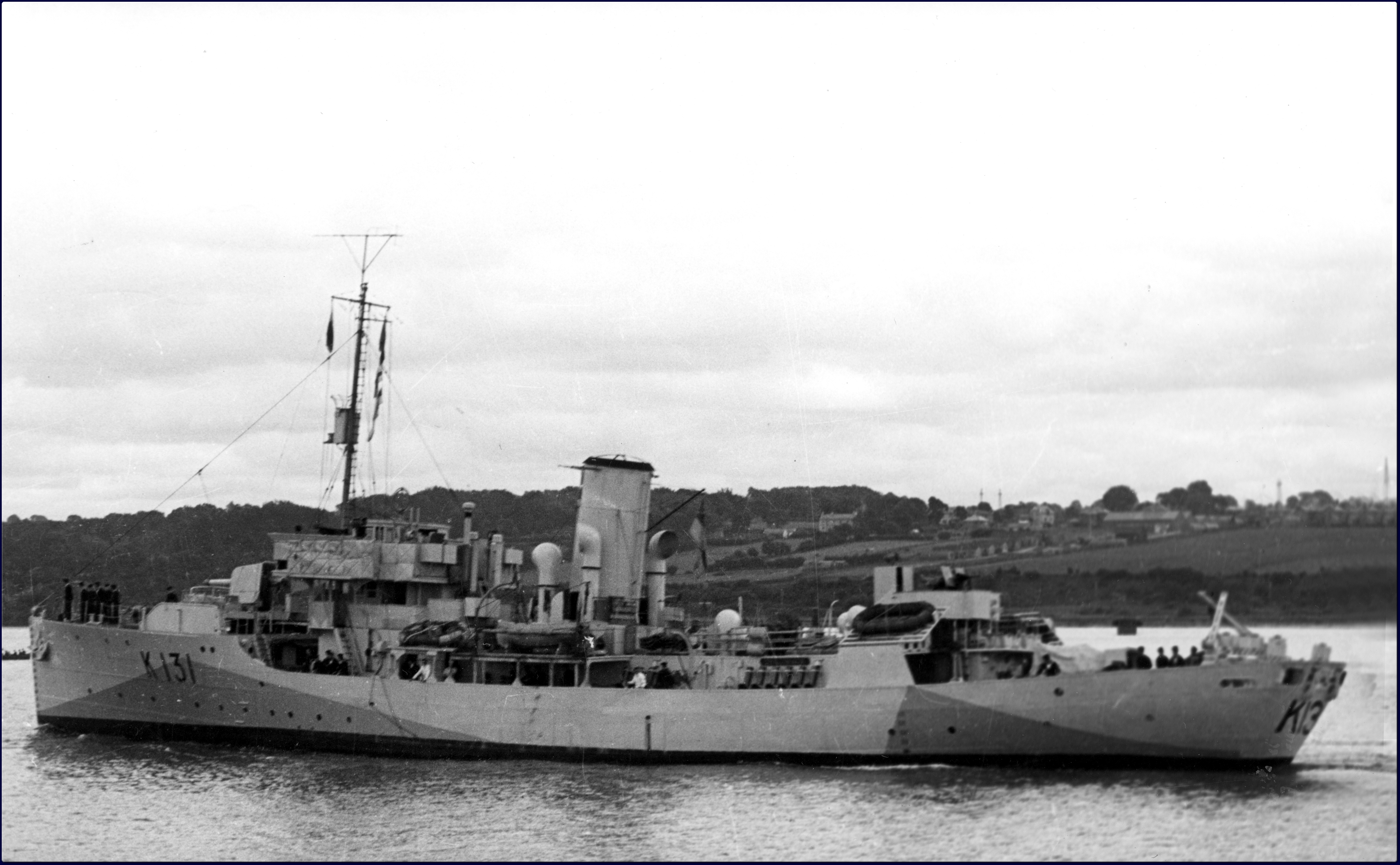
HMCS Chilliwack, photographed c. 1942

U-225 began stalking Scottish Heather as she refuelled some of the escorts 15 nmi (28 km; 17 mi) astern of the convoy on the afternoon of 27 December. U-225 was twice driven off by Chilliwack before hitting the oiler with a torpedo in a third approach at 20:40. The ship was temporarily abandoned but the second mate re-boarded her with ten men and sailed the ship out of the danger zone. At dawn he returned and pattern-searched for lifeboats. The oiler returned to England independently after recovering all of her crew.

=== 28/29 December ===
U-260 began shadowing the convoy on the morning of 28 December and directed 18 U-boats to the convoy. Fidelity attempted to launch a Kingfisher but it capsized and sank at 19:15. While St. Laurent rescued the Kingfisher crew, a coordinated night attack began with U-boats entering the starboard side of the convoy at 19:58. U-591 torpedoed the Norwegian freighter Norse King at 20:00. U-225 torpedoed the British freighters Melmore Head at 20:03 and Ville de Rouen at 20:05. U-260 torpedoed the British freighter Empire Wagtail at 20:45. As Empire Wagtail disintegrated in an explosion that claimed all of her crew, Fidelity reported a main engine failure and Shediac was sent to assist her two miles (3.2 km) astern of the convoy.

Relief map of the North Atlantic Ocean

U-boats then entered the port side of the convoy. U-406 torpedoed the British freighters Lynton Grange at 21:20, Zarian at 21:23, and Baron Cochrane at 21:24. U-662 hit the damaged Ville de Rouen again at 22:10 and U-225 torpedoed the convoy commodore's freighter Empire Shackleton at 22:15 and the Belgian freighter President Francoui at 22:30. Disabled ships were also being attacked astern of the convoy. Baron Cochrane was sunk at 21:50 by U-123 and U-628 sank Lynton Grange a few minutes later. The crews had abandoned both ships when they were hit earlier. U-123 and U-435 sank Empire Shackleton at 22:55. U-591 sank the abandoned Zarian just before midnight.

Shediac was ordered to leave Fidelity 30 miles (48 km) astern and rejoin the convoy while searching for survivors. Shediac rescued 35 survivors from Melmore Head and 71 from Ville de Rouen between 03:10 and 03:30 and 24 from Empire Shackleton at 05:30. Shediac rejoined the convoy at 13:00 short of fuel and with inadequate provisions for the number of survivors aboard. Two lifeboats abandoned the damaged President Francoui, but the remainder of the crew attempted to sail independently to the Azores. U-225 torpedoed the ship again at 06:30 and it was sunk at 09:30 by U-336. The damaged Norse King was similarly attempting to reach the Azores when she was sunk by U-435 at 15:07. There were no survivors. The convoy escort was reinforced by the M-class destroyers HMS Milne and Meteor at 14:00 on 29 December after the arriving destroyers rescued 42 survivors from Baron Cochrane at 07:00, 52 survivors from Lynton Grange at 07:20 and 49 survivors from Zarian at 08:15.

==== HMS Fidelity 29/30 December ====
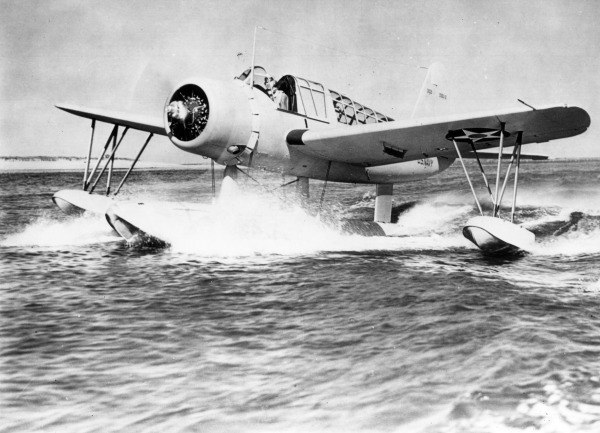
Photograph of a US Navy Vought OS2U Kingfisher on the water

Fidelity restarted main engines at 05:00 and declined the offer to dispatch a tug from Gibraltar. Speed was limited to two knots while streaming anti-torpedo nets when observed by Meteor and Milne at 05:30. U-615 found Fidelity while her main engines were again stopped for repairs between 10:15 and 11:00. U-615 identified Fidelity as a Q-ship and shadowed her cautiously. A reconnaissance flight by Fidelity's remaining Kingfisher observed two shadowing submarines and two of Empire Shackleton's lifeboats. Fidelity launched LCV-752 and LCV-754 to retrieve the lifeboats. Fidelity recovered the Kingfisher and the two landing craft with Empire Shackleton's survivors that afternoon and launched MTB-105 to conduct anti-submarine patrols through the night.

U-615 launched four torpedoes at Fidelity at about 20:00 but the anti-torpedo net protected the ship from damage. MTB-105 had engine trouble and lost contact with Fidelity at about 23:00. MTB-105 heard radio calls from Fidelity shortly after dawn but had inadequate battery power to respond. U-435 torpedoed Fidelity at 16:30 and was surprised by the size of the resulting explosion and by the large number of men subsequently seen floating in the water where the ship had sunk. MTB-105 rigged a makeshift sail to try and reach land. Fidelity had on board 369 people (274 crew, 51 Marines and 44 survivors from Empire Shackleton), all were lost at sea, including Egerton, the convoy commodore.

=== 30 December ===
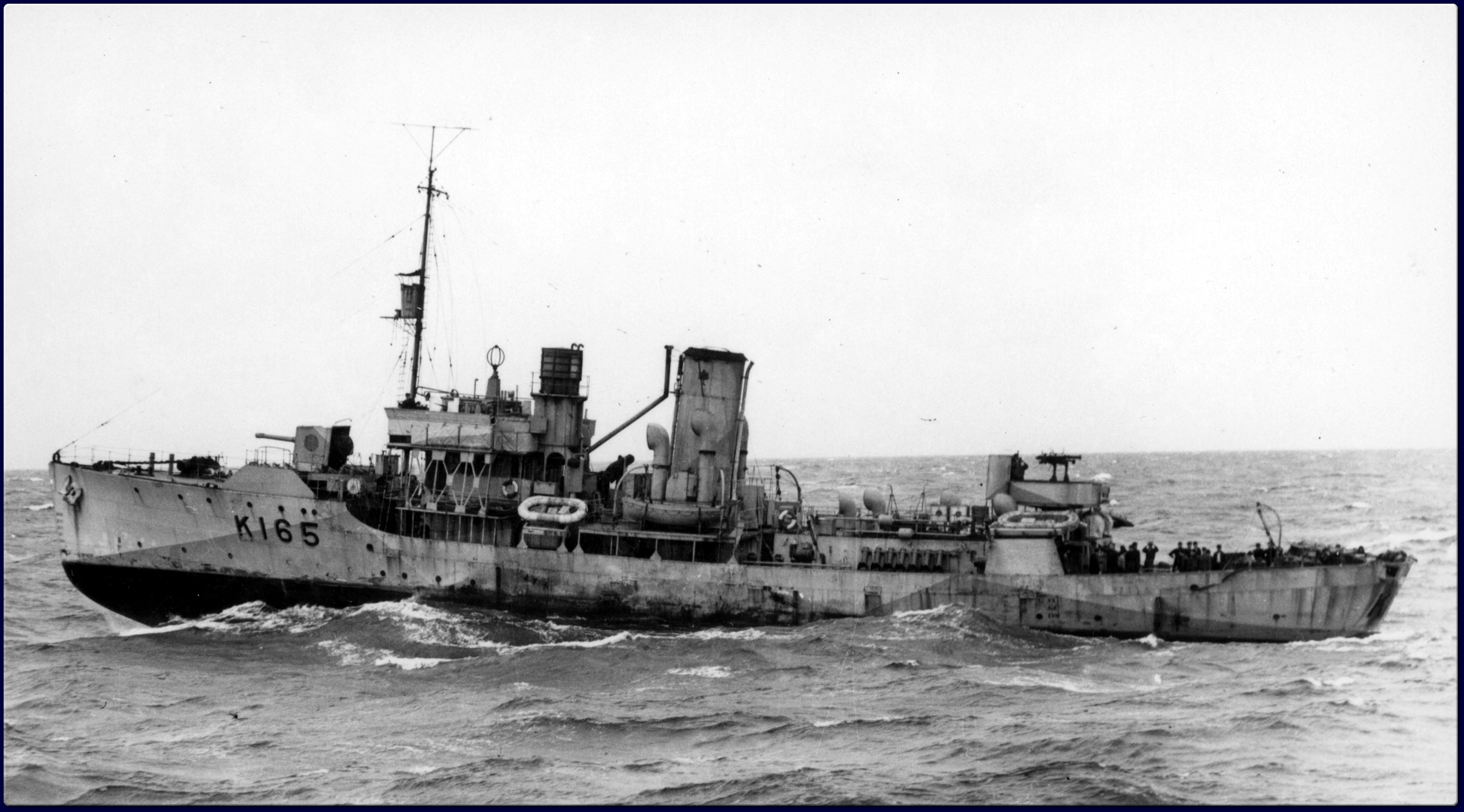
HMCS Battleford, photographed on 5 October 1943 off the US east coast

On 30 December British destroyer HMS Fame arrived, Commander Ralph Heathcote, the commander of B-6 Escort Group taking over,

Windeyer, exhausted by the ordeal and now seeing torpedoes at every turn, was put to bed.

Battleford, Shediac, Milne and Meteor were released on 30 December to refuel in the Azores, leaving only four escorts remaining and as many as twelve U-boats in contact with the convoy. Following the loss of the convoy commodore, the two fast ships with large passenger complements (Calgary and Advastun), were invited to escape if they found an opportunity. HMCS St. Francis and the V-class destroyer HMS Viceroy reinforced the convoy escort before nightfall on 30 December. B-Dienst warned BdU of the reinforcement of the convoy escorts and the U-boats were ordered to disengage, many to rendezvous with U-117 to the west of the Azores.

Shediac and Meteor ran out of fuel before reaching the Azores. Battleford towed Shediac the last 40 nmi (74 km; 46 mi) and Meteor was towed the last 5 nmi (9.3 km; 5.8 mi). Once refuelled, the four ships joined the search for survivors from Fidelity. On 1 January, Woodstock found and rescued the eight men aboard MTB-105, which included the two aircrew from the Kingfisher but aside from the two-man Kingfisher crew rescued earlier by St. Laurent, there were no other survivors from Fidelity's crew of 325 and the men rescued from Empire Shackleton. Prescott also saved 26 men from President Francoui whose Chief Officer, Lagay, reported that the conduct of some of the survivors had been less than admirable, malingering, insubordination and violence being reported. Scottish Heather reached the Clyde on 2 January and the remainder of the convoy reached New York City on 12 January 1943.

== Analysis ==
Map showing the location of the Azores

Convoy ON 154 lost 14 ships of 69,378 GRT and 486 men killed. It ranked as one of the worst North Atlantic convoy disasters of the war. The Admiralty was critical of the Canadians, comparing the convoy unfavourably with the transit of Convoy ON 155 escorted by B-6 escort group without loss. Blair (2000) and Milner (2018) point out that the Admiralty also bore responsibility for routing the convoy so far south, through the widest part of the Air Gap, that took five days to cross. Escort Group C-1 was also expected to operate with a destroyer short, inadequate provision for re-fueling and with without modern equipment, against a pack that outnumbered it by four to one. Milner wrote that Escort Group B-6 had been given a more northerly course and a faster convoy and that the Canadian groups had generally been assigned to the more vulnerable slow convoys of the SC and ON(S) series, while the British groups had the faster HX and ON convoys.

Analysis of the convoy's losses also shows that of the fourteen ships sunk, nine were lost outside the convoy, having been damaged or disabled in a previous attack and straggled. After the first attack by U-356 only U-225, U-406, U-591, U-260 and U-123 had penetrated the escort screen, while the rest of the pack had picked off the stragglers. Blair also points out that the German success against Convoy ON 154 was an exception; in December the Allies ran 16 trans-Atlantic convoys, containing some 650 ships; only three of them were attacked and only twenty ships had been sunk (i.e. apart from the fourteen in Convoy ON 154, only two from Convoy HX 217 and four from Convoy ON 153), plus seven other ships sailing independently.

== Aftermath ==
=== Analysis ===
The attack on Convoy ON 154 was undoubtedly a success for the Germans, but the safe arrival of over two-thirds of the convoy's ships and the destruction of one of the attackers, whilst being outnumbered by nearly four to one, was not a complete failure by the escort forces. The Admiralty took the drastic decision to withdraw the Canadian escort groups from the Atlantic, for intensive training at the Royal Navy facilities at Liverpool and Tobermory; refitting the Canadian escort ships with modern equipment, a tacit acceptance of the complaints of the Canadian Navy. The burden of escorting slow convoys on the Atlantic route fell to the British, leading to experiences not dissimilar to those suffered by the Canadians.

== Orders of battle ==
=== Convoy ON 154 ===
Convoyed ships
Name	Year	Flag	GRT	Notes
Aldrastus	1923	United Kingdom	7,905	
Algorab	1922	Netherlands	4,938	Destination Cape Town
SS Baron Cochrane	1927	United Kingdom	3,385	Damaged U-406, 43°23′N, 27°14′W, Sunk U-123 2† 42 surv
Baron Elgin	1933	United Kingdom	3,942	
Baron Inchcape	1917	United Kingdom	7,005	
SS Belle Isle	1932	United States	1,960	
Berkel	1930	Netherlands	2,130	
SS Bonita	1918	Panama	4,929	
MV Bornholm	1930	United Kingdom	3,177	
SS Calgary	1921	United Kingdom	7,206	
MV Dundrum Castle	1919	United Kingdom	5,259	
E G Seubert	1918	United States	9,181	
Empire Cougar	1919	United Kingdom	5,758	
Empire Geraint	1942	United Kingdom	6,991	
Empire Shackleton	1941	United Kingdom	7,068	Commodore Wion Egerton, sunk, U-225, U-123, U-435 37 killed
Empire Simba	1919	United Kingdom	5,691	
Empire Union	1921	United Kingdom	5,952	Sunk by U-356, 6 killed
Empire Wagtail	1919	United Kingdom	4,893	Sunk by U-260, all 43 crew killed
Esturia	1914	United Kingdom	6,968	
Euthalia	1918	Greece	4,770	
Fana	1939	Norway	1,375	
Fort Lamy	1919	United Kingdom	5,234	Vice-Convoy Commodore
Henry R Mallory	1916	United States	6,063	
MV James Hawson	1930	Norway	6,074	Tanker
Janeta	1929	United Kingdom	5,312	
Jasper Park	1942	United Kingdom	7,129	
King Edward	1919	United Kingdom	5,224	Sunk, 27 December, U-356, 47°25′N, 25°20′W, 23† 25 surv
Kiruna	1921	Sweden	5,513	
Lynton Grange	1937	United Kingdom	5,029	Sunk, 28 December, U-406, U-628, 43°23′N, 27°14′W, 0† 52 surv
SS Melmore Head	1918	United Kingdom	5,273	Sunk, 28 December, U-225, 43°27′N, 27°15′W, 14† 35 surv
Melrose Abbey II	1936	United Kingdom	2,473	Sunk, 27 December, U-356, 47°30′N, 24°30′W, 7† 27 surv
Norhauk	1919	Norway	6,086	
Norse King	1920	Norway	5,701	Sunk, 28 December, U-591, U-435, 43°27′N, 27°15′W, 35† 0 surv
MV Northmoor	1928	United Kingdom	4,392	To Cape Town, arr. 30 December
Olney	1920	United States	7,294	
MV President Francqui	1928	Belgium	5,077	Sunk 28 December, U-225, U-336, 43°23′N, 27°14′W, 5† 44 surv (Note: One survivor taken prisoner.)
Ramo	1921	Norway	2,334	
Ravnefjell	1938	Norway	1,339	
Runswick	1930	United Kingdom	3,970	Returned to England
Scottish Heather	1928	United Kingdom	7,005	Escort oiler, damaged U-225, turned back
SS Soekaboemi	1923	Netherlands	7,051	Sunk, 27 December, U-356, U-441, 47°25′M, 25°20′W, 1† 65 surv
Toward	1923	United Kingdom	1,571	convoy rescue ship
Tynemouth	1940	United Kingdom	3,168	
Umgeni	1938	United Kingdom	8,382	Detached 1 January
Veni	1901	Norway	3,006	
Vest	1920	Norway	5,074	
Ville de Rouen	1919	United Kingdom	5,083	Sunk, 28 December, U-225, U-662, 4325N, 2715W, 0† 71 surv
MV Vistula	1920	United States	8,537	
Wisla	1928	Poland	3,106	
Zarian	1938	United Kingdom	4,871	Sunk, 29 December, U-406, U-591, 43°23′N, 27°14′W, 4† 49 surv

=== Mid-ocean escort force ===
C1 Escort Group
Name	Flag	Type	Dates	Notes
HMCS St. Laurent	Royal Canadian Navy	C-class destroyer	20– December 1942	Delayed sailing, defective HF/DF
HMS Burwell	Royal Navy	Clemson-class destroyer	—	Did not sail, engine trouble
HMCS Battleford	Royal Canadian Navy	Flower-class corvette	18–30 December 1942	Detached to fuel at Azores
HMCS Chilliwack	Royal Canadian Navy	Flower-class corvette	18– December 1942	
HMCS Kenogami	Royal Canadian Navy	Flower-class corvette	18– December 1942	
HMCS Napanee	Royal Canadian Navy	Flower-class corvette	18– December 1942	
HMCS Shediac	Royal Canadian Navy	Flower-class corvette	18–30 December 1942	Detached to fuel at Azores
HMS Fidelity	Royal Navy	Special service vessel	18– December 1942	

=== Escort reinforcements ===
Escort reinforcements
Name	Flag	Type	Dates	Notes
HMCS St. Francis	Royal Canadian Navy	Clemson-class destroyer	30– December	
HMS Viceroy	Royal Navy	V-class destroyer	30– December	
HMS Fame	Royal Navy	F-class destroyer	30– December	Cdr Ralph Heathcote Escort Group B6
HMS Meteor	Royal Navy	M-class destroyer	29–31 December	Detached to fuel at Ponta Delgada, Azores
HMS Milne	Royal Navy	M-class destroyer	29–31 December	Detached to fuel at Ponta Delgada, Azores
USS Cole	United States Navy	Wickes-class destroyer	1– January 1943	
HMS Mansfield	Royal Navy	Wickes-class destroyer	2– January 1943	West Support Force
HMCS Arrowhead	Royal Canadian Navy	Flower-class corvette	2–8 January 1943	Western Local Escort Force North
HMCS Chicoutimi	Royal Canadian Navy	Flower-class corvette	4–8 January 1943	
HMCS Cobalt	Royal Canadian Navy	Flower-class corvette	7–12 January 1943	
HMCS Nanaimo	Royal Canadian Navy	Flower-class corvette	7–12 January 1943	Western Local Escort Force South
HMCS Quesnel	Royal Canadian Navy	Flower-class corvette	7–12 January 1943	

=== U-boats ===
==== Gruppe Spitz ====
Gruppe Spitz
Boat	Captain	Flag	Class	Notes
U-260	Hubertus Purkhold	Kriegsmarine	Type VIIC submarine	
U-662	Wolfgang Hermann	Kriegsmarine	Type VIIC submarine	
U-123	Horst von Schroeter	Kriegsmarine	Type IXB submarine	
U-659	Hans Stock	Kriegsmarine	Type VIIC submarine	
U-225	Wolfgang Leimkühler	Kriegsmarine	Type VIIC submarine	
U-406	Horst Dieterichs	Kriegsmarine	Type VIIC submarine	
U-440	Hans Geissler	Kriegsmarine	Type VIIC submarine	
U-203	Hermann Kottman	Kriegsmarine	Type VIIC submarine	
U-664	Adolf Graef	Kriegsmarine	Type VIIC submarine	
U-356	Günter Ruppelt	Kriegsmarine	Type VIIC submarine	Sunk 27 December

==== Gruppe Ungestüm ====
Gruppe Ungestüm
Name	Captain	Flag	Class	Notes
U-373	Paul-Karl Loeser	Kriegsmarine	Type VIIC submarine	
U-435	Siegfried Strelow	Kriegsmarine	Type VIIC submarine	
U-628	Heinz Hasenschar	Kriegsmarine	Type VIIC submarine	
U-336	Hans Hunger	Kriegsmarine	Type VIIC submarine	
U-591	HHans-Jürgen Zetzsche	Kriegsmarine	Type VIIC submarine	
U-615	Ralph Kapitzky	Kriegsmarine	Type VIIC submarine	
U-455	Hans-Martin Scheibe	Kriegsmarine	Type VIIC submarine	
U-409	hans-Ferdinand Massmann	Kriegsmarine	Type VIIC submarine	
U-441	Klaus Hartmann	Kriegsmarine	Type VIIC submarine	

=== Replenishment U-boats ===
U-tanker
Name	Captain	Flag	Class	Notes
U-117	Hans-Werner Neumann	Kriegsmarine	Type X submarine	Minelayer in use as a tanker

== See also ==
- Convoy Battles of World War II

== Bibliography ==
- Blair, Clay (2000) [1998]. Hitler's U-Boat War: The Hunted 1942–1945. Vol. II (pbk. repr. ed.). London: Cassell. ISBN 0-304-35261-6.
- Budiansky, S. (2000). Battle of Wits: The Complete Story of Codebreaking in World War II. New York: The Free Press (Simon & Schuster). ISBN 0-684-85932-7 – via Archive Foundation.
- Hague, Arnold (2000). The Allied Convoy System 1939–1945, Its Organisation, Defence and Operation. London: Chatham. ISBN 1-86176-147-3.
- Hinsley, F. H. (Harry); Thomas, E. E.; Ransom, C. F. G.; Knight, R. C. (1981). British Intelligence in the Second World War: Its Influence on Strategy and Operations. History of the Second World War. Vol. II. London: HMSO. ISBN 0-521-242908.
- Hinsley, F. H. (1994) [1993]. British Intelligence in the Second World War: Its Influence on Strategy and Operations. History of the Second World War, United Kingdom Military Series (2nd rev. abr. ed.). London: HMSO. ISBN 978-0-11-630961-7.
- Jordan, Roger W. (2006) [1999]. The World's Merchant Fleets 1939: The Particulars and Wartime Fates of 6,000 Ships (2nd ed.). London: Chatham/Lionel Leventhal. ISBN 978-1-86176-293-1.
- Kahn, D. (1973) [1967]. The Codebreakers: The Story of Secret Writing (10th abr. Signet, Chicago ed.). New York: Macmillan. LCCN 63-16109. OCLC 78083316.
- Kindell, Don. "ON Convoy Series: Convoy ON.154". Convoy Web: Arnold Hague Convoy Database.
- Lenton, H. T.; Colledge, J. J. (1968). British and Dominion Warships of World War Two. Garden City, NY: Doubleday and Company. OCLC 440734.
- Macksey, K. (2004) [2003]. The Searchers: Radio Intercept in two World Wars (Cassell Military Paperbacks ed.). London: Cassell. ISBN 978-0-304-36651-4.
- Milner, Marc (2018) [1985]. North Atlantic Run: The Royal Canadian Navy and the Battle for the Convoys. Toronto: University of Toronto Press. ISBN 978-1-4875-7728-5.
- Milner, Marc (2011) [2003]. Battle of the Atlantic. Stroud: Spellmount (History Press). ISBN 978-0-7524-6646-0.
- Mumford, J. Gordon (2009). "Battle of the Atlantic: Convoy ONS 154". Archive org. Archived from the original on 11 January 2011.
- Rohwer, Jürgen; Hümmelchen, Gerhard (2005) [1972]. Chronology of the War at Sea, 1939–1945: The Naval History of World War Two (3rd rev. ed.). London: Chatham. ISBN 978-1-86176-257-3.
- Ruegg, R.; Hague, A. (1993) [1992]. Convoys to Russia: Allied Convoys and Naval Surface Operations in Arctic Waters 1941–1945 (2nd rev. enl. ed.). Kendal: World Ship Society. ISBN 0-905617-66-5.
- Schull, Joseph (1987) [1950]. Far Distant Ships: An Official Account of Canadian Naval Operations in World War II. Toronto: Stoddart. ISBN 978-0-77-372160-9.
- Tarrant, V. E. (1989). The U-Boat Offensive 1914–1945. London: Arms and Armour. ISBN 1-85409-520-X.
- Woodman, Richard (2005) [2004]. The Real Cruel Sea: The Merchant Navy in the Battle of the Atlantic, 1939–1943 (Pbk. ed.). London: John Murray. ISBN 0-7195-6599-5.
