= USS Bancroft (DD-256) =

Clemson-class destroyer

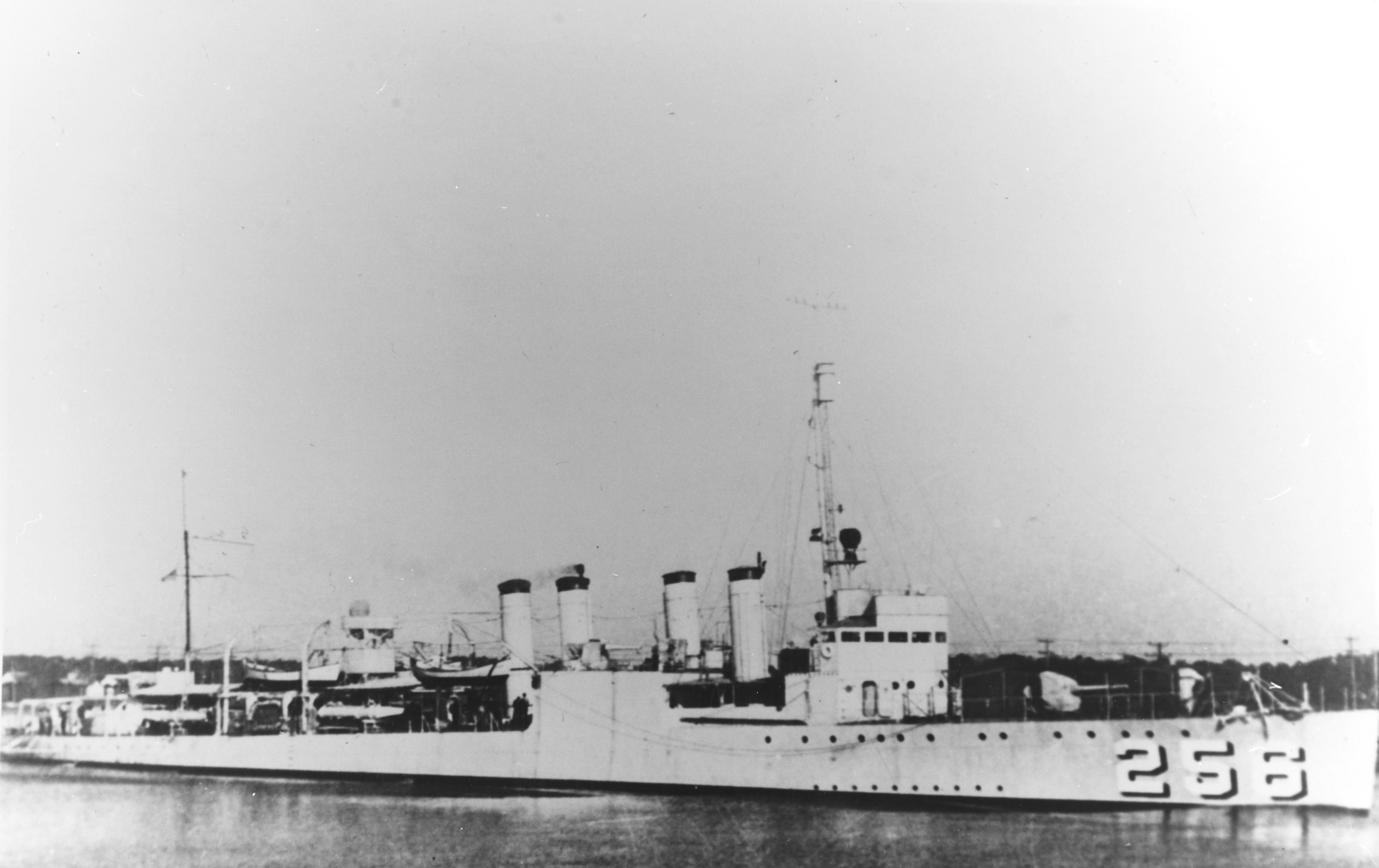
- USS Bancroft (DD-256) underway circa 1940

History

United States
- Name: USS Bancroft
- Namesake: George Bancroft
- Builder: Bethlehem Shipbuilding Corporation, Fore River Shipyard, Quincy
- Cost: $1,218,962.89 (hull and machinery)
- Laid down: 4 November 1918
- Launched: 21 March 1919
- Commissioned: 30 June 1919
- Decommissioned: 24 September 1940
- Stricken: 8 January 1941
- Identification: Hull number DD-256
- Fate: Transferred to Canada, 24 September 1940

Canada
- Name: HMCS St. Francis
- Namesake: St. Francis River
- Commissioned: 24 September 1940
- Decommissioned: 1945
- Identification: Pennant number I93
- Honours and awards: Atlantic 1941–43
- Fate: Declared surplus, 1 April 1945; sank off Cape Cod en route to scrapping, July 1945

General characteristics
- Class & type: Clemson-class destroyer
- Displacement: 1,216 long tons (1,236 t)
- Length: 314 ft 4 in (95.81 m)
- Beam: 31 ft 8 in (9.65 m)
- Draft: 9 ft 10 in (3.00 m)
- Propulsion: 26,500 shp (19,800 kW); Geared turbines, 2 screws
- Speed: 35 knots (65 km/h; 40 mph)
- Range: 4,900 nmi (9,100 km; 5,600 mi) at 15 knots (28 km/h; 17 mph)
- Complement: 122
- Armament: 4 × 4"/50 caliber gun; 1 × 3"/23 caliber gun; 12 × 21 in (533 mm) torpedo tubes

The second USS Bancroft (DD-256) was a Clemson-class destroyer in the United States Navy, which briefly served in 1919. Placed in reserve, the ship lay idle before being reactivated for World War II. She was transferred to the Royal Canadian Navy in 1940, where she served as HMCS St. Francis (I93) in the Battle of the Atlantic escorting convoys. The ship was declared surplus in April 1945, sold for scrap and sank on the way to the breakers after a collision in July.

== Construction and career ==
=== United States Navy service ===
Named for George Bancroft, an American historian and diplomat, the destroyer was launched on 21 March 1919 by Bethlehem Shipbuilding Corporation's Fore River Shipyard in Quincy, Massachusetts, sponsored by Miss Mary W. Bancroft, great granddaughter of George Bancroft. The ship was commissioned on 30 June 1919.

Bancroft joined the Atlantic Fleet and took part in fleet training activities until 26 November 1919 when the ship went into reserve commission. The destroyer was placed out of commission at Philadelphia on 11 July 1922. Bancroft was recommissioned 18 December 1939 and served with the Atlantic Squadron on the east coast until decommissioned at Halifax, Nova Scotia. She was then transferred to Great Britain in the destroyer-land bases exchange on 24 September 1940.

=== Royal Canadian Navy service ===
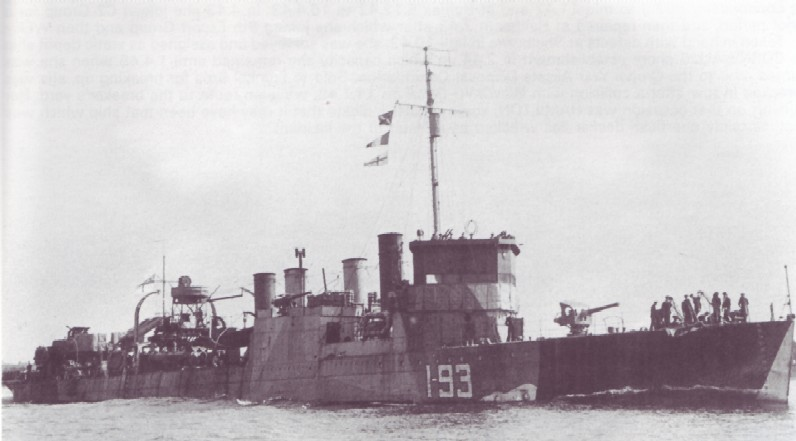
As HMCS St. Francis, 1940–1945

Bancroft was allocated to the Royal Canadian Navy and was taken over by the Canadians on 24 September 1940. Following the Canadian practice of naming destroyers after Canadian rivers (but with deference to the U.S. origin), the destroyer was renamed HMCS St. Francis after the St. Francis River forming the border between northern Maine and Quebec and New Brunswick. St. Francis left Halifax 15 January 1941 and arrived in the River Clyde, Scotland, 26 January. She joined the 4th Escort Group and on 20 May she rescued all the survivors of the steamship Starcrose which had to be sunk after being torpedoed by a submarine. At the end of June she escorted a troop convoy to the Middle East and in July she joined the newly formed Newfoundland Escort Force. Between 1941 and 1943 St. Francis made several attacks on enemy submarines while escorting convoys ON 95, SC 85, ON 105, HX 197, and ON 116 with Mid-Ocean Escort Force group C-4. St. Francis subsequently escorted convoy ON 121 with Escort Group C-3, convoy SC 99 with Escort Group C-1, and convoy ON 147 with Escort Group C-4.

After refitting at Halifax, St. Francis joined Escort Group C2 in the Western Approaches Command in June 1943 but in August was transferred to the 9th Escort Group (RCN), working from Londonderry Port, Northern Ireland. She was reassigned to the Western Local Escort Force at Halifax the following month. From early 1944 she was employed on training duties at Digby, Nova Scotia, where on 1 April 1945 she was declared surplus.

On 14 July 1945, the destroyer was under tow of the tug Peter Norman, and bound for Baltimore to be broken up for scrap by the Boston Iron & Metal Co.. After passing through the Cape Cod Canal, the vessels encountered a thick fog, which enshrouded Buzzards Bay. Near the entrance to the bay the collier Windward Gulf collided with the old destroyer opening a hole in its hull. Peter Norman tried to ground the destroyer, but it was taking on water too quickly and soon sank on an even keel in 60 feet (18 m) of water approximately two miles (3.2 km) off Acoaxet with no loss of life.

=== Trans-Atlantic convoys escorted ===
Convoy	Escort Group	Dates	Notes
SC 49		14–21 Oct 1941	Newfoundland to Iceland
SC 55		19–25 Nov 1941	Newfoundland to Iceland
SC 71		27 Feb – 9 March 1942	Newfoundland to Northern Ireland
ON 76		16–23 March 1942	Northern Ireland to Newfoundland
SC 78		9–16 April 1942	Newfoundland to Northern Ireland
ON 90		5–9 May 1942	Northern Ireland to Newfoundland
SC 85	MOEF group C4	31 May – 12 June 1942	Newfoundland to Northern Ireland
ON 105	MOEF group C4	20–27 June 1942	Northern Ireland to Newfoundland
HX 197	MOEF group C4	9–16 July 1942	Newfoundland to Northern Ireland
ON 116	MOEF group C4	26 July – 1 Aug 1942	Northern Ireland to Newfoundland
ON 121	MOEF group C3	20–22 Aug 1942	Iceland to Newfoundland
SC 99	MOEF group C1	9–19 Sept 1942	Newfoundland to Northern Ireland
ON 147	MOEF group C4	20–23 Nov 1942	Northern Ireland to Newfoundland
ON 146	MOEF group B3	29 Nov – 5 Dec 1942	Northern Ireland to Newfoundland
SC 127	WLEF	16–20 April 1943	Halifax to Newfoundland
ONS 4	WLEF	29 April – 5 May 1943	Newfoundland to Halifax
HX 240	WLEF	21–25 May 1943	Halifax to Newfoundland
HX 242	MOEF group C2	6–14 June 1943	Newfoundland to Northern Ireland
ON 190	MOEF group C2	25 June – 1 July 1943	Northern Ireland to Newfoundland
ONS 19	9th escort group	27 Sept – 9 Oct 1943	
