= German submarine U-260 =

German World War II submarine

History

Nazi Germany
- Name: U-260
- Ordered: 23 December 1939
- Builder: Bremer Vulkan, Bremen-Vegesack
- Yard number: 25
- Laid down: 7 May 1941
- Launched: 9 February 1942
- Commissioned: 14 March 1942
- Fate: Scuttled, 12 March 1945

General characteristics
- Class & type: Type VIIC submarine
- Displacement: 769 tonnes (757 long tons) surfaced; 871 t (857 long tons) submerged
- Length: 67.10 m (220 ft 2 in) o/a; 50.50 m (165 ft 8 in) pressure hull
- Beam: 6.20 m (20 ft 4 in) o/a; 4.70 m (15 ft 5 in) pressure hull
- Height: 9.60 m (31 ft 6 in)
- Draught: 4.74 m (15 ft 7 in)
- Installed power: 2,800–3,200 PS (2,100–2,400 kW; 2,800–3,200 bhp) (diesels); 750 PS (550 kW; 740 shp) (electric)
- Propulsion: 2 shafts; 2 × diesel engines; 2 × electric motors
- Speed: 17.7 knots (32.8 km/h; 20.4 mph) surfaced; 7.6 knots (14.1 km/h; 8.7 mph) submerged
- Range: 8,500 nmi (15,700 km; 9,800 mi) at 10 knots (19 km/h; 12 mph) surfaced; 80 nmi (150 km; 92 mi) at 4 knots (7.4 km/h; 4.6 mph) submerged
- Test depth: 230 m (750 ft); Crush depth: 250–295 m (820–968 ft)
- Complement: 4 officers, 40–56 enlisted
- Armament: 5 × 53.3 cm (21 in) torpedo tubes (four bow, one stern); 14 × torpedoes or 26 TMA mines; 1 × 8.8 cm (3.46 in) deck gun (220 rounds); 1 × 2 cm (0.79 in) C/30 anti-aircraft gun

Service record
- Part of: 8th U-boat Flotilla; 14 March – 30 September 1942; 6th U-boat Flotilla; 1 October 1942 – 31 October 1944; 33rd U-boat Flotilla; 1 November 1944 – 12 March 1945
- Identification codes: M 44 273
- Commanders: Oblt.z.S. / Kptlt. Hubertus Purkhold; 14 March 1942 – April 1944; Oblt.z.S. Klaus Becker; April 1944 – 12 March 1945
- Operations: 1st patrol: 10 September – 15 November 1942; 2nd patrol: 14 December 1942 – 3 February 1943; 3rd patrol: 12 March – 22 May 1943; 4th patrol: 25 August – 24 October 1943; 5th patrol: 18 December 1943 – 27 February 1944; 6th patrol: a. 6 – 16 June 1944; b. 22 – 23 July 1944; 7th patrol: 7 – 13 August 1944; 8th patrol: a. 3 September – 17 October 1944; b. 19 – 25 October 1944; c. 9 – 13 February 1945; 9th patrol: 18 February – 12 March 1945
- Victories: 1 merchant ship sunk (4,893 GRT)

German submarine U-260 was a Type VIIC U-boat built for Nazi Germany's Kriegsmarine for service during World War II. Her keel was laid down 7 May 1941 by Bremer Vulkan, of Bremen-Vegesack. She was commissioned 14 March 1942 with Kapitänleutnant Herbertus Purkhold in command.

== Design ==
German Type VIIC submarines were preceded by the shorter Type VIIB submarines. U-260 had a displacement of 769 tonnes (757 long tons) when at the surface and 871 tonnes (857 long tons) while submerged. She had a total length of 67.10 m (220 ft 2 in), a pressure hull length of 50.50 m (165 ft 8 in), a beam of 6.20 m (20 ft 4 in), a height of 9.60 m (31 ft 6 in), and a draught of 4.74 m (15 ft 7 in). The submarine was powered by two Germaniawerft F46 four-stroke, six-cylinder supercharged diesel engines producing a total of 2,800 to 3,200 metric horsepower (2,060 to 2,350 kW; 2,760 to 3,160 shp) for use while surfaced, two AEG GU 460/8–27 double-acting electric motors producing a total of 750 metric horsepower (550 kW; 740 shp) for use while submerged. She had two shafts and two 1.23 m (4 ft) propellers. The boat was capable of operating at depths of up to 230 metres (750 ft).

The submarine had a maximum surface speed of 17.7 knots (32.8 km/h; 20.4 mph) and a maximum submerged speed of 7.6 knots (14.1 km/h; 8.7 mph). When submerged, the boat could operate for 80 nautical miles (150 km; 92 mi) at 4 knots (7.4 km/h; 4.6 mph); when surfaced, she could travel 8,500 nautical miles (15,700 km; 9,800 mi) at 10 knots (19 km/h; 12 mph). U-260 was fitted with five 53.3 cm (21 in) torpedo tubes (four fitted at the bow and one at the stern), fourteen torpedoes, one 8.8 cm (3.46 in) SK C/35 naval gun, 220 rounds, and one 2 cm (0.79 in) C/30 anti-aircraft gun. The boat had a complement of between forty-four and sixty.

== Service history ==
U-260 conducted nine patrols in total. On her second, U-260 was part of Spitz wolfpack which attacked Convoy ON 154, making contact with the convoy on 28 December 1942, and sinking the 4,893 GRT British freighter Empire Wagtail (lost with all hands – 43 dead). This was the only ship sunk by U-260.

Purkhold was relieved in April 1944 by Oberleutnant zur See Klaus Becker. Becker commanded the boat until March 1945.

On 12 March 1945, U-260 was scuttled south of neutral Ireland, in position 51°15′N 09°05′W, after sustaining mine damage. The minefield had been laid by HMS Apollo, an Abdiel-class minelayer. U-260's crew of five officers and 48 crew were interned in Ireland for the remainder of the war.

After the sinking, a sealed container of papers floated to the surface. A British expert flew to Cork to examine them.

In her entire career, U-260 suffered no casualties to her crew.

=== Wolfpacks ===
U-260 took part in 16 wolfpacks, namely:

- Blitz (22 – 26 September 1942)
- Tiger (26 – 30 September 1942)
- Luchs (1 – 6 October 1942)
- Panther (6 – 11 October 1942)
- Südwärts (24 – 26 October 1942)
- Spitz (22 – 31 December 1942)
- Seeteufel (21 – 30 March 1943)
- Löwenherz (1 – 10 April 1943)
- Lerche (10 – 15 April 1943)
- Specht (21 April – 4 May 1943)
- Fink (4 – 6 May 1943)
- Leuthen (15 – 24 September 1943)
- Rossbach (24 September – 7 October 1943)
- Rügen 6 (28 December 1943 – 2 January 1944)
- Rügen 5 (2 – 7 January 1944)
- Rügen (7 – 11 January 1944)

== Post war ==
The wreck site of U-260 was discovered in 1975 by local fisherman Colin Barnes after snagging nets, although it was presumed that the wreck of Counsellor (sunk due to a mine in 1917) was in the area. A friend of Mr Barnes, Joe Barry, dived on the noted position and discovered the U-boat rather than the expected cargo ship.

U-260 currently lies in about 40–45 metres (131–148 ft) of water approximately seven kilometres south of Glandore, and is a popular scuba diving site from Baltimore, County Cork, and Union Hall, Ireland.

There is recent speculation that U-260 did not actually strike a mine, but instead struck an underwater pinnacle (now known as '78 Rock' but which was uncharted at the time) leading to its damaged state.

On 2 July 2014, two experienced divers died whilst exploring the wreck. The divers had deviated from their dive plan for the decompression dive by staying down too long, and ascended too quickly from the wreck. Both men were ruled to have died due to complications from the bends. The body of one diver was immediately recovered, and the body of the second diver was recovered later that afternoon.

== Summary of raiding history ==
Date	Ship Name	Nationality	Tonnage (GRT)	Fate
28 December 1942	Empire Wagtail	United Kingdom	4,893	Sunk

== Bibliography ==
- Busch, Rainer; Röll, Hans-Joachim (1999). German U-boat commanders of World War II : a biographical dictionary. Translated by Brooks, Geoffrey. London, Annapolis, Md: Greenhill Books, Naval Institute Press. ISBN 1-55750-186-6.
- Edwards, Bernard (1996). Dönitz and the Wolf Packs – The U-boats at War. Cassell Military Classics. pp. 136, 137, 176, 217. ISBN 0-304-35203-9.
- Gröner, Erich; Jung, Dieter; Maass, Martin (1991). U-boats and Mine Warfare Vessels. German Warships 1815–1945. Vol. 2. Translated by Thomas, Keith; Magowan, Rachel. London: Conway Maritime Press. ISBN 0-85177-593-4.
- Hague, Arnold (2000). The Allied Convoy System 1939–1945. Naval Institute Press. ISBN 1-55750-019-3.
- Rohwer, J.; Hummelchen, G. (1992). Chronology of the War at Sea 1939–1945. Naval Institute Press. ISBN 1-55750-105-X.
- Kemp, Paul (1999). U-Boats Destroyed – German Submarine Losses in the World Wars. London: Arms & Armour. ISBN 1-85409-515-3.
