= German submarine U-662 =

German World War II submarine

History

Nazi Germany
- Name: U-662
- Ordered: 9 October 1939
- Builder: Deutsche Werft, Hamburg
- Yard number: 811
- Laid down: 7 May 1941
- Launched: 22 January 1942
- Commissioned: 9 April 1942
- Fate: Sunk on 21 July 1943

General characteristics
- Class & type: Type VIIC submarine
- Displacement: 769 tonnes (757 long tons) surfaced; 871 t (857 long tons) submerged
- Length: 67.10 m (220 ft 2 in) o/a; 50.50 m (165 ft 8 in) pressure hull
- Beam: 6.20 m (20 ft 4 in) o/a; 4.70 m (15 ft 5 in) pressure hull
- Height: 9.60 m (31 ft 6 in)
- Draught: 4.74 m (15 ft 7 in)
- Installed power: 2,800–3,200 PS (2,100–2,400 kW; 2,800–3,200 bhp) (diesels); 750 PS (550 kW; 740 shp) (electric)
- Propulsion: 2 shafts; 2 × diesel engines; 2 × electric motors
- Speed: 17.7 knots (32.8 km/h; 20.4 mph) surfaced; 7.6 knots (14.1 km/h; 8.7 mph) submerged
- Range: 8,500 nmi (15,700 km; 9,800 mi) at 10 knots (19 km/h; 12 mph) surfaced; 80 nmi (150 km; 92 mi) at 4 knots (7.4 km/h; 4.6 mph) submerged
- Test depth: 230 m (750 ft); Crush depth: 250–295 m (820–968 ft)
- Complement: 4 officers, 40–56 enlisted
- Armament: 5 × 53.3 cm (21 in) torpedo tubes (four bow, one stern); 14 × torpedoes; 1 × 8.8 cm (3.46 in) deck gun (220 rounds); 1 x 2 cm (0.79 in) C/30 AA gun

Service record
- Part of: 5th U-boat Flotilla; 9 April – 30 September 1942; 7th U-boat Flotilla; 1 October 1942 – 21 July 1943
- Identification codes: M 43 109
- Commanders: Kptlt. / K.Kapt. Wolfgang Hermann; 9 April 1942 – 14 February 1943; Oblt.z.S. / Kptlt. Heinz-Eberhard Müller; 10 March – 21 July 1943
- Operations: 4 patrols: 1st patrol: 22 September – 18 November 1942; 2nd patrol: 19 December 1942 – 7 February 1943; 3rd patrol: 23 March – 19 May 1943; 4th patrol: 26 June – 21 July 1943
- Victories: 3 merchant ships sunk (18,609 GRT); 1 merchant ship damaged (7,174 GRT)

U-662 21-7-43

German submarine U-662 was a Type VIIC U-boat built for Nazi Germany's Kriegsmarine for service during World War II. She was laid down on 7 May 1941 by Deutsche Werft, Hamburg as yard number 811, launched on 22 January 1942 and commissioned on 9 April 1942 under Kapitänleutnant Wolfgang Hermann.

== Design ==
German Type VIIC submarines were preceded by the shorter Type VIIB submarines. U-662 had a displacement of 769 tonnes (757 long tons) when at the surface and 871 tonnes (857 long tons) while submerged. She had a total length of 67.10 m (220 ft 2 in), a pressure hull length of 50.50 m (165 ft 8 in), a beam of 6.20 m (20 ft 4 in), a height of 9.60 m (31 ft 6 in), and a draught of 4.74 m (15 ft 7 in). The submarine was powered by two Germaniawerft F46 four-stroke, six-cylinder supercharged diesel engines producing a total of 2,800 to 3,200 metric horsepower (2,060 to 2,350 kW; 2,760 to 3,160 shp) for use while surfaced, two Siemens-Schuckert GU 343/38–8 double-acting electric motors producing a total of 750 metric horsepower (550 kW; 740 shp) for use while submerged. She had two shafts and two 1.23 m (4 ft) propellers. The boat was capable of operating at depths of up to 230 metres (750 ft).

The submarine had a maximum surface speed of 17.7 knots (32.8 km/h; 20.4 mph) and a maximum submerged speed of 7.6 knots (14.1 km/h; 8.7 mph). When submerged, the boat could operate for 80 nautical miles (150 km; 92 mi) at 4 knots (7.4 km/h; 4.6 mph); when surfaced, she could travel 8,500 nautical miles (15,700 km; 9,800 mi) at 10 knots (19 km/h; 12 mph). U-662 was fitted with five 53.3 cm (21 in) torpedo tubes (four fitted at the bow and one at the stern), fourteen torpedoes, one 8.8 cm (3.46 in) SK C/35 naval gun, 220 rounds, and a 2 cm (0.79 in) C/30 anti-aircraft gun. The boat had a complement of between forty-four and sixty.

== Service history ==
The boat's career began with training at 5th U-boat Flotilla on 9 April 1942, followed by active service on 1 October 1942 as part of the 7th Flotilla for the remainder of her service.

In 4 patrols she sank 3 merchant ships, for a total of 18,609 gross register tons (GRT) and damaged one merchant ship.

=== Wolfpacks ===
U-662 took part in eleven wolfpacks, namely:

- Panther (6 – 12 October 1942)
- Leopard (12 – 19 October 1942)
- Südwärts (24 – 26 October 1942)
- Delphin (4 – 5 November 1942)
- Spitz (22 – 31 December 1942)
- Jaguar (18 – 31 January 1943)
- Without name (27 – 30 March 1943)
- Adler (7 – 13 April 1943)
- Meise (13 – 22 April 1943)
- Specht (22 April – 4 May 1943)
- Fink (4 – 6 May 1943)

=== Convoy ONS 154 ===
On the night on 26 December 1942 U-662 reported sighting Convoy ONS 154.

U-662 sunk the crippled and straggling Ville de Rouen which had been attacked earlier by U-225.

=== July 1943 ===
On 19 July a US Liberator bomber dropped four depth charges, but broke off the attack after sustaining flak damage. U-662 escaped undamaged.
The next day, U-662 was again attacked by US aircraft, this time a Douglas B-18 Bolo aircraft, but again she escaped undamaged. She was sunk the following day.

=== Fate ===
U-662 was sunk on 21 July 1943 in the North Atlantic in position 03°56′N 48°46′W, by depth charges from US Catalina from Patrol Squadron VP-94. Apart from the commander and two other crew members, all hands were lost.

Oberleutnant zur See Heinz-Eberhard Müller was so severely injured that he was repatriated to Germany in March 1944 as he was no longer fit for combat.

"On 21 July 1943 he was attacked for an hour by Lt. Stan Auslander, USN, in a PBY and then was sent to the bottom by another Catalina piloted by Ltjg. R. H. Howland USNR. MUELLER HAD BOTH ARMES AND ONE LEG BROKEN AND INTERNAL INJURIES. He was kept afloat and alive by his chief mate, one Horst Gaertner. Gaertner swam around with Mueller in his arms for seven days, until they were picked up by a patrol craft."

== Summary of raiding history ==
Date	Ship Name	Nationality	Tonnage (GRT)	Fate
29 December 1942	Ville de Rouen	United Kingdom	5,598	Sunk
29 March 1943	Empire Whale	United Kingdom	6,159	Sunk
29 March 1943	Ocean Viceroy	United Kingdom	7,174	Damaged
29 March 1943	Umaria	United Kingdom	6,852	Sunk

== Bibliography ==
- Busch, Rainer; Röll, Hans-Joachim (1999). German U-boat commanders of World War II : a biographical dictionary. Translated by Brooks, Geoffrey. London, Annapolis, Md: Greenhill Books, Naval Institute Press. ISBN 1-55750-186-6.
- Busch, Rainer; Röll, Hans-Joachim (1999). Der U-Boot-Krieg, 1939-1945: Deutsche U-Boot-Verluste von September 1939 bis Mai 1945 [German U-boat losses from September 1939 to May 1945] (in German). Vol. IV. Hamburg, Berlin, Bonn: Mittler. ISBN 3-8132-0514-2.
- Edwards, Bernard (1996). Dönitz and the Wolf Packs - The U-boats at War. p. 138. ISBN 0-304-35203-9.
- Gröner, Eric; Jung, Dieter; Maass, Martin (1991). German Warships 1815-1945: U-boats and Mine Warfare Vessels. Vol. 2. Translated by Thomas, Keith; Magowan, Rachel. London: Conway Maritime Press. ISBN 0-85177-593-4.
- Sharpe, Peter (1998). U-Boat Fact File. Great Britain: Midland Publishing. ISBN 1-85780-072-9.
