= German submarine U-356 =

German World War II submarine

History

Nazi Germany
- Name: U-356
- Ordered: 26 October 1939
- Builder: Flensburger Schiffbau-Gesellschaft, Flensburg
- Yard number: 475
- Laid down: 4 May 1940
- Launched: 16 September 1941
- Commissioned: 20 December 1941
- Fate: Sunk, 27 December 1942

General characteristics
- Class & type: Type VIIC submarine
- Displacement: 769 tonnes (757 long tons) surfaced; 871 t (857 long tons) submerged
- Length: 67.10 m (220 ft 2 in) o/a; 50.50 m (165 ft 8 in) pressure hull
- Beam: 6.20 m (20 ft 4 in) o/a; 4.70 m (15 ft 5 in) pressure hull
- Height: 9.60 m (31 ft 6 in)
- Draught: 4.74 m (15 ft 7 in)
- Installed power: 2,800–3,200 PS (2,100–2,400 kW; 2,800–3,200 bhp) (diesels); 750 PS (550 kW; 740 shp) (electric)
- Propulsion: 2 shafts; 2 × diesel engines; 2 × electric motors
- Speed: 17.7 knots (32.8 km/h; 20.4 mph) surfaced; 7.6 knots (14.1 km/h; 8.7 mph) submerged
- Range: 8,500 nmi (15,700 km; 9,800 mi) at 10 knots (19 km/h; 12 mph) surfaced; 80 nmi (150 km; 92 mi) at 4 knots (7.4 km/h; 4.6 mph) submerged
- Test depth: 230 m (750 ft); Crush depth: 250–295 m (820–968 ft)
- Complement: 4 officers, 40–56 enlisted
- Armament: 5 × 53.3 cm (21 in) torpedo tubes (four bow, one stern); 14 × torpedoes or 26 TMA mines; 1 × 8.8 cm (3.46 in) deck gun(220 rounds); 1 x 2 cm (0.79 in) C/30 AA gun

Service record
- Part of: 6th U-boat Flotilla; 20 December 1941 – 27 December 1942
- Identification codes: M 47 956
- Commanders: Kptlt. Georg Wallas; 20 December 1941 – 2 December 1942; Oblt.z.S. Günther Ruppelt; 3–27 December 1942
- Operations: 2 patrols: 1st patrol: 3 September – 4 November 1942; 2nd patrol: 5 – 27 December 1942
- Victories: 3 merchant ships sunk (13,649 GRT); 1 merchant ship damaged (7,051 GRT)

German submarine U-356 was a Type VIIC U-boat of Nazi Germany's Kriegsmarine during World War II. The submarine was laid down in May 1940 at the Flensburger Schiffbau-Gesellschaft yard at Flensburg, launched on 16 September 1941, and commissioned on 20 December 1941.

== Design ==
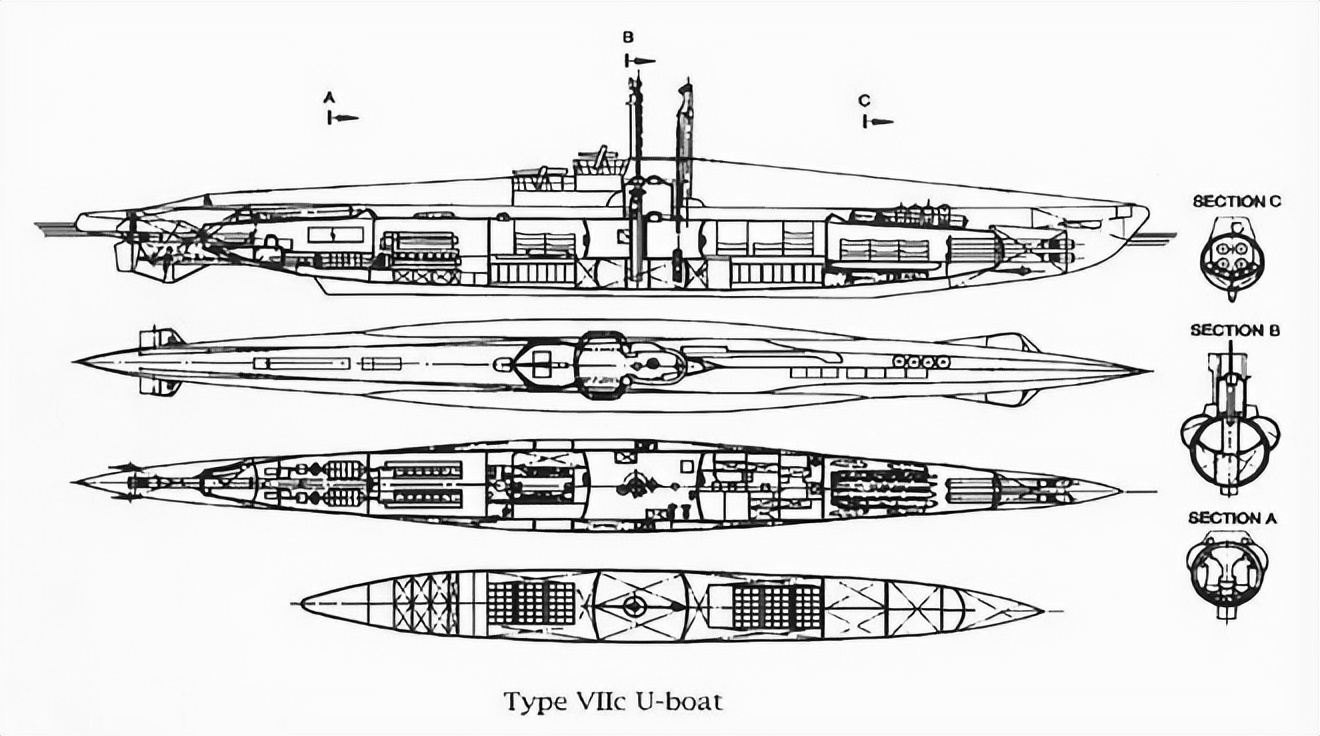
A cross-section of a Type VIIC submarine

German Type VIIC submarines were preceded by the shorter Type VIIB submarines. U-356 had a displacement of 769 tonnes (757 long tons) when at the surface and 871 tonnes (857 long tons) while submerged. She had a total length of 67.10 m (220 ft 2 in), a pressure hull length of 50.50 m (165 ft 8 in), a beam of 6.20 m (20 ft 4 in), a height of 9.60 m (31 ft 6 in), and a draught of 4.74 m (15 ft 7 in). The submarine was powered by two Germaniawerft F46 four-stroke, six-cylinder supercharged diesel engines producing a total of 2,800 to 3,200 metric horsepower (2,060 to 2,350 kW; 2,760 to 3,160 shp) for use while surfaced, two AEG GU 460/8-276 double-acting electric motors producing a total of 750 metric horsepower (550 kW; 740 shp) for use while submerged. She had two shafts and two 1.23 m (4 ft) propellers. The boat was capable of operating at depths of up to 230 metres (750 ft).

The submarine had a maximum surface speed of 17.7 knots (32.8 km/h; 20.4 mph) and a maximum submerged speed of 7.6 knots (14.1 km/h; 8.7 mph). When submerged, the boat could operate for 80 nautical miles (150 km; 92 mi) at 4 knots (7.4 km/h; 4.6 mph); when surfaced, she could travel 8,500 nautical miles (15,700 km; 9,800 mi) at 10 knots (19 km/h; 12 mph). U-356 was fitted with five 53.3 cm (21 in) torpedo tubes (four fitted at the bow and one at the stern), fourteen torpedoes, one 8.8 cm (3.46 in) SK C/35 naval gun, 220 rounds, and a 2 cm (0.79 in) C/30 anti-aircraft gun. The boat had a complement of between forty-four and sixty.

== Service history ==
U-356 was ordered by the Kriegsmarine on 26 October 1939. She was laid down about six months later at the Flensburger Schiffbau-Gesellschaft yard at Flensburg, on 4 May 1940. The next year, U-356 was launched on 16 September 1941. She was formally commissioned on 20 December 1941.

== Loss ==
U-356 was attacked by HMCS St. Laurent. Commander at this date was LCdr Guy Stanley Windeyer, DSC RCN - 14 Nov 1942 – 19 Jan 1943, HMCS Chilliwack, HMCS Battleford and HMCS Napanee north of the Azores at 45°30′N 25°40′W on 27 December 1942 and sunk by depth charges. All 46 crew members died in the event. Source: For Posterity's Sake, a Royal Canadian Navy Historical Project

== Wolfpacks ==
U-356 took part in six wolfpacks, namely:

- Pfeil (12 – 22 September 1942)
- Blitz (22 – 26 September 1942)
- Tiger (26 – 30 September 1942)
- Wotan (5 – 19 October 1942)
- Raufbold (11 – 22 December 1942)
- Spitz (22 – 27 December 1942)

== Summary of Raiding History ==
Date	Ship Name	Nationality	Tonnage (GRT)	Convoy	Fate
27 December 1942	Empire Union	United Kingdom	5,952	ONS 154	Sunk
27 December 1942	Melrose Abbey	United Kingdom	2,473	ONS 154	Sunk
27 December 1942	Soekaboemi	Netherlands	7,051	ONS 154	Damaged
27 December 1942	King Edward	United Kingdom	5,224	ONS 154	Sunk
Total:			20,700		

== Bibliography ==
- Busch, Rainer; Röll, Hans-Joachim (1999). German U-boat commanders of World War II : a biographical dictionary. Translated by Brooks, Geoffrey. London, Annapolis, Md: Greenhill Books, Naval Institute Press. ISBN 1-55750-186-6.
- Busch, Rainer; Röll, Hans-Joachim (1999). Der U-Boot-Krieg, 1939-1945: Deutsche U-Boot-Verluste von September 1939 bis Mai 1945 [German U-boat losses from September 1939 to May 1945] (in German). Vol. IV. Hamburg, Berlin, Bonn: Mittler. ISBN 3-8132-0514-2.
- Gröner, Erich; Jung, Dieter; Maass, Martin (1991). U-boats and Mine Warfare Vessels. German Warships 1815–1945. Vol. 2. Translated by Thomas, Keith; Magowan, Rachel. London: Conway Maritime Press. ISBN 0-85177-593-4.
