= ON/ONS convoys =

The ON and later ONS convoys were a series of North Atlantic trade convoys running Outbound from the British Isles to North America during the Atlantic campaign of the Second World War. The ON convoys replaced the earlier OA/OB series of outbound convoys in July 1941 and ran until the end of the campaign in May 1945. They were organized as alternating fast and slow convoys until March 1943, when the ONS series was begun to take over the slow trans-Atlantic traffic, after which all in the ON series were fast.

== ON convoys ==
From 7 September 1939, shortly after the outbreak of the Second World War, all traffic outbound from Britain was organized into the OA and OB series, sailing from London via the English Channel (OA) and from Liverpool via St Georges Channel (OB) into the South-Western Approaches. These would be escorted until beyond the range of U-boat patrols before the ships dispersed to reach their destinations. After the fall of France in June 1940 these were successively reorganized as German aircraft, submarines and surface ships reached further and further into the Atlantic, until ships formerly assigned to OA/OB convoys were formed into ON convoys sailing from Liverpool via the North Channel and escorted all the way to Halifax Harbour. These convoys were sequentially numbered from ON 1 sailing on 26 July 1941 to ON 305 sailing on 27 May 1945.

From August 1942, the Mid-Ocean Escort Force of British and Canadian ships (with a few United States Coast Guard cutters) delivered ON convoys to the Royal Canadian Navy Western Local Escort Force (WLEF) off Halifax; and the WLEF escorted most convoys from ON 125 through ON 301 to New York City.

Most ships in ON convoys were in ballast, although some carried coal or other export goods. A total of 14,864 ships sailed in 307 ON convoys. One ON convoy sailed in Fast and Slow sections and two others were cancelled. U-boats sank 81 of these ships, and another 23 were lost to marine accidents. These figures do not include stragglers; although the majority of casualties to U-boats were ships that had fallen out of convoys or were sailing independently. Ten warships on escort duty were also lost.

== ONS convoys ==
Until April 1943, ships capable of speeds between 9 and 13 knots (17 and 24 km/h; 10 and 15 mph) were assigned to odd-numbered (fast) convoys—sometimes designated ON(F); while ships capable of speeds between 6 and 9 knots (11 and 17 km/h; 6.9 and 10.4 mph) were assigned to even-numbered (slow) convoys—sometimes designated ON(S) or (ambiguously) ONS. This situation, which has proved confusing to modern historians, prevailed until a new and separate series of ONS (Outbound North Slow) convoys was organised. These convoys were sequentially numbered from ONS 1 sailing on 4 April 1943 to ONS 51 sailing on 21 May 1945. ON 171 was a fast convoy, as were all subsequent ON convoys. The ONS series were suspended in the summer of 1944 as escort groups were diverted to cover the Normandy landings. A total of 1873 ships sailed in 51 ONS convoys. Only 5 of these were attacked (around 10%), though two of these battles were of major significance; ONS 5 is regarded as the turning point of the campaign, while ONS 20 was the last major convoy battle in the campaign. Nineteen ships were lost (around 1 per cent) from ONS convoys.

== Notable battles around ON and ONS convoys ==
The Outbound Northern convoys saw some of the major convoy battles of the Atlantic campaign; of the 40 convoys which lost 6 or more ships, 8 were in the ON series (of which 5 were Slow, and 3 were Fast) and one was in the ONS series.

- Convoy ON 67 was one of the few North Atlantic trade convoy of early 1942 to be attacked by multiple U-boats. Eight ships were sunk, and one U-boat damaged, over a four day battle
- Convoy ON 92 lost seven ships over a three-day period
- Convoy ON 122 was the first to illustrate the defensive value of HF/DF and type 271 centimeter-wavelength radar.
- Convoy ON 127 was the only North Atlantic trade convoy of 1942 or 1943 where all U-boats deployed against the convoy launched torpedoes.
- Convoy ON 144 demonstrated the ability of Flower-class corvettes equipped with type 271 centimetre-wavelength radar.
- Convoy ON 154 Loss of 486 lives with 14 ships during the "Christmas Convoy" of December 1942 caused re-evaluation of Canadian convoy escorts.
- Convoy ON 166. Attacked in late February, 1943, ON 166 lost 13 merchant ships and the Convoy rescue ship Stockport. Three U-boats were destroyed and the USCG Treasury-class cutter leading Escort Group A-3 was disabled.
- Convoy ONS 5. Attacked in April–May 1943, ONS 5 saw the loss of 12 ships, and the destruction of 6 U-boats, in a week-long series of actions. It ushered in the period known as Black May and is widely regarded as the turning point in the Atlantic campaign.
- Convoys ONS 18/ON 202. Attacked in September 1943, these two convoys saw the loss of 6 ships and 3 escorts, for the destruction of 3 U-boats, in the first battle of the Kriegsmarine's autumn offensive after Black May.
- Convoy ONS 19: In September 1943 the forces escorting this ONS 19 destroyed three U-boats encountered in Mid-Atlantic. The convoy was not attacked and no ships were lost.
- Convoys ONS 20/ON 206: Attacked in October 1943, six U-boats were destroyed while one merchant ship was sunk

== See also ==
- CU convoys
- Gibraltar convoys of World War II
- HX convoys
- SC convoys
