= Convoy SC 100 =

Convoy during naval battles of the Second World War

- Part of World War II
Date	12–28 September 1942
Location	North Atlantic
Result	German tactical victory

Belligerents
Germany	Canada; United Kingdom; United States; Poland

Commanders and leaders
Admiral Karl Dönitz	Comm:Capt. NH Gale; SOE:Cdr. P Heineman

Strength
17 U-boats	26 merchant ships 21 escorts

Casualties and losses
	5 ships sunk,110 killed

Convoy SC 100 was a North Atlantic convoy, one of the SC series which ran during the battle of the Atlantic in World War II. It was the 100th of the numbered series of slow convoys of merchant ships from Sydney, Cape Breton Island to Liverpool. It came under attack, one of several convoy battles that occurred during the autumn and winter of 1942, losing five ships.

== Background ==
SC 100, comprised twenty six merchant ships and departed Halifax for the UK under local escort on 12 September 1942. The Convoy Commodore was Capt. NH Gale in Athelsultan. SC 100 was met by its Ocean Escort, Group A-3, led by US Coast Guard cutter Campbell, under Cdr. P Heineman. Also in the group was the cutter Spencer and four RCN corvettes. A-3 was joined by the corvette Trillium, escorting ships from Wabana, and by three corvettes travelling in convoy for refit in the UK. During the action SC 100 was joined by several units as reinforcement, including the newly formed convoy support group, 20EG, led by Comm. FJ Walker.

SC 100 was attacked by units of two U-boat patrol lines, Lohs, of 18 boats, and Pfiel, of 11 Uboats, under the guidance of U-boat Commander (BdU) Adm K Dönitz.

== Action ==
The convoy departed Halifax on 12 September 1942 and was joined on 16 September by Mid-Ocean Escort Force Group A-3. Ahead of the convoy were three U-boat patrol lines; Vorwarts, of 18 boats, off the east of North America; Lohs, of 19 boats, south of Greenland, and Pfeil, 11 boats, moving west from bases in Occupied France. SC 100 passed through the Vorwarts patrol line without being detected, and these boats took no further part in the action, but on 18 September the convoy was found and reported by U-599, of Lohs. U-599 commenced shadowing, while other U-boats of the group joined; first U-755, which had sunk the USCG weather ship Muskeget the previous week, then U-259 and U-569. These boats began their attack, but U-259 collided with a merchant ship and was forced to break off. Both boats were vigorously attacked by escort ships, but suffered no damage. Two more Lohs boats, U-373 and U-596 joined; the latter attacked and sank the freighter Empire Hartebeeste, but a claim by U-373 to have torpedoed a corvette was not substantiated.

At this point a massive storm blew up (described by U-boat reports as "a hurricane"), making further attempts impossible. Faced with this BdU called off the operation, but several boats remained in contact and on the third day U-617, of Pfeil made contact and torpedoed Athelsultan, the commodores ship. U-617 also sank the stragglers Tennessee and Roumanie, which had become separated in the storm. Meanwhile, SC 100 had been re-inforced by ships from nearby convoys, and from 20 EG, bringing the total number of warships to 15. On 24 September two more U-boats made contact; U-432 sank the freighter Penmar, but a claim by U-258 of two freighters sunk was mistaken. The next day, as the weather cleared, aircraft of RAF Coastal Command were able to give saturation cover, forcing all U-boats still in contact to break off contact. With this BdU dropped plans to re-engage with SC 100 and moved the U-boats present to other tasks. With no further attacks SC 100 arrived safely at Liverpool on 28 September.

== Assessment ==
Despite the number of U-boats called to this action few were able to make contact, due to the storm. Those that did were driven off by the escorts; of the five ships sunk by enemy action only two were in convoy at the time. It has been suggested that the ships of Group A-3 were not fast enough to catch surfaced U-boats; but Donitz attributed the failure of the attack on the aggressive handling of the escorts as well as the appalling weather. The U-boats sank five scattered ships before losing contact on 25 September; another was lost in a collision. Twenty ships arrived safely.

SC 100 was one of three North Atlantic convoys attacked during September; in the same period the Allies sailed nineteen convoys comprising some 580 ships. Total losses were 19 ships and two escorts, (some 3% of ships involved); the cost to the U-Boat Arm was five boats lost, and another four damaged sufficiently to be returned to base.

== Ships in convoy ==
=== Allied merchant ships ===
Name	Flag	Casualties	Tonnage (GRT)	Cargo	Fate	Notes
Ary Lensen	United Kingdom		3,214	Sugar		
Athelsultan	United Kingdom	51	8,882	Molasses, alcohol	Sunk by U-617 on 23 September SE of Cape Farewell, Greenland.	Convoy commodore's ship, Capt N H Gale DSO Rd RNR. Survivors picked up by HMCS Weyburn and HMS Nasturtium and landed at Londonderry Port.
Atland	Sweden		5,203	Wabana iron ore		
Atlantic	United Kingdom		5,414	Steel, lumber		
Belgian Fisherman	Belgium		4,714	General cargo		
Boris	Greece		5,166	Wabana iron ore		
Dux	Norway		1,590	Lumber		
Empire Guinevere	United Kingdom		7,072	Steel and tobacco		
Empire Hartebeeste	United Kingdom	0	5,676	General cargo	Sunk by U-596 on 20 September SE of Cape Farewell, Greenland.	
Empire Opal	United Kingdom		9,811	Benzene, paraffin		
Empire Razorbill	United Kingdom		5,118	Steel, tobacco		
Empire Soldier	United Kingdom		4,539	General cargo	Marine accident	Sunk in a collision with tanker F. J. Wolfe
Empire Stour	United Kingdom		4,696	General cargo		
Esturia	United Kingdom		6,968	Fuel oil		
Greylock	United States		7,460	General cargo		
Gunvor Maersk	United Kingdom		1,977	Sydney lumber		
Innesmoor	United Kingdom		4,392	General cargo		
Mount Evans	Panama		5,598	General cargo		
Norhauk	Norway		6,086	General cargo		Rescued crew from Empire Hartebeeste
Panama	United Kingdom		6,650	Sugar		
Pennmar	United States	2	5,868	General cargo	Straggled and was sunk by U-432 on 24 September.	Survivors picked up by USCGC Bibb
Rio Verde	Norway		3,223	General cargo		
Roumanie	Belgium	42	3,658	General cargo	Straggled and was sunk by U-617 on 24 September.	Sole survivor was picked up by U-617 as a PoW and landed at St Nazaire.
Spurt	Norway		2,061	Lumber		Turned back
Tennessee	United Kingdom	15	2,342	Sydney grain	Straggled and sunk by U-617 on 23 September SE of Cape Farewell, Greenland.	Survivors picked up by HMS Nasturtium and USCGC Ingham
Tore Jarl	Norway		1,514	Lumber		

=== Convoy escorts ===
Name	Flag	Type	Joined	Left
HMCS Bittersweet	Royal Canadian Navy	Flower-class corvette	16 September 1942	28 September 1942
ORP Błyskawica	Polish Navy	Grom-class destroyer	16 September 1942	26 September 1942
USCGC Campbell	United States Coast Guard	Treasury-class cutter	16 September 1942	16 September 1942
HMS Deptford	Royal Navy	Grimsby-class sloop	25 September 1942	25 September 1942
HMCS Kenogami	Royal Canadian Navy	Flower-class corvette	12 September 1942	26 September 1942
HMT Kingston Beryl	Royal Navy	ASW naval trawler	27 September 1942	27 September 1942
HMCS Louisburg	Royal Canadian Navy	Flower-class corvette	21 September 1942	26 September 1942
HMCS Lunenburg	Royal Canadian Navy	Flower-class corvette	21 September 1942	27 September 1942
HMCS Matapedia	Royal Canadian Navy	Flower-class corvette	12 September 1942	16 September 1942
HMCS Mayflower	Royal Canadian Navy	Flower-class corvette	16 September 1942	28 September 1942
HMCS Moose Jaw	Royal Canadian Navy	Flower-class corvette	12 September 1942	16 September 1942
HMT Narvik	Royal Navy	ASW naval trawler	27 September 1942	28 September 1942
HMS Nasturtium	Royal Navy	Flower-class corvette	16 September 1942	27 September 1942
HMCS Niagara	Royal Canadian Navy	Town-class destroyer	12 September 1942	16 September 1942
HMCS Prescott	Royal Canadian Navy	Flower-class corvette	21 September 1942	26 September 1942
HMCS Rosthern	Royal Canadian Navy	Flower-class corvette	25 September 1942	25 September 1942
HMS Rother	Royal Navy	River-class frigate	25 September 1942	25 September 1942
USCGC Spencer	United States Coast Guard	Treasury-class cutter	16 September 1942	16 September 1942
HMCS Trillium	Royal Canadian Navy	Flower-class corvette	15 September 1942	28 September 1942
HMCS Weyburn	Royal Canadian Navy	Flower-class corvette	16 September 1942	27 September 1942
HMCS Woodstock	Royal Canadian Navy	Flower-class corvette	21 September 1942	26 September 1942

== U-boats ==
The convoy was attacked by both Wolfpack Lohs comprising 9 U-boats, and 8 U-boats from Wolfpack Pfeil, namely

=== Wolfpack Lohs ===
- U-135
- U-176
- U-259
- U-373
- U-410
- U-432
- U-569
- U-599
- U-755

=== Wolfpack Pfeil ===
- U-216
- U-221
- U-258
- U-356
- U-595
- U-607
- U-615
- U-617

== Bibliography ==
- Clay Blair : Hitler's U-Boat War Vol II:The Hunted 1942-1945 (1998). ISBN 0-304-35261-6
- Hague, Arnold (2000). The Allied Convoy System 1939–1945. ISBN 1-86176-147-3.
- Rohwer, J.; Hummelchen, G. (1992). Chronology of the War at Sea 1939–1945. Naval Institute Press. ISBN 1-55750-105-X.
- Willoughby, Malcolm F. The U.S. Coast Guard in World War II (1957) United States Naval Institute
