= HMCS Rosthern =

Flower-class corvette

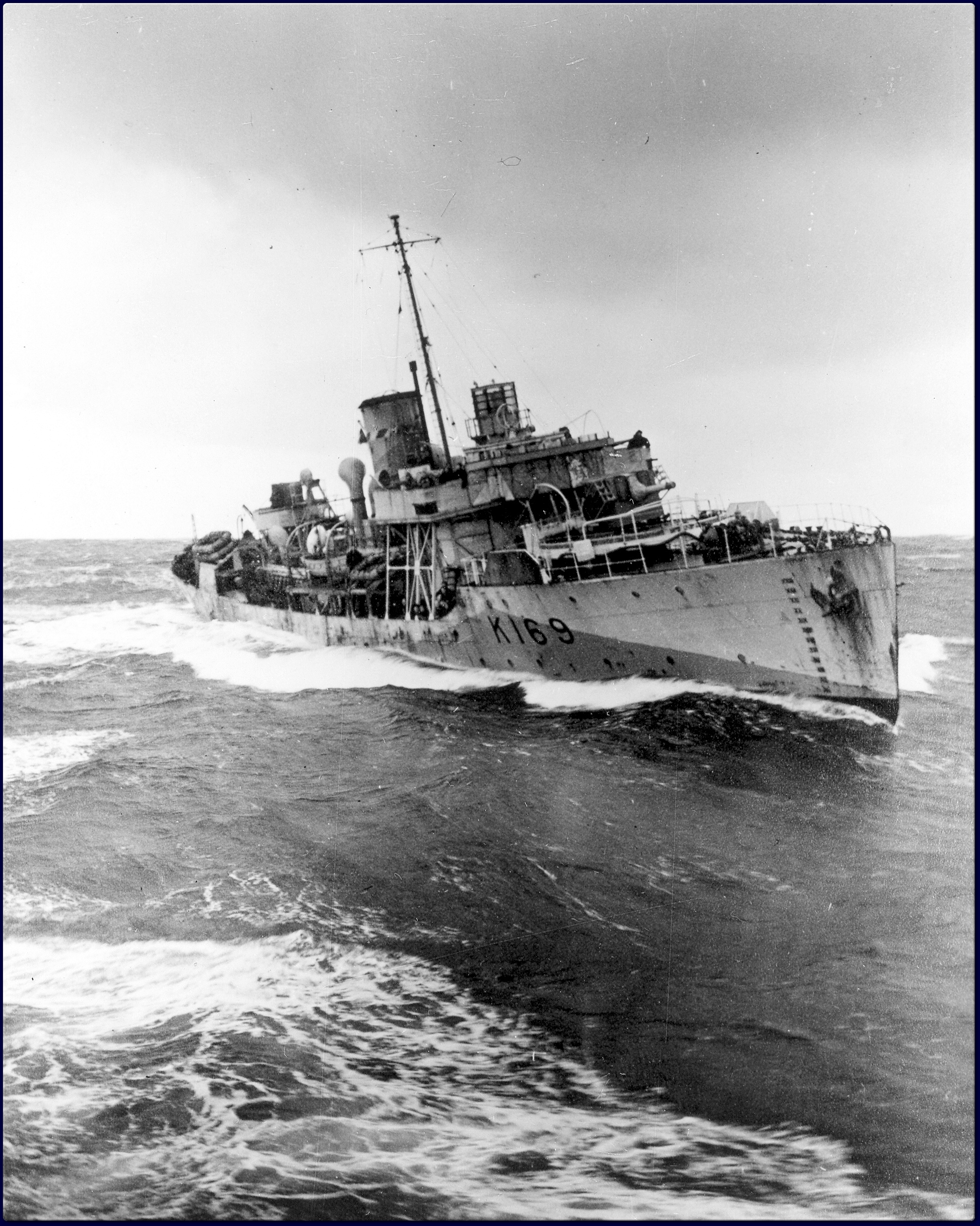
- HMCS Rosthern, circa 1942-1944

History

Canada
- Name: Rosthern
- Namesake: Rosthern, Saskatchewan
- Ordered: 1 February 1940
- Builder: Port Arthur Shipbuilding Company, Port Arthur
- Laid down: 18 June 1940
- Launched: 30 November 1940
- Commissioned: 17 June 1941
- Decommissioned: 19 July 1945
- Identification: Pennant number: K169
- Honours and awards: Atlantic 1941-45
- Fate: Scrapped in June 1946.

General characteristics
- Class & type: Flower-class corvette (original)
- Displacement: 925 long tons (940 t; 1,036 short tons)
- Length: 205 ft (62.48 m)o/a
- Beam: 33 ft (10.06 m)
- Draught: 11.5 ft (3.51 m)
- Propulsion: single shaft; 2 × fire tube Scotch boilers; 1 × 4-cycle triple-expansion reciprocating steam engine; 2,750 ihp (2,050 kW)
- Speed: 16 knots (29.6 km/h)
- Range: 3,500 nautical miles (6,482 km) at 12 knots (22.2 km/h)
- Complement: 85
- Sensors & processing systems: 1 × SW1C or 2C radar; 1 × Type 123A or Type 127DV sonar
- Armament: 1 × BL 4 in (102 mm) Mk.IX single gun; 2 × .50 cal machine gun (twin); 2 × Lewis .303 cal machine gun (twin); 2 × Mk.II depth charge throwers; 2 × depth charge rails with 40 depth charges; originally fitted with minesweeping gear, later removed

HMCS Rosthern was a Flower-class corvette that served in the Royal Canadian Navy during the Second World War. She served primarily in the Battle of the Atlantic as a convoy escort. She is named for Rosthern, Saskatchewan.

== Background ==
Flower-class corvettes like Rosthern serving with the Royal Canadian Navy during the Second World War were different from earlier and more traditional sail-driven corvettes. The "corvette" designation was created by the French for classes of small warships; the Royal Navy borrowed the term for a period but discontinued its use in 1877. During the hurried preparations for war in the late 1930s, Winston Churchill reactivated the corvette class, needing a name for smaller ships used in an escort capacity, in this case based on a whaling ship design. The generic name "flower" was used to designate the class of these ships, which – in the Royal Navy – were named after flowering plants.

Corvettes commissioned by the Royal Canadian Navy during the Second World War were named after communities for the most part, to better represent the people who took part in building them. This idea was put forth by Admiral Percy W. Nelles. Sponsors were commonly associated with the community for which the ship was named. Royal Navy corvettes were designed as open sea escorts, while Canadian corvettes were developed for coastal auxiliary roles which was exemplified by their minesweeping gear. Eventually the Canadian corvettes would be modified to allow them to perform better on the open seas.

== Construction ==
Rosthern was ordered 1 February 1940 as part of the 1939-1940 Flower-class building program. She was laid down on 18 June 1940 at Port Arthur Shipbuilding Co. in Port Arthur, Ontario and launched on 30 November 1940. She was commissioned into the RCN on 17 June 1941 at Montreal, Quebec.

Rosthern had only one significant refit during her career. After developing mechanical troubles in October 1941, she spent two months repairing on the river Clyde in the United Kingdom before being sent back to Halifax in December 1941 for further repairs. Rosthern was one of the few Flowers not to have her fo'c'sle extended.

== War service ==
After arriving at Halifax for deployment, Rosthern initially joined Newfoundland Command, escorting convoys between St. John's and Iceland. She escorted her first convoy, leaving 7 October 1941, but developed mechanical defects on the way and was sent on to the Clyde for repairs. She did not return to service until February 1942. She would remain an ocean escort until June 1944.

In April 1942 she was made a member of the Mid-Ocean Escort Force (MOEF) escort group A-3. In May 1942, it was renumbered C-5. During her service with MOEF, Rosthern fought in three significant convoy battles; SC 100 in September 1942, ON 166 in February 1943, and SC 121 in March 1943. During these convoy battles, Rosthern picked up survivors from several merchants ships including on 29 October 1942 when she and HMCS Summerside together picked up survivors from the American tanker Pan New York that was damaged by U-624 in the North Atlantic about 550 nautical miles (1,020 km) west of Malin Head. The corvettes sank the wrecked tanker with gunfire and depth charges. During the battle for Convoy ON 166, she picked up survivors from the Norwegian merchant Ingria and British merchant Manchester Merchant. During the battle for Convoy SC 121, Rosthern picked up three survivors from the British merchant Egyptian, which had been sunk.

In late May 1944, Rosthern returned to Canada to become a training ship for navigation and handling at Halifax. In December 1944, she was attached to the Western Local Escort Force as part of Halifax Force. She remained with this unit until the end of the war, her final significant duty was escorting HMCS Provider back to Canada.

=== Trans-Atlantic convoys escorted ===
| Convoy | Escort Group | Dates | Notes |
|---|---|---|---|
| SC 48 | | 9-21 Oct 1941 | Newfoundland to Iceland |
| ON 43 | | 5-9 Dec 1941 | Iceland to Newfoundland |
| SC 70 | | 15-22 Feb 1942 | Newfoundland to Iceland |
| HX 177 | | 1–8 March 1942 | Newfoundland to Iceland |
| ON 77 | | 18–26 March 1942 | Iceland to Newfoundland |
| HX 184 | | 12–19 April 1942 | Newfoundland to Northern Ireland |
| ON 91 | | 2–11 May 1942 | Northern Ireland to Newfoundland |
| HX 190 | MOEF group A3 | 20–27 May 1942 | Newfoundland to Northern Ireland |
| ON 102 | MOEF group A3 | 10–21 June 1942 | Northern Ireland to Newfoundland |
| ON 122 | | 26-27 Aug 1942 | battle reinforcement |
| SC 99 | MOEF group C1 | 9-16 Sept 1942 | Newfoundland to Northern Ireland |
| SC 100 | MOEF group A3 | 19-27 Sept 1942 | Newfoundland to Northern Ireland |
| ON 135 | MOEF group A3 | 3-15 Oct 1942 | Northern Ireland to Newfoundland |
| HX 212 | MOEF group A3 | 23 Oct – 1 Nov 1942 | Newfoundland to Northern Ireland |
| ON 145 | MOEF group A3 | 10-20 Nov 1942 | Northern Ireland to Newfoundland |
| SC 111 | MOEF group A3 | 1-14 Dec 1942 | Newfoundland to Northern Ireland |
| ON 156 | MOEF group A3 | 24 Dec 1942 – 8 Jan 1943 | Northern Ireland to Newfoundland |
| HX 223 | MOEF group A3 | 19 Jan – 1 Feb 1943 | Newfoundland to Northern Ireland |
| ON 166 | MOEF group A3 | 12-25 Feb 1943 | Northern Ireland to Newfoundland |
| SC 121 | MOEF group A3 | 3–12 March 1943 | Newfoundland to Northern Ireland |
| ON 175 | MOEF group A3 | 25 March – 8 April 1943 | Northern Ireland to Newfoundland |
| HX 233 | MOEF group A3 | 12–16 April 1943 | Newfoundland to Northern Ireland |
| HX 234 | MOEF group B4 | 17–28 April 1943 | Newfoundland to Northern Ireland |
| ON 182 | MOEF group C5 | 7–16 May 1943 | Northern Ireland to Newfoundland |
| HX 240 | MOEF group C5 | 25 May – 2 June 1943 | Newfoundland to Northern Ireland |
| ON 188 | | 11–20 June 1943 | Northern Ireland to Newfoundland |
| ON 189 | WLEF | 24–28 June 1943 | Newfoundland to Halifax |
| HX 262 | | 24 Oct – 2 Nov 1943 | Newfoundland to Northern Ireland |
| ON 211 | | 14-24 Nov 1943 | Northern Ireland to Newfoundland |
| HX 268 | | 1-10 Dec 1943 | Newfoundland to Northern Ireland |
| ON 217 | | 25 Dec 1943 – 5 Jan 1944 | Northern Ireland to Newfoundland |
| HX 274 | | 11-21 Jan 1944 | Newfoundland to Northern Ireland |
| ON 222 | | 31 Jan – 10 Feb 1944 | Northern Ireland to Newfoundland |
| SC 153 | | 18 Feb – 1 March 1944 | Newfoundland to Northern Ireland |
| ONS 31 | | 14–25 March 1944 | Northern Ireland to Newfoundland |
| HX 285 | | 3–11 April 1944 | Newfoundland to Northern Ireland |
| ON 233 | | 20 April – 3 May 1944 | Northern Ireland to Newfoundland |
| HX 290 | | 10–19 May 1944 | Newfoundland to Northern Ireland |
| ON 238 | | 27 May – 3 June 1944 | Northern Ireland to Newfoundland |
| HX 300 | WLEF | 19–20 July 1944 | Halifax to Newfoundland; the largest HX convoy of the war |
| HX 307 | WLEF | 8-11 Sept 1944 | Halifax to Newfoundland |
| HX 318 | WLEF | 5-7 Nov 1944 | Halifax to Newfoundland |
| ONS 40 | WLEF | 29-30 Jan 1945 | Newfoundland to Halifax |
| SC 166 | WLEF | 31 Jan – 4 Feb 1945 | Halifax to Newfoundland |
| ONS 42 | WLEF | 4–5 March 1945 | Newfoundland to Halifax |
| SC 173 | WLEF | 18–24 April 1945 | Halifax to Newfoundland |
| ONS 47 | WLEF | 27–28 April 1945 | Newfoundland to Halifax |
| ON 297 | WLEF | 30 April – 2 May 1945 | Newfoundland to Halifax |
| HX 356 | WLEF | 15–18 May 1945 | Halifax to Newfoundland |
| ON 302 | WLEF | 21–27 May 1945 | Newfoundland to dispersal following end of hostilities |

== Post war service ==
Rosthern was paid off 19 July 1945 at Sorel, Quebec. She was sold for scrap in June 1946 and broken up at Hamilton, Ontario.
