= HMCS Eyebright =

Flower-class corvette

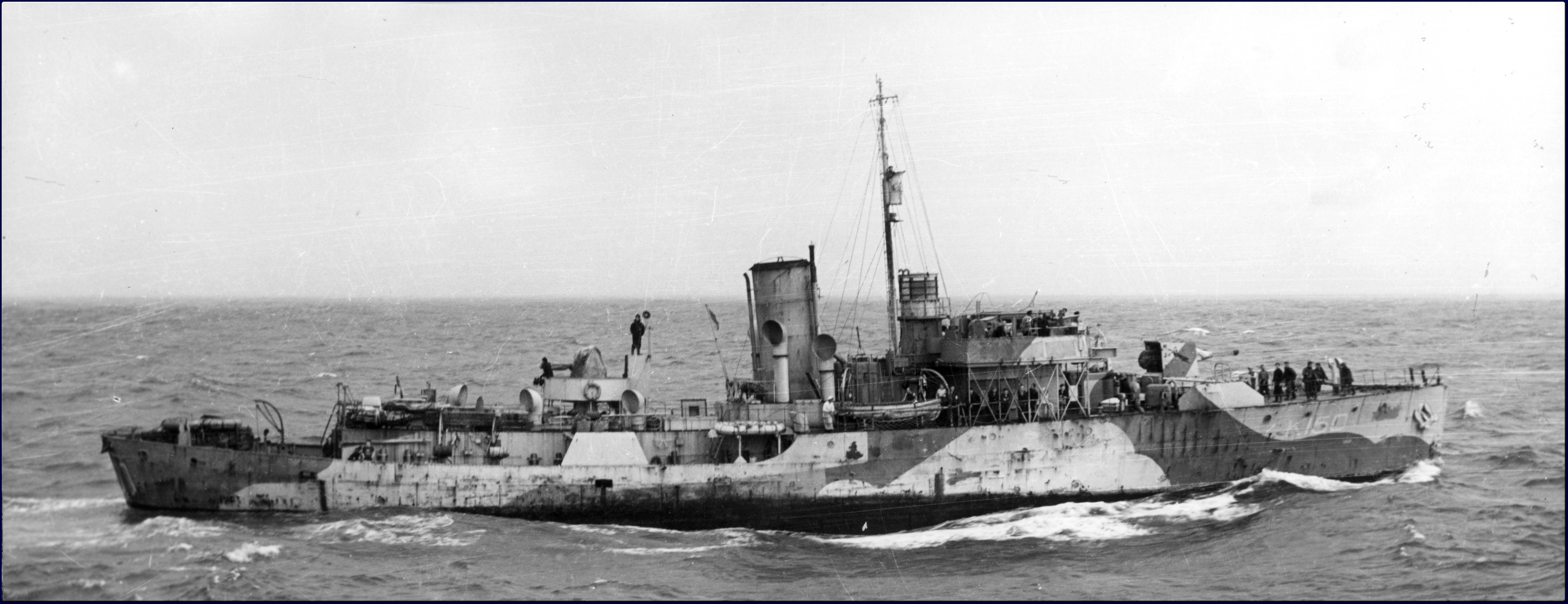
- HMCS Eyebright, between 1943-1945.

History

United Kingdom
- Name: Eyebright
- Namesake: Euphrasia
- Ordered: 20 January 1940
- Builder: Canadian Vickers Ltd., Montreal
- Laid down: 20 February 1940
- Launched: 22 July 1940
- Commissioned: 26 November 1940
- Out of service: 15 May 1941 - loaned to Canada
- Identification: Pennant number: K150
- Fate: Loaned to Canada 1941; returned 1945; sold 1947

Canada
- Name: Eyebright
- Acquired: loaned from Royal Navy
- Commissioned: 15 May 1941
- Out of service: 17 June 1945
- Identification: Pennant number: K150
- Honours and awards: Atlantic 1941-45
- Fate: Returned to the Royal Navy 17 June 1945.

General characteristics
- Class & type: Flower-class corvette (original)
- Displacement: 925 long tons (940 t; 1,036 short tons)
- Length: 205 ft (62.48 m)o/a
- Beam: 33 ft (10.06 m)
- Draught: 11.5 ft (3.51 m)
- Propulsion: single shaft; 2 × fire tube Scotch boilers; 1 × 4-cycle triple-expansion reciprocating steam engine; 2,750 ihp (2,050 kW)
- Speed: 16 knots (29.6 km/h)
- Range: 3,500 nautical miles (6,482 km) at 12 knots (22.2 km/h)
- Complement: 85
- Sensors & processing systems: 1 × SW1C or 2C radar; 1 × Type 123A or Type 127DV sonar
- Armament: 1 × BL 4 in (102 mm) Mk.IX single gun; 2 × .50 cal machine gun (twin); 2 × Lewis .303 cal machine gun (twin); 2 × Mk.II depth charge throwers; 2 × Depth charge rails with 40 depth charges; originally fitted with minesweeping gear, later removed

HMCS Eyebright was a Flower-class corvette that served mainly with the Royal Canadian Navy during the Second World War in the Battle of the Atlantic. She was named after the medicinal flowering plant genus Euphrasia.

== Background ==
Flower-class corvettes like Eyebright serving with the Royal Canadian Navy during the Second World War were different from earlier and more traditional sail-driven corvettes. The "corvette" designation was created by the French for classes of small warships; the Royal Navy borrowed the term for a period but discontinued its use in 1877. During the hurried preparations for war in the late 1930s, Winston Churchill reactivated the corvette class, needing a name for smaller ships used in an escort capacity, in this case based on a whaling ship design. The generic name "flower" was used to designate the class of these ships, which – in the Royal Navy – were named after flowering plants.

== Construction ==
She was ordered for the Royal Navy (RN) as HMS Eyebright as part of the 1939-1940 Flower-class building program. She was laid down by Canadian Vickers Ltd. in Montreal, Quebec on 20 February 1940 and launched on 22 July 1940. Eyebright was commissioned into the RN on 26 November 1940 in Montreal. She was towed to Halifax and was finished enough to make an ocean crossing, which she did in January 1941 with HX 104. However she was not completed until 16 April 1941 after she had arrived at Sunderland in the United Kingdom. On 15 May 1941 Eyebright was one of ten corvettes loaned to Canada. She could be told apart from other Canadian Flowers by her lack of minesweeping gear and the siting of the after gun tub amidships.

Eyebright underwent two major refits during her career. Beginning in November 1941, Eyebright refitted in Charlottetown. The refit took two months to complete. The second refit took place in Baltimore, beginning in July 1943 and taking two months to complete.

== War service ==
=== Royal Navy ===
After completing Eyebright was sent to work up at Tobermory, where the escort training facilities were located. Once those were finished she was assigned to the RN escort group EG-4 based in Iceland in May 1941.

=== Royal Canadian Navy ===
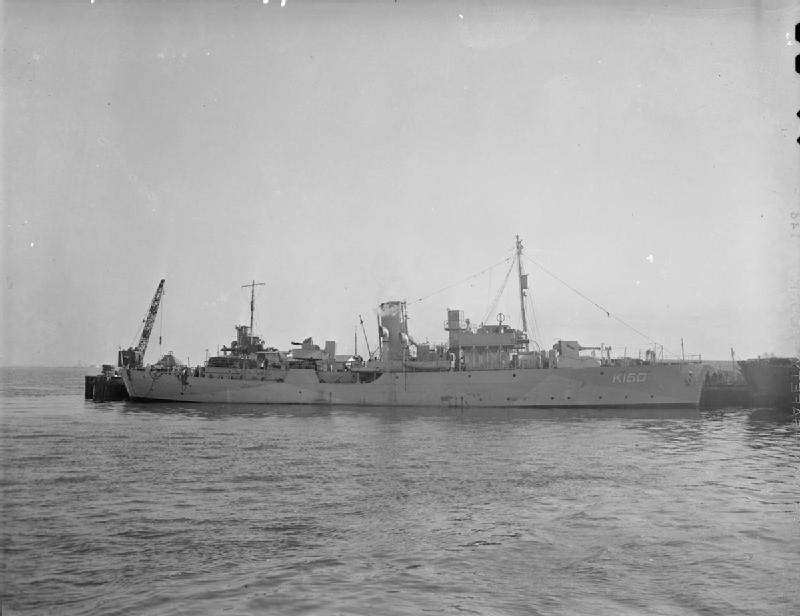
HMCS Eyebright tied to dock wall.

Eyebright was loaned to the Royal Canadian Navy in May 1941. Upon arrival, she was assigned to Newfoundland Command as an ocean escort. There she was placed in the escort group 18N and then beginning in October 1941, group N16. In December 1941 she left for a two-month refit returning in January to serve briefly with escort groups N14 and N13. Eyebright participated in the battle for convoy SC 44 in September 1941. It was to be the only convoy she escorted to lose ships to submarine torpedoes.

Eyebright served with Mid-Ocean Escort Force (MOEF) groups C1, C3 and C4 from April 1942 through to November 1944. After returning from her second refit, Eyebright transferred to the Western Local Escort Force (WLEF) in November 1944 as part of escort group W-3. She stayed with that group until the end of the war with two exceptions, one trip with MOEF group C-5 and escorting the last HX convoy of the war to the United Kingdom.

=== Trans-Atlantic convoys escorted ===
Convoy Record
Convoy	Escort Group	Dates	Notes
HX 104		21 January – 8 February 1941	21 ships escorted without loss from Newfoundland to Iceland
OB 332		13–23 June 1941	43 ships escorted without loss from Iceland to Newfoundland
HX 136		30 June – 13 July 1941	46 ships escorted without loss from Newfoundland to Iceland
OB 345		16–24 July 1941	60 ships escorted without loss from Iceland to Newfoundland
HX 142		5–12 August 1941	65 ships escorted without loss from Newfoundland to Iceland
ON 7		21–25 August 1941	38 ships escorted without loss from Iceland to Newfoundland
HX 149		13–20 September 1941	57 ships escorted without loss from Newfoundland to Iceland
SC 44		20-22 Sept 1941	Newfoundland to Iceland; 4 ships torpedoed & sunk
ON 19A		28 Sept – 4 Oct 1941	Iceland shuttle
SC 49		13-21 Oct 1941	31 ships escorted without loss from Newfoundland to Iceland
ON 29		28 Oct – 5 Nov 1941	31 ships escorted without loss from Iceland to Newfoundland
SC 66		23 January – 4 February 1942	29 ships escorted without loss from Newfoundland to Iceland
ON 64		11–18 February 1942	37 ships escorted without loss from Iceland to Newfoundland
SC 72		10–16 March 1942	19 ships escorted without loss from Newfoundland to Iceland
ON 78		22 March – 3 April 1942	27 ships escorted without loss from Northern Ireland to Newfoundland
SC 79		15–27 April 1942	53 ships escorted without loss from Newfoundland to Northern Ireland
ON 93	MOEF group C3	9–17 May 1942	25 ships escorted without loss from Northern Ireland to Newfoundland
SC 85	MOEF group C4	31 May – 11 June 1942	60 ships escorted without loss from Newfoundland to Northern Ireland
ON 123	MOEF group C1	22–31 August 1942	39 ships escorted without loss from Northern Ireland to Newfoundland
SC 99	MOEF group C1	9–19 September 1942	59 ships escorted without loss from Newfoundland to Northern Ireland
ON 133	MOEF group C1	26 September – 5 Oct 1942	35 ships escorted without loss from Northern Ireland to Newfoundland
HX 211	MOEF group C1	13–20 October 1942	29 ships escorted without loss from Newfoundland to Northern Ireland
ON 143	MOEF group C1	2–11 November 1942	26 ships escorted without loss from Northern Ireland to Newfoundland
SC 110	MOEF group C1	24 November – 5 December 1942	33 ships escorted without loss from Halifax to Newfoundland
HX 221	MOEF group C3	5–13 January 1943	36 ships escorted without loss from Newfoundland to Northern Ireland
ON 163	MOEF group C3	25 January – 8 February 1943	38 ships escorted without loss from Northern Ireland to Newfoundland
HX 226	MOEF group C3	14-23 Feb 1943	43 ships escorted without loss from Newfoundland to Northern Ireland
ON 172	MOEF group C3	10–21 March 1943	16 ships escorted without loss from Northern Ireland to Newfoundland
SC 124	MOEF group C3	28 March – 6 April 1943	33 ships escorted without loss from Newfoundland to Northern Ireland
ON 180	MOEF group C3	25 April – 7 May 1943	65 ships escorted without loss from Northern Ireland to Newfoundland
HX 238	MOEF group C3	13–21 May 1943	45 ships escorted without loss from Newfoundland to Northern Ireland
ON 187		2–10 June 1943	75 ships escorted without loss from Northern Ireland to Newfoundland
HX 256		15–21 September 1943	59 ships escorted without loss from Newfoundland to Northern Ireland
ONS 19		27 September – 9 October 1943	49 ships escorted without loss from Northern Ireland to Newfoundland
HX 261		17–25 October 1943	65 ships escorted without loss from Newfoundland to Northern Ireland
ON 210		7–17 November 1943	42 ships escorted without loss from Northern Ireland to Newfoundland
SC 147		23 November – 3 December 1943	50 ships escorted without loss from Halifax to Newfoundland
ON 216		17–29 December 1943	40 ships escorted without loss from Northern Ireland to Newfoundland
SC 150		3–14 January 1944	19 ships escorted without loss from Halifax to Newfoundland
ONS 28		29 January – 11 February 1944	29 ships escorted without loss from Northern Ireland to Newfoundland
HX 279		27–28 February 1944	59 ships escorted without loss from Newfoundland to Northern Ireland
ON 227		9–17 March 1944	61 ships escorted without loss from Northern Ireland to Newfoundland
HX 284		26 March – 5 April 1944	80 ships escorted without loss from Newfoundland to Northern Ireland
ON 232		14–23 April 1944	45 ships escorted without loss from Northern Ireland to Newfoundland
HX 289		3–13 May 1944	130 ships escorted without loss from Newfoundland to Northern Ireland
ON 237		20–29 May 1944	64 ships escorted without loss from Northern Ireland to Newfoundland
HX 294		9–19 June 1944	113 ships escorted without loss from Newfoundland to Northern Ireland
ON 242		29 June – 5 July 1944	99 ships escorted without loss from Northern Ireland to Newfoundland
SC 161		19 November – 3 December 1944	49 ships escorted without loss from Newfoundland to Northern Ireland
ONS 38		14 December 1944 – 2 January 1945	26 ships escorted without loss from Northern Ireland to Newfoundland
HX 358		25 May – 6 June 1945	56 ships escorted without loss from Newfoundland to Northern Ireland; the last HX convoy of the war

== Post-war service ==
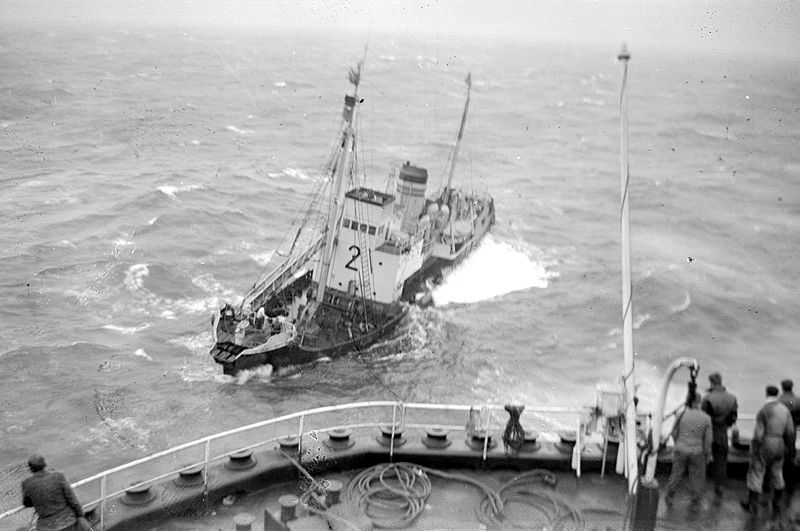
Albert W. Vinke

On 17 July 1945 she was returned to the Royal Navy. Laid up, she was and sold for civilian use in 1947 and converted into the Dutch whale-catcher Albert W. Vinke of 717 GRT in 1950. Albert W. Vinke last appeared on Lloyd's Register in 1964–65. The ship was broken up by South African Metal & Machinery Pty Ltd in Cape Town in February 1965.
