= HMCS Trillium =

Flower-class corvette

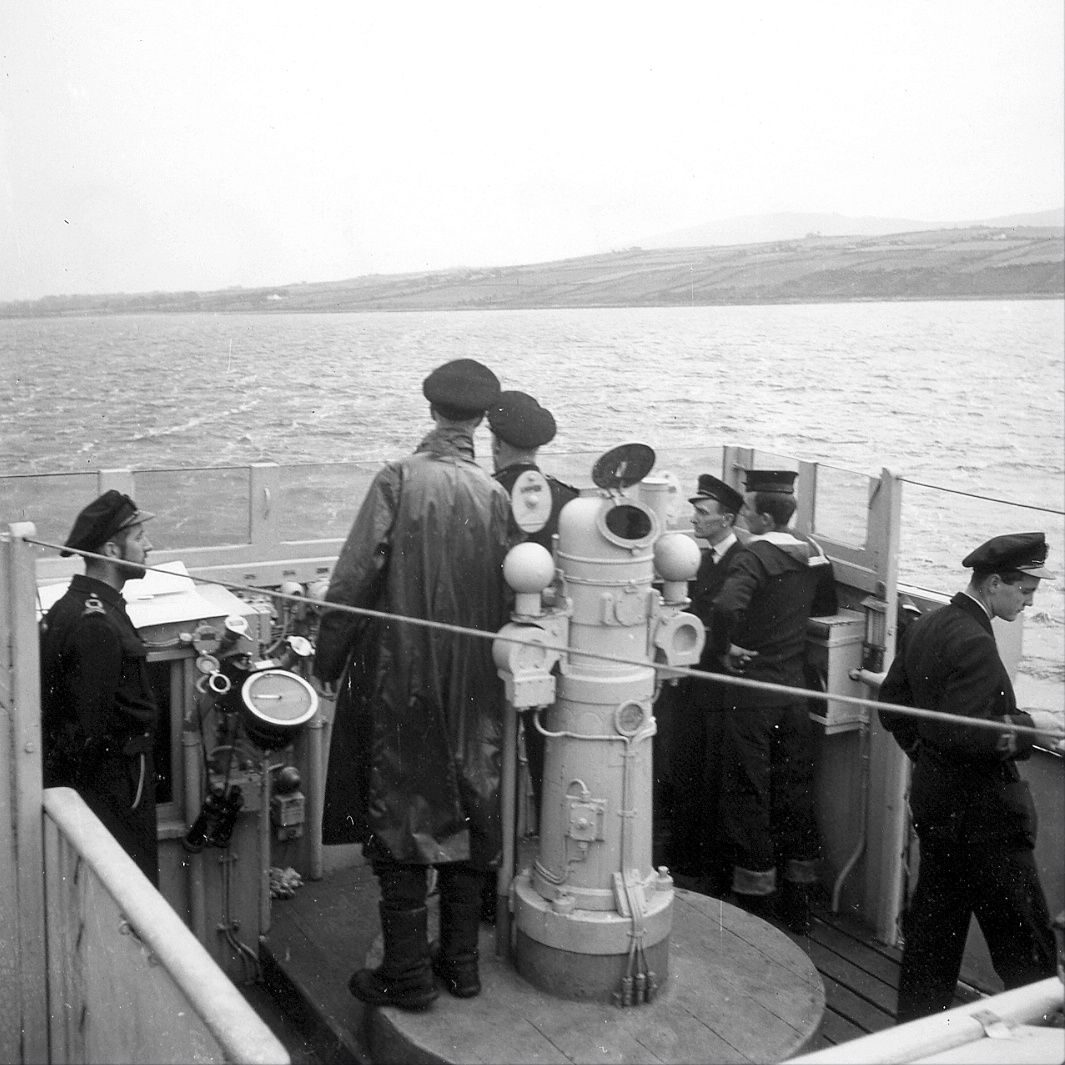
- Officers on the open bridge of HMCS Trillium

History

United Kingdom
- Name: Trillium
- Namesake: flowering plant genus Trillium
- Ordered: 20 January 1940
- Builder: Canadian Vickers Ltd., Montreal
- Laid down: 20 February 1940
- Launched: 26 June 1940
- Commissioned: 31 October 1940
- Out of service: loaned to Royal Canadian Navy 15 May 1941
- Identification: Pennant number: K172
- Fate: Returned from RCN June 1945. Sold for civilian use 1947, scrapped 1971

Canada
- Name: Trillium
- Commissioned: 15 May 1941
- Out of service: Returned to the Royal Navy 27 June 1945
- Identification: Pennant number: K172
- Honours and awards: Atlantic 1940-45

General characteristics
- Class & type: Flower-class corvette (original)
- Displacement: 925 long tons (940 t; 1,036 short tons)
- Length: 205 ft (62.48 m)o/a
- Beam: 33 ft (10.06 m)
- Draught: 11.5 ft (3.51 m)
- Propulsion: single shaft; 2 × fire tube Scotch boilers; 1 × 4-cycle triple-expansion reciprocating steam engine; 2,750 ihp (2,050 kW)
- Speed: 16 knots (29.6 km/h)
- Range: 3,500 nautical miles (6,482 km) at 12 knots (22.2 km/h)
- Complement: 85
- Sensors & processing systems: 1 × SW1C or 2C radar; 1 × Type 123A or Type 127DV sonar
- Armament: 1 × BL 4 in (102 mm) Mk.IX single gun; 2 × .50 cal machine gun (twin); 2 × Lewis .303 cal machine gun (twin); 2 × Mk.II depth charge throwers; 2 × Depth charge rails with 40 depth charges; originally fitted with minesweeping gear, later removed

HMCS Trillium was a Flower-class corvette that served in the Royal Canadian Navy during the Second World War. She served mainly as a convoy escort in the Battle of the Atlantic. She was one of ten corvettes loaned to the Canadian navy by the Royal Navy and the only one which remained an ocean escort throughout the war. She was named after the flowering plant genus Trillium, which includes wakerobin, tri flower, and birthroot.

== Background ==
Flower-class corvettes like Trillium serving with the Royal Canadian Navy during the Second World War were different from earlier and more traditional sail-driven corvettes. The "corvette" designation was created by the French for classes of small warships; the Royal Navy borrowed the term for a period but discontinued its use in 1877. During the hurried preparations for war in the late 1930s, Winston Churchill reactivated the corvette class, needing a name for smaller ships used in an escort capacity, in this case based on a whaling ship design. The generic name "flower" was used to designate the class of these ships, which – in the Royal Navy – were named after flowering plants.

== Construction ==
Trillium was ordered 20 January 1940 for the Royal Navy as part of the 1939-1940 Flower-class building program. She was laid down by Canadian Vickers Ltd. at Montreal on 20 February 1940 and was launched on 26 June 1940. She was commissioned into the Royal Navy on 31 October 1940 at Montreal. She sailed for the United Kingdom and was fully fitted out at Greenock in March 1941. Trillium was one of ten corvettes loaned to Canada on 15 May 1941. She could be told apart from other Canadian Flowers by her lack of minesweeping gear and the siting of the after gun tub amidships.

During her career, Trillium had four significant refits. The first took place at Lunenburg, Nova Scotia beginning in August 1941 and taking three months to complete. Her second overhaul took place at Galveston which was begun in April 1942 and took until June to complete. Her third refit saw her fo'c'sle extended at Boston beginning in April 1943 and was completed 10 June 1943. The final refit of her career took place in late April 1944 at Pictou, Nova Scotia and lasted two months. Afterwards she needed a further month of repairs at Halifax.

== War service ==
=== Royal Navy ===
After workups at Tobermory, Trillium was assigned to local escort group EG 4. She remained with this group until June 1941, when she left for Canada.

=== Royal Canadian Navy ===
After arriving in June 1941, Trillium was assigned to Newfoundland Command. She remained with this unit until March 1942. During her time with Newfoundland Command, she worked with escort groups 10N, 23N, N14 and N13. On 21 April 1941 she picked up 24 survivors from the British merchant Empire Endurance that had been torpedoed and sunk the previous southwest of Rockall.

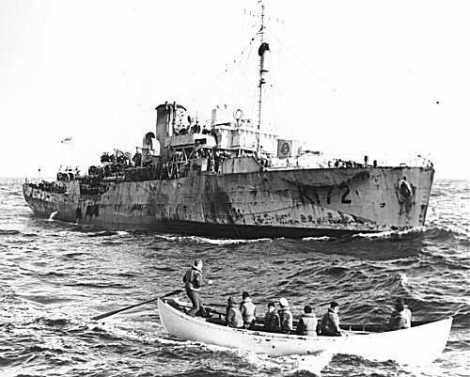
HMCS Trillium

In August 1942 she transferred to the Mid-Ocean Escort Force (MOEF) after working up. She was assigned to MOEF escort group A-3. During her time with A-3 she took part in three major convoy battles; SC 100 in September 1942, ON 166 in February 1943 and SC 121 in March 1943. On 22–23 February 1943, Trillium picked up 158 survivors from three ships which had been torpedoed over those two days. She remained with A-3 until April 1943, when she departed for a major refit.

After working up and returning to service, she was assigned to MOEF escort group C-4. She remained with the group before departing again for refit. After workups in Bermuda and returning to service, Trillium was assigned to MOEF group C-3 in September 1944. While escorting convoy ON 278, she sank a coastal merchant in a collision. Trillium needed five weeks repairs afterwards. Afterwards she returned to escort duty with C-3 for the remainder of her time with the Royal Canadian Navy. She left Canada for the last time as an escort on the last HX convoy of the war.

=== Trans-Atlantic convoys escorted ===
Convoy	Escort Group	Dates	Notes
SC 35 & HX 134		24 June – 4 July 1941	Newfoundland to Iceland
SC 39 & HX 142		4-12 Aug 1941	Newfoundland to Iceland
ON 8		17-24 Aug 1941	Iceland to Newfoundland
SC 59		12-21 Dec 1941	Newfoundland to Iceland
ON 50		28 Dec 1941 – 3 Jan 1942	Iceland to Newfoundland
SC 65		20-29 Jan 1942	Newfoundland to Iceland
ON 62		6-15 Feb 1942	Iceland to Newfoundland
SC 72		7–16 March 1942	Newfoundland to Northern Ireland
ON 78		22 March – 3 April 1942	Northern Ireland to Newfoundland
SC 95	MOEF group A3	8-18 Aug 1942	Newfoundland to Northern Ireland
ON 125	MOEF group A3	29 Aug – 7 Sept 1942	Northern Ireland to Newfoundland
SC 100	MOEF group A3	15-28 Sept 1942	Newfoundland to Northern Ireland
ON 135	MOEF group A3	3-15 Oct 1942	Northern Ireland to Newfoundland
HX 212	MOEF group A3	23 Oct – 1 Nov 1942	Newfoundland to Northern Ireland
ON 145	MOEF group A3	10-20 Nov 1942	Northern Ireland to Newfoundland
SC 111	MOEF group A3	1-17 Dec 1942	Newfoundland to Northern Ireland
ON 156	MOEF group A3	24 Dec 1942 – 8 Jan 1943	Northern Ireland to Newfoundland
HX 223	MOEF group A3	19-31 Jan 1943	Newfoundland to Northern Ireland
Convoy ON 166	MOEF group A3	12-25 Feb 1943	Northern Ireland to Newfoundland
Convoy SC 121	MOEF group A3	3–12 March 1943	Newfoundland to Northern Ireland
ON 175	MOEF group A3	25 March – 8 April 1943	Northern Ireland to Newfoundland
ON 187		15-22 Aug 1943	Northern Ireland to Newfoundland
HX 254		2-9 Sept 1943	Newfoundland to Northern Ireland
ON 203		23 Sept – 3 Oct 1943	Northern Ireland to Newfoundland
HX 260		11-18 Oct 1943	Newfoundland to Northern Ireland
ON 209		1-10 Nov 1943	Northern Ireland to Newfoundland
HX 266		18-26 Nov 1943	Newfoundland to Northern Ireland
ON 215		10-22 Dec 1943	Northern Ireland to Newfoundland
HX 272		27 Dec 1943 – 5 Jan 1944	Newfoundland to Northern Ireland
ON 220		16-28 Jan 1944	Northern Ireland to Newfoundland
ONS 30		28 Feb – 10 March 1944	Northern Ireland to Newfoundland
HX 283		19–28 March 1944	Newfoundland to Northern Ireland
ON 231		8–17 April 1944	Northern Ireland to Newfoundland
ON 253		14-25 Sept 1944	Northern Ireland to Newfoundland
HX 311		3-12 Oct 1944	Newfoundland to Northern Ireland
ON 262		26 Oct – 6 Nov 1944	Northern Ireland to Newfoundland
HX 319		14-25 Nov 1944	Newfoundland to Northern Ireland
ON 270		5-15 Dec 1944	Northern Ireland to Newfoundland
HX 327		24 Dec 1944 – 2 Jan 1945	Newfoundland to Northern Ireland
ON 278		13-14 Jan 1945	Northern Ireland to Newfoundland
ONS 43		27 Feb – 13 March 1945	Northern Ireland to Newfoundland
SC 170		20–30 March 1945	Newfoundland to Northern Ireland
ON 296		12–27 April 1945	Northern Ireland to Newfoundland
HX 358		25 May – 6 June 1945	Newfoundland to Northern Ireland; the last HX convoy of the war

== Post-war service ==
Trillium was returned to the Royal Navy at Milford Haven 27 June 1945. She was sold in 1947 for conversion to a 715 GRT whale-catcher. In 1950 she reappeared as the Honduran-registered Olympic Winner. In 1956 she was renamed Otori Maru No. 10 after being purchased by Japanese owners. In 1959 she was renamed Kyo Maru No. 16. She last appeared on Lloyd's Register in 1972–73. The ship was broken up by Kyusan Shoten K.K. at Akaho City in June 1971.
