= HMCS Summerside (K141) =

Flower-class corvette

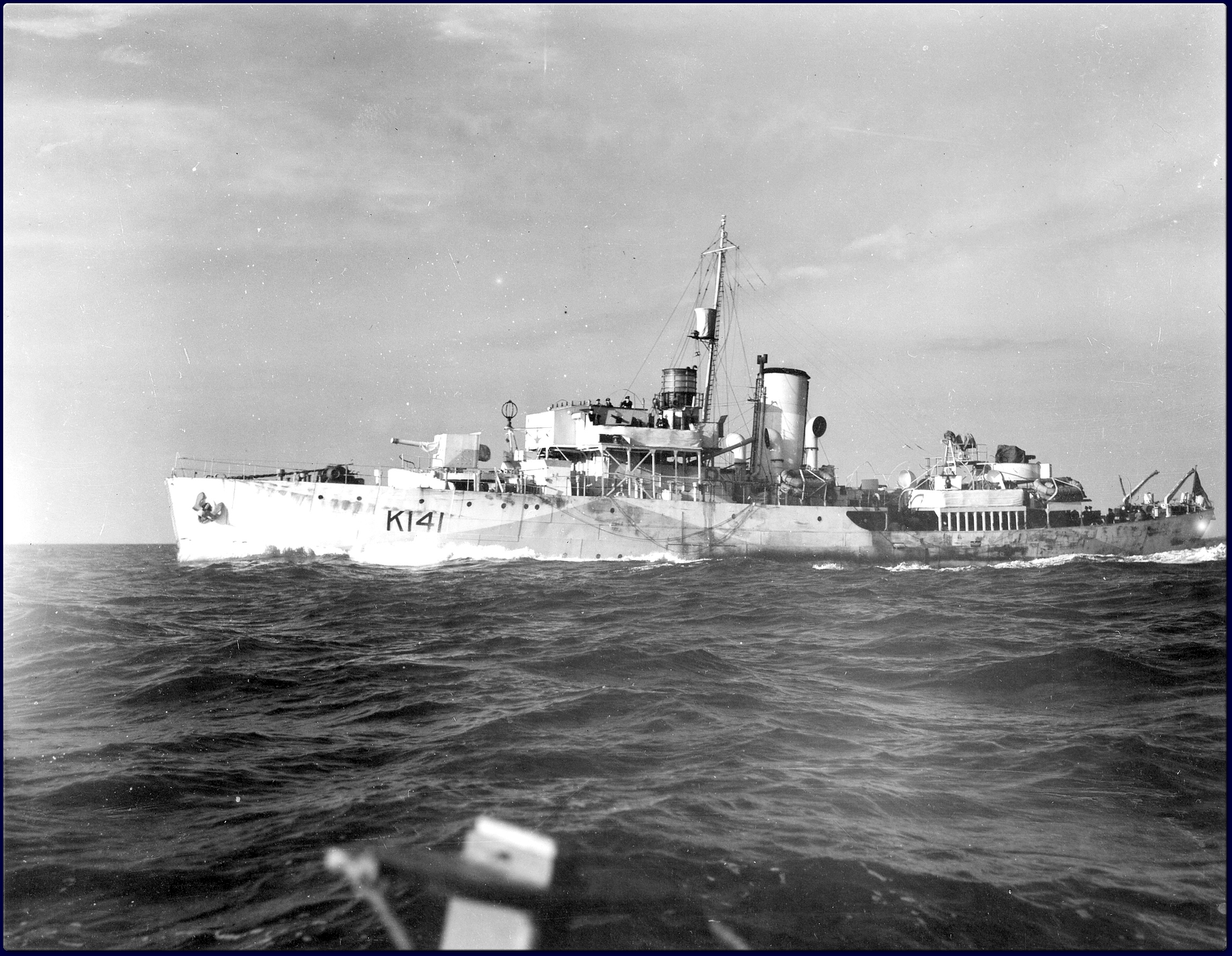
- A view of HMCS Summerside at sea, circa 1943-1945

History

Canada
- Name: Summerside
- Namesake: Summerside, Prince Edward Island
- Ordered: 23 January 1940
- Builder: Morton Engineering & Dry Dock Co., Quebec City
- Laid down: 4 October 1940
- Launched: 7 May 1941
- Commissioned: 11 September 1941
- Decommissioned: 6 July 1945
- Refit: Forecastle extended at Saint John on 25 October 1943.
- Identification: Pennant number: K141
- Honours and awards: Atlantic, 1941-44; Normandy, 1944; English Channel, 1944-45 Gulf of St. Lawrence, 1942, 1944
- Fate: Scrapped in June 1946 in Canada.

General characteristics
- Class & type: Flower-class corvette (original)
- Displacement: 925 long tons (940 t; 1,036 short tons)
- Length: 205 ft (62.48 m)o/a
- Beam: 33 ft (10.06 m)
- Draught: 11.5 ft (3.51 m)
- Propulsion: single shaft; 2 × water tube boilers; 1 × 4-cycle triple-expansion reciprocating steam engine; 2,750 ihp (2,050 kW)
- Speed: 16 knots (29.6 km/h)
- Range: 3,500 nautical miles (6,482 km) at 12 knots (22.2 km/h)
- Complement: 85
- Sensors & processing systems: 1 × SW1C or 2C radar; 1 × Type 123A or Type 127DV sonar
- Armament: 1 × BL 4 in (102 mm) Mk.IX gun; 2 × .50 cal machine gun (twin); 2 × Lewis .303 cal machine gun (twin); 2 × Mk.II depth charge throwers; 2 × depth charge rails with 40 depth charges; originally fitted with minesweeping gear, later removed

HMCS Summerside was a Flower-class corvette that served the Royal Canadian Navy during the Second World War. She served in several naval theatres of the war. She was named for Summerside, Prince Edward Island. Following the end of the war, the ship was sold for scrap and broken up.

== Background ==
Flower-class corvettes like Summerside serving with the Royal Canadian Navy during the Second World War were different from earlier and more traditional sail-driven corvettes. The "corvette" designation was created by the French for classes of small warships; the Royal Navy borrowed the term for a period but discontinued its use in 1877. During the hurried preparations for war in the late 1930s, Winston Churchill reactivated the corvette class, needing a name for smaller ships used in an escort capacity, in this case based on a whaling ship design. The generic name "flower" was used to designate the class of these ships, which – in the Royal Navy – were named after flowering plants.

Corvettes commissioned by the Royal Canadian Navy during the Second World War were named after communities for the most part, to better represent the people who took part in building them. This idea was put forth by Admiral Percy W. Nelles. Sponsors were commonly associated with the community for which the ship was named. Royal Navy corvettes were designed as open sea escorts, while Canadian corvettes were developed for coastal auxiliary roles which was exemplified by their minesweeping gear. Eventually the Canadian corvettes would be modified to allow them to perform better on the open seas.

== Construction ==
Summerside was ordered 23 January 1940 as part of the 1939-1940 Flower-class building program. She was laid down by Morton Engineering & Dry Dock Co. at Quebec on 4 October 1940 and launched on 7 May 1941. She was commissioned into the RCN on 11 September 1941 at Quebec City.

During her career, Summerside had three significant refits. The first took place in the United Kingdom where she had additional AA weaponry in the form of two 20-mm Oerlikons added to her as part of the preparations for Operation Torch. The second major refit took place at Saint John from April 1943 until September 1943. During this overhaul, Summerside had her fo'c'sle extended. Her final refit began at Liverpool, Nova Scotia in October 1944 and was completed at Halifax 18 January 1945.

== Service history ==
After arriving at Halifax for deployment, Summerside was initially assigned to Halifax Force briefly before transferring to Sydney Force as a local escort. In December 1941, she was reassigned to Newfoundland Command, escorting convoys between St. John's and Iceland. During her time with Newfoundland Command she was part of escort groups N14 and N16.

In March 1942, Summerside was assigned to the Western Local Escort Force (WLEF). She was loaned to the Gulf Escort Force in July 1942, before being chosen in October for participation in Operation Torch, the amphibious invasion of French North Africa in the North African campaign. She was sent to the United Kingdom in November where she joined escort group 26L. On 29 October 1942 Summerside along with Rosthern rescued survivors from the crew of the American tanker Pan New York which was torpedoed and damaged by U-624 in the North Atlantic 550 miles (890 km) west of Malin Head at 54-58N, 23-56W. Both warships sank the damaged tanker with gunfire and depth charges. She eventually served with groups 26W, 26G and 62G during her service in Operation Torch.

Summerside returned to Canada in March 1943 and underwent a major refit. She returned to service in December 1943, deploying as an ocean escort as part of the Mid-Ocean Escort Force (MOEF) escort group C-5. She remained with them until April 1944, when she was sent back to the United Kingdom again, this time to Derry. There she was assigned to Western Approaches Command for invasion duties. Summerside was one of 57 RCN warships that participated in Operation Neptune, the code name for the Normandy Landings as part of D-Day (Operation Overlord).

Summerside returned to Canada in Fall 1944, undergoing a refit in October. After workups in Bermuda in March 1945, she sailed once again to the United Kingdom. Once there, she was made a part of escort group 41 under command of the Royal Navy. She worked out of Plymouth until the end of the war.

Summerside was paid off from the RCN on 6 July 1945 at Sorel, Quebec. She was sold for scrap and broken up in June 1946 at Hamilton, Ontario.
