= Aniwa =

Aniwa may refer to:

== Places ==
- A town and village in Shawano County, Wisconsin, in the US:
  - Aniwa (town)
  - Village of Aniwa
- Aniwa Island, an island in Tafea province, Vanuatu

== Ships ==
- USS Aniwa (ID-3146), a US Navy cargo ship in commission from 1918 to 1919

== See also ==
- Aniva
