= HMCS Galt =

Flower-class corvette

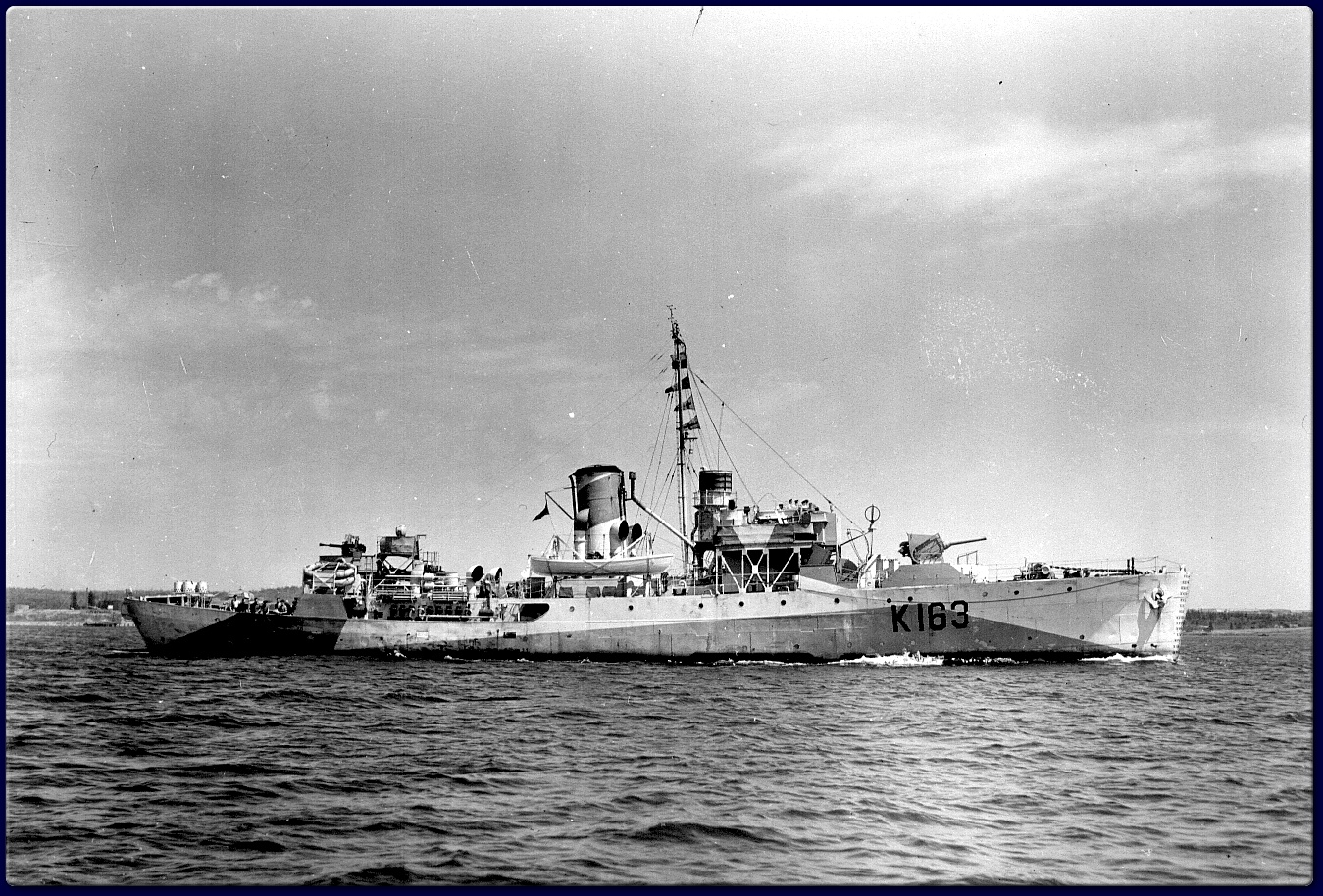
- HMCS Galt circa August 1944, after completion of the foc'sle extension undertaken in New York that started in May 1944.

History

Canada
- Name: Galt
- Namesake: Galt, Ontario
- Ordered: 1 February 1940
- Builder: Collingwood Shipyards, Collingwood
- Laid down: 27 May 1940
- Launched: 28 December 1940
- Commissioned: 15 May 1941
- Out of service: paid off 21 June 1945
- Identification: Pennant number: K163
- Honours and awards: Atlantic 1941-45
- Fate: Scrapped 1946

General characteristics
- Class & type: Flower-class corvette (original)
- Displacement: 925 long tons (940 t; 1,036 short tons)
- Length: 205 ft (62.48 m)o/a
- Beam: 33 ft (10.06 m)
- Draught: 11.5 ft (3.51 m)
- Installed power: 2 × fire tube Scotch boilers; 2,750 ihp (2,050 kW)
- Propulsion: Single shaft; 1 × 4-cycle triple-expansion reciprocating steam engine
- Speed: 16 knots (29.6 km/h)
- Range: 3,500 nautical miles (6,482 km) at 12 knots (22.2 km/h)
- Complement: 85
- Sensors & processing systems: 1 × SW1C or 2C radar; 1 × Type 123A or Type 127DV sonar
- Armament: 1 × BL 4 in (102 mm) Mk.IX single gun; 2 × .50 cal machine gun (twin); 2 × Lewis .303 cal machine gun (twin); 2 × Mk.II depth charge throwers; 2 × depth charge rails with 40 depth charges; Originally fitted with minesweeping gear, later removed

HMCS Galt was a Flower-class corvette of the Royal Canadian Navy that served during the Second World War. She saw action primarily in the Battle of the Atlantic. She was named after the city of Galt, Ontario.

== Background ==
Flower-class corvettes like Galt serving with the Royal Canadian Navy during the Second World War were different from earlier and more traditional sail-driven corvettes. The "corvette" designation was created by the French as a class of small warships; the Royal Navy borrowed the term for a period but discontinued its use in 1877. During the hurried preparations for war in the late 1930s, Winston Churchill reactivated the corvette class, needing a name for smaller ships used in an escort capacity, in this case based on a whaling ship design. The generic name "flower" was used to designate the class of these ships, which – in the Royal Navy – were named after flowering plants.

Corvettes commissioned by the Royal Canadian Navy during the Second World War were named after communities for the most part, to better represent the people who took part in building them. This idea was put forth by Admiral Percy W. Nelles. Sponsors were commonly associated with the community for which the ship was named. Royal Navy corvettes were designed as open sea escorts, while Canadian corvettes were developed for coastal auxiliary roles which was exemplified by their minesweeping gear. Eventually the Canadian corvettes would be modified to allow them to perform better on the open seas.

== Construction ==
She was ordered 1 February 1940 as part of the 1939-1940 Flower-class building program. She was laid down by Collingwood Shipyards at Collingwood, Ontario on 27 May 1940 and was launched on 28 December 1940. Galt was commissioned on 15 May 1941 at Montreal, Quebec.

During her career, Galt had three major refits. The first began in February 1942 at Liverpool, Nova Scotia and took until May of that year to complete. Her second began January 1943, this time begun at Liverpool, but completed at Halifax in mid-April 1943. Her final refit, begun in March 1944 at New York saw Galt's fo'c'sle extended. This took until May 1944 to complete.

== War duty ==
Galt was initially assigned to the Newfoundland Escort Force after workups. Galt escorted six trans-Atlantic convoys without loss before being assigned to Mid-Ocean Escort Force (MOEF) group C3 in June 1942. With group C3, she participated in the battles for convoy ON 115 and convoy SC 109. After a yard overhaul in early 1943, Galt escorted 12 trans-Atlantic convoys without loss before another yard overhaul in January 1944. During that time, she was assigned mainly to MOEF group C1. After that refit, Galt escorted North American coastal convoys with the Western Local Escort Force from July 1944 until May 1945 as part of group W-5.

=== Trans-Atlantic convoys escorted ===
Convoy	Escort Group	Dates	Notes
HX 143		8-17 August 1941	73 ships escorted without loss from Newfoundland to Iceland
SC 41		28 August-6 September 1941	64 ships escorted without loss from Newfoundland to Iceland
ON 12		10-14 September 1941	41 ships escorted without loss from Iceland to Newfoundland
SC 46		25 September-5 October 1941	53 ships escorted without loss from Newfoundland to Iceland
ON 23		10-19 October 1941	26 ships escorted without loss from Iceland to Newfoundland
SC 61		23 December 1941 – 2 January 1942	16 ships escorted without loss from Newfoundland to Iceland
HX 191	MOEF group C3	28 May-5 June 1942	24 ships escorted without loss from Newfoundland to Northern Ireland
ON 104	MOEF group C3	17–27 June 1942	36 ships escorted without loss from Northern Ireland to Newfoundland
SC 90	MOEF group C3	6–15 July 1942	32 ships escorted without loss from Newfoundland to Northern Ireland
ON 115	MOEF group C3	25 July-3 August 1942	Northern Ireland to Newfoundland; 3 ships torpedoed (2 sank)
HX 202	MOEF group C3	11–17 August 1942	43 ships escorted without loss from Newfoundland to Iceland
ON 121	MOEF group C3	17–20 August 1942	34 ships escorted without loss from Iceland to Newfoundland
SC 98	MOEF group C3	1–12 September 1942	69 ships escorted without loss from Newfoundland to Northern Ireland
ON 131	MOEF group C3	19–28 September 1942	54 ships escorted without loss from Northern Ireland to Newfoundland
HX 210	MOEF group C3	7–14 October 1942	36 ships escorted without loss from Newfoundland to Northern Ireland
ON 141	MOEF group C3	26 October-3 November 1942	59 ships escorted without loss from Northern Ireland to Newfoundland
SC 109	MOEF group C3	16–28 November 1942	Newfoundland to Northern Ireland; 2 ships torpedoed (1 sank)
ON 152	MOEF group C3	10–19 December 1942	15 ships escorted without loss from Northern Ireland to Newfoundland
HX 242		6-14 June 1943	61 ships escorted without loss from Newfoundland to Northern Ireland
ON 190		25 June-3 July 1943	87 ships escorted without loss from Northern Ireland to Newfoundland
HX 247		14-19 July 1943	71 ships escorted without loss from Newfoundland to Northern Ireland
ON 195		1-8 August 1943	51 ships escorted without loss from Northern Ireland to Newfoundland
HX 252		20-27 August 1943	52 ships escorted without loss from Newfoundland to Northern Ireland
ON 201		10-18 September 1943	70 ships escorted without loss from Northern Ireland to Newfoundland
HX 258		28 September-5 October 1943	59 ships escorted without loss from Newfoundland to Northern Ireland
ON 207		19-28 October 1943	52 ships escorted without loss from Northern Ireland to Newfoundland
HX 264		5-16 November 1943	65 ships escorted without loss from Newfoundland to Northern Ireland
ON 213		27 November-7 December 1943	60 ships escorted without loss from Northern Ireland to Newfoundland
HX 270		15-25 December 1943	61 ships escorted without loss from Newfoundland to Northern Ireland
ON 219		9-20 January 1944	61 ships escorted without loss from Northern Ireland to Newfoundland

== Post war service ==
Galt was paid off following the end of hostilities on 21 June 1945 at Sorel, Quebec. The ship was sold on 5 October 1945 and was scrapped in 1946 at Hamilton.
