= USS West Gambo =

Cargo ship of the United States Navy

History

United States
- Name: USS West Gambo
- Builder: Skinner and Eddy Corporation, Seattle, Washington
- Launched: 4 July 1918
- Completed: July 1918
- Acquired: 20 July 1918
- Commissioned: 20 July 1918
- Decommissioned: 17 January 1919
- Fate: Transferred to United States Shipping Board 17 January 1919
- Notes: Operated as commercial cargo ship SS West Gambo 1919-1941 and SS Empire Hartebeeste 1941-1942; Torpedoed and sunk 20 September 1942

General characteristics
- Type: Design 1013 ship (cargo ship)
- Displacement: 12,225 tons
- Length: 423 ft 9 in (129.16 m)
- Beam: 54 ft 0 in (16.46 m)
- Draft: 24 ft 2 in (7.37 m) (mean)
- Propulsion: Steam engine
- Speed: 10.5 knots
- Complement: 103
- Armament: none

USS West Gambo (ID-3220) was a steel-hulled, single-screw cargo ship that served in the United States Navy from 1918 to 1919. She later saw commercial service as SS West Gambo and SS Empire Hartebeeste, and under the latter name was sunk during World War II.

== Construction acquisition, and commissioning ==
SS West Gambo was built under a United States Shipping Board contract in 1918 Seattle, Washington, by the Skinner and Eddy Corporation. She was launched on 4 July 1918 and acquired by the U.S. Navy on 20 July 1918 for World War I service, assigned the naval registry Identification Number (Id. No.) 3220, and commissioned the same day as USS West Gambo.

== United States Navy service ==
Assigned to the Naval Overseas Transportation Service, West Gambo departed Seattle on 30 July 1918 bound for Port Costa, California, where she loaded a full cargo of flour consigned to the American Red Cross. After transiting the Panama Canal, she arrived at New York City on 31 August 1918.

West Gambo departed New York in convoy for Russia with her cargo of flour on 18 September 1918 and reached Archangel in North Russia on 12 October 1918. While she was there, Archangel was suffering through an outbreak of influenza, and the hospital corpsman aboard cargo ship USS Aniwa (ID-3146), also unloading at Archangel, fell ill along with other members of Aniwa's crew. West Gambo's ship's doctor joined the ship's doctor of cruiser USS Olympia (Cruiser No. 6) in going aboard Aniwa and tending to her sick crew members.

West Gambo was unloaded by 2 November 1918, and on that day she departed for Glasgow, Scotland. After calling there, she departed for the United States. She made port at New York City on 13 December 1918 and was soon placed in line for demobilization. She was decommissioned on 17 January 1919 and transferred to the U.S. Shipping Board the same day.

== Later career ==
As SS West Gambo, the ship remained in the custody of the U.S. Shipping Board until sold to the Lykes Brothers Steamship Company in late 1936 or early 1937. In 1941, the British government's Ministry of War Transport acquired the ship for World War II service in response to the United Kingdom's need for merchant ships to replace ships sunk in the Battle of the Atlantic. Renamed SS Empire Hartebeeste, she was managed in British service by Watts, Watts and Company of London.

On 20 September 1942, while steaming as a part of Convoy SC 100, Empire Hartebeeste was torpedoed and sunk by the German submarine U-596 in the North Atlantic Ocean at position 56°20′N 38°10′W. All 46 crew were rescued by Norhauk and Rio Grande.
