= HMCS Woodstock =

Flower-class corvette

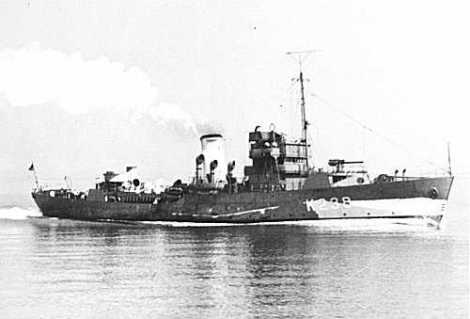
- HMCS Woodstock

History

Canada
- Name: Woodstock
- Namesake: Woodstock, Ontario
- Builder: Collingwood Shipyards Ltd., Collingwood
- Laid down: 23 May 1941
- Launched: 10 December 1941
- Commissioned: 1 May 1942
- Decommissioned: 27 January 1945
- Identification: Pennant number: K238
- Honours and awards: Atlantic 1942–1944, North Africa 1942-43, Normandy 1944, English Channel 1944, Gulf of St. Lawrence 1944
- Fate: Sold for mercantile use 1948, scrapped 1975

General characteristics
- Class & type: Flower-class corvette (Revised)
- Displacement: 925 long tons (940 t)
- Length: 205 ft (62.48 m)o/a
- Beam: 33 ft (10.06 m)
- Draught: 11.5 ft (3.51 m)
- Installed power: 2,750 ihp (2,050 kW); 2 × water-tube boilers
- Propulsion: 1 shaft; 1 × double acting triple-expansion reciprocating steam engine
- Speed: 16 knots (30 km/h; 18 mph)
- Range: 3,500 nautical miles (6,500 km; 4,000 mi) at 12 knots (22 km/h; 14 mph)
- Complement: 85
- Sensors & processing systems: 1 × SW1C or 2C radar; 1 × Type 123A or Type 127DV sonar
- Armament: 1 × BL 4-inch (101.6 mm) Mk.IX gun; 2 × .50 cal machine gun (twin); 2 × Lewis .303 cal machine gun (twin); 2 × Mk.II depth charge throwers; 2 × depth charge rails with 40 depth charges

HMCS Woodstock was a Royal Canadian Navy revised Flower-class corvette that took part in convoy escort duties during the Second World War. She fought primarily in the Battle of the Atlantic. She was named for Woodstock, Ontario.

== Background ==
Flower-class corvettes like Woodstock serving with the Royal Canadian Navy during the Second World War were different from earlier and more traditional sail-driven corvettes. The "corvette" designation was created by the French as a class of small warships; the Royal Navy borrowed the term for a period but discontinued its use in 1877. During the hurried preparations for war in the late 1930s, Winston Churchill reactivated the corvette class, needing a name for smaller ships used in an escort capacity, in this case based on a whaling ship design. The generic name "flower" was used to designate the class of these ships, which – in the Royal Navy – were named after flowering plants.

Corvettes commissioned by the Royal Canadian Navy during the Second World War were named after communities for the most part, to better represent the people who took part in building them. This idea was put forth by Admiral Percy W. Nelles. Sponsors were commonly associated with the community for which the ship was named. Royal Navy corvettes were designed as open sea escorts, while Canadian corvettes were developed for coastal auxiliary roles, as exemplified by their minesweeping gear. Eventually the Canadian corvettes were modified to allow them to perform better on the open seas.

== Construction ==
Woodstock was ordered as part of the Revised 1940–41 Flower class building program. This revised program radically changed the look of the Flower-class corvette. The ships of this program kept the water-tube boilers of the initial 1940–41 program, but now they were housed in separate compartments for safety. The forecastle was extended, which allowed more space for berths for the crew, leading to an expansion of the crew. The bow had increased flare for better control in heavy seas. The revised Flowers of the RCN received an additional two depth charge throwers fitted amidships and more depth charges. They also came with heavier secondary armament with 20-mm anti-aircraft guns carried on the extended bridge wings. All this led to an increase in displacement, draught and length.

Woodstock was laid down by Collingwood Shipyards Ltd. at Collingwood 23 May 1941 and launched 10 December 1941. She was commissioned 1 May 1942. During her career Woodstock had three significant refits. The first took place on the Humber in the United Kingdom. It began in September 1942 and took six weeks to finish. Her second major overhaul began in June 1943 at Liverpool, Nova Scotia, and was completed at Halifax in mid-September. Her final refit took place again at Liverpool beginning in September 1944 and taking two months to complete.

== War service ==
After arriving at Halifax 23 May 1942, Woodstock was initially assigned to the Western Local Escort Force (WLEF). However she was quickly allocated to Operation Torch, the Allied invasion of North Africa. She arrived at Derry 23 September and began refitting. While performing duties associated with Operation Torch, Woodstock sank the motor torpedo boat MTB 105 250 miles northwest of the Azores. Woodstock did so after the merchant ship carrying the boat had been sunk.

Woodstock returned to Canada in March 1943 and in April joined the Mid-Ocean Escort Force (MOEF). She was assigned to escort group C-1 as a trans-Atlantic escort until June, when she was reassigned to EG 5 of the Western Support Force out of St. John's. Late in June she was sent to join MOEF group C-4 for one round trip across the Atlantic before departing for a refit.

After returning from refit Woodstock rejoined MOEF group C-4 until April 1944 when she was made part of Operation Neptune, the naval component of the Allied invasion of Normandy. On D-day, she supported the American landings at Omaha Beach. She was employed on duties connected to this operation for three months before departing for a refit in Canada.

After completing her refit, Woodstock departed for the west coast on 18 October 1944 and arrived at Esquimalt in November. She was assigned to Esquimalt Force upon arrival. She remained with this force for the remainder of her career.

== Post-war service ==
Woodstock was paid off 27 January 1945 from the Royal Canadian Navy as a warship and was sent to the yard for conversion as a loop-layer. On 17 May 1945 she was recommissioned as a weather ship and served as such until her final paying off 16 March 1946.

She was sold for conversion to a whale-catcher in 1948 and reappeared as the Honduran-flagged Olympic Winner in 1951. She was sold and renamed Otori Maru No.20 in 1956 and Akitsu Maru in 1957. She was broken up in Etajima, Japan in May 1975 by Furusawa Steel Co Ltd.
