= SS Norhauk =

1919 cargo ship

History
- Name: Waban (1919–40); Empire Sambar (1940–41); Empire Beaver (1941–42); Norhauk (1942–43)
- Owner: USSB (1919–40); Ministry of Shipping (1940–41); Ministry of War Transport (1941–42); Norwegian Government (1942–43)
- Operator: USSB (1919–33); Lykes Brothers-Ripley Steamship Co Inc (1933–40); Runciman (Shipping) Ltd (1940–41); The Norwegian Shipping & Trade Mission
- Port of registry: (United States) Vancouver (1919–40); (United Kingdom) London (1940–42); (Norway) Oslo (1942–43)
- Builder: G M Standifer Construction Corp, Vancouver, Washington
- Yard number: 3
- Launched: 17 April 1919
- Christened: Waban
- Completed: 15 October 1919
- Identification: US Official Number 218222 (1919–40); UK Official Number 167511 (1940–42); Code Letters LRKN (1919–33); Code Letters WBCD (1933–40); Code Letters GLSJ (1940–42); Code Letters LNAH (1942–43)
- Fate: Struck a mine and sank, 21 December 1943

General characteristics
- Tonnage: 6,083 GRT; 9,193 DWT; 3,749 NRT
- Length: 401 ft 4 in (122.33 m)
- Beam: 53 ft 2 in (16.21 m)
- Depth: 32 ft (9.75 m)
- Propulsion: One triple expansion steam engine, 359 hp (268 kW)
- Speed: 11 knots (20 km/h)

Location of the sinking of Norhauk.

Norhauk was a 6,086 GRT refrigerated cargo ship which was built to Design 1015 by G. M. Standifer Construction Company, Vancouver, Washington in 1919 as Waban for the United States Shipping Board (USSB). After service with Lykes Brothers-Ripley Steamship Co Inc she was transferred to the Ministry of Shipping (later the Ministry of War Transport (MoWT)) in 1940 and renamed Empire Sambar. A boiler-room explosion damaged her in 1941. After repairs she was renamed Empire Beaver. She was transferred to the Norwegian Government in 1942 and renamed Norhauk, serving until she struck a mine and sank in December 1943.

== Description ==
Waban was built to Design 1015 by G. M. Standifer Construction Company, Vancouver, Washington. She was built to Design 1015 and was yard number 3. Waban was launched on 17 April 1919 and completed in October that year. She was 401 feet 4 inches (122.33 m) long, with a beam of 58 feet 2 inches (17.73 m) and a depth of 32 feet (9.75 m). Her GRT was 6,048 with a DWT of 9,193 and a NRT of 3,749.

== Career ==
=== Waban ===
Waban was built for the USSB. On 14 January 1932, Waban was in collision with El Oceano in the Houston Channel, Texas. The weather at the time was foggy. Both vessels sustained severe damage. Waban served with the USSB until 1933 when she was sold to Lykes Brothers-Ripley Steamship Co Inc. Her port of registry was Portland, Oregon. In 1933, Waban was employed in the transportation of cotton from the United States to France. Dr J B Howell recalled that he paid $75 to sail on Waban on one voyage from Galveston, Texas to Le Havre, France. On 28 January 1940, Waban was detained in Gibraltar while on a voyage to Italy and Greece. She was released after an item of her cargo was seized as contraband and 34 of her crew had been detained.

=== Empire Sambar ===
In 1940, Waban was sold to the Ministry of Shipping (later the MoWT) and renamed Empire Sambar. She was placed under the management of Runciman (London) Ltd and her port of registry was changed to London. Empire Sambar was a member of a number of convoys.

SC 3

Convoy SC 3, departed from Sydney, Nova Scotia on 2 September 1940 and arrived at Liverpool on 18 September. Empire Sambar was carrying a cargo of pig iron, bound for Grangemouth.

On 6 March 1941, Empire Sambar was damaged by an explosion in her boiler room.

=== Empire Beaver ===
Following repairs, Empire Sambar was renamed Empire Beaver. Empire Beaver was a member of a number of convoys.

SC 67

Convoy SC 67 departed Halifax, Nova Scotia on 30 January 1942 and arrived at Liverpool on 15 February. Empire Beaver left the convoy and returned to Halifax, later joining Convoy SC 70.

SC 70

Convoy SC 70 departed Halifax on 16 February 1942 and arrived at Liverpool on 7 March. Empire Beaver was carrying a general cargo bound for Holyhead and Liverpool.

=== Norhauk ===
On 5 April 1942, Empire Beaver was transferred to the Norwegian government-in-exile and renamed Norhauk. She was operated under the management of The Norwegian Shipping and Trade Mission. Her port of registry was changed to Oslo, despite that the city was occupied by Germany at the time. Norhauk was a member of a number of convoys.

ON 86

Convoy ON 86 departed Liverpool on 14 April 1942 and arrived at Cape Cod on 29 April. Norhauk was bound for Philadelphia. Norhauk departed New York on 2 May and arrived at Philadelphia on 3 May. On 20 May she sailed from Philadelphia for New York from where she sailed on 27 May for Sydney, Nova Scotia, arriving on 5 June.

SC 86

Convoy SC 86 sailed from Sydney on 5 June and arrived at Liverpool on 20 June. Norhauk was carrying a general cargo.

ON 114

Convoy ON 114 sailed from Liverpool on 19 July and dispersed at sea on 4 August. She arrived at New York on 5 August and sailed on 7 August for Philadelphia, arriving on 9 August. On 21 August, Norhauk sailed from Philadelphia for New York, Boston and Halifax, where she arrived on 12 September.

SC 100

Convoy SC 100h sailed from Halifax on 12 September and arrived at Liverpool on 28 September. During the voyage, Norhauk rescued some of the survivors from Empire Hartebeeste which had been torpedoed and sunk by U-596. On 28 September, Norhauk sailed for Loch Ewe, from where she sailed on 30 September for the Methil Roads, arriving on 2 October. The next day she sailed for Gravesend, where she arrived on 5 October. On 4 December, Norhauk sailed from Gravesend for the Methil Roads, where she arrived on 12 December. On 14 December she sailed for Loch Ewe, where she arrived on 18 December.

ON 156

Norhauk was a member of Convoy ON 156' The convoy sailed from Liverpool on 24 December and arrived at New York on 17 January 1943. Having joined the convoy at sea, Norhauk later lost the convoy and put into Halifax, arriving on 9 January. Two days later she sailed for New York and Baltimore, where she arrived on 19 January. On 8 February she sailed for New York, arriving on 13 February.

SC 120

Convoy SC 120 sailed from New York on 13 February and arrived at Liverpool on 5 March. Norhauk was carrying a cargo of bombs and general cargo. On 27 March, Norhauk sailed from Liverpool and anchored in the Mersey.

ONS 2

Convoy ONS 2 sailed from Liverpool on 28 March and arrived at Halifax on 19 April. Norhauk was bound for New York and arrived there on 22 April. ON 28 April she sailed for Baltimore, arriving on 23 April. On 17 May she departed Baltimore for New York via the Hampton Roads, arriving on 20 May. On 23 May, she sailed for Halifax via Boston, arriving on 26 May.

SC 133

Convoy SC 133 sailed from Halifax on 5 June and arrived at Liverpool on 19 June. Norhauk was bound for Gravesend, arriving on 23 June. On 27 15 July she departed Gravesend and anchored off Southend the following day. On 18 July she sailed for Oban, arriving on 22 July.

ONS 14

Convoy ONS 14 sailed from Liverpool on 26 July and arrived at Halifax on 9 August. Norhauk sailed from Oban on 27 July to join the convoy at sea. Seh arrived at New York on 13 August and departed the next day for Philadelphia, arriving the same day. On 5 September she departed Philadelphia for Boston, New York and Halifax, arriving sometime between 7 and 9 September.

SC 142

Convoy SC 142 sailed from Halifax on 15 September and arrived at Liverpool on 29 September. Norhauk was carrying general cargo and was bound for Hull, where she arrived on 3 October. On 17 October she sailed from Hull for Oban, arriving on 22 October.

ONS 21

Convoy ONS 21 sailed from Liverpool on 22 October and arrived at Halifax on 5 November. Norhauk was bound for St John, New Brunswick and arrived on 6 November. On 24 November she sailed for Halifax, arriving on 26 November.

SC 148, WN519, FS1305

Convoy SC 148 departed Halifax on 2 December and arrived at Liverpool on 16 December. She was carrying a cargo comprised 236 tons of aircraft and guns, 727 tons of aluminium, 863 tons of cheese, 111 tons of flour, 627 tons of military vehicles, 60 tons of tank spares, 95 tons of wireless sets and 1,000 tons of zinc. She arrived at Loch Ewe on 16 December and sailed for London the same day. Norhauk joined coastal convoys WN519 and FS 130. At 14:38 on 21 December, Norhauk struck a mine in the Thames Estuary and sank almost immediately. Eleven of her 41 crew were killed. An inquiry into the loss of Norhauk on 6 January 1944 heard that the ship had degaussing equipment fitted and that it was in use at the time she struck the mine. The position of Norhauk is reported to be either 51°30′03″N 01°33′01″E or 51°50′12″N 01°33′14″E

== Official Numbers and Code Letters ==
Official Numbers were a forerunner to IMO Numbers. Waban had the US Official Number 218222 and used the Code Letters LRKN under the USSB. With a change of ownership her Code Letters changed to WBCD. Empire Sambar and Empire Beaver had the UK Official Number 167511 and the Code Letters GLSJ. Norhauk used the Code Letters LNAF.

== Propulsion ==
The ship was propelled by a triple expansion steam engine which had cylinders of 24 1/2 inches (62 cm), 48 1/2 inches (123 cm) and 72 inches (180 cm) diameter by 48 inches (120 cm) stroke. It was built by Hooven, Owens, Rentschler & Company of Hamilton, Ohio. The engine could propel the ship at a speed of 11 knots (20 km/h).
