= Mid-ocean escort force =

World War II anti-submarine initiative

Mid-Ocean Escort Force (MOEF) referred to the organisation of anti-submarine escorts for World War II trade convoys between Canada and Newfoundland, and the British Isles. The allocation of United States, British and Canadian escorts to these convoys reflected preferences of the United States upon United States' declaration of war and the organisation persisted through the winter of 1942–43 despite withdrawal of United States ships from the escort groups. By the summer of 1943, United States Atlantic escorts were focused on the faster CU convoys and the UG convoys between Chesapeake Bay and the Mediterranean Sea; and only British and Canadian escorts remained on the HX, SC and ON convoys.

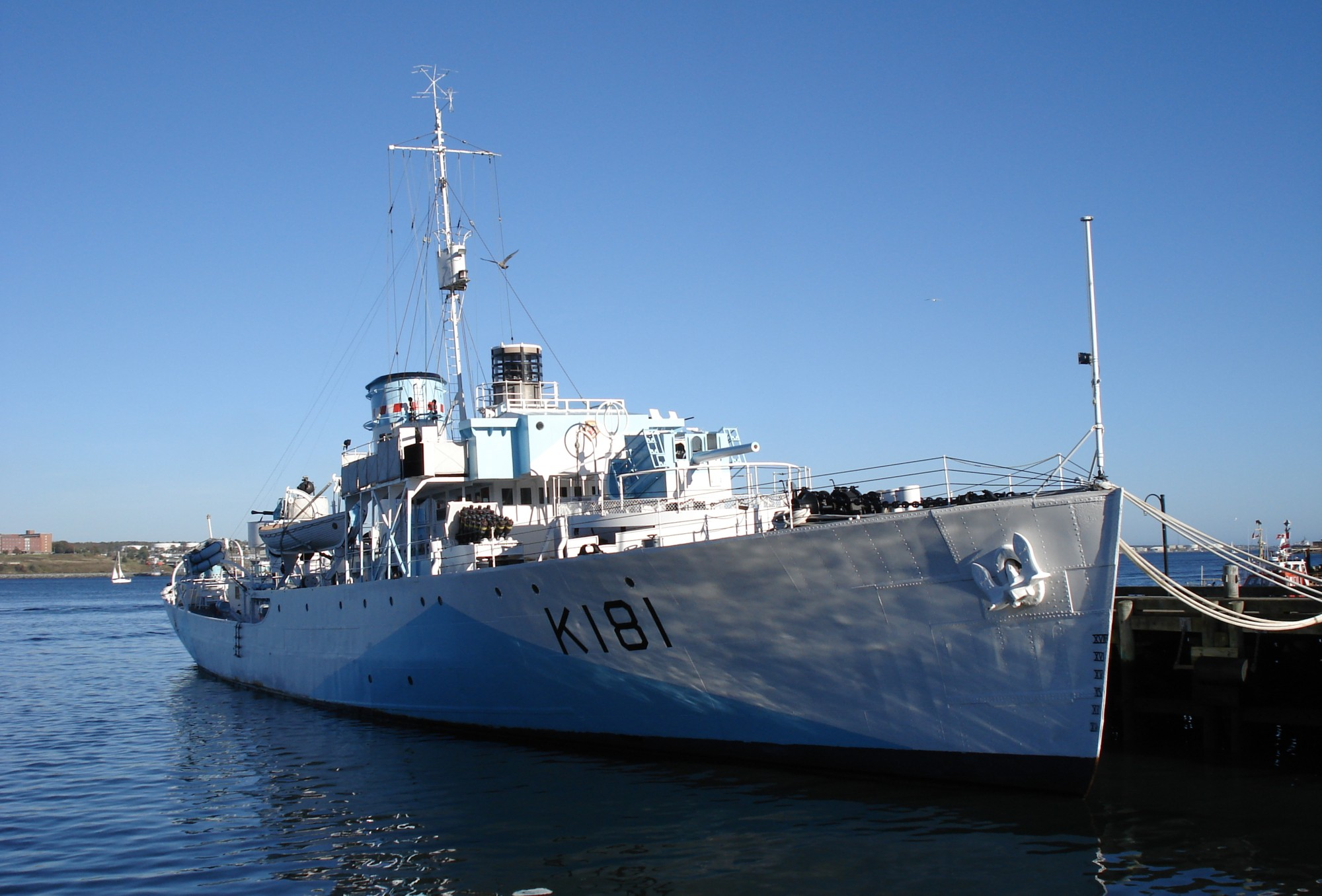
HMCS Sackville, preserved at Halifax Harbour, is believed to be the only survivor of the MOEF Flower-class corvettes

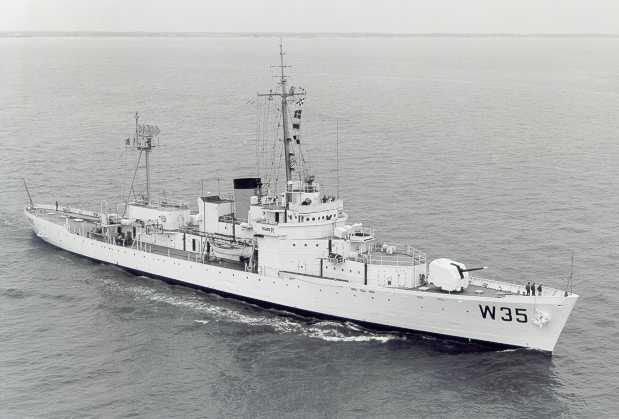
United States Coast Guard cutter Ingham, shown here in a post-war configuration, is one of the few larger MOEF escorts to be preserved

== Background ==
On the basis of experience during World War I, the Admiralty instituted trade convoys in United Kingdom coastal waters from September 1939. Anti-submarine escorts were allocated on the basis of perceived threat. Early German Type II submarines from bases in Germany were unable to operate effectively beyond European coastal waters. Following acquisition of bases in Norway and France, German Type IX submarines and German Type VII submarines refuelled by German Type XIV submarines operated in the mid-Atlantic beyond the range of patrolling aircraft. Many anti-submarine escorts lacked the endurance to accompany convoys through the mid-Atlantic. HX 129 left Halifax on 27 May 1941 as the first convoy to receive escort for the entire trip. Escorts based in Halifax Harbour handed HX 129 off to escorts based in Newfoundland who subsequently transferred HX 129 to escorts based in Iceland who in turn delivered HX 129 to escorts based in the Western Approaches.

== American escorts ==
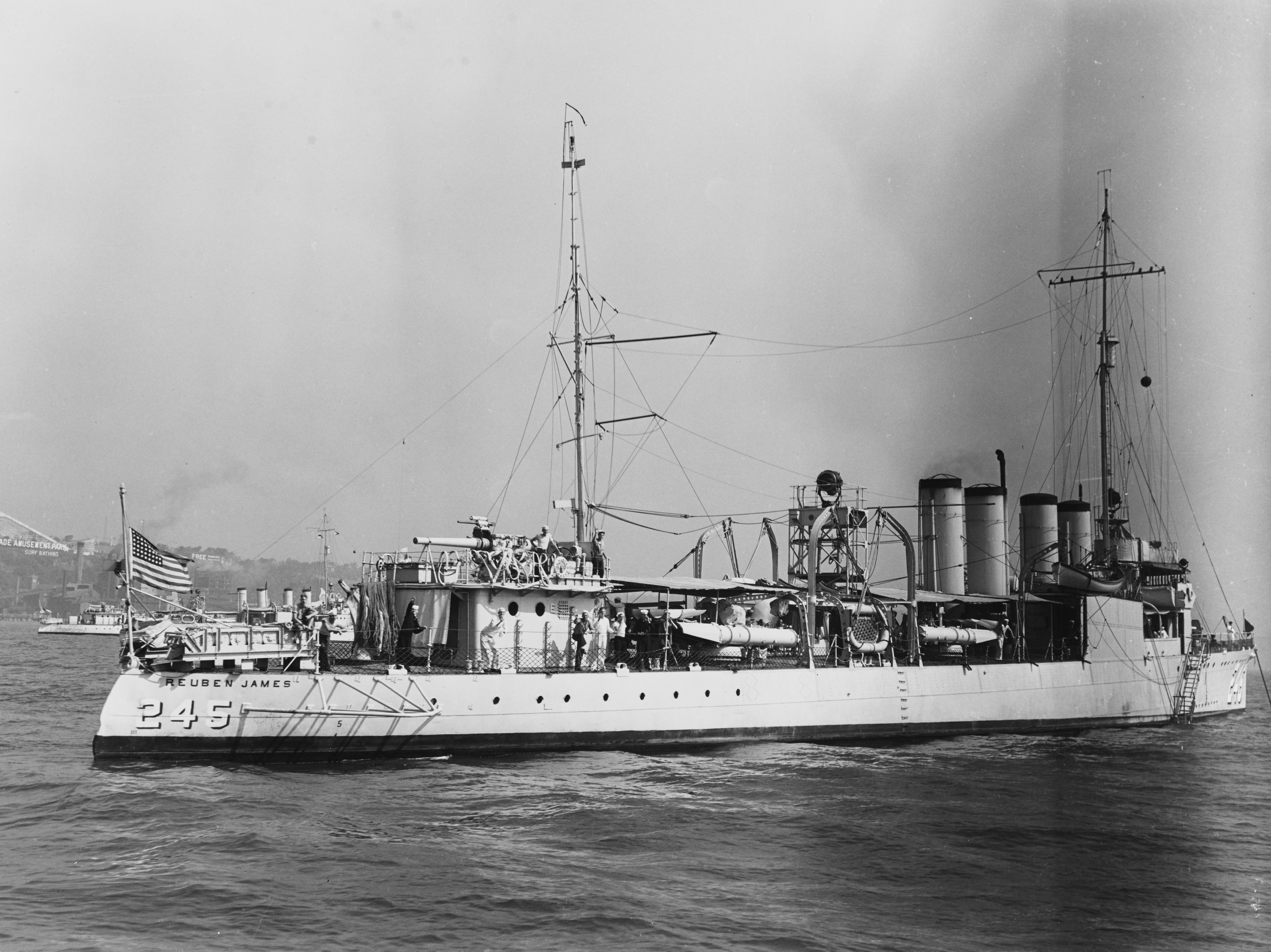
USS Reuben James was sunk while escorting convoy HX 156

In Newfoundland on 9 August 1941, President Franklin D. Roosevelt agreed to provide American destroyers for the Canada to Iceland portion of HX convoys and westbound ON convoys. HX 150 sailed 16 September 1941 as the first convoy with American escort. ON 18 sailed 24 September as the first westbound convoy with American escort. The Royal Canadian Navy continued to escort the SC convoys and their slower ON counterparts. Canadian escort groups were increased from a nominal strength of four ships to six – typically one Canadian River-class destroyer with five Flower-class corvettes.

The Gleaves-class destroyer Kearny was torpedoed while escorting Convoy SC 48 on 17 October 1941. Clemson-class destroyer Reuben James was torpedoed and sunk on 31 October 1941 while escorting Convoy HX 156. When the United States declared war, American escort groups typically contained five destroyers, although six United States Coast Guard Treasury-class cutters were included within the pool of ships rotating in and out of these escort groups.

== Long-range escort organization ==
As the United States Navy struggled to find enough destroyers to meet escort needs for both the Pacific and the vulnerable Atlantic coastal shipping, the shorter great-circle route from Newfoundland to the British Isles was considered as a means of eliminating meeting point delays and reducing the number of destroyers required for escort of convoys between Canada and the United Kingdom. Initial proposals by the United States on 24 January 1942 produced an agreement in early February for a mid-ocean escort force organisation of fourteen escort groups. American-led escort groups were prefixed with the letter "A"; while "B" indicated British-led escort groups and "C" designated Canadian-led escort groups. Fifteen United States destroyers, fifteen Royal Navy destroyers and twelve Canadian destroyers were to provide the striking power of these escort groups while 52 British and 49 Canadian Flower-class corvettes were to perform the patrolling role. Approximately one-third of the theoretical MOEF escort group strength of three destroyers and seven corvettes was unavailable at any given time. Half of the unavailable ships needed storm or battle damage repairs, and the remainder were undergoing normal refit and training.

Each MOEF escort group worked in a 33-day cycle allowing nine and one-half days with a westbound ON convoy, six days in St. John's, Newfoundland and Labrador, nine and one-half days with an eastbound HX or SC convoy, and eight days' refit in Derry. The shorter routing away from Iceland eliminated the need for most escorts to attempt maintenance in Iceland's poorly equipped Hvalfjörður anchorage; but the United States was required to maintain an additional force of five destroyers in Iceland to escort ships between trans-Atlantic convoys and United States military occupation bases. The Royal Navy continued to provide an eastern local escort force of naval trawlers in the Western Approaches while Canada continued to provide a western local escort force (WLEF) of corvettes, minesweepers, and short-range destroyers between Halifax Harbour and Newfoundland.

== Initial MOEF escort group composition ==
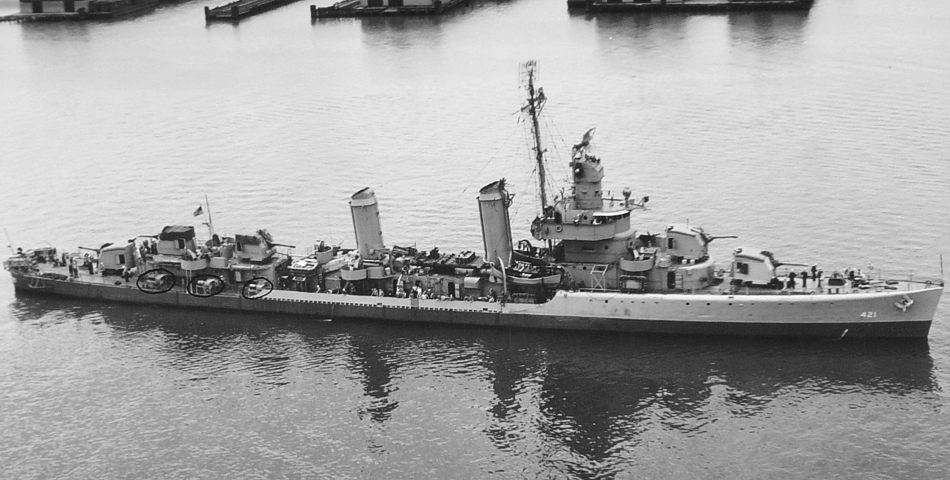
USS Benson was one of the modern United States destroyers initially assigned to MOEF and later diverted to escort troop convoys

- Escort Group A-1: Benson-class destroyer Benson and Clemson-class destroyers Broome, MacLeish and McCormick with Flower-class corvettes Alberni, Collingwood and Hepatica
- Escort Group A-2: Gleaves-class destroyer Niblack and USCG Treasury-class cutter Ingham with Flower-class corvettes Mayflower, Rosthern, Agassiz, Chambly, Barrie and Aconit
- Escort Group A-3: Gleaves-class destroyer Gleaves with USCG Treasury-class cutter Spencer and Flower-class corvettes Bittersweet, Chilliwack, Shediac and Algoma
- Escort Group A-4: Benson-class destroyer Mayo and Clemson-class destroyer Simpson with Flower-class corvettes Impulse, Ready, HNoMS Andenes, Eglantine, Rose and Potentilla, and HMS Mignonette
- Escort Group A-5: Gleaves-class destroyer Bristol and Sims-class destroyer Buck with Flower-class corvettes Kingcup, Loosestrife, Dianella and Roselys
- Escort Group B-1: H-class destroyer Hurricane with Town-class destroyer Rockingham, V-class destroyer Venomous, and Flower-class corvettes Anchusa, Dahlia and Monkshood

The low-endurance destroyer HMS Leamington was an early member of Escort Group B2 later replaced by long-range V & W-class destroyers Vanessa and Whitehall

- Escort Group B2: H-class destroyer Hesperus with Town-class destroyer Leamington, V-class destroyer Veteran, and Flower-class corvettes Clematis, Gentian, Sweetbriar and Vervain
- Escort Group B-3: H-class destroyer Harvester with Town-class destroyer Georgetown, B-class destroyer Bulldog, and Flower-class corvettes Heartsease and Narcissus, Free French Lobelia and Renoncule
- Escort Group B-4: H-class destroyer Highlander with Town-class destroyer Roxborough, W-class destroyer Winchelsea, and Flower-class corvettes Anemone, Pennywort and Asphodel
- Escort Group B-5: H-class destroyer Havelock with Town-class destroyer Caldwell, V- and W-class destroyers Vanoc and Walker, and Flower-class corvettes Pimpernel, Godetia and Saxifrage

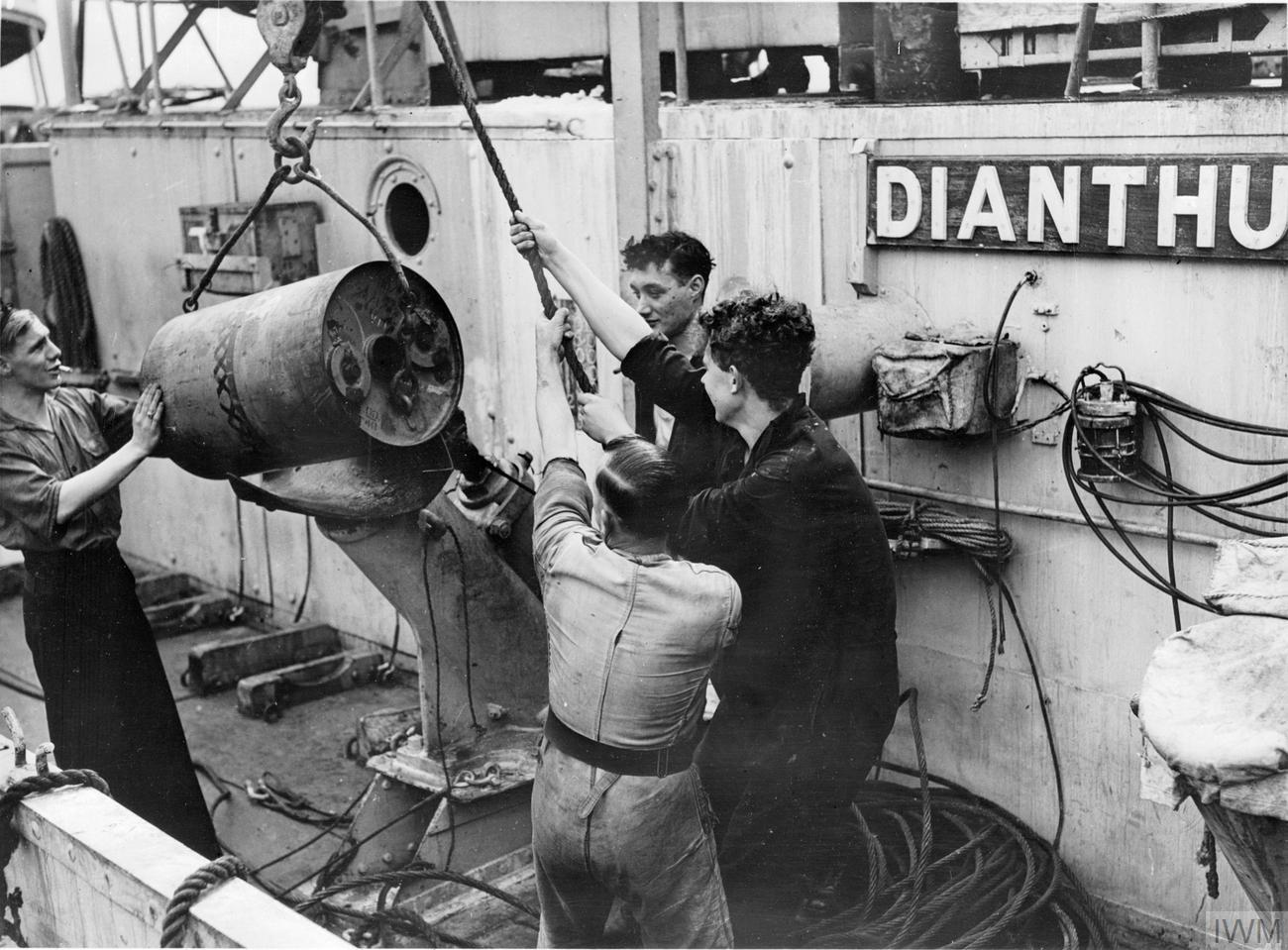
Flower-class corvette HMS Dianthus served with Escort Groups A-3 and C-1

- Escort Group C-1: Canadian River-class destroyer Assiniboine and Town-class destroyer St. Croix with Flower-class corvettes Buctouche, Chambly, Dianthus and Nasturtium
- Escort Group C-2: Canadian River-class destroyer St. Laurent with Town-class destroyer Broadway and Flower-class corvettes Brandon, Drumheller, Morden and Polyanthus
- Escort Group C-3: Canadian River-class destroyers Saguenay and Skeena with Flower-class corvettes Wetaskiwin, Sackville, Galt and Camrose
- Escort Group C-4: Canadian River-class destroyers Ottawa and Restigouche with Town-class destroyer St. Francis and Flower-class corvettes Lethbridge, Prescott, Eyebright and Arvida

== Shortage of destroyers ==
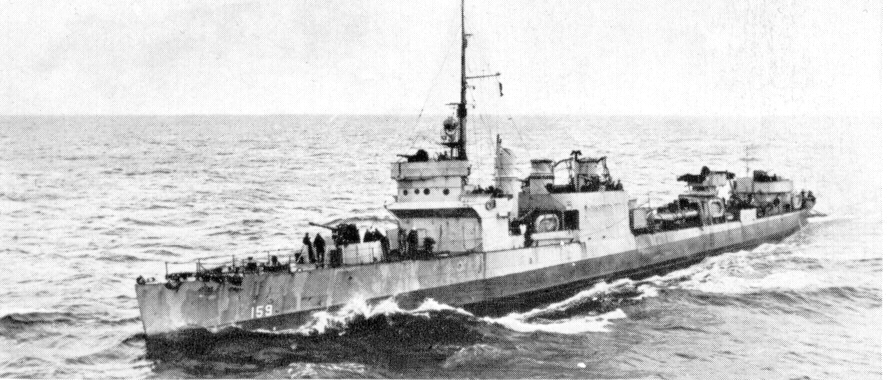
USS Schenck was one of the low-endurance Wickes-class destroyers providing escort to and from Iceland.

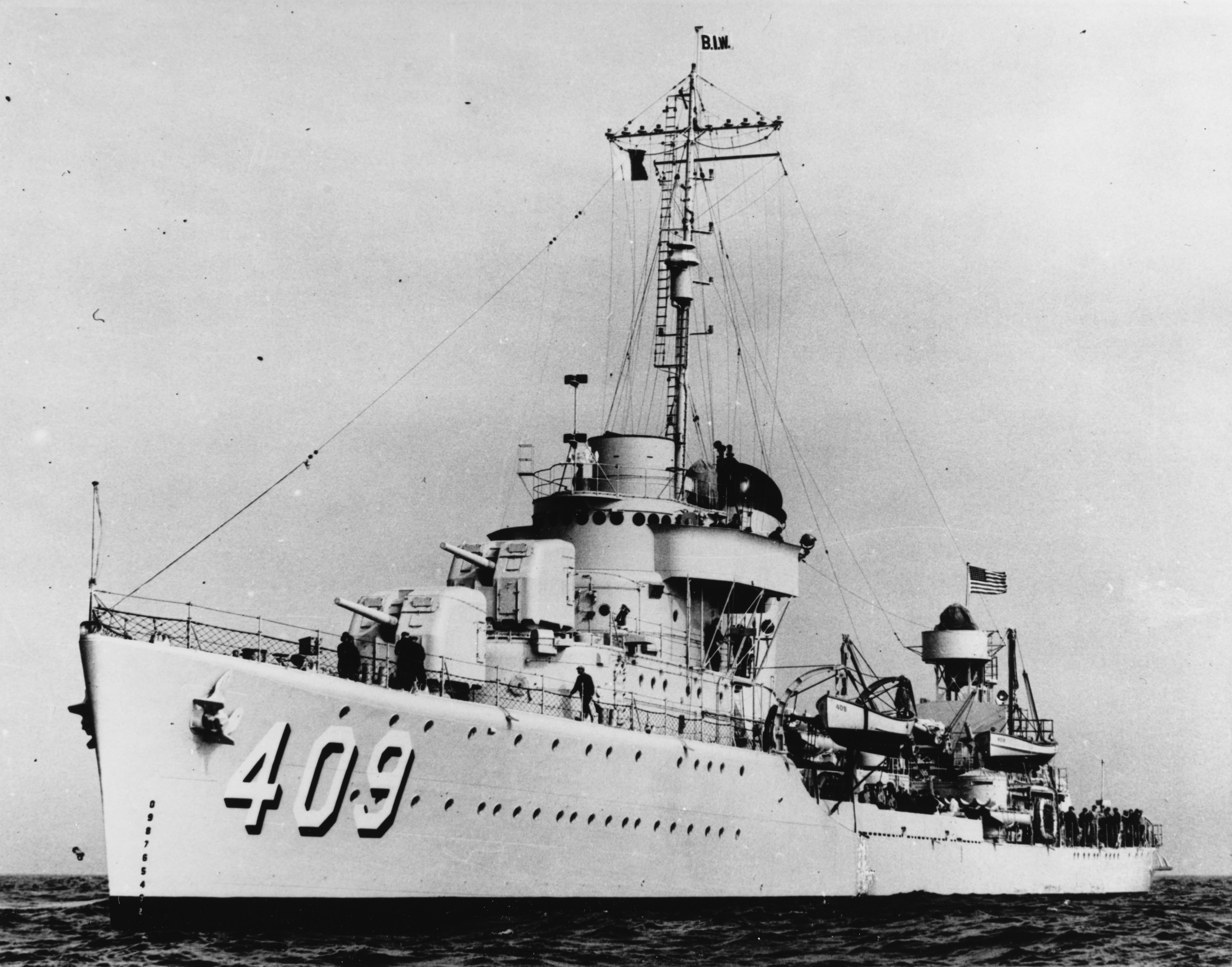
The modern destroyer USS Sims was withdrawn from Iceland in late 1941 to escort USS Yorktown to the Pacific. Sims was sunk at the battle of the Coral Sea on 7 May 1942.

Corvettes had adequate endurance for MOEF assignments, but the fuel economy of destroyers was poor at the speeds that convoys operated. The escort group leaders were modern destroyers with adequate endurance but, of the older destroyers allocated to trade convoy escort, only the Clemson subgroup of the Town-class destroyers proved suitable for MOEF assignments. Wickes-class destroyers were useful for the Canadian WLEF and the American Iceland shuttle; but lacked endurance to stay with a trade convoy for the full distance covered by the MOEF Escort Groups. The Admiralty converted some V and W-class destroyers to long range escorts by removing the forward boiler and using the space for additional fuel tanks.

Nineteen modern American destroyers left the Atlantic to escort the battleships New Mexico, Mississippi, Idaho, and North Carolina and the aircraft carriers Yorktown, Wasp, and Hornet to the Pacific. The remaining American destroyers were diverted from MOEF assignments to troop convoys and in response to the U-boat's Second happy time off the American east coast. Escort Groups A-1 and A-2 were disbanded when their modern American destroyer leaders were assigned elsewhere. Escort Groups A-4 and A-5 were redesignated B6 and B7, respectively, when the Royal Navy assigned F-class destroyers Fame and Firedrake as leaders. Escort Group B5 was reassigned to Caribbean trade convoys in March 1942. Beginning in April, the following eleven groups escorted HX convoys, SC convoys and ON convoys through the winter of 1942–43:

== Escort Group A-3 ==
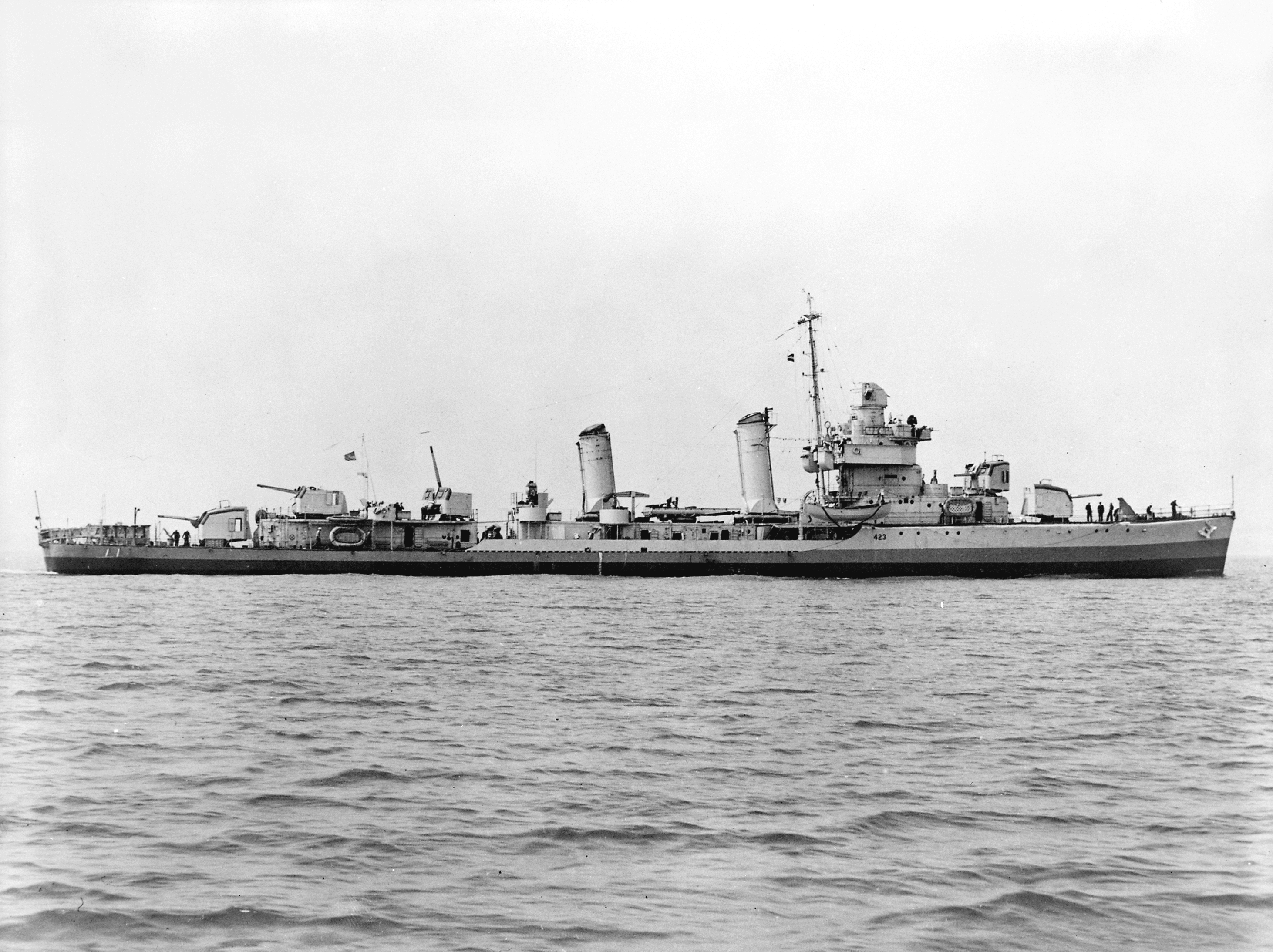
Escort Group A-3 leader USS Gleaves

- Convoy HX 185 was escorted without loss.

Gleaves-class destroyer Gleaves left the escort group after convoy ON 92 lost seven ships. USCG Treasury-class cutters Spencer and Campbell assumed escort leader responsibility. Flower-class corvettes Mayflower and Trillium replaced Flower-class corvettes Chilliwack, Shediac and Algoma.

- Convoy HX 190 was escorted without loss.
- Convoy ON 102 lost one ship torpedoed by U-124.
- Convoys HX 196 and ON 114 were escorted without loss.
- Convoy SC 95 lost one ship torpedoed by U-705.
- Convoy ON 125 was escorted without loss. Flower-class corvette Rosthern joined the group.
- Convoy SC 100 lost three ships torpedoed by U-596, U-617 and U-432.
- Convoys ON 135 and HX 212 were escorted without loss.

Flower-class corvette Dianthus replaced Flower-class corvettes Mayflower and Bittersweet.

- Convoy ON 145 lost one ship torpedoed by U-518.

Flower-class corvette Dauphin rotated into the group.

- Convoys SC 111, ON 156 and HX 223 were escorted without loss.
- Convoy ON 166 lost eleven ships.
- Convoy SC 121 lost seven ships.
- Convoy ON 175 was escorted without loss.
- Convoy HX 233 lost one ship torpedoed by U-628.

The escort group was then redesignated C-5 under Canadian command after the USCG Treasury-class cutters were reassigned for conversion to amphibious force flagships.

== Escort Group B-1 ==
Flower-class corvettes Borage, Meadowsweet and Wallflower joined the group; and Venomous was replaced by the long-range W-class escort Watchman. Convoys HX 187, ON 96, HX 193, ON 108, SC 92, ON 119, HX 201, ON 124, HX 206, ON 134, SC 105, HX 215, ON 151, SC 114, ON 162, SC 119, ON 171 and HX 230 were escorted without loss. Convoy ON 178 lost three ships torpedoed by U-415 and U-191.

== Escort Group B-2 ==
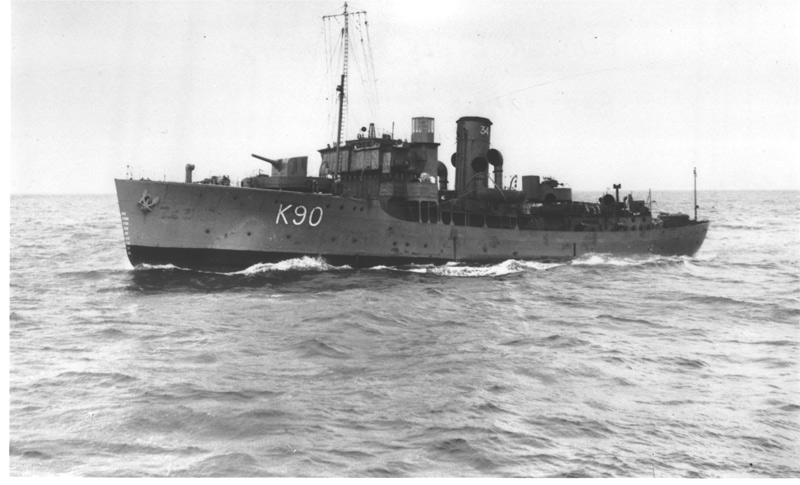
Flower-class corvette HMS Gentian of Escort Group B-2

Flower-class corvettes Campanula, Heather and Mignonette joined the group; and the low-endurance destroyers Leamington and Veteran were replaced by long-range V and W-class escorts Vanessa and Whitehall. Convoys SC 81, ON 97, SC 86, ON 107, HX 198, ON 118, HX 203, ON 128, HX 208, ON 138, HX 213, ON 148, HX 219 and ON 159 were escorted without loss. Convoy SC 118 lost eight ships. Convoys ON 170, SC 123 and ONS 4 were escorted without loss.

== Escort Group B-3 ==
Low-endurance destroyers Georgetown and Bulldog were replaced by the E-class destroyer Escapade and the Polish destroyers Burza and Garland. Flower-class corvette Orchis replaced Heartsease and the four corvettes with Free French crews (Aconit, Lobelia, Renoncule and Roselys) were assigned to this group. Convoys HX 188, ON 98, HX 194, ON 110, SC 93, ON 121, HX 202, ON 126, HX 207, ON 136, SC 106, ON 146, HX 218, ON 157 and SC 117 were escorted without loss. Convoy ON 167 lost two ships. Convoy HX 228 lost four ships torpedoed by U-221, U-757 and U-444. U-444 was rammed by the group leader Harvester. Harvester was then torpedoed by U-432. U-432 was then sunk by Aconit. Thornycroft type leader Keppel was assigned as group leader replacement. Convoy ON 174 was escorted without loss. Convoy HX 232 lost three ships torpedoed by U-563 and U-168.

== Escort Group B-4 ==
Flower-class corvettes Abelia, Clover, Pennywort, and Snowflake joined the group; and the low-endurance destroyer Roxborough was replaced by the Town-class destroyer Beverley. Convoys SC 82, ON 99, SC 87, ON 109, HX 199, ON 120, HX 204 and ON 130 were escorted without loss. Convoy HX 209 lost one ship torpedoed by U-254. Convoys ON 140, HX 214, ON 150, HX 220, ON 161 and ON 169 were escorted without loss. Convoy HX 229 lost twelve ships. Convoy ON 176 lost one ship and Beverley was torpedoed by U-188. Convoy HX 234 lost one ship torpedoed by U-306.

== Escort Group B-6 ==
The Royal Norwegian Navy-crewed Flower-class corvettes Andenes, Eglantine, Rose, Potentilla, and Montbretia from Escort Group A4, and the new leader F-class destroyer Fame were joined by the V-class Viscount (which had been reconstructed as a long range escort), the Town-class destroyer Ramsey, and the British Flower-class corvettes Kingcup and Vervain. Convoys SC 83, ON 101, SC 88, ON 111 and HX 200 were escorted without loss. Convoy ON 122 lost four ships torpedoed by U-605, U-176 and U-438. Convoys HX 205 and ON 132 were escorted without loss. Convoy SC 104 lost seven ships. Convoy ON 144 lost five ships torpedoed by U-264, U-184 and U-624. Montbretia was torpedoed by U-262. Convoy HX 217 lost two ships torpedoed by U-524 and U-553. Convoys ON 155, SC 116, ON 165, HX 227, ONS 1 and SC 125 were escorted without loss.

== Escort Group B-7 ==
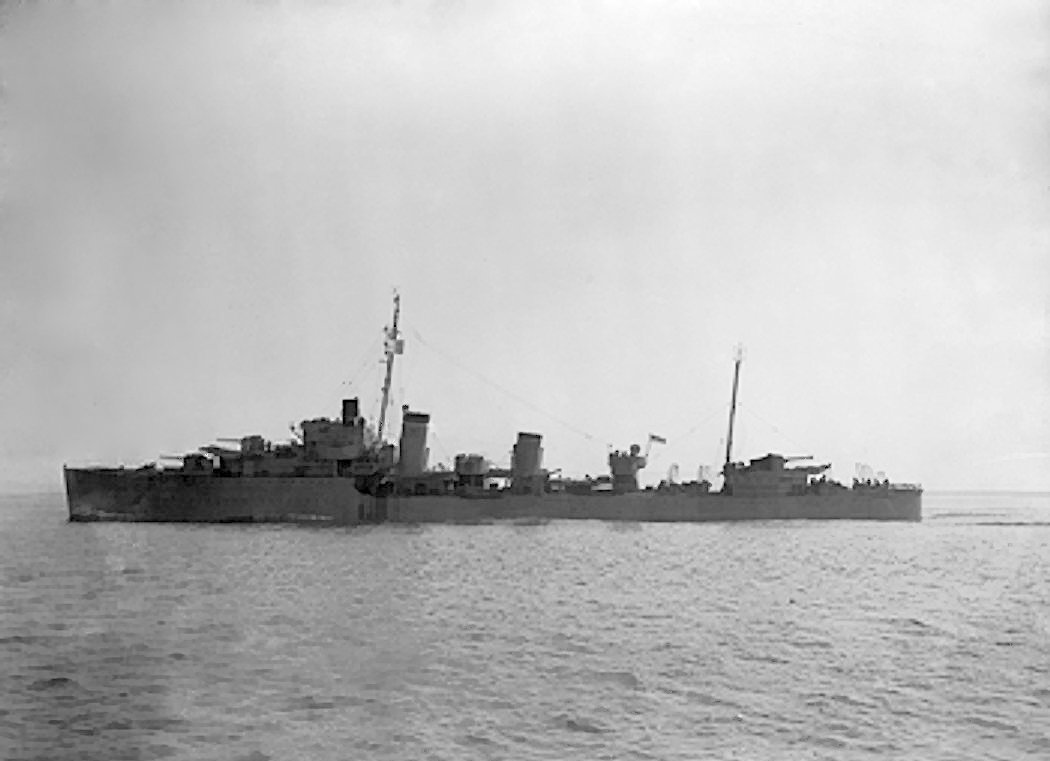
Escort Group B7 leader HMS Duncan

The Flower-class corvette Loosestrife from Escort Group A-5, and the new leader F-class destroyer Firedrake were joined by the Town-class destroyers Chesterfield and Ripley and by the Flower-class corvettes Alisma, Coreopsis, Jonquil, Pink and Sunflower. Convoys HX 186, ON 94, HX 192, ON 106, SC 91, ON 117, SC 103, ON 142 and HX 216 were escorted without loss. Convoy ON 153 lost three ships torpedoed by U-610, U-356 and U-621. On 17 December 1942 HMS Firedrake was torpedoed by U-211 and sank. The D-class destroyer HMS Duncan was assigned as replacement group leader; and the new River-class frigate Tay joined the group. Convoys SC 115, ON 164, SC 120 and ON 173 were escorted without loss. Convoy HX 231 lost three ships torpedoed by U-635, U-630 and U-706. Convoy ONS 5 lost eleven ships.

== Escort Group C-1 ==
Corvette Buctouche was replaced by Flower-class corvettes Battleford, Chilliwack, Orillia and Primrose. Convoy HX 189 was escorted without loss. Convoy ON 100 lost three ships torpedoed by U-94 and U-124. Convoys HX 195 and ON 112 were escorted without loss. Convoy SC 94 lost ten ships. Group leader Assiniboine and Flower-class corvettes Dianthus, Nasturtium and Primrose were replaced by destroyer St. Laurent and Flower-class corvettes Eyebright, Napanee, Kenogami and Shediac. Convoys ON 123, SC 99, ON 133, HX 211, ON 143 and SC 110 were escorted without loss. Flower-class corvettes Orillia, Chambly and Eyebright rotated out of the group. Convoy ON 154 lost thirteen ships. Convoy HX 222 lost one ship torpedoed by U-268. Flower-class corvette Chilliwack was replaced by new River-class frigate Itchen. Convoys ONS 2 and SC 127 were escorted without loss.

== Escort Group C-2 ==
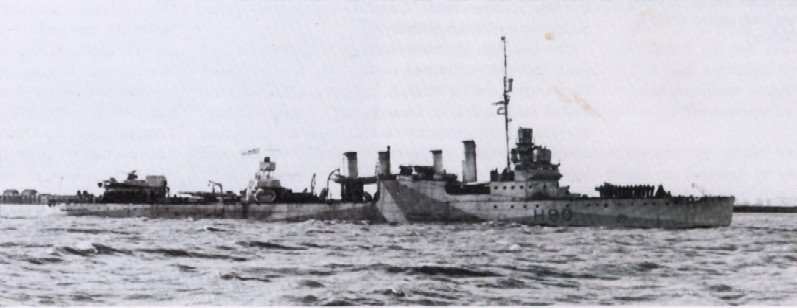
Town-class destroyer HMS Broadway of Escort Group C-2.

Convoys SC 84, ON 103 and SC 89 were escorted without loss. Destroyer Burnham replaced destroyer St. Laurent; and Flower-class corvette Dauphin joined the group. Convoy ON 113 lost three ships torpedoed by U-552, U-607 and U-132 while Town-class destroyer St. Croix sank U-90. Convoys HX 201 and ON 119 were escorted without loss. Convoy SC 97 lost two ships torpedoed by U-609 while Morden sank U-756. Convoys ON 129 and SC 102 were escorted without loss. Destroyer Sherwood replaced destroyer Burnham; and Flower-class corvettes Pictou and Primrose replaced Flower-class corvettes Dauphin and Brandon. Convoy ON 139 lost two ships torpedoed by U-443. Flower-class corvette Orillia joined the group. Convoys SC 108, ON 149 and SC 113 were escorted without loss. New River-class frigates Lagan and Waveney joined the group. Convoys ON 160, HX 225 and ON 179 were escorted without loss.

== Escort Group C-3 ==
Convoys ON 93, HX 191, ON 104 and SC 90 were escorted without loss. Flower-class corvette Camrose was replaced by corvette Agassiz. Convoy ON 115 lost two ships torpedoed by U-552 and U-553 while Skeena and Flower-class corvette Wetaskiwin sank U-588. Convoys HX 202, ON 121, SC 98, ON 131, HX 210 and ON 141 were escorted without loss. Convoy SC 109 lost one ship torpedoed by U-43 and Saguenay was irreparably damaged when depth charges blew off its stern following a collision. Town-class destroyer Burnham replaced Saguenay. Flower-class corvettes Wetaskiwin, Sackville, Galt and Agassiz were replaced by corvettes Bittersweet, Eyebright, La Malbaie and Mayflower. The new River-class frigate Jed joined the group. Convoys ON 152, HX 221, ON 163, HX 226, ON 172, SC 124 and ON 180 were escorted without loss.

== Escort Group C-4 ==
Convoys ON 95, SC 85, ON 105, HX 197, ON 116 and SC 96 were escorted without loss. Destroyer St. Francis was replaced by Town-class destroyer St. Croix and Flower-class corvettes Lethbridge, Prescott and Eyebright were replaced by corvettes Amherst, Celandine and Sherbrooke. Convoy ON 127 lost six ships; and Ottawa was torpedoed by U-91. Convoys SC 101 and ON 137 were escorted without loss. Convoy SC 107 lost fifteen ships. Destroyer St. Croix was replaced by Town-class destroyer Churchill and Flower-class corvette Arvida was replaced by corvettes Brandon and Collingwood. Convoys ON 147, SC 112 and ON 158 were escorted without loss. Convoy HX 224 lost two ships torpedoed by U-456. Convoys ON 177 and HX 235 were escorted without loss.

== Spring of 1943 ==
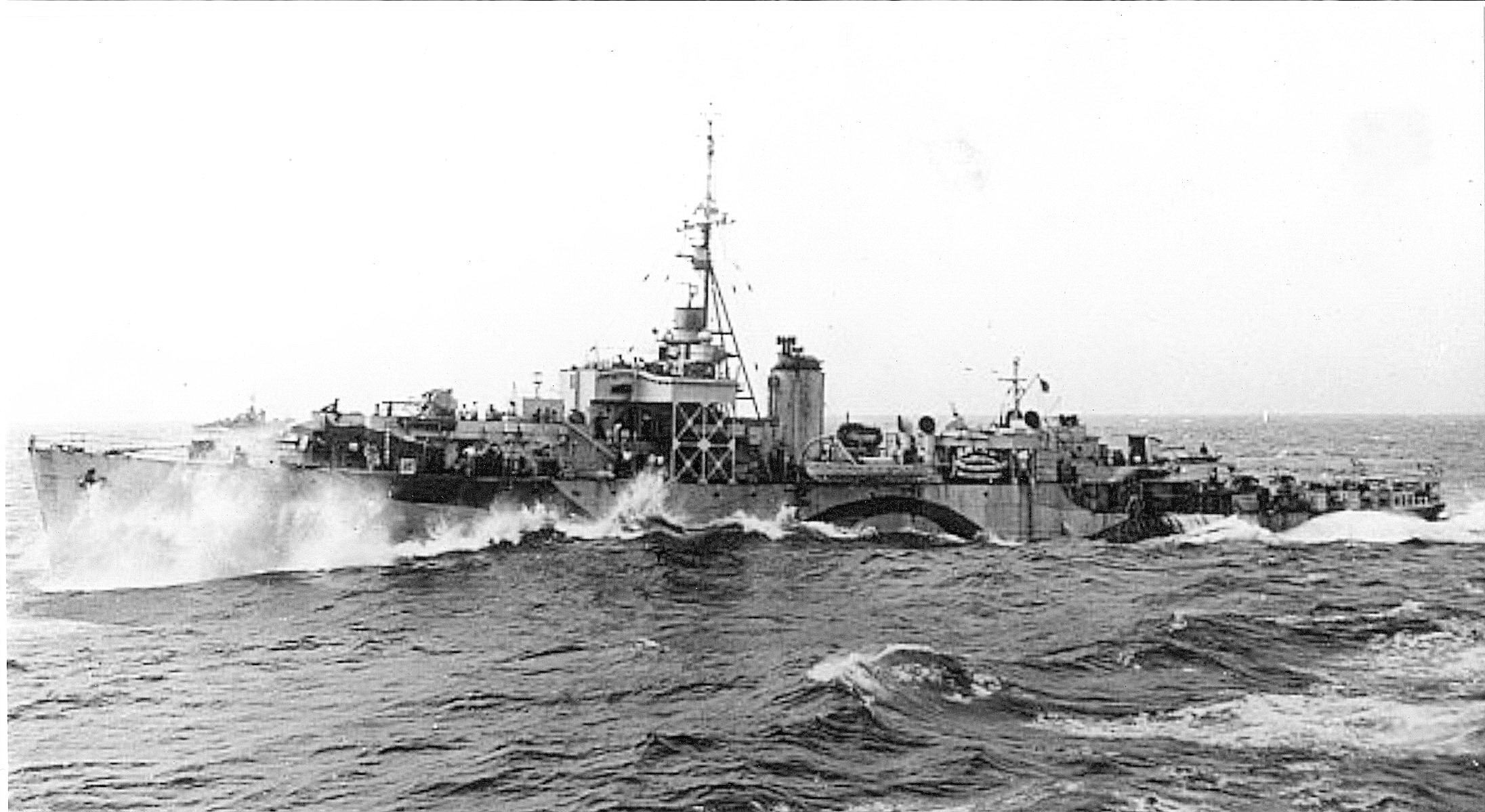
River-class frigate HMS Swale of Escort Group B-5

Escort Group B-5 returned to MOEF with the H-class destroyer Havelock, the Flower-class corvettes Pimpernel, Godetia, Saxifrage, Buttercup and Lavender and with the new River-class frigate Swale replacing the old destroyers. Convoy ON 168 was escorted without loss. Convoy SC 122 lost eight ships. Convoy SC 126 was escorted without loss.

River-class frigates brought two significant advantages to MOEF. Their numbers allowed the older escorts time to refit with modern sensors like 10-centimetre radar and modern anti-submarine weapons like the Hedgehog projector. Destroyers replaced by new frigates were formed into mobile support groups able to move rapidly to convoys coming under attack. Through 1943, new escort carriers became available to increase the surveillance capability of support groups. As the winter weather cleared, new Very Long Range Consolidated B-24 Liberator patrol bombers extended surveillance into the mid-Atlantic.

== See also ==
- Mid-Ocean Meeting Point
- Mid-Atlantic Gap
