= USS Aniwa =

Cargo ship of the United States Navy

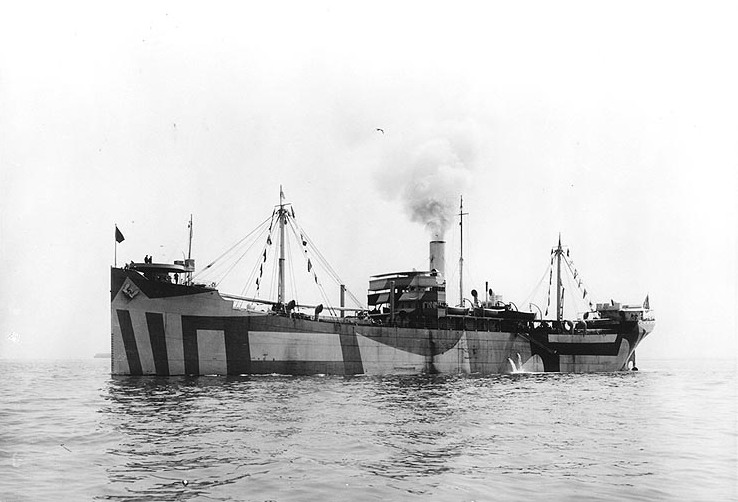
- SS Aniwa on builder's trials on 25 July 1918, the day before she was commissioned as USS Aniwa. She is painted in dazzle camouflage.

History

United States
- Name: USS Aniwa
- Namesake: Aniwa, a village in Wisconsin (Previous name retained)
- Builder: Moore Shipbuilding Company, Oakland, California
- Launched: 14 March 1918
- Completed: 25 July 1918
- Acquired: 26 July 1918
- Commissioned: 26 July 1918
- Decommissioned: 21 April 1919
- Stricken: 21 April 1919
- Fate: Transferred to United States Shipping Board 1919
- Notes: Operated commercially by United States Shipping Board as SS Aniwa from 1919-1923; Laid up 1923; Discarded during fiscal year 1930

General characteristics
- Type: Cargo ship
- Tonnage: 6,165 Gross register tons
- Displacement: 12,700 long tons (12,900 t)
- Length: 416 ft 6 in (126.95 m)
- Beam: 53 ft (16 m)
- Draft: 26 ft 5 in (8.05 m) (mean)
- Installed power: 2,800 ihp (2,100 kW)
- Propulsion: Steam engine, one shaft
- Speed: 10 knots (19 km/h; 12 mph)
- Complement: 70
- Armament: 1 × 6-inch (152-millimeter gun; 1 × 6-pounder gun

USS Aniwa (ID-3146) was a steel-hulled, single-screw cargo ship that served in the United States Navy from 1918 to 1919.

== Construction, acquisition, and commissioning ==
Aniwa was a Design 1015 ship built under a United States Shipping Board contract and completed as SS Aniwa in 1918 at Oakland, California, by the Moore Shipbuilding Company. She was earmarked for U.S. Navy World War I service with the naval registry Identification Number (Id. No.) 3146. She departed her builder's yard for final sea trials on the morning of 25 July 1918 and arrived at San Francisco, California, that afternoon. On the morning of 26 July 1918, Aniwa was commissioned as USS Aniwa.

== United States Navy service ==
=== World War I ===
Aniwa moved to the Mare Island Navy Yard at Vallejo, California, on 27 July 1918 to take on stores and embark the balance of her crew. She moved on to Port Costa, California, on 31 July 1918 and loaded a cargo of flour. Underway for the United States East Coast on 7 August 1918, Aniwa transited the Panama Canal on 23 August 1918 and, after clearing Cristóbal, Panama Canal Zone, early on 24 August 1918, shaped course for New York City. She reached Brooklyn, New York, on the afternoon of 4 September 1918.

Earlier in 1918, United States Ambassador to Russia David R. Francis had urged the sending of shiploads of foodstuffs to Archangel in North Russia for a three-fold purpose: (1) to feed the local Russian population whose flow of provisions had been interrupted by the Czech Legion's occupation of the Trans-Siberian Railway; (2) to provide for the Allied representatives in the city of Vologda, Russia, should they retire northward; and (3) to create a favorable image of the United States in Russia. Accordingly, shortly after midday on 15 September 1918, Aniwa headed out to sea with her cargo of flour in a convoy bound ultimately for Archangel.

Aniwa arrived off the mouth of the Dvina River on 11 October 1918 and ascended the river on 12 October 1918. At 17:45 hours that day she made fast alongside the British merchant ship SS Grofe Castle, which in turn was moored to a wharf at Archangel. Aniwa immediately posted watches bow and stern to protect Aniwa and her cargo. On 14 October 1918, four soldiers—a corporal and three privates—reported to Aniwa to serve as an armed guard.

An outbreak of influenza in Archangel curtailed shore leave for Aniwa's crew during certain periods of the ship's stay there. It even struck Aniwa's hospital corpsman, who had to be sent ashore for treatment in the American Red Cross hospital. To fill the gap created by his illness, the ships' doctors of U.S. Navy cargo ship USS West Gambo (ID-3220) and U.S. Navy cruiser USS Olympia (Cruiser No. 6) visited Aniwa and ministered to her sick.

Unloading operations proceeded nearly without incident. However, on the afternoon of 23 October 1918, two Russian stevedores, obviously feeling the shortage of foodstuffs ashore, were caught trying to leave the ship with small quantities of Aniwa's cargo of flour. Then, on 5 November 1918, a sling broke, dropping a bale of hemp on a Russian stevedore. Fortunately, he was not badly hurt and was soon on his way to a Russian hospital for treatment.

Aniwa got underway for the United States in ballast on the morning of 10 November 1918 with a small number of passengers embarked. World War I ended the following day.

=== Postwar ===
Aniwa reached Brooklyn on 8 December 1918. Shifting to Bush Terminal at Brooklyn soon thereafter, she loaded 6,905 tons of general cargo and underwent a few minor repairs.

Assigned to the Naval Overseas Transportation Service, Aniwa cleared the port of New York shortly after midday on 29 December 1918 bound for Gibraltar. As the days wore on, the weather remained fairly rough, with the ship rolling easily in the long swells, and she took water forward and aft; a leak in the after storeroom occupied the attention of at least one man for nearly an entire day on 7 January 1919. Soon thereafter, problems with her condenser and boilers forced her to put into the Azores on 10 January 1919 for voyage repairs.

Underway again on 28 January 1919, Aniwa reached Gibraltar on 4 February 1919 and remained there for a short while before resuming her voyage to Genoa, Italy, where she arrived on the morning of 11 February 1919.

Inept cargo handling during unloading operations at Genoa caused much damage to the shipment of foodstuffs that Aniwa had carried from New York. Finally, in early March, after having discharged all that she had brought, she took on ammunition from the U.S. Navy tugs USS Nahant (SP-1250) and USS Penobscot (SP-982) for transportation back to the United States, and then loaded ballast for the return trip. She departed Genoa on the morning of 17 March 1919.

After touching briefly at Gibraltar on 23 March 1919 and 24 March 1919 to pick up passengers, Aniwa arrived off Tompkinsville at Staten Island, New York on 15 April 1919. There, she unloaded the ammunition. She soon moved to the pier at East 19th Street in New York City. She was decommissioned there on 21 April 1919, and her name was struck from the Navy List the same day.

== Later career ==
Turned over to the United States Shipping Board for operation, the ship, once again as SS Aniwa, continued carrying cargo, now under civilian auspices. During the remainder of 1919 she called at Mobile, Alabama; Liverpool, England; and Newport News, Virginia.

Aniwa was laid up in 1923 and remained inactive until being discarded due to age and deterioration during the fiscal year 1930.
