= SC convoys =

The SC convoys were a series of North Atlantic convoys that ran during the battle of the Atlantic during World War II.

They were east-bound slow convoys originating in Sydney, Nova Scotia, Canada (designated as Sydney, Cape Breton by the Allied navies to avoid confusion with Sydney, Australia); from there they sailed to ports in the UK, mainly Liverpool. The Royal Canadian Navy base responsible for the Sydney operations was HMCS Protector. The first convoy, SC 1, departed Sydney Harbour on 15 August 1940.

For a time after the entry of the United States into the war the point of origin was switched to New York City, but congestion problems there resulted in a further move, this time to Halifax, Nova Scotia. However, the SC designation was retained throughout.

SC convoys ran from August 1940 until May 1945, although they were suspended during the summer of 1944 when a number of escort groups were diverted to cover the Normandy landings. During this period all east-bound traffic sailed in the HX series, which ran as Fast or Slow convoys, and whose sizes were effectively doubled.

A total of 177 SC convoys ran during the campaign, totalling 6,806 ships. Only 3 failed to complete the passage: SC 52 suffered an attack shortly after leaving port, and was forced to return; and SC 62 and SC 63 were both scattered by appalling weather conditions which forced those ships to proceed independently.

Of these formations, 29 (around 20%) were attacked; they saw the loss of 145 ships ( though this number does not include stragglers, perhaps the same number again) and a further 18 lost in marine accidents (perhaps 340 in total; around 5%).

As these were slow convoys, composed of ships making 8 knots or less, they were correspondingly more vulnerable, and witnessed a disproportionate number of attacks.

The SC convoys were the subject of some of the major battles of the campaign. Of the 40 convoys which lost 6 or more ships, 11 of them were SC series.

Some notable SC convoy battles were:

- SC 7: Attacked in October 1940, 20 ships were sunk in the worst day's shipping losses of the entire campaign.
- SC 42: Two U-boats were sunk by reinforcements coming to the aid of the weak Canadian escort for this September 1941 convoy. 14 ships lost in 3 days.
- SC 48: One of eight U-boats were damaged two warships were sunk one damaged and nine ships were sunk during 14–18 October 1941 convoy. 14 ships lost in 3 days.
- SC 94 in August 1942 marked the beginning of the climactic North Atlantic convoy battles following the 2nd Happy Time off the American east coast.
- SC 104 lost seven ships while Escort Group B6 sank two U-boats in October 1942.
- SC 107 lost 15 ships in November 1942 including five torpedoed by Kapitänleutnant Siegfried von Forstner's U-402.
- SC 118: Attacked in February 1943. Kapitänleutnant Siegfried Freiherr von Forstner was awarded the Knight's Cross of the Iron Cross when his U-402 torpedoed seven ships including Henry R. Mallory transporting American troops to Iceland.
- SC 121: Attacked in March 1943 after being scattered by a Force 10 gale. Only 76 of the 275 crewmen of the sunken ships were rescued.
- SC 122: Attacked in March 1943, this action, which converged with that around HX 229, was the largest convoy battle of the Atlantic campaign.
- SC 130: Attacked in May 1943, this convoy was successfully defended, seeing the destruction of 5 U-boats and the death of Admiral Karl Dönitz's son Peter Dönitz without losing any ships. This action culminated the period known as Black May, which saw the withdrawal from the North Atlantic by the German navy.
