= River-class destroyer (1931) =

Class of destroyers of the Royal Canadian Navy

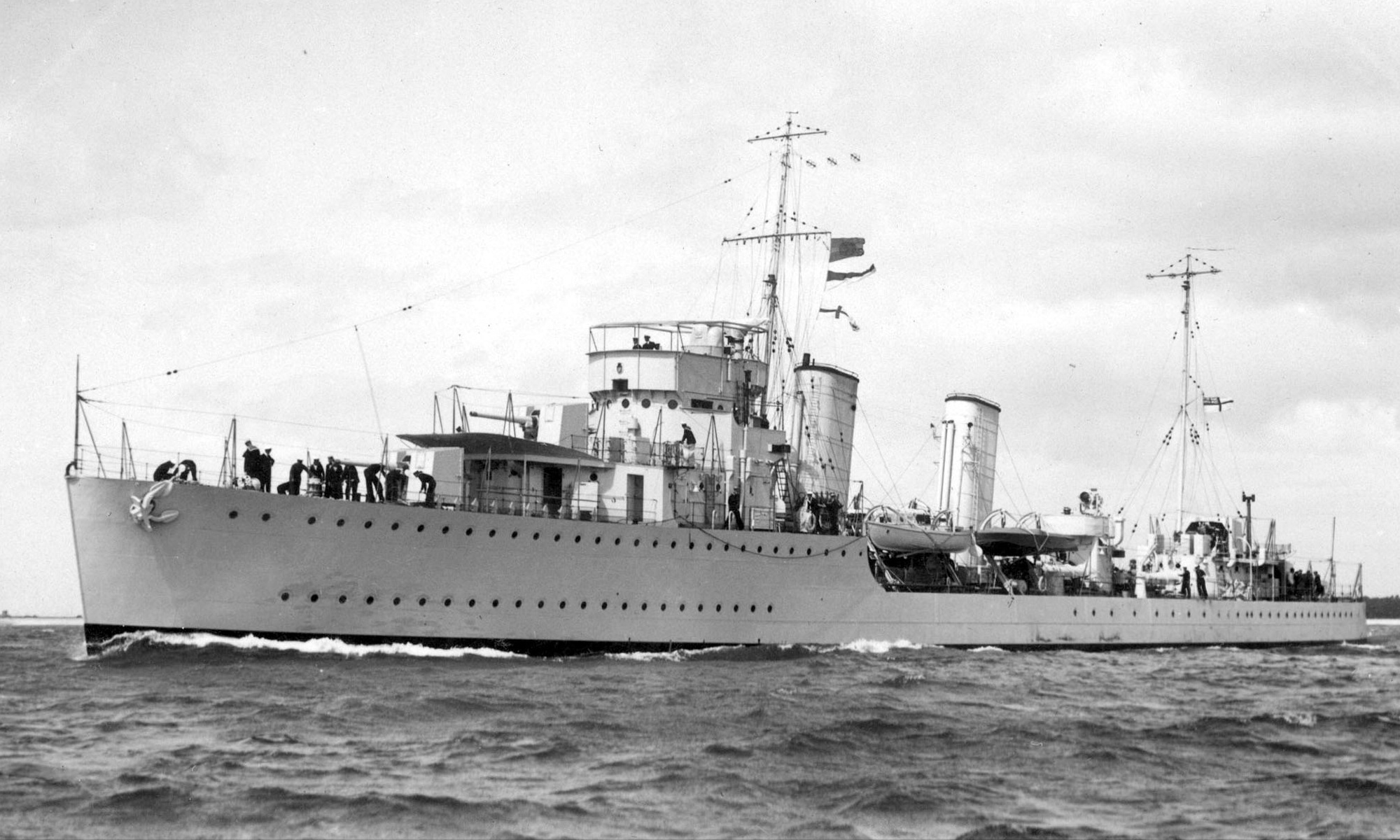
- HMCS Skeena

Class overview
- Operators: Royal Canadian Navy
- In service: 1931–1945
- Completed: 14
- Lost: 4

General characteristics Saguenay & Skeena
- Displacement: 1,337 tons
- Length: 320 ft (98 m)
- Propulsion: 32,000 shp (24,000 kW)
- Speed: 35 knots (65 km/h)
- Range: 5,000 nmi (9,300 km; 5,800 mi) at 15 knots (28 km/h)
- Notes: Other characteristics as per A-class destroyer

The River class was a series of fourteen destroyers of the Royal Canadian Navy (RCN) that served before and during the Second World War. They were named after Canadian rivers.

The River class was a dissimilar collection of warships, consisting of twelve vessels purchased from the Royal Navy and two built specifically by British yards for the RCN. They included two A class, five C class, two D class, one E class, two F class, one G class and one H class.

HMCS Saguenay and HMCS Skeena were the first ships specifically built for the RCN and were adapted from the Royal Navy's A class.

== History ==
The majority of the River-class ships began the Second World War with the same equipment that they were built with; however, this was gradually modified as the war progressed. Modifications included removing gun mounts to make room for additional depth charge and torpedo systems, as well as adding new communications and radar masts. The River class were the backbone of the RCN destroyer fleet and served as leaders of the Mid-Ocean Escort Force during the Battle of the Atlantic. Four of the class were lost and one severely damaged during the war: HMCS Fraser and HMCS Margaree were sunk by collisions in 1940; HMCS Ottawa was torpedoed by U-91 in 1942, and Skeena was driven aground on Viðey Island near Reykjavík, Iceland in 1944. Saguenay lost much of her stern in a November 1942 collision, and was subsequently relegated to training duties. The surviving ships were all decommissioned and scrapped following the war.

=== 1939 ===
On 23 October 1939, the German-flagged tanker Emmy Friederich scuttled herself on encountering Saguenay in the Yucatán Channel.

=== 1940 ===
On 8 March 1940 Assiniboine, along with HMS Dunedin intercepted and captured the German merchant ship Hannover near Jamaica. Hannover was later converted into HMS Audacity.

On the night of 25 June 1940, Fraser was tasked to join the destroyer HMCS Restigouche and light cruiser HMS Calcutta on Operation Aerial to rescue 4,000 refugees trapped by the German Army from the coast of Bordeaux, France. The warships encountered rough seas and poor visibility, forcing the commanding officer of Fraser to close quarters with the other two vessels. Fraser executed a turn to port to bring the ship behind Calcutta but in doing so, the two ships collided. The bow of the heavier Calcutta sliced into Fraser with such force that the destroyer was cut into three pieces. Fraser lost 47 sailors, and a further 19 were lost from Calcutta. Many of the survivors from Fraser transferred that summer to Margaree and were lost when that vessel sank on 22 October 1940 as a result of a collision with the freighter MV Port Fairy.

Margaree was lost on 22 October 1940, when she collided with the freighter MV Port Fairy at position 53°24′N 22°50′W. Of the 176 aboard Margaree at the time, 34 were rescued by Port Fairy, but the other 142, including the captain and four other officers, were lost.

In November, Ottawa assisted HMS Harvester in sinking the Italian submarine Comandante Faà di Bruno.

=== 1942 ===
On 31 July 1942, Skeena and HMCS Wetaskiwin depth charged and sank the German submarine U-588 while escorting ON 115 at 49°59′N 36°36′W.

While escorting convoy SC 94 on 6 August 1942, Assiniboine achieved her first victory when she rammed, depth charged and shelled U-210 south of Cape Farewell, Greenland.

On 14 September 1942, while escorting Convoy ON 127 500 nautical miles (930 km) east of St John's, Newfoundland, Ottawa was torpedoed by U-91. Less than 30 minutes later, unable to maneuver, she was hit by a second torpedo. The second attack broke her in half, sinking her. 114 crew lost their lives, including the commanding officer, while 65 survivors were rescued by nearby vessels.

On 15 November 1942, Saguenay was rammed by the Panamanian freighter Azra off Cape Race, Newfoundland. The impact of the collision set off Saguenay's depth charges, which blew off her stern. She made port at Saint John, New Brunswick, where her stern was plated over. On 23 May 1943, Saguenay was transferred to Halifax, to serve with the Western Ocean Escort Force working from Halifax and St. John's, Newfoundland. In October 1943 Saguenay was towed to Digby, Nova Scotia, as a tender assigned to HMCS Cornwallis, the Royal Canadian Navy's training depot for new entries (recruits). She was used for teaching seamanship and gunnery until 30 July 1945, paid off in late 1945, and broken up in 1946.

St. Laurent had her first victory on 27 December 1942 when she was credited with sinking U-356 while escorting Convoy ON 154 north of the Azores, along with the corvettes HMCS Chilliwack, HMCS Battleford and HMCS Napanee.

=== 1943 ===
On 2 March 1943 Assiniboine was damaged by her own depth charges during a battle with U-119. She made Liverpool on 7 March and took 3 months to repair.

HMCS Saskatchewan, formerly HMS Fortune joined the River class in May 1943. HMCS Gatineau joined in June.

=== 1944 ===
On 6 March 1944 at 1830 hrs, the German U-boat U-744 was sunk in the North Atlantic, in position 52.01°N 22.37°W following a lengthy hunt to exhaustion. It was initially torpedoed by the British I-class destroyer HMS Icarus and an unsuccessful attempt was made at towing the submarine to port. The U-boat was subsequently sunk by depth charges from Icarus, Canadian corvettes HMCS Chilliwack and HMCS Fennel, Canadian frigate HMCS St. Catharines, Canadian destroyers HMCS Chaudière and HMCS Gatineau, and the British corvette HMS Kenilworth Castle.

St. Laurent was credited with the 10 March 1944 sinking of U-845 in the North Atlantic, along with the destroyer HMS Forester, corvette HMCS Owen Sound and frigate HMCS Swansea.

On 6 July 1944, Ottawa and Kootenay were detached from a convoy to assist HMS Statice with a submarine contact off Beachy Head, Sussex. As Ottawa swept the area, she gained sonar contact and attacked with depth charges. Shortly afterward, large amounts of debris appeared on the surface, including caps marked U-678.

On 7 July 1944, Kootenay, Ottawa, and the corvette HMS Statice depth-charged and sank the German VIIC-class U-boat U-678 in the English Channel south-west of Brighton.

On 18 August Kootenay, Ottawa, and Chaudière depth-charged and sank the German VIIC-class U-boat U-621 in the Bay of Biscay near La Rochelle. On 20 August, the same ships depth-charged and sank the German VIIC-class U-boat U-984 in the Bay of Biscay west of Brest.

Skeena was lost in a storm on the night of 24 October 1944. She was anchored off Reykjavík, Iceland and dragged her anchor and grounded in 50-foot (15 m) waves off Viðey Island with the loss of 15 of her crew. Her hulk was written off and sold to Icelandic interests in June 1945; she was then raised and broken up. Her propeller was salvaged and used in a memorial near the Viðey Island ferry terminal.

=== 1945 ===
On 14 February 1945 Assiniboine collided with merchant ship Empire Bond in the English Channel. She made Sheerness for repairs and was operational again in early March.

== Ships ==
Royal Navy Name	Royal Canadian Navy Name	Pennant number	Builder	Laid down	Launched	Completed	Commissioned into RCN	Paid off	Fate
Modified A class
Built for RCN	Saguenay	D79	John I. Thornycroft & Company, Woolston	27 September 1929	11 July 1930	22 May 1931	22 May 1931	30 June 1945	Damaged in a collision 15 November 1942 and de-rated to training ship, sold for breaking 1945
Built for RCN	Skeena	D59	John I. Thornycroft & Company, Woolston	14 October 1929	10 October 1930	10 June 1931	10 June 1931	25 October 1944	Wrecked in Kollafjord, Iceland, 25 October 1944
C class leader
Kempenfelt	Assiniboine	D18 (changed in 1940 to I18)	J. Samuel White, Cowes	18 October 1930	29 October 1931	30 May 1932	19 October 1939	8 August 1945	Wrecked on Prince Edward Island en route for scrapping, 10 November 1945, scrapped 1952
C class
Comet	Restigouche	H00	HM Dockyard, Portsmouth	12 September 1930	30 September 1931	2 June 1932	15 June 1938	6 October 1945	Scrapped 1946
Crusader	Ottawa	H60	HM Dockyard, Portsmouth	12 September 1930	30 September 1931	2 May 1932	15 June 1938	13 September 1942	Torpedoed by German submarine U-91, 13 September 1942
Cygnet	St. Laurent	H83	Vickers Armstrongs, Barrow	1 December 1930	29 September 1931	15 April 1932	17 February 1937	10 October 1945	Scrapped 1947
Crescent	Fraser	H48	Vickers Armstrongs, Barrow	1 December 1930	29 September 1931	1 April 1934	17 February 1937	25 June 1940	Sunk in collision with HMS Calcutta in Gironde estuary, 25 June 1940
D class
Decoy	Kootenay	H75	Thornycroft, Woolston	25 June 1931	7 June 1932	17 January 1933	12 April 1943	25 October 1945	Sold for scrapping 1946
Diana	Margaree	H49	Palmers, Jarrow	12 June 1931	16 June 1932	21 December 1932	6 September 1940	22 October 1940	Sunk in collision with MV Port Fairy, 22 October 1940
E class
Express	Gatineau	H61	Swan Hunter & Wigham Richardson, Wallsend	24 March 1933	29 May 1934	2 November 1934	3 June 1943	10 January 1946	Scuttled as breakwater at Royston, British Columbia in 1948.
F class
Foxhound	Qu'Appelle	H69	John Brown, Clydebank	21 August 1933	12 October 1934	6 June 1935	8 February 1944	27 May 1946	Sold 1947 for scrapping at Sydney, Nova Scotia.
Fortune	Saskatchewan	H70	John Brown, Clydebank	25 July 1933	29 August 1934	27 April 1935	31 May 1943	28 January 1946	Broken up 1946 at Sydney.
G class
Griffin	Ottawa	H31	Vickers Armstrongs, Barrow-in-Furness	20 September 1934	15 August 1935	6 March 1936	20 March 1943	31 October 1945	Broken up 1946.
H class
Hero	Chaudière	H99	Vickers Armstrongs, Walker	28 February 1935	10 March 1936	21 October 1936	15 November 1943	17 August 1945	Broken up 1950 at Sydney.

== Sources ==
- Butterley, Keith, and Macpherson, Ken. River class destroyers of the Royal Canadian Navy. 2nd ed. St. Catharines, Ont. : Vanwell Pub., c2008. ISBN 978-1-55125-093-9
- English, John (1993). Amazon to Ivanhoe: British Standard Destroyers of the 1930s. Kendal, England: World Ship Society. ISBN 0-905617-64-9.
- Lenton, H. T. (1998). British & Empire Warships of the Second World War. Annapolis, Maryland: Naval Institute Press. ISBN 1-55750-048-7.
- Macpherson, Kenneth R. and Barrie, Ron. (2002)(Third Edition) The Ships of Canada's Naval Forces 1910–2002. Vanwell Publishing. ISBN 1-55125-072-1
- Whitley, M. J. (1988). Destroyers of World War 2. Annapolis, Maryland: Naval Institute Press. ISBN 0-87021-326-1.
