= List of ship launches in 1932 =

The list of ship launches in 1932 includes a chronological list of some ships launched in 1932.

Date	Ship	Class / type	Builder	Location	Country	Notes
January	I.W.C. 668	Barge	Alabama Drydock and Shipbuilding Company	Mobile, Alabama	United States	For Inland Waterways Commission.
February	I.W.C. 669	Barge	Alabama Drydock and Shipbuilding Company	Mobile, Alabama	United States	For Inland Waterways Commission.
15 March	Floating Crane No.2	Floating crane	Harland & Wolff	Belfast	United Kingdom	For Cowans, Sheldon & Co.
22 March	Royal Iris II	Ferry	Harland & Wolff	Belfast	United Kingdom	For Wallasey Corporation.
March	I.W.C. 670	Barge	Alabama Drydock and Shipbuilding Company	Mobile, Alabama	United States	For Inland Waterways Commission.
7 April	Daring	D-class destroyer	John I. Thornycroft & Company	Woolston, Hampshire	United Kingdom	
7 April	Defender	D-class destroyer	Vickers-Armstrongs	Barrow-in-Furness	United Kingdom	
8 April	Diamond	D-class destroyer	Vickers-Armstrongs	Barrow-in-Furness	United Kingdom	
19 April	Falmouth	Shoreham-class sloop	Devonport Dockyard	Plymouth	United Kingdom	
3 May	Dainty	D-class destroyer	Fairfield Shipbuilding and Engineering Company	Govan, Glasgow	United Kingdom	
4 May	Baron Ardrossan	Cargo ship	Harland & Wolff	Belfast	United Kingdom	For H. Hogarth & Sons.
5 May	Duchess of Hamilton	Passenger ship	Harland & Wolff	Govan	United Kingdom	For Caledonian Steam Packet Co.
21 May	Portland	Portland-class cruiser	Fore River Shipyard	Quincy, Massachusetts	United States	
2 June	Delight	D-class destroyer	Fairfield Shipbuilding and Engineering Company	Govan, Glasgow	United Kingdom	
4 June	Moldanger	Reefer ship	Nederlandsche Scheepsbouw Maatschappij	Amsterdam	Netherlands	For Westfal-Larsen (Norway)
7 June	Decoy	D-class destroyer	John I. Thornycroft & Company	Woolston, Hampshire	United Kingdom	
16 June	Diana	D-class destroyer	Palmers Shipbuilding and Iron Company	Jarrow	United Kingdom	
20 June	Prins Hendrik	Ferry	NV Koninklijke Maatschappij De Schelde	Vlissingen	Netherlands	For Provinciale Stoombootdiensten in Zeeland
5 July	Bhadravati	Ferry	Harland & Wolff	Belfast	United Kingdom	For Bombay Steam Navigation Co.
7 July	Duncan	D-class destroyer	HM Dockyard	Portsmouth	United Kingdom	
10 July	Armando Diaz	Condottieri-class cruiser	OTO	La Spezia	Italy	
18 July	Lurline	Ocean liner	Bethlehem Shipbuilding Corporation, Fore River Shipyard		United States	For Matson Lines
19 July	Duchess	D-class destroyer	Palmers Shipbuilding and Iron Company	Jarrow	United Kingdom	For Royal Navy
14 October	Le Centaure	Redoutable-class submarine	Arsenal de Brest	Brest	France	For French Navy
29 October	Normandie	Ocean liner	Penhoët	Saint-Nazaire	France	For Compagnie Générale Transatlantique.
2 December	North Carr Lightship	Lightship	Harland & Wolff	Govan	United Kingdom	For Trinity House
19 December	Danmark	Full-rigged ship	Nakskov	Lolland	Denmark	For Danish Maritime Authority.
21 December	Olav Tryggvason	Minelayer	Naval Dockyard	Horten	Norway	
Unknown date	Barge No. 1	Tank barge	Alabama Drydock and Shipbuilding Company	Mobile, Alabama	United States	For Three Rivers Oil Corp.
Unknown date	M.T.C. No. 101	Tank barge	Alabama Drydock and Shipbuilding Company	Mobile, Alabama	United States	For Texas Company.
Unknown date	M.T.C. No. 102	Tank barge	Alabama Drydock and Shipbuilding Company	Mobile, Alabama	United States	For Sun Oil Co..
Unknown date	No. 96	Tank barge	Alabama Drydock and Shipbuilding Company	Mobile, Alabama	United States	For Standard Dredging Corp.
Unknown date	Unnamed	Barge	Alabama Drydock and Shipbuilding Company	Mobile, Alabama	United States	For private owner.
Unknown date	Unnamed	Tank barge	Alabama Drydock and Shipbuilding Company	Mobile, Alabama	United States	For Pure Oil Company.
