= HMCS Margaree =

Several Canadian naval units have been named HMCS Margaree.

- HMCS Margaree (H49) (I) was an Interwar standard D-class destroyer serving first in the Royal Navy as HMS Diana (H49) and then for one month with the Royal Canadian Navy as a River-class destroyer from September–October 1940 when she was lost in a collision with a freighter.
- HMCS Margaree (DDH 230) (II) served from 1957–1992 as a Cold War era St. Laurent-class destroyer.

== Battle honours ==
Atlantic 1940
