= C and D-class destroyer =

Ship class

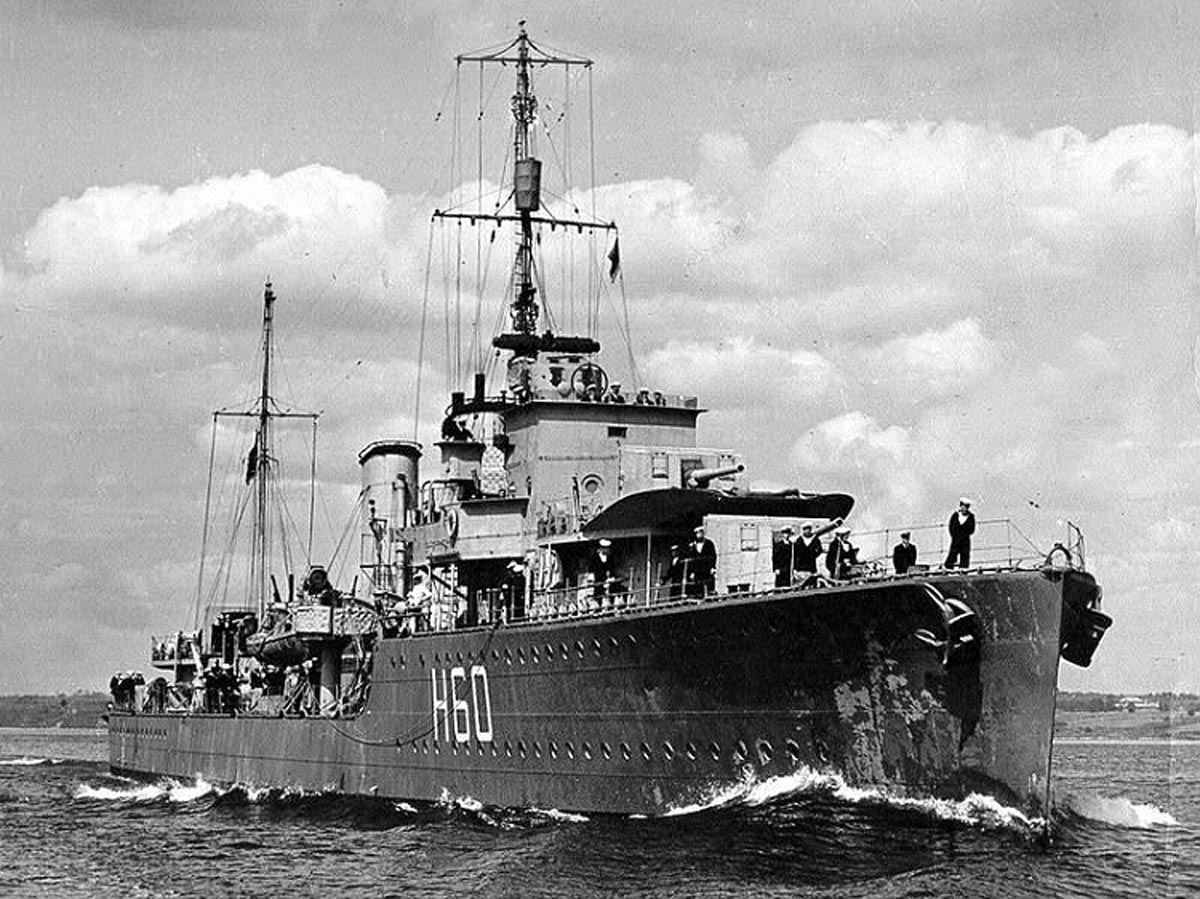
- HMCS Ottawa

Class overview
- Name: C and D
- Operators: Royal Navy; Royal Canadian Navy
- Preceded by: A- and B class
- Succeeded by: E and F class
- Subclasses: C, D
- Built: 1930–1933
- In commission: 1932–1945
- Planned: 14
- Completed: 14
- Lost: 10

General characteristics (HMS Dainty as built)
- Type: Destroyer
- Displacement: 1,375 long tons (1,397 t) (standard); 1,890 long tons (1,920 t) (deep load)
- Length: 329 ft (100.3 m) (o/a)
- Beam: 33 ft (10.1 m)
- Draught: 12 ft 6 in (3.8 m)
- Installed power: 3 × Admiralty 3-drum boilers; 36,000 shp (27,000 kW)
- Propulsion: 2 × shafts; 2 × geared steam turbines
- Speed: 36 knots (67 km/h; 41 mph)
- Range: 5,870 nmi (10,870 km; 6,760 mi) at 15 knots (28 km/h; 17 mph)
- Complement: 145
- Sensors & processing systems: ASDIC
- Armament: 4 × single QF 4.7-inch Mk IX guns; 1 × single QF 3-inch AA gun; 2 × quadruple QF .5-inch Vickers Mk III anti-aircraft machineguns; 2 × quadruple 21-inch torpedo tubes; 1 × depth charge rail and 2 throwers for 20 depth charges

The C and D class was a group of 14 destroyers built for the Royal Navy in the early 1930s. As in previous years, it was originally intended to order a complete flotilla comprising eight destroyers—plus a flotilla leader as the ninth unit—in each year. However, only four ships—plus a leader—were ordered under the 1929–1930 Programme as the C class. The other four ships planned for the C class were never ordered as an economy measure and disarmament gesture by the Labour government of Ramsay MacDonald. A complete flotilla—the 'D' class—was ordered under the 1930–1931 Programme.

The five ships of the C class were assigned to Home Fleet upon their completion, although they reinforced the Mediterranean Fleet during the Italian invasion of Abyssinia of 1935–1936 and enforced the Non-Intervention Agreement during the Spanish Civil War of 1936–1939. They were transferred to the Royal Canadian Navy (RCN) in 1937–1939 and spent most of their time during World War II on convoy escort duties in the Atlantic Ocean. Fraser (formerly Crescent) was sunk when she was accidentally rammed by the British cruiser HMS Calcutta in 1940. Ottawa (formerly Crusader) was sunk by a German submarine in 1942, though she had sunk an Italian submarine in 1940. The other ships of the class sank three German submarines during the war. They were all worn out by the end of the war and were scrapped in 1946–1947.

The D-class destroyers were initially assigned to the Mediterranean Fleet upon commissioning, but were transferred to the China Station in 1935. Like the C class, most were temporarily deployed in the Red Sea when the Italians invaded Abyssinia, but returned to the China Station when that was over. They were still there when the war began, but reinforced the Mediterranean Fleet shortly afterwards. Five ships were transferred to Home Fleet in December 1939, but Duchess was sunk en route when she was accidentally rammed by the battleship HMS Barham, and Duncan was badly damaged when she collided with a merchant ship, requiring lengthy repairs. Daring was sunk by a German submarine in February 1940. The other two participated in the Norwegian Campaign of April–June, but Delight was sunk by German aircraft in July and Diana was transferred to the RCN as a replacement for the Crescent after she was sunk by the cruiser Calcutta. However, she too was rammed and sunk several months later by a freighter that she was escorting.

The four ships that remained with the Mediterranean Fleet sank three Italian submarines in 1940 while escorting Malta convoys and larger warships of the fleet. Several participated in the Battles of Calabria and Cape Spartivento that year. Duncan joined Force H at Gibraltar in October and escorted that group. Dainty was sunk by German bombers in February 1941 and Diamond in April while evacuating Allied personnel from Greece. Defender had to be scuttled in July when she was crippled by a German bomber when returning from escorting a convoy to Tobruk. Duncan and Decoy remained on escort duties for the rest of the year before being transferred to the Eastern Fleet in early 1942. They returned to the UK late in the year to begin conversions to escort destroyers. Decoy was transferred to the RCN in early 1943, but both became convoy escorts in the Atlantic. They sank two German submarines before being assigned to the UK to protect Allied shipping during Operation Overlord. They sank three more submarines before the end of the war and were paid off in 1945. Duncan was scrapped in 1945 and Decoy during 1946.

== Design and description ==
These ships were based on the preceding B class, but were enlarged to increase their endurance and to allow for the inclusion of a QF 3-inch 20 cwt anti-aircraft gun. This class introduced a director-control tower for British destroyers. The 'C' class were unique in having a split bridge, with the compass platform and wheelhouse separated from the chartroom and director tower. This unusual layout was not repeated. As per Admiralty policy in alternating Two-Speed Destroyer Sweep (TSDS) minesweeping gear and ASDIC (sonar) capability between destroyer flotillas, the C class lacked ASDIC and were designed to carry only six depth charges. The D class were repeats of the C's, except that the TSDS was replaced by storage for up to 30 depth charges and ASDIC.

The C- and D-class destroyers displaced 1,375 long tons (1,397 t) at standard load and 1,865 long tons (1,895 t) at deep load. The ships had an overall length of 329 feet (100.3 m), a beam of 33 feet (10.1 m) and a draught of 12 feet 6 inches (3.8 m). They were powered by Parsons geared steam turbines, driving two shafts, which developed a total of 36,000 shaft horsepower (27,000 kW) and gave a maximum speed of 36 knots (67 km/h; 41 mph). Steam for the turbines was provided by three Admiralty 3-drum water-tube boilers that operated at a pressure of 300 psi (2,068 kPa; 21 kgf/cm^{2}) and a temperature of 600 °F (316 °C). The destroyers carried a maximum of 473 long tons (481 t) of fuel oil that gave them a range of 5,500 nautical miles (10,200 km; 6,300 mi) at 15 knots (28 km/h; 17 mph). Their complement was 145 officers and ratings.

Kempenfelt, leader of the C class, displaced 15 long tons (15 t) more than her destroyers and carried an extra 30 personnel who formed the staff of the Captain (D), commanding officer of the flotilla. Unique among the C and D-class ships, she had three Yarrow water-tube boilers that operated at a pressure of 310 psi (2,137 kPa; 22 kgf/cm^{2}). Duncan, leader of the 'D' class, displaced 25 long tons (25 t) more than her destroyers and also carried an extra 30 personnel.

All of the ships of the class mounted four 45-calibre 4.7-inch Mk IX guns in single mounts, designated 'A', 'B', 'X', and 'Y' from front to rear. For anti-aircraft (AA) defence, they had a single QF 3-inch 20 cwt (Note: "cwt" is the abbreviation for hundredweight, 30 cwt referring to the weight of the gun.) AA gun between her funnels. The C-class ships carried two 40-millimetre (1.6 in) QF 2-pounder Mk II AA guns mounted on the aft end of their forecastle deck. The D-class destroyers had been intended to carry the new QF 0.5-inch (12.7 mm) Mk III machine gun in quadruple mountings on the bridge wings, but these were not initially available, so the old 2-pounder guns were retained in Daring, Diana, Diamond and Defender. The 3-inch AA gun was removed in 1936–37, and the 2-pounders were relocated between the funnels on platforms The ships were fitted with two above-water quadruple mount for 21-inch (533 mm) torpedoes.

The main guns were controlled by an Admiralty Fire Control Clock Mk I that used data derived from the director and the rangefinder. They had no capability for anti-aircraft fire and the anti-aircraft guns were aimed solely by eye.

When purchased by Canada in 1937–38, the four C-class destroyers were refitted to meet Canadian specifications, including the installation of Type 124 ASDIC. It is not clear how much Kempenfelt had been modified when she was turned over in October 1939, other than steam heating had yet been fitted.

=== Wartime modifications ===
Beginning in May 1940, the after bank of torpedo tubes was removed and replaced with a QF 12-pounder Mk V anti-aircraft gun, the after mast and funnel being cut down to improve the gun's field of fire. Four to six QF 20 mm Oerlikon cannons were added to the surviving ships, usually replacing the 2-pounder or .50-calibre machine gun mounts between the funnels. One pair of these was added to the bridge wings and the other pair was mounted on the searchlight platform. Early in the war, depth charge stowage increased to 33 in the C class, while the D class carried 38. 'Y' gun on the quarterdeck was removed on many ships to allow for additional depth charge stowage as was the 12-pounder. On at least one ship, this latter gun replaced 'X' gun. Most ships had either 'A' or 'B' gun replaced by a Hedgehog anti-submarine spigot mortar, although Duncan retained both and received a split Hedgehog that was mounted on either side of 'A' gun. Some ships that received the Hedgehog in 'B' position also mounted two old QF 6-pounder Hotchkiss guns for use against U-boats at very close range.

Most ships had their director-control tower and rangefinder above the bridge removed in exchange for a Type 271 target-indication radar. A Type 286 short-range surface search radar, adapted from the Royal Air Force's ASV radar, was also added. The early models, however, could only scan directly forward and had to be aimed by turning the entire ship. Some ships also received a Huff-Duff radio direction finder on a short mainmast.

== Ships ==
C class construction data
Name	Builder	Laid down	Launched	Completed	Fate
Kempenfelt	J. Samuel White, Cowes	18 October 1930	29 October 1931	30 May 1932	To Canada as HMCS Assiniboine 1939, wrecked on Prince Edward Island, 10 November 1945; scrapped 1952
Comet	HM Dockyard, Portsmouth	12 September 1930	30 September 1931	2 June 1932	To Canada as HMCS Restigouche 1938, scrapped 1946
Crusader	HM Dockyard, Portsmouth	12 September 1930	30 September 1931	2 May 1932	To Canada as HMCS Ottawa 1938, torpedoed by the German submarine U-91, 13 September 1942
Cygnet	Vickers Armstrongs, Barrow	1 December 1930	29 September 1931	15 April 1932	To Canada as HMCS St. Laurent 1937; scrapped 1947
Crescent	Vickers Armstrongs, Barrow	1 December 1930	29 September 1931	1 April 1934	To Canada as HMCS Fraser 1937, sunk in collision with HMS Calcutta, 25 June 1940

D class construction data
Name	Builder	Laid down	Launched	Completed	Fate
Duncan	HM Dockyard, Portsmouth	25 September 1931	7 July 1932	31 March 1933	Scrapped, 1945
Dainty	Fairfield, Govan	20 April 1931	3 May 1932	22 December 1932	Bombed and sunk, 24 February 1941
Daring	Thornycroft, Woolston	18 June 1931	7 April 1932	25 November 1932	Sunk by the German submarine U-23, 18 February 1940
Decoy	Thornycroft, Woolston	25 June 1931	7 June 1932	17 January 1933	To Canada as HMCS Kootenay 1943; sold for scrap, 1946
Defender	Vickers Armstrongs, Barrow	22 June 1931	7 April 1932	31 October 1932	Bombed and sunk, 11 July 1941
Delight	Fairfield, Govan	22 April 1931	2 June 1932	31 January 1933	Bombed and sunk, 29 July 1940
Diamond	Vickers Armstrongs, Barrow	29 September 1931	8 April 1932	3 November 1932	Bombed and sunk, 27 April 1941
Diana	Palmers, Jarrow	12 June 1931	16 June 1932	21 December 1932	To Canada as HMCS Margaree 1940, sunk in collision with MV Port Fairy, 22 October 1940
Duchess	Palmers, Jarrow	12 June 1931	19 July 1932	27 January 1933	Sunk in collision with HMS Barham, 12 December 1939

== Service ==
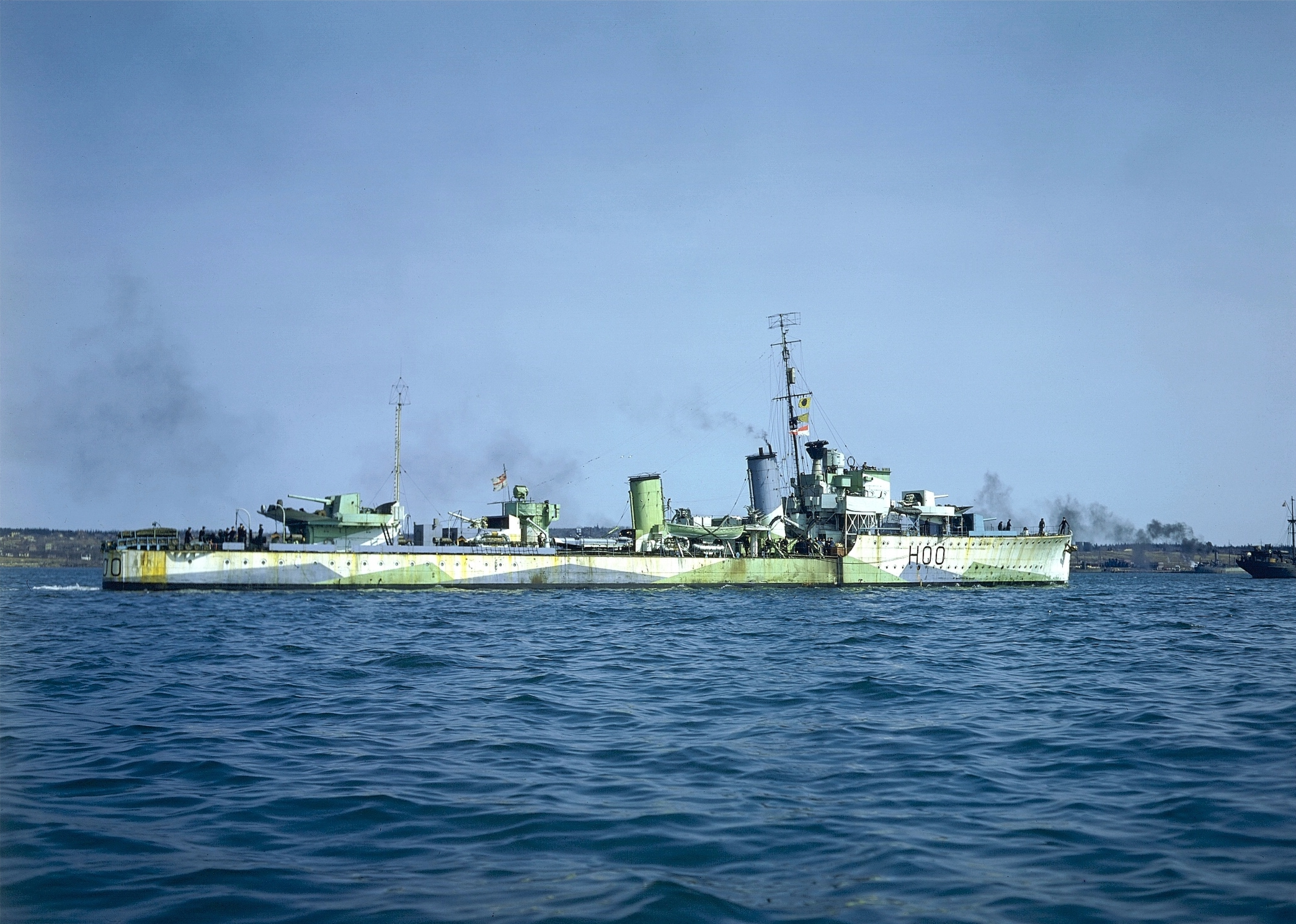
HMCS Restigouche about 1942–43

All five of the C class were assigned to the 2nd Destroyer Flotilla of the Home Fleet upon commissioning during 1932. Following the Italian invasion of Abyssinia, the entire flotilla was sent to the Red Sea in August 1935 to monitor Italian warship movements until April 1936. Refitted upon their return, they were deployed to Spanish waters during the Spanish Civil War in 1936–37 to intercept shipping carrying contraband goods to Spain and to protect British-flagged ships. Crescent and Cygnet were sold to the Royal Canadian Navy in 1937 and Comet and Crusader in 1938. Kempenfelt was bought in 1939, but the Royal Navy did not turn her over until enough auxiliary anti-submarine ships had been commissioned to replace her after World War II had started. All four 'C'-class ships were stationed at Esquimalt in British Columbia when the war began, but only Fraser and St. Laurent were immediately recalled to begin convoy escort duties on the Atlantic Coast, the other two following in November. Assiniboine was sent to the Caribbean for local escort duties in December where she assisted in the capture of the blockade runner MV Hannover in March 1940. Fraser, St. Laurent, and Restigouche were transferred to the UK in late May and helped to evacuate refugees from France. Fraser was sunk on 25 June 1940 in a collision with the anti-aircraft cruiser HMS Calcutta in the Gironde estuary while the other two were assigned to the Western Approaches Command for escort duties.

The remaining ships spent most of the rest of the war escorting convoys in the North Atlantic, based in either Canada or the UK. Ottawa assisted the British destroyer Harvester in sinking the Italian submarine Comandante Faà di Bruno on 7 November 1940. She was sunk by the German submarine U-91 on 14 September 1942 while escorting Convoy ON 127. St. Laurent had her first victory on 27 December 1942 when she was credited with sinking U-356 while defending Convoy ON 154. Together with the destroyer HMS Forester, and the frigates HMCS Owen Sound and HMCS Swansea, she sank U-845. While escorting Convoy SC 94 on 3 August 1942, Assiniboine rammed and sank U-210. Restigouche never sank a submarine, but she and St. Laurent were transferred to the UK to protect the shipping mustering for Operation Overlord in May 1944 and Assiniboine followed in July. They saw some action against German patrol boats in the Bay of Biscay, but Restigouche and St. Laurent were in poor shape by this time and were sent back to Canada for lengthy refits in late 1944. They remained in Canada after the completion of their refits in early 1945, while Assiniboine remained in the UK until June. All three ships transported Canadian troops home after VE Day until they were decommissioned in late 1945. All three were broken up in 1946–47.

Upon commissioning in 1932–33, the D class formed the 1st Destroyer Flotilla assigned to the Mediterranean Fleet. The flotilla toured the Persian Gulf and the Red Sea in September–November 1933. After refitting in the UK during 1934, the flotilla was transferred to the China Station, arriving at Hong Kong in January 1935 and renumbered as the 8th Destroyer Flotilla. Most of the flotilla was sent to the Red Sea during the Italian invasion of Abyssinia in 1935–36. They returned to the Hong Kong in mid-1936 and remained there until World War II began. Diamond was in the midst of a refit that lasted until November, but the rest of the flotilla was immediately transferred to the Mediterranean Fleet. Daring was kept in the Red Sea for escort duties until November, but the rest of the flotilla was used on contraband patrol duties upon arrival. They all needed repairs which were made before the end of the year.

Duncan, Diana, Duchess, Delight and Daring were transferred to the Home Fleet in December 1939, although Duchess was rammed and sunk on 10 December by the battleship Barham that she was escorting. Duncan was so badly damaged in a collision with a merchant ship in January 1940 that her repairs required six months to complete. Daring was sunk by the German submarine U-23 on 18 February while escorting a convoy from Norway. Diana and Delight were assigned to convoy escort duties in early 1940, before participating in the Norwegian Campaign in April–June. While attempting to sail through the English Channel in daylight, contrary to orders, Delight was sunk by German aircraft on 29 July. After a brief refit in July–August, Diana was transferred to the RCN to replace HMCS Fraser which had been sunk in a collision by a Royal Navy cruiser. Recommissioned on 6 September and renamed HMCS Margaree, the ship was assigned to convoy escort duties in the North Atlantic. On 22 October, she was sunk in a collision with the freighter MV Port Fairy.

The remaining four ships of the flotilla were briefly assigned to Freetown, West Africa in early 1940 to escort convoys passing through the area and to search for German commerce raiders. They were all recalled to the Mediterranean in April–May in anticipation of Italian entry into the war. Decoy, Defender, and Dainty sank two Italian submarines, Dainty sinking one more with the destroyer Ilex in June, before they participated in the Battle of Calabria early the following month. Diamond joined her sisters in late July and all four ships escorted convoys and the ships of the Mediterranean Fleet for the rest of the year. Duncan joined Force H at Gibraltar in October and participated in the inconclusive Battle of Cape Spartivento together with Diamond and Defender in November. Decoy had been damaged by aircraft earlier that month and was under repair until February 1941.

While patrolling the North African coast on 24 February with the destroyer Hasty, Dainty was sunk by German bombers. Duncan, Diamond and Defender continued to provide escorts as needed in early 1941, although Duncan was transferred to Freetown in March. Decoy, Defender and Diamond evacuated Allied troops from Greece and Crete in April–May, although Diamond was sunk by German aircraft on 27 April while doing so. After Defender participated in the invasion of Vichy French-controlled Syria and Lebanon in June, she joined Decoy in escorting convoys to Tobruk and was badly damaged when returning from one of these missions. The ship was attacked by a single German Junkers Ju 88 bomber on 11 July and had to be scuttled by her consort, the Australian destroyer Vendetta. Duncan rejoined Force H that same month and she escorted several major convoys to Malta before returning to the UK in October for a lengthy refit. Decoy was damaged in a collision in December and was repaired at Malta until February 1942.

Decoy was transferred to the Eastern Fleet in March and was escorting Force B when the Japanese carriers attacked Ceylon. The Japanese never spotted Force B, and the ship remained with the fleet until ordered home in September to convert to an escort destroyer. After Duncan's refit was completed in January 1942, she rejoined Force H and escorted several missions to fly off Royal Air Force fighters from aircraft carriers to Malta before she was transferred to the Eastern Fleet in April to support Operation Ironclad, the invasion of Diego Suarez, in early May. She, too, was recalled to the UK to be modified as an escort destroyer.

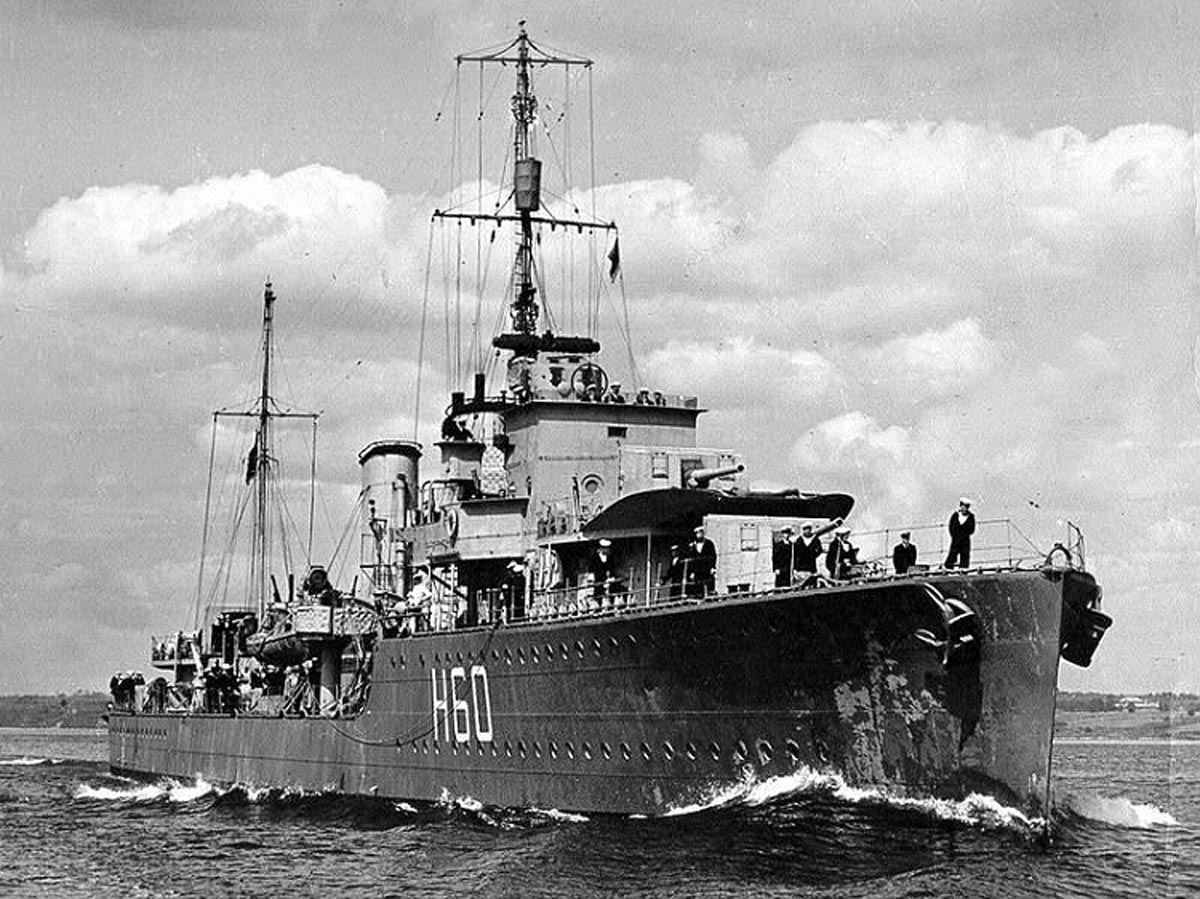
HMCS Ottawa about 1942–43

Decoy was transferred to the Royal Canadian Navy on 1 March 1943 during her conversion and was recommissioned on 12 April with the new name of HMCS Kootenay (the ship was gifted to the Canadians on 15 June). After working up, she was assigned to Escort Group C5 for convoy escort duties in the North Atlantic. In April, Duncan joined Escort Group B-7. While defending Convoy ON-207 on 23 October, Duncan, together with the destroyer Vidette and a Consolidated B-24 Liberator of No. 224 Squadron RAF, sank U-274. Later the same month, on 29 October, Duncan shared the sinking of U-282 with Vidette and the corvette Sunflower while protecting Convoy ON-208. Both ships remained on escort duty until May 1944 when they were transferred to the UK in preparation for Operation Overlord. Duncan was assigned to the Western Approaches Command, conducting anti-submarine operations, for the rest of the war. Kootenay was tasked to protect Allied shipping in the English Channel and the Bay of Biscay and, together with other ships, she sank U-678 in the English Channel on 7 July 1944, U-621 in the Bay of Biscay on 18 August, and, two days later, U-984 west of Brest.

After a lengthy refit in Canada from October 1944 to February 1945, Kootenay returned to the UK and was assigned to the Western Approaches Command until the end of the war. She then transported returning troops in Canada until paid off in October. She was sold for scrap in 1946. Duncan was paid off in May and sold in July although she was not completely broken up until 1949.

== See also ==
- List of ship classes of World War II
