= HMS Comet (H00) =

British C-class destroyer

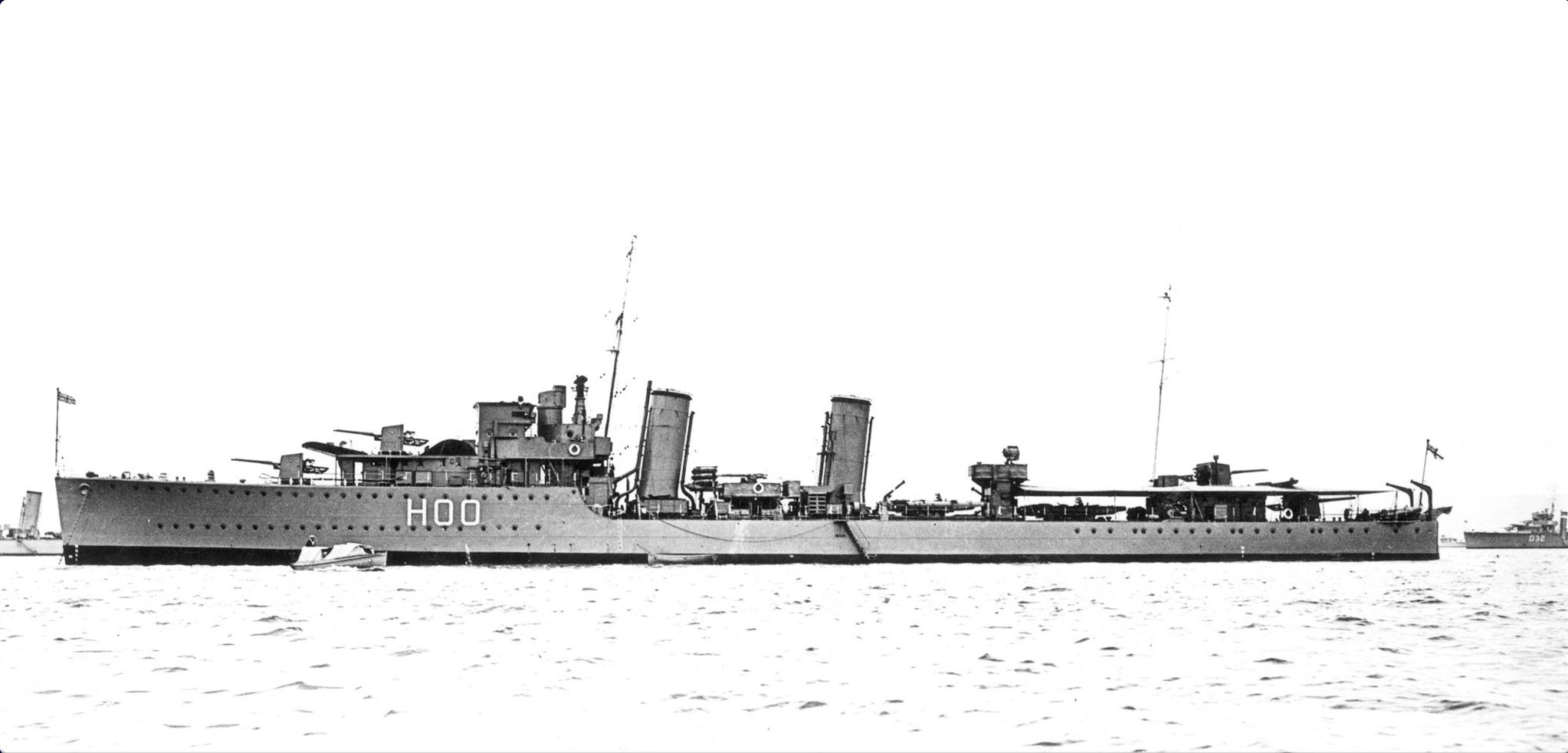
- Restigouche in original configuration with four 4.7-inch guns, tall second funnel and AA gun between the funnels

History

United Kingdom
- Name: Comet
- Ordered: 15 July 1930
- Builder: Portsmouth Dockyard
- Laid down: 12 September 1930
- Launched: 30 September 1931
- Completed: 2 June 1932
- Identification: Pennant number: H00
- Motto: Follow the Light
- Fate: Transferred to the Royal Canadian Navy and renamed Restigouche, 11 June 1938
- Badge: On a Field Black, a Comet Silver

Canada
- Name: Restigouche
- Namesake: Restigouche River
- Commissioned: 11 June 1938
- Decommissioned: 6 October 1945
- Identification: Pennant number: H00
- Honours and awards: Atlantic 1939–45, North Sea 1940, Mediterranean 1943, Normandy 1944, Biscay 1944
- Fate: Scrapped, 1946

General characteristics as built
- Class & type: C-class destroyer
- Displacement: 1,375 long tons (1,397 t) (standard); 1,865 long tons (1,895 t) (deep)
- Length: 329 ft (100.3 m) o/a
- Beam: 33 ft (10.1 m)
- Draught: 12 ft 6 in (3.8 m)
- Installed power: 36,000 shp (27,000 kW)
- Propulsion: 2 × shafts; 2 × Parsons geared steam turbines; 3 × Admiralty 3-drum boilers
- Speed: 36 knots (67 km/h; 41 mph)
- Range: 5,500 nmi (10,200 km; 6,300 mi) at 15 knots (28 km/h; 17 mph)
- Complement: 145
- Armament: 4 × 1 – QF 4.7-inch Mk IX guns; 1 × 1 – QF 3-inch 20 cwt anti-aircraft gun; 2 × 1 – QF 2-pounder Mk II AA guns; 2 × 4 – 21 inch (533 mm) torpedo tubes; 6 × depth charges, 3 chutes

HMS Comet was a C-class destroyer built for the Royal Navy in the early 1930s. She saw service in the Home and Mediterranean Fleets and the ship spent six months during the Spanish Civil War in late 1936 in Spanish waters, enforcing the arms blockade imposed by Britain and France on both sides of the conflict. Comet transferred to the Royal Canadian Navy (RCN) in 1938 and renamed HMCS Restigouche. During World War II, she served as a convoy escort in the battle of the Atlantic, on anti-submarine patrols during the invasion of Normandy, and was employed as a troop transport after VE Day for returning Canadian servicemen, before being decommissioned in late 1945. Restigouche was sold for scrap in 1946.

== Design and construction ==
Comet displaced 1,375 long tons (1,397 t) at standard load and 1,865 long tons (1,895 t) at deep load. The ship had an overall length of 329 feet (100.3 m), a beam of 33 feet (10.1 m) and a draught of 12 feet 6 inches (3.8 m). She was powered by Parsons geared steam turbines, driving two shafts, which developed a total of 36,000 shaft horsepower (27,000 kW) and gave a maximum speed of 36 knots (67 km/h; 41 mph). Steam for the turbines was provided by three Admiralty 3-drum water-tube boilers. Comet carried a maximum of 473 long tons (481 t) of fuel oil that gave her a range of 5,500 nautical miles (10,200 km; 6,300 mi) at 15 knots (28 km/h; 17 mph). The ship's complement was 145 officers and men.

The ship mounted four 45-calibre 4.7-inch Mk IX guns in single mounts, designated 'A', 'B', 'X', and 'Y' from front to rear. For anti-aircraft (AA) defence, Comet had a single QF 3-inch 20 cwt (Note: "cwt" is the abbreviation for hundredweight, 30 cwt referring to the weight of the gun.) AA gun between her funnels, and two 40-millimetre (1.6 in) QF 2-pounder Mk II AA guns mounted on the aft end of her forecastle deck. The 3-inch (76 mm) AA gun was removed in 1936 and the 2-pounders were relocated to between the funnels. She was fitted with two above-water quadruple torpedo tube mounts for 21-inch torpedoes. Three depth-charge chutes were fitted, each with a capacity of two depth charges. After World War II began this was increased to 33 depth charges, delivered by one or two rails and two throwers.

The ship was ordered on 15 July 1930 from Portsmouth Dockyard under the 1929 Programme. Comet was laid down on 12 September 1930, launched on 30 September 1931, as the fourteenth ship to carry the name, and completed on 2 June 1932.

== Service history ==
After sea trials in May 1932, Comet was commissioned for service in the 2nd Destroyer Flotilla, Home Fleet, in early June. On 21 July, she was damaged in a collision with her sister Crescent at Chatham and repaired at Chatham Dockyard between 28 July and 20 August. The ship was refitted at Chatham from 20 July to 3 September 1934. Following the Italian invasion of Abyssinia, Comet was sent in August 1935 to the Red Sea with the other ships of the 2nd Flotilla to monitor Italian warship movements until March 1936.

Comet returned to the UK in April 1936 and refitted at Sheerness between 23 April and 29 June before resuming duty with the Home Fleet. In July she was deployed for patrol duties off the Spanish coast in the Bay of Biscay to intercept shipping carrying contraband goods to Spain and to protect British flagged shipping during the first stages of the Spanish Civil War. On 9 August she assisted the crew of the crippled British yacht Blue Shadow off Gijón, after the small vessel was shelled by mistake by the Nationalist cruiser Almirante Cervera. The ship was briefly placed in reserve in late 1936 while discussions were held about transferring her to the Royal Canadian Navy. Two of her sisters were chosen instead and Comet was recommissioned for service with the Mediterranean Fleet as plane guard for the aircraft carrier Glorious on 29 December.

In April 1937 she returned to Portsmouth with Glorious, and on 20 May the ship participated in the Coronation Review of the fleet at Spithead by King George VI. Four days later, Comet began a refit at Portsmouth that lasted until 18 June. The ship resumed plane guard duties for Glorious in the Mediterranean. She began a major refit at Chatham on 26 May 1938 to bring her up to Canadian specifications that included the installation of Type 124 ASDIC.

=== Transfer to the Royal Canadian Navy ===
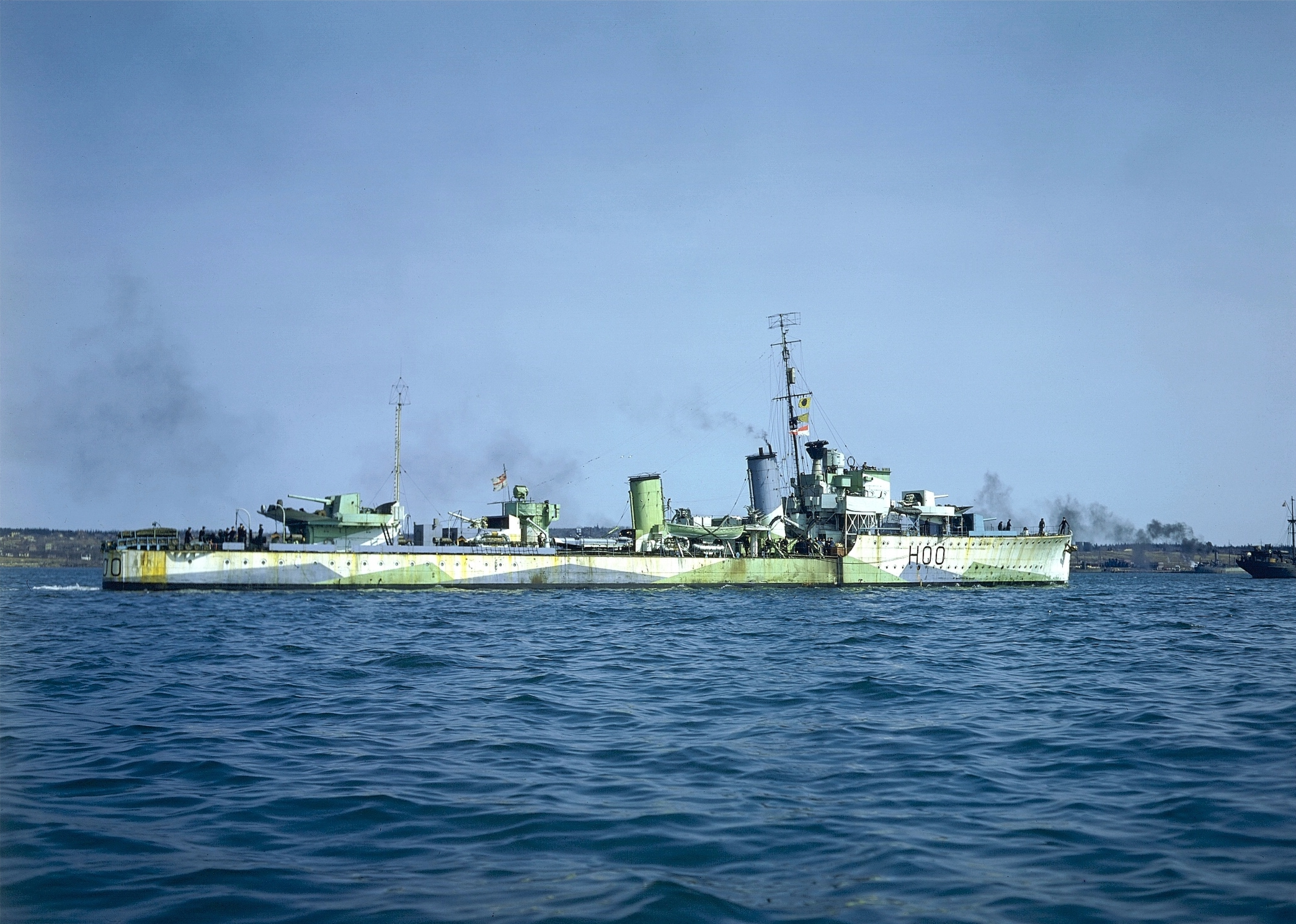
Restigouche showing her early war modifications, including shortened aft funnel, 12-pounder AA gun in lieu of the rear torpedo mount, and 'Y' gun replaced by additional depth charge storage.

On 11 June she was commissioned by the RCN and renamed Restigouche, although her refit was not completed until 20 August. Restigouche was assigned to the Canadian Pacific Coast and arrived at Esquimalt on 7 November 1938. She remained there until she was ordered to Halifax, Nova Scotia on 15 November 1939 where she escorted local convoys, including the convoy carrying half of the 1st Canadian Infantry Division to the UK on 10 December. Restigouche was ordered to Plymouth on 24 May 1940 and arrived there on 31 May. Upon arrival, the ship's rear torpedo tube mount was removed and replaced by a 12-pounder AA gun and the 2-pounders were exchanged for quadruple Mark I mounts for the QF 0.5-inch Vickers Mark III machine gun.

On 9 June, Restigouche was ordered to Le Havre, France to evacuate British troops, but none were to be found and the ship investigated the small port of Saint-Valery-en-Caux some 40 miles (64 km) northeast of Le Havre on 11 June. They found some elements of the 51st Infantry Division, but had not received any orders to evacuate and refused to do so. Whilst recovering her landing party, the ship was taken under fire by a German artillery battery, but she was not hit and returned fire. After returning to England, Restigouche escorted several troop convoys on the last legs of their journeys from Canada, Australia and New Zealand in mid-June. On 23 June, the ship escorted the ocean liner SS Arandora Star to St. Jean de Luz to evacuate Polish troops and British refugees trapped by the German Army in south-western France (Operation Aerial). On 25 June 1940, Restigouche, her sister HMCS Fraser, and the light cruiser HMS Calcutta were returning from St. Jean de Luz when Fraser was rammed by Calcutta in the Gironde estuary at night. Struck forward of the bridge by the cruiser's bow, Fraser was cut in half, although the rear part of the ship did not immediately sink. All but 47 of the ship's crew and evacuees were rescued by Restigouche and other nearby ships. The rear portion had to be sunk by Restigouche.

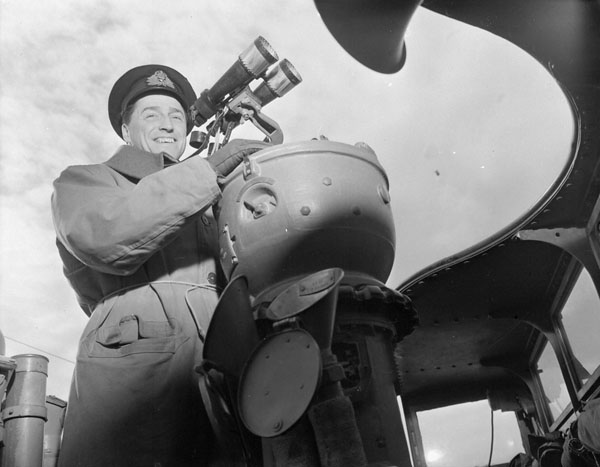
Lieutenant-Commander Desmond W. Piers, Commanding Officer, on the bridge of the destroyer HMCS Restigouche, which is escorting convoy SC 107 at sea, 21 April 1944

The ship was transferred to the Western Approaches Command afterwards for convoy escort duties. She sailed for Halifax at the end of August for a refit that lasted until October. Upon its completion, Restigouche remained at Halifax for local escort duties until January 1941 when she sailed for the UK where she was reassigned to the Western Approaches Command. The ship was ordered to St. John's, Newfoundland on 30 May to reinforce escort forces in the Western Atlantic. Whilst guarding the battleship Prince of Wales at Placentia Bay on 8 August, Restigouche damaged her propellers when she struck bottom and required repairs that lasted until October. She was not out of dockyard hands for very long before she was badly damaged by a storm while en route to join Convoy ON 44 on 12 December. Repairs at Greenock lasted until 9 March 1942 and her director-control tower and rangefinder above the bridge had been removed by this time in exchange for a Type 271 target indication radar.

Other changes made during the war (exactly when these occurred is unknown) included the replacement of 'A' gun by a Hedgehog anti-submarine spigot mortar, exchanging her two quadruple .50-calibre Vickers machine guns mounted between her funnels for two Oerlikon 20 mm AA guns, the addition of two Oerlikon guns to her searchlight platform, and the removal of her 12-pounder AA gun. Type 286 short-range surface search radar was also added. Two QF 6 pounder Hotchkiss guns were fitted on the wings of her bridge to deal with U-boats at short ranges. 'Y' gun was also removed to allow her depth charge stowage to be increased to at least 60 depth charges.

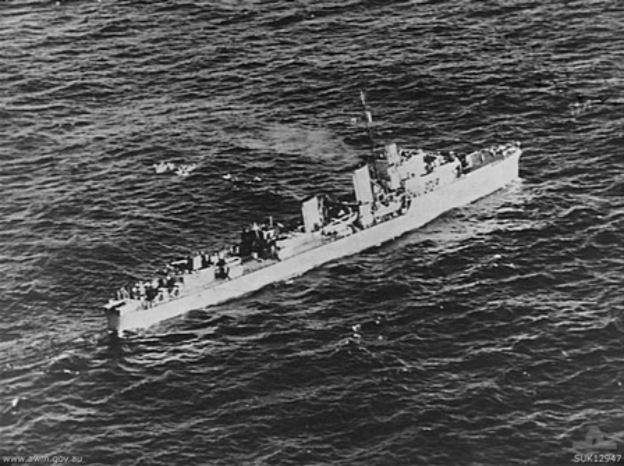
Restigouche picking up U-boat survivors, September 1944.

Restigouche was assigned to the Mid-Ocean Escort Force when her refit was finished and served with various escort groups. In April 1943 she was permanently assigned to Escort Group C4, and on 10 April she rescued 23 survivors from the Dutch cargo ship Blitar. Between August and December she was refitted, and thereafter she remained with C4 until she was transferred to 12th Escort Group in early 1944 for anti-submarine operations in the Western Approaches.

In June–July 1944, Restigouche patrolled in the English Channel and the Bay of Biscay hunting for German submarines trying to sink Allied shipping. On the night of 5–6 July, the ship and the rest of the 12th Escort Group sank three small German patrol boats off Brest. The following month, the 12th Support Group, including Restigouche, engaged three minesweepers on 12 August, without sinking any. The ship was sent to Canada for a lengthy refit later in the month. After working up in Bermuda, she arrived at Halifax on 14 February 1945 and began escorting local convoys. This lasted until the end of the war in May, after which the ship was used to transfer returning troops from Newfoundland to mainland Canada until she was paid off on 5 October. Restigouche was sold for scrap in 1946.

== Ship's bell ==
The Christening Bells Project at Canadian Forces Base Esquimalt Naval and Military Museum includes information about the baptism of babies in the ship's bell. The bell is currently held by the Royal Canadian Legion, Lantzville, British Columbia.

== Trans-Atlantic convoys escorted ==
| Convoy | Escort Group | Dates | From | To |
|---|---|---|---|---|
| SC 34 | | 15–18 June 1941 | Newfoundland | Iceland |
| SC 50 | | 25–31 Oct 1941 | Newfoundland | Iceland |
| ON 32 | | 6–13 Nov 1941 | Iceland | Newfoundland |
| SC 56 | | 24 Nov-12 Dec 1941 | Newfoundland | Iceland |
| ON 44 | | 12–14 Dec 1941 | Iceland | Newfoundland |
| ON 76 | | 16–28 March 1942 | Northern Ireland | Newfoundland |
| SC 78 | | 9–21 April 1942 | Newfoundland | Northern Ireland |
| ON 102 | MOEF group A3 | 12–21 June 1942 | Northern Ireland | Newfoundland |
| SC 101 | MOEF group C4 | 23 Sept-3 Oct 1942 | Newfoundland | Northern Ireland |
| ON 137 | MOEF group C4 | 12–22 Oct 1942 | Northern Ireland | Newfoundland |
| Convoy SC 107 | MOEF group C4 | 30 Oct-10 Nov 1942 | Newfoundland | Northern Ireland |
| ON 147 | MOEF group C4 | 18–28 Nov 1942 | Northern Ireland | Newfoundland |
| SC 112 | MOEF group C4 | 11–25 Dec 1942 | Newfoundland | Northern Ireland |
| ON 158 | MOEF group C4 | 5–17 Jan 1943 | Northern Ireland | Newfoundland |
| HX 224 | MOEF group C4 | 27 Jan-4 Feb 1943 | Newfoundland | Northern Ireland |
| KMF 10B | MOEF group C4 | 2–9 March 1943 | Firth of Clyde | Mediterranean Sea |
| MKF 10B | MOEF group C4 | 10–17 March 1943 | Mediterranean Sea | Firth of Clyde |
| ON 177 | MOEF group C4 | 7–17 April 1943 | Northern Ireland | Newfoundland |
| HX 235 | MOEF group C4 | 24 April-3 May 1943 | Newfoundland | Northern Ireland |
| ONS 8 | MOEF group C4 | 18–29 May 1943 | Northern Ireland | Newfoundland |
| SC 133 | MOEF group C4 | 8–19 June 1943 | Newfoundland | Northern Ireland |
| ONS 12 | | 4–15 July 1943 | Northern Ireland | Newfoundland |
| SC 137 | | 23 July-3 Aug 1943 | Newfoundland | Northern Ireland |
| ON 220 | | 16–28 Jan 1944 | Northern Ireland | Newfoundland |
| HX 279 | | 17–28 Feb 1944 | Newfoundland | Northern Ireland |
| ONS 30 | | 2–10 March 1944 | Northern Ireland | Newfoundland |
| HX 283 | | 19–28 March 1944 | Newfoundland | Northern Ireland |
