= HMS Crusader (H60) =

C-class destroyer built for the Royal Navy in the 1930s

Coordinates: 47.9167°N 43.4500°W

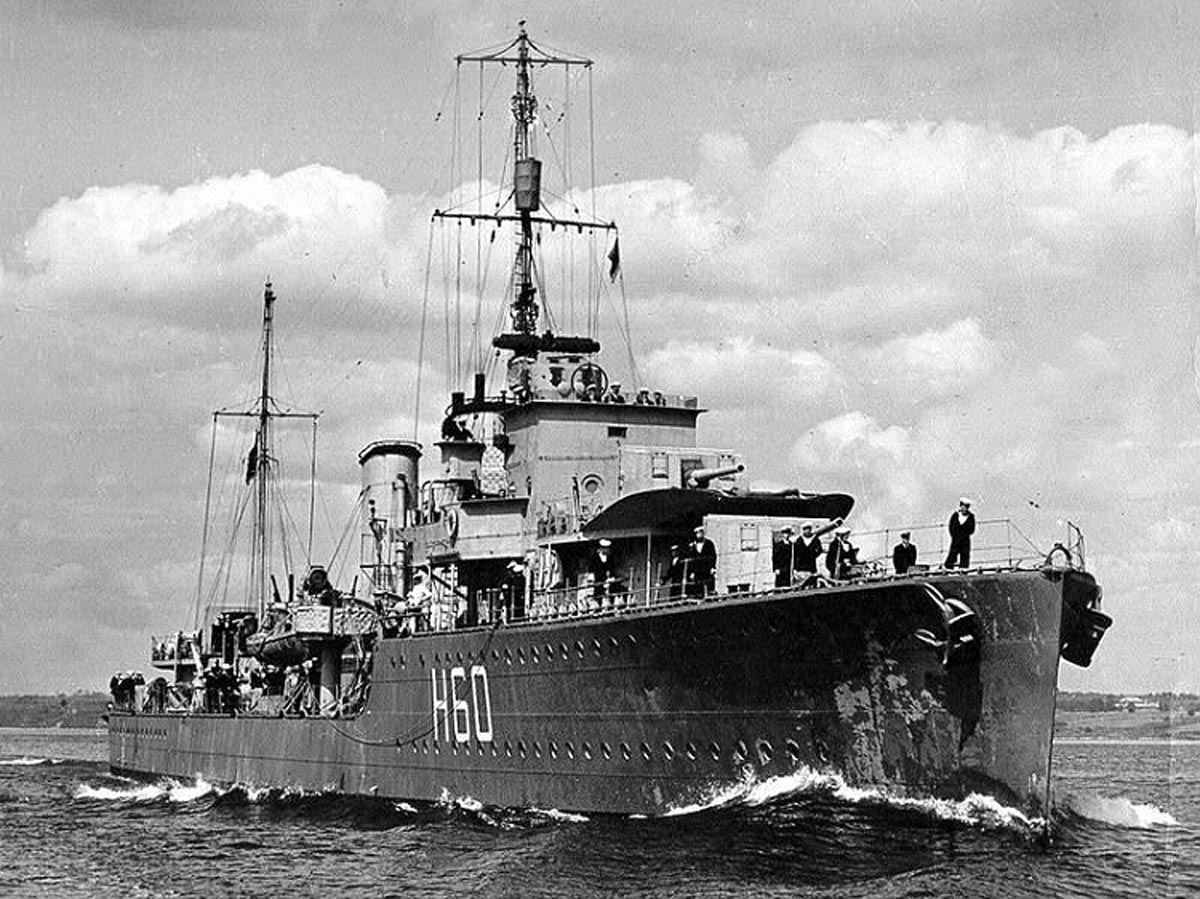
- HMCS Ottawa before 1942

History

United Kingdom
- Name: Crusader
- Ordered: 15 July 1930
- Builder: Portsmouth Dockyard
- Laid down: 12 September 1930
- Launched: 30 September 1931
- Completed: 2 May 1932
- Identification: Pennant number: H60
- Motto: Non nobis Domine; ("Not under us, Lord")
- Fate: Transferred to the Royal Canadian Navy, 15 June 1938
- Badge: On a Field Black, a Shield silver, thereon a cross Red

Canada
- Name: Ottawa
- Namesake: Ottawa River
- Commissioned: 15 June 1938
- Honours and awards: Atlantic, 1939–45
- Fate: Sunk 14 September 1942

General characteristics
- Class & type: C-class destroyer
- Displacement: 1,375 long tons (1,397 t) (standard); 1,865 long tons (1,895 t) (deep)
- Length: 329 ft (100.3 m) o/a
- Beam: 33 ft (10.1 m)
- Draught: 12 ft 6 in (3.8 m)
- Installed power: 36,000 shp (27,000 kW)
- Propulsion: 2 × shafts; 2 × Parsons geared steam turbines; 3 × Admiralty 3-drum boilers
- Speed: 36 knots (67 km/h; 41 mph)
- Range: 5,500 nmi (10,200 km; 6,300 mi) at 15 knots (28 km/h; 17 mph)
- Complement: 145
- Armament: 4 × 1 – QF 4.7-inch Mk IX guns; 1 × 1 – QF 3-inch 20 cwt anti-aircraft gun; 2 × 1 – QF 2-pounder Mk II AA guns; 2 × 4 – 21 inch (533 mm) torpedo tubes; 6 × depth charges, 3 chutes

HMS Crusader was a C-class destroyer built for the Royal Navy in the early 1930s. She saw service in the Home and Mediterranean Fleets and spent six months during the Spanish Civil War in late 1936 in Spanish waters, enforcing the arms blockade imposed by Britain and France on both sides of the conflict. Crusader was sold to the Royal Canadian Navy (RCN) in 1938 and renamed HMCS Ottawa. She was initially deployed on the Canadian Pacific Coast before World War II, but was transferred to the Atlantic three months after the war began. She served as a convoy escort during the battle of the Atlantic until sunk by the German submarine U-91 on 14 September 1942. Together with a British destroyer, she sank an Italian submarine in the North Atlantic in November 1941.

== Design and construction ==
Crusader displaced 1,375 long tons (1,397 t) at standard load and 1,865 long tons (1,895 t) at deep load. The ship had an overall length of 329 feet (100.3 m), a beam of 33 feet (10.1 m) and a draught of 12 feet 6 inches (3.8 m). She was powered by Parsons geared steam turbines, driving two shafts, which developed a total of 36,000 shaft horsepower (27,000 kW) and gave a maximum speed of 36 knots (67 km/h; 41 mph). Steam for the turbines was provided by three Admiralty 3-drum water-tube boilers. Crusader carried a maximum of 473 long tons (481 t) of fuel oil that gave her a range of 5,500 nautical miles (10,200 km; 6,300 mi) at 15 knots (28 km/h; 17 mph). The ship's complement was 145 officers and men.

The ship mounted four 45-calibre 4.7-inch Mk IX guns in single mounts, designated 'A', 'B', 'X', and 'Y' from front to rear. For anti-aircraft (AA) defence, Crusader had a single QF 3-inch 20 cwt (Note: "cwt" is the abbreviation for hundredweight, 30 cwt referring to the weight of the gun.) AA gun between her funnels, and two 40-millimetre (1.6 in) QF 2-pounder Mk II AA guns mounted on the aft end of her forecastle deck. The 3-inch (76 mm) AA gun was removed in 1936 and the 2-pounders were relocated to between the funnels. She was fitted with two above-water quadruple torpedo tube mounts for 21-inch torpedoes. Three depth-charge chutes were fitted, each with a capacity of two depth charges. After World War II began this was increased to 33 depth charges, delivered by one or two rails and two throwers.

The ship was ordered on 15 July 1930 from Portsmouth Dockyard under the 1929 Naval Programme. Crusader was laid down on 12 September 1930, launched on 30 September 1931, as the second ship to carry the name, and completed on 2 May 1932.

== Service history ==
Crusader was initially assigned to the 2nd Destroyer Flotilla of Home Fleet and remained with this flotilla for the next four years. She received her first refit at Portsmouth from 30 July to 4 September 1934. Following the Italian invasion of Abyssinia in August 1935, Crusader was sent with the rest of her flotilla to reinforce the Mediterranean Fleet the following month. From October to March 1936 she was deployed in the Red Sea to monitor Italian warship movements. Upon her return in April, the ship was refitted at Portsmouth from 27 April to 30 May. During the beginning of the Spanish Civil War in August–September 1936, the ship evacuated British nationals from Spanish ports on the Bay of Biscay. Crusader was assigned as the plane guard for the aircraft carrier Courageous from January 1937 to March 1938, aside from a brief refit between 30 March and 27 April 1937. The ship began a major refit at Sheerness on 28 April 1938 to bring her up to Canadian specifications included the installation of Type 124 ASDIC.

=== Transfer to the Royal Canadian Navy ===
The ship was purchased by the Royal Canadian Navy and she was commissioned on 15 June as HMCS Ottawa. The ship was assigned to the Canadian Pacific Coast and arrived at Esquimalt on 7 November 1938. She remained there until she was ordered to Halifax, Nova Scotia on 15 November 1939 where she escorted local convoys, including the convoy carrying half of the 1st Canadian Infantry Division to the UK on 10 December. Ottawa's stern was damaged in a collision with the tugboat Bansurf in April 1940, and repairs took two months to complete.

On 27 August 1940, Ottawa was sailed to Greenock, Scotland, and assigned to the 10th Escort Group of the Western Approaches Command upon her arrival on 4 September for convoy escort duties. In October, the ship's rear torpedo tube mount was exchanged for a 12-pounder AA gun. On 24–26 September, she rescued survivors of two British merchant ships; 55 from SS Sulairia that had been sunk by U-43 and 60 from SS Eurymedon that had been sunk by U-29. Ottawa assisted the British destroyer Harvester in sinking the Italian submarine Comandante Faà di Bruno on 7 November. By mid-November, Ottawa had been fitted with a Type 286M short-range surface-search radar, adapted from the Royal Air Force's ASV radar. This early model, however, could only scan directly forward and had to be aimed by turning the entire ship. On 23 November, she rescued 29 survivors of the grain carrier SS Bussum which had been sunk by U-100.

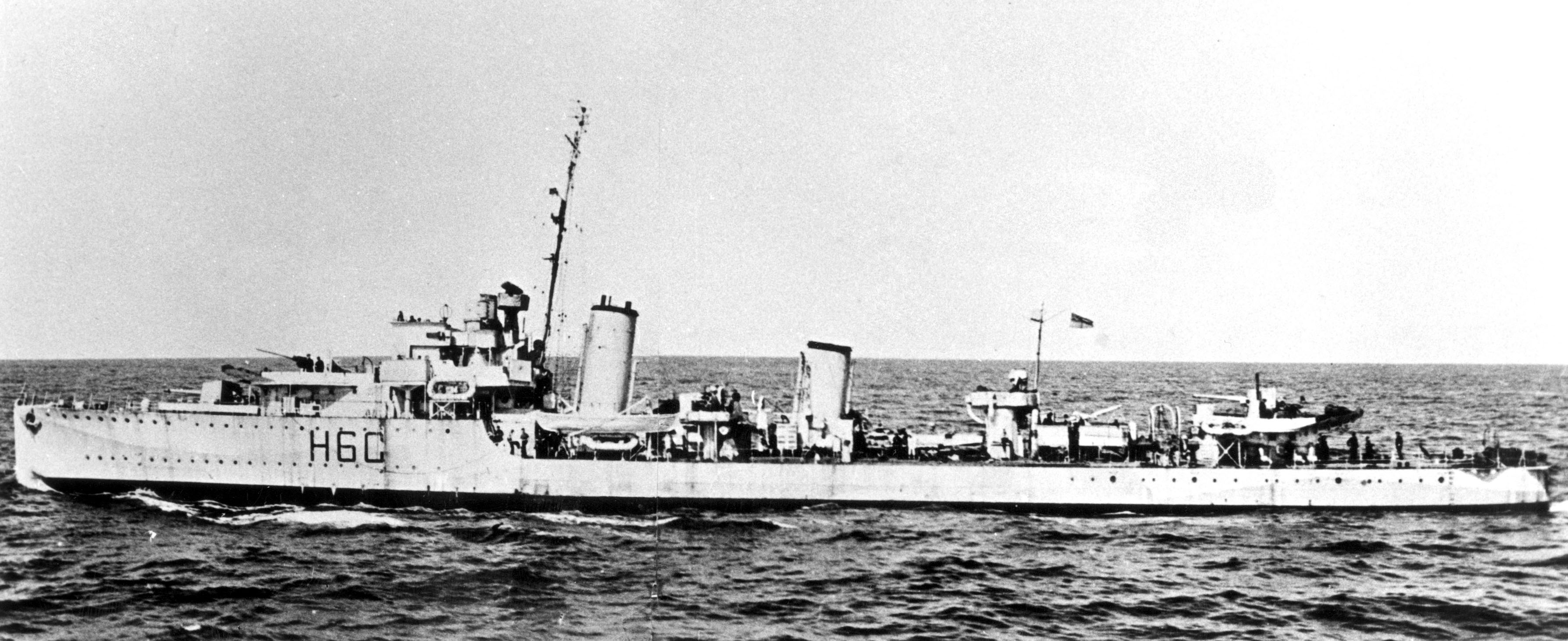
HMCS Ottawa with a 12-pounder AA gun in lieu of her rear torpedo tubes and 'Y' gun removed

Ottawa returned to Canada in June 1941 and was assigned to the RCN's Newfoundland Escort Force which covered convoys in the Mid-Atlantic. She was transferred to Escort Group C4 in May 1942. In early September, the ship's captain refused to allow her director-control tower and rangefinder to be removed in exchange for a Type 271 target indication radar. On 14 September, while escorting Convoy ON 127 500 nautical miles (930 km) east of St. John's, Newfoundland, Ottawa was torpedoed by U-91. Ten minutes later, unable to manoeuvre, she was hit by a second torpedo. She sank ten minutes later; 114 crewmen lost their lives, including the commanding officer, while nearby vessels rescued 69 survivors.

The armament changes undergone by the ship during the war are not entirely clear. Photographic evidence shows that four Oerlikon 20 mm AA guns were added, one pair to her searchlight platform and the other pair on the bridge wings, although Ottawa retained her 2-pounder guns even after the Oerlikons were added. The 'Y' gun was also removed to allow her depth charge stowage to be increased to at least 60 depth charges.

=== Trans-Atlantic convoys escorted ===
Convoy	Escort Group	Dates	Notes
HX 133		20–27 June 1941	Newfoundland to Iceland
SC 46		27 Sep – 5 Oct 1941	Newfoundland to Iceland
ON 25		19–24 Oct 1941	Iceland to Newfoundland
SC 57		1–9 Dec 1941	Newfoundland to Iceland
ON 46		17–20 Dec 1941	Iceland to Newfoundland
SC 64		12–20 Jan 1942	Newfoundland to Iceland
SC 85	MOEF group C4	31 May – 12 June 1942	Newfoundland to Northern Ireland
ON 105	MOEF group C4	20–28 June 1942	Northern Ireland to Newfoundland
HX 197	MOEF group C4	9–16 July 1942	Newfoundland to Northern Ireland
ON 116	MOEF group C4	26 July – 5 Aug 1942	Northern Ireland to Newfoundland
SC 96	MOEF group C4	15–26 Aug 1942	Newfoundland to Northern Ireland
Convoy ON 127	MOEF group C4	5–14 Sep 1942	Northern Ireland to Newfoundland
