= HMS Crescent (1931) =

C-class British and afterward Canadian destroyer

Coordinates: 45°45′N 1°30′W

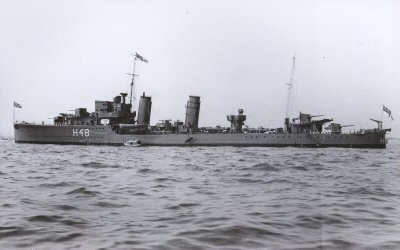
- HMS Crescent

History

United Kingdom
- Name: Crescent
- Ordered: 30 January 1930
- Builder: Vickers-Armstrongs, Barrow-in-Furness
- Laid down: 1 December 1930
- Launched: 29 September 1931
- Completed: 15 April 1932
- Commissioned: 21 April 1932
- Fate: Sold to Royal Canadian Navy, 20 October 1936

Canada
- Name: Fraser
- Namesake: Fraser River
- Acquired: 20 October 1936
- Commissioned: 17 February 1937
- Identification: Pennant number H48
- Honours and awards: Atlantic 1939-40
- Fate: Sunk in a collision with HMS Calcutta, 25 June 1940

General characteristics as built
- Class & type: C-class destroyer
- Displacement: 1,375 long tons (1,397 t) (standard); 1,865 long tons (1,895 t) (deep)
- Length: 329 ft (100.3 m) o/a
- Beam: 33 ft (10.1 m)
- Draught: 12 ft 6 in (3.8 m)
- Installed power: 36,000 shp (27,000 kW)
- Propulsion: 2 × shafts; 2 × Parsons geared steam turbines; 3 × Admiralty 3-drum boilers
- Speed: 36 knots (67 km/h; 41 mph)
- Range: 5,500 nmi (10,200 km; 6,300 mi) at 15 knots (28 km/h; 17 mph)
- Complement: 145
- Armament: 4 × 1 - QF 4.7-inch Mk IX guns; 1 × 1 - QF 3-inch 20 cwt anti-aircraft gun; 2 × 1 - QF 2-pounder Mk II AA guns; 2 × 4 - 21 inch (533 mm) torpedo tubes; 6 × depth charges, 3 chutes

HMS Crescent was a C-class destroyer which was built for the Royal Navy in the early 1930s. The ship was initially assigned to the Home Fleet, although she was temporarily deployed in the Red Sea and Indian Ocean during the Abyssinia Crisis of 1935–36. Crescent was sold to the Royal Canadian Navy in late 1936 and renamed HMCS Fraser. She was stationed on the west coast of Canada until the beginning of World War II when she was transferred to the Atlantic coast for convoy escort duties. The ship was transferred to the United Kingdom (UK) in May 1940 and helped to evacuate refugees from France upon her arrival in early June. Fraser was sunk on 25 June 1940 in a collision with the anti-aircraft cruiser HMS Calcutta while returning from one such mission.

== Design and construction ==
Crescent displaced 1,375 long tons (1,397 t) at standard load and 1,865 long tons (1,895 t) at deep load. The ship had an overall length of 329 feet (100.3 m), a beam of 33 feet (10.1 m) and a draught of 12 feet 6 inches (3.8 m). She was powered by Parsons geared steam turbines, driving two shafts, which developed a total of 36,000 shaft horsepower (27,000 kW) and gave a maximum speed of 36 knots (67 km/h; 41 mph). Steam for the turbines was provided by three Admiralty 3-drum water-tube boilers. Crescent carried a maximum of 473 long tons (481 t) of fuel oil that gave her a range of 5,500 nautical miles (10,200 km; 6,300 mi) at 15 knots (28 km/h; 17 mph). The ship's complement was 145 officers and men.

The ship mounted four 45-calibre 4.7-inch Mk IX guns in single mounts, designated 'A', 'B', 'X', and 'Y' from front to rear. For anti-aircraft (AA) defence, Crescent had a single QF 3-inch 20 cwt (Note: "cwt" is the abbreviation for hundredweight, 30 cwt referring to the weight of the gun.) AA gun between her funnels, and two 40-millimetre (1.6 in) QF 2-pounder Mk II AA guns mounted on the aft end of her forecastle deck. The 3-inch (76 mm) AA gun was removed in 1936 and the 2-pounders were relocated to between the funnels. She was fitted with two above-water quadruple torpedo tube mounts for 21-inch torpedoes. Three depth-charge chutes were fitted, each with a capacity of two depth charges. After World War II began this was increased to 33 depth charges, delivered by one or two rails and two throwers.

Crescent was ordered on 30 January 1930 as part of the 1929 Naval Programme and laid down on 1 December 1930 at Vickers-Armstrongs, Barrow-in-Furness. She was launched on 29 September 1931 and completed on 15 April 1932.

== Operational history ==
After the ship commissioned on 21 April 1932, she was assigned to the 2nd Destroyer Flotilla of the Home Fleet. Crescent collided with her sister HMS Comet at Chatham on 21 July and was under repair until 27 August. Crescent was refitted at Chatham between 30 March and 6 May 1933, before deploying to the West Indies between January and March 1934. She was given another refit at Chatham from 27 July to 3 September 1934. Crescent was detached from the Home Fleet during the Abyssinian Crisis, and deployed in the Indian Ocean and the Red Sea from September 1935 to April 1936. When the ship returned, she was refitted at Sheerness between 23 April to 13 June and placed briefly in reserve.

=== Transfer to the Royal Canadian Navy ===
Together with her sister HMS Cygnet, Crescent was sold to Canada on 20 October 1936 for a total price of £400,000. She was refitted again to meet Canadian standards, including the installation of ASDIC (sonar), and taken over by them on 1 February 1937. The ship was renamed as HMCS Fraser and commissioned into the RCN at Chatham on 17 February. Fraser was assigned to the Canadian Pacific Coast and arrived at Esquimalt on 3 May 1937. She remained there until she was ordered to the East Coast on 31 August 1939.

When World War II began on 3 September, Fraser was transiting the Panama Canal and arrived at Halifax on 15 September. She and her sisters were employed as local escorts to ocean convoys sailing from Halifax. In November the Royal Navy's North America and West Indies Station took operational control of the Canadian destroyers. The ship escorted the convoy bringing most of the 1st Canadian Infantry Division to Britain part way across the North Atlantic in mid-December. In March 1940 she was ordered to join the Jamaica Force for Caribbean patrols before being reassigned to Western Approaches Command two months later. On 26 May she left Bermuda for Britain and arrived at Plymouth on 3 June where she was pressed into service evacuating Allied troops from various French ports on the Atlantic coast. Sometime in 1940, the ship's aft set of torpedo tubes was removed and replaced by a 4-inch (102 mm) AA gun.

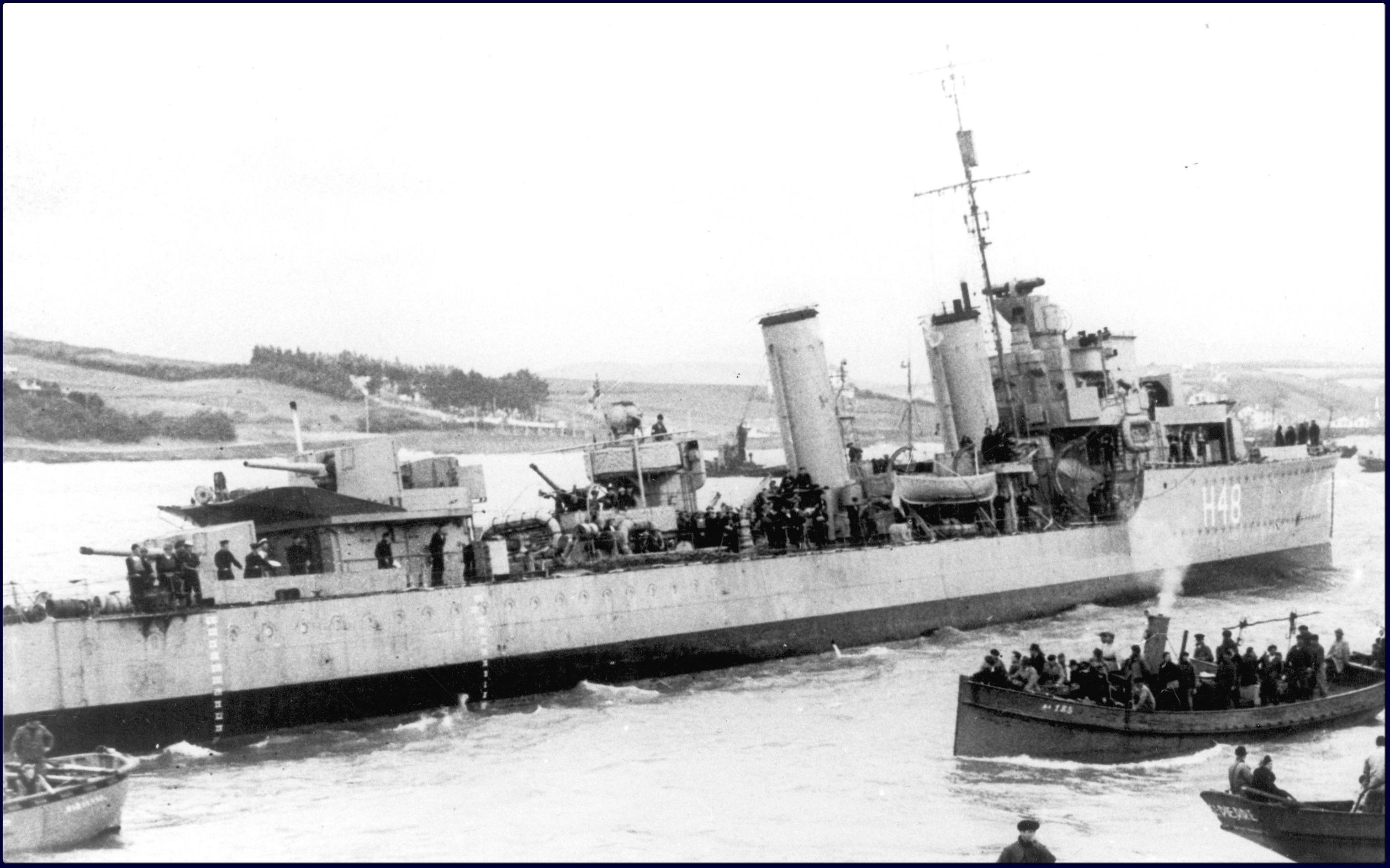
HMCS Fraser on 22 June 1940, three days before her loss

== Loss ==
On 25 June 1940, Fraser, her sister HMCS Restigouche, and the cruiser Calcutta were returning from St. Jean de Luz after rescuing refugees trapped by the German Army (Operation Aerial), when Fraser was rammed by Calcutta in the Gironde estuary. Struck forward of the bridge by the cruiser's bow, Fraser was cut in half and sank immediately. All but 45 of the ship's crew were rescued by Restigouche and other nearby ships. Many of the survivors from Fraser transferred that later summer to HMCS Margaree, and were lost when that vessel sank on 22 October 1940 as a result of a collision with the freighter MV Port Fairy.
