= HMS Delight (H38) =

British D-class destroyer

Coordinates: 50°34′25″N 2°26′1″W

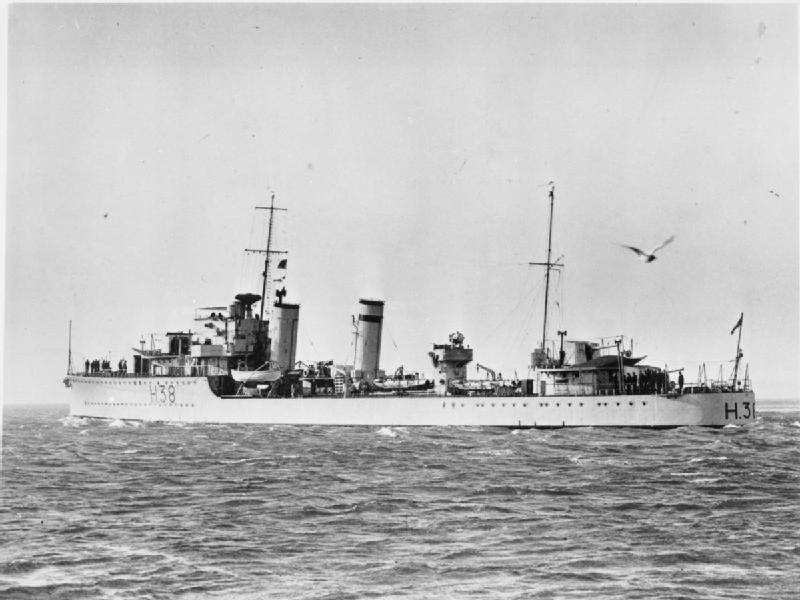

History

United Kingdom
- Name: HMS Delight
- Ordered: 2 February 1931
- Builder: Fairfield Shipbuilding and Engineering Company, Govan, Scotstoun
- Cost: £229,378
- Laid down: 22 April 1931
- Launched: 2 June 1932
- Completed: 31 January 1933
- Motto: Duris delectat virtus; ("Valour delighteth in difficulties")
- Fate: Sunk by air attack, 29 July 1940
- Badge: On a Field Green, Pan's Pipe Gold and Silver

General characteristics
- Class & type: D-class destroyer
- Displacement: 1,375 long tons (1,397 t) (standard); 1,890 long tons (1,920 t) (deep)
- Length: 329 ft (100.3 m) o/a
- Beam: 33 ft (10.1 m)
- Draught: 12 ft 6 in (3.8 m)
- Installed power: 36,000 shp (27,000 kW)
- Propulsion: 2 × shafts; 2 × Parsons geared steam turbines; 3 × Admiralty 3-drum boilers
- Speed: 36 knots (67 km/h; 41 mph)
- Range: 5,870 nmi (10,870 km; 6,760 mi) at 15 knots (28 km/h; 17 mph)
- Complement: 145
- Sensors & processing systems: ASDIC
- Armament: 4 × 4.7 in (120 mm) Mark IX guns; 1 × 12-pounder (3 in (76.2 mm)) anti-aircraft gun; 2 × 4 – QF .5 in (12.7 mm) Vickers Mark III AA machine guns; 2 × 4 – 21 inch (533 mm) torpedo tubes; 20 × depth charges, 1 rail and 2 throwers

HMS Delight was a D-class destroyer built for the Royal Navy in the early 1930s. Delight was initially assigned to the Mediterranean Fleet before she was transferred to the China Station in early 1935. She was temporarily deployed in the Red Sea during late 1935 during the Abyssinia Crisis, before returning to her duty station where she remained until mid-1939. Delight was transferred back to the Mediterranean Fleet just before the Second World War began in September 1939. She served with the Home Fleet during the Norwegian Campaign. The ship was sunk by German dive-bombers on 29 July 1940 while attempting to transit the English Channel in daylight.

== Description ==
Delight displaced 1,375 long tons (1,397 t) at standard load and 1,890 long tons (1,920 t) at deep load. The ship had an overall length of 329 feet (100.3 m), a beam of 33 feet (10.1 m) and a draught of 12 feet 6 inches (3.8 m). She was powered by Parsons geared steam turbines, driving two shafts, which developed a total of 36,000 shaft horsepower (27,000 kW) and gave a maximum speed of 36 knots (67 km/h; 41 mph). Steam for the turbines was provided by three Admiralty 3-drum water-tube boilers. Delight carried a maximum of 473 long tons (481 t) of fuel oil that gave her a range of 5,870 nautical miles (10,870 km; 6,760 mi) at 15 knots (28 km/h; 17 mph). The ship's complement was 145 officers and men.

The ship mounted four 45-calibre 4.7-inch Mark IX guns in single mounts. For anti-aircraft (AA) defence, Delight had a single 12-pounder (3-inch (76.2 mm)) gun between her funnels and two quadruple Mark I mounts for the 0.5-inch Vickers Mark III machine gun. She was fitted with two above-water quadruple torpedo tube mounts for 21-inch torpedoes. One depth charge rail and two throwers were fitted; 20 depth charges were originally carried, but this increased to 35 shortly after the war began.

== Construction and career ==
Delight was ordered on 2 February 1931 under the 1930 Naval Estimates and was laid down at the yards of the Fairfield Shipbuilding and Engineering Company, Govan, Scotstoun on 22 April 1931. She was launched on 2 June 1932 and completed on 31 January 1933, at a total cost of £229,378, excluding equipment supplied by the Admiralty, such as weapons, ammunition and wireless equipment.

The ship was used to carry out sea trials on the Mark IX torpedo after working up until 24 April 1933. Delight then joined the 1st Destroyer Flotilla in the Mediterranean and made a brief deployment to the Persian Gulf in September–November 1933. The ship was refitted at Portsmouth between 3 September and 25 October 1934 for service on the China Station with the 8th (later the 21st) Destroyer Flotilla and arrived there in January 1935. She was attached to the Mediterranean Fleet in the Red Sea from September to November 1935 during the Abyssinian Crisis. As war with Germany loomed, Delight was assigned to the Mediterranean and departed 29 August 1939 in company with several of her sisters. She arrived at Aden on 19 September and later at Alexandria where she operated with the Mediterranean Fleet for the next three months. The ship was transferred to the Home Fleet in December and arrived at Portsmouth on 30 December.

She was refitted until 27 January 1940 before she joined the 3rd Destroyer Flotilla. Delight was damaged in heavy weather on 8 April and forced to return to port for repairs. During the Norwegian Campaign, Delight escorted the aircraft carrier HMS Furious as she returned to Scapa Flow on 25 April to replenish her aircraft. On 1 May, she ferried troops to the light cruisers HMS Manchester and HMS Birmingham of the 18th Cruiser Squadron during the evacuation from Åndalsnes. Delight supported the Allied troops on 27–28 May as they recaptured Narvik before she was sent to Bodø the next day to investigate reports of a German amphibious landing. Over the next two nights, the ship and seven other destroyers evacuated British troops from Bodø. On 7–8 June, Delight escorted a troop convoy evacuating Allied troops from Narvik (Operation Alphabet).

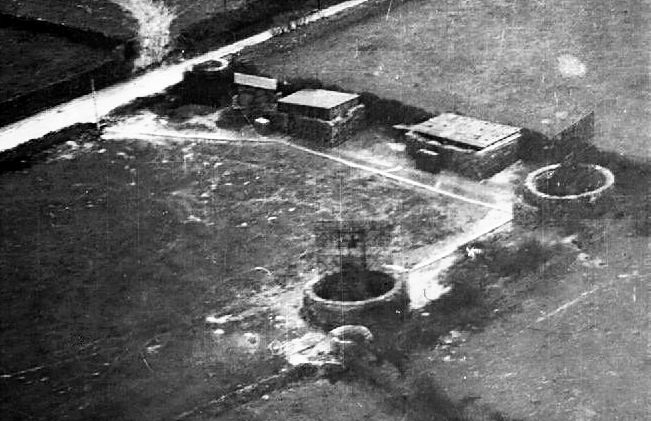
A 1941 aerial photograph of the two Freyas at Auderville

The ship went to the assistance of the armed merchant cruiser HMS Scotstoun after she had been torpedoed by U-25 on 13 June. Delight had her superheater tubes replaced at Rosyth from 21 June to 24 July. In the meantime, the Battle of Britain began on 10 July 1940 and the English Channel became the main battle ground until August. After departing Portland Harbour in daylight on 29 July, contrary to orders, the ship was detected by a Freya radar at Cherbourg and the Luftwaffe was alerted. At 19:25 12 Ju 87s belonging to III./Sturzkampfgeschwader 2 led by Gruppenkommandeur Walter Enneccerus attacked Delight, which was by now some 20 miles (32 km) off Portland Bill. She was hit by a bomb on her fo'c'sle, which caused a major fire and a subsequent explosion. The ship sank later that evening having lost six of her company in the attack.

Delight currently lies at a maximum depth of 62 metres (203 ft), broken into several sections. Her centre is upside down, her bow is broken off, and the stern is upright. As the wreck is designated as a protected place under the Protection of Military Remains Act 1986 it is illegal to enter the wreck without a licence or to interfere with the wreck or debris field in any way.
