= HMS Statice =

Modified Flower-class corvette

History

United States
- Name: Vim
- Builder: Collingwood Shipyards Ltd., Collingwood
- Laid down: In 1943 as Vim (PG 99)
- Launched: 1 April 1943
- Fate: Transferred to the Royal Navy 20 September 1943

United Kingdom
- Name: Statice
- Commissioned: 20 September 1943
- Identification: Pennant number: K281
- Fate: Returned to US Navy custody, 21 June 1946, Sold, 7 May 1947, scrapped 1961

General characteristics
- Class & type: Action-class patrol boat
- Displacement: 1,375 long tons (1,397 t)
- Length: 205 ft (62 m)
- Beam: 33 ft (10 m)
- Draft: 14 ft 7 in (4.45 m)
- Propulsion: two 3-drum express boilers, 2,750ihp vertical triple expansion Port Arthur Shipbuilding Co. engine, one shaft.
- Speed: 16.5 kn (19.0 mph; 30.6 km/h)
- Complement: 90
- Armament: 2 × 3"/50 dual purpose gun mounts; 2 × 20 mm gun mounts; 1 × Hedgehog; 4 × depth charge guns; 2 × depth charge chutes

HMS Statice, originally known as Vim, was a scrapped Action class patrol boat in the Royal Navy.

== Background ==
When the United States entered World War II at the end of 1941, the United States Navy found itself deficient in ocean escort-type vessels. A crash building program was instituted; but, to meet more immediate needs, the government contracted with shipbuilding firms in England and Canada to build Flower-class corvettes. Vim (PG-99) was one of those British-type escorts. She was launched on 1 April 1943 at the Collingwood Shipyard in Collingwood, Ontario. Nine days later, however, she was transferred to the Royal Navy under the terms of the lend-lease agreement in return for another Flower-class corvette then under construction in Canada. The British renamed her HMS Statice, and she served the Royal Navy under the name through World War II. On 21 June 1946, she was returned to the United States Navy. Though carried on the Navy list as PG-99, the corvette never saw active service with the United States Navy. She was sold on 7 May 1947. To whom she was sold and to what purpose she was put is unknown.

== Construction ==
Following the passing of the Lend-Lease Act in March 1941, the United States placed a series of orders with Canadian shipyards for a total of 15 Modified Flower-class corvettes. The ships were intended for transfer to the Royal Navy under Lend-Lease. USS Vim (Hull number PG-99) was one of four corvettes ordered on 6 December 1941. She was laid down at the Collingwood shipyard in Collingwood, Ontario on 8 November 1942, and was launched on 10 April 1943. The ship was allocated to the Royal Navy that same day, being named Statice by the Royal Navy and was completed on 20 September 1943.

As a modified Flower ship, Statice was 208 ft 4 in (63.50 m) long overall and 193 ft 0 in (58.83 m) between perpendiculars, with a beam of 33 ft 1 in (10.08 m) and a draught of 15 feet 7 inches (4.75 m) aft. Displacement of the modified Flowers ranged from 980 long tons (1,000 t) to 1,000 long tons (1,020 t) standard and 1,350 long tons (1,372 t) to 1,370 long tons (1,392 t) full load. Two Admiralty three-drum water-tube boilers provided steam to a 4-cylinder triple-expansion engine rated at 2,880 ihp (2,150 kW) which drove 1 propeller shaft.

The ship was armed with a single QF 4-inch naval gun Mk XIX forward, with anti-aircraft armament of one 2-pounder. Mk.VIII single "pom-pom" AA gun or a twin Oerlikon 20 mm cannon and six single Oerlikon guns. Anti-submarine armament consisted of a Hedgehog anti-submarine mortar, together with four depth charge throwers and two depth charge rails. 72 to 100 depth charges were carried. The ship had a complement of 109 officers and other ranks.

== Service ==
The Allied Invasion of Normandy in June 1944 saw Statice deployed escorting convoys in the English Channel between Britain and France. On the evening of 5 July 1944, Statice was part of the escort of a convoy off Beachy Head when she detected a submerged German submarine. Two Canadian destroyers, Kootenay and Ottawa were detached from Escort Group 11 to aid in hunting the U-boat. In the morning of 6 July, the three ships carried out a series of attacks with Hedgehogs and depth charges, with both Ottawa and Statice hitting with Hedgehog, with the attacks producing debris. Uncertain whether the U-boat had been sunk, the two destroyers and Statice continued to attack the stationary sonar contact through the rest of the day and into the morning of 7 July. The attacks had sunk U-678 with all hands.

Statice continued convoy escort duties to and from France until the end of August 1944, before switching to more general convoy escort duties in British coastal waters and the Western Approaches until the end of the war in Europe.

The ship returned to US control as PG-99 on 21 June 1946, but saw no service with the US Navy, and was sold on 7 May 1947. A planned conversion to a merchant ship was abandoned in 1951, and the ship was finally scrapped during 1961 at Hamburg.

== Sources ==
- Blair, Clay (2000). Hitler's U-Boat War: The Hunted 1942–1945. New York: Modern Library. ISBN 0-679-64033-9.
- Elliott, Peter (1977). Allied Escort Ships of World War II: A complete survey. London: Macdonald and Jane's. ISBN 0-356-08401-9.
- Friedman, Norman (2008). British Destroyers and Frigates: The Second World War and After. Barnsley, UK: Seaforth Publishing. ISBN 978-1-84832-015-4.
- Friedman, Norman (1987). U.S. Small Combatants: Including PT-Boats, Subchasers and the Brown-Water Navy: An Illustrated Design History. Annapolis, Maryland, USA: Naval Institute Press. ISBN 0-87021-713-5.
- Gardiner, Robert; Chesneau, Roger, eds. (1980). Conway's All the World's Fighting Ships 1922–1946. London: Conway Maritime Press. ISBN 0-85177-146-7.
- Kemp, Paul (1997). U-Boats Destroyed: German Submarine Losses in the World Wars. London: Arms & Armour Press. ISBN 1-85409-321-5.
- Lambert, John; Brown, Les (2008). Flower-Class Corvettes. St. Catharines, Ontario, Canada: Vanwall Publishing. ISBN 978-1-55068-986-0.
- Lenton, H. T. (1974). American Gunboats and Minesweepers. London: Macdonald and Jane's. ISBN 0-356-08064-1.
