= German submarine U-845 =

German World War II submarine

History

Nazi Germany
- Name: U-845
- Ordered: 20 January 1941
- Builder: DeSchiMAG AG Weser, Bremen
- Yard number: 1051
- Laid down: 20 June 1942
- Launched: 18 January 1943
- Commissioned: 1 May 1943
- Fate: Sunk in position 48°20′N 20°33′W on 10 March 1944

General characteristics
- Class & type: Type IXC/40 submarine
- Displacement: 1,144 t (1,126 long tons) surfaced; 1,257 t (1,237 long tons) submerged
- Length: 76.76 m (251 ft 10 in) o/a; 58.75 m (192 ft 9 in) pressure hull
- Beam: 6.86 m (22 ft 6 in) o/a; 4.44 m (14 ft 7 in) pressure hull
- Height: 9.60 m (31 ft 6 in)
- Draught: 4.67 m (15 ft 4 in)
- Installed power: 4,400 PS (3,200 kW; 4,300 bhp) (diesels); 1,000 PS (740 kW; 990 shp) (electric)
- Propulsion: 2 shafts; 2 × diesel engines; 2 × electric motors
- Speed: 19 knots (35 km/h; 22 mph) surfaced; 7.3 knots (13.5 km/h; 8.4 mph) submerged
- Range: 13,850 nmi (25,650 km; 15,940 mi) at 10 knots (19 km/h; 12 mph) surfaced; 63 nmi (117 km; 72 mi) at 4 knots (7.4 km/h; 4.6 mph) submerged
- Test depth: 230 m (750 ft)
- Complement: 4 officers, 44 enlisted
- Armament: 6 × torpedo tubes (4 bow, 2 stern); 22 × 53.3 cm (21 in) torpedoes; 1 × 10.5 cm (4.1 in) SK C/32 deck gun (180 rounds); 1 × 3.7 cm (1.5 in) SK C/30 AA gun; 1 × twin 2 cm FlaK 30 AA guns

Service record
- Part of: 4th U-boat Flotilla; 1 May – 31 December 1943; 10th U-boat Flotilla; 1 January – 10 March 1944
- Identification codes: M 41 779
- Commanders: Kptlt. / K.Kapt. Udo Behrens; 1 May – 9 July 1943; Kptlt. Rudolf Hoffmann; 3 July – 7 October 1943; K.Kapt. Werner Weber; 8 October 1943 – 10 March 1944
- Operations: 1 patrol: 8 January – 10 March 1944
- Victories: 1 merchant ship damaged (7,039 GRT)

German submarine U-845 was a Type IXC/40 U-boat built for Nazi Germany's Kriegsmarine during World War II.

== Design ==
German Type IXC/40 submarines were slightly larger than the original Type IXCs. U-845 had a displacement of 1,144 tonnes (1,126 long tons) when at the surface and 1,257 tonnes (1,237 long tons) while submerged. The U-boat had a total length of 76.76 m (251 ft 10 in), a pressure hull length of 58.75 m (192 ft 9 in), a beam of 6.86 m (22 ft 6 in), a height of 9.60 m (31 ft 6 in), and a draught of 4.67 m (15 ft 4 in). The submarine was powered by two MAN M 9 V 40/46 supercharged four-stroke, nine-cylinder diesel engines producing a total of 4,400 metric horsepower (3,240 kW; 4,340 shp) for use while surfaced, two Siemens-Schuckert 2 GU 345/34 double-acting electric motors producing a total of 1,000 shaft horsepower (1,010 PS; 750 kW) for use while submerged. She had two shafts and two 1.92 m (6 ft) propellers. The boat was capable of operating at depths of up to 230 metres (750 ft).

The submarine had a maximum surface speed of 18.3 knots (33.9 km/h; 21.1 mph) and a maximum submerged speed of 7.3 knots (13.5 km/h; 8.4 mph). When submerged, the boat could operate for 63 nautical miles (117 km; 72 mi) at 4 knots (7.4 km/h; 4.6 mph); when surfaced, she could travel 13,850 nautical miles (25,650 km; 15,940 mi) at 10 knots (19 km/h; 12 mph). U-845 was fitted with six 53.3 cm (21 in) torpedo tubes (four fitted at the bow and two at the stern), 22 torpedoes, one 10.5 cm (4.13 in) SK C/32 naval gun, 180 rounds, and a 3.7 cm (1.5 in) SK C/30 as well as a 2 cm (0.79 in) C/30 anti-aircraft gun. The boat had a complement of forty-eight.

== Service history ==
U-845 was ordered on 20 January 1941 from DeSchiMAG AG Weser in Bremen under the yard number 1051. Her keel was laid down on 20 June 1942. The U-boat was launched the following year on 18 January 1943. she was commissioned into service under the command of Kapitänleutnant Udo Behrens (Crew 30) in 4th U-boat Flotilla on 1 May 1943.

On 3 July 1943, Kapitänleutnant Rudolf Hoffmann (Crew 36) took over command. On her way to Gotenhafen U-845 assisted U-490 which was unable to dive and escorted her to port where they arrived on 24 July. Hoffmann handed over command to Korvettenkapitän Werner Weber (Crew 25) on 8 October 1943. On 1 January 1944 U-845, which had been transferred to the 10th U-boat Flotilla, left for operations in the North Atlantic. Via Kristiansand, Stavanger and Bergen she reached her assigned operation area off Newfoundland in February 1944. A first attack on an unescorted freighter on 6 February 1944 failed, but three days later a British steamer, Kelmscott (7,039 GRT), fell victim to U-845's torpedo. On 14 February the U-boat was spotted by an aircraft. In the subsequent attack one crew member died and two others were wounded. An attack on another unescorted freighter the next day failed to sink the ship. On 10 March 1944, U-845 made contact with convoy SC 154, but was picked up by an escort, HMCS St. Laurent, in the late afternoon and depth-charged. When the U-boat surfaced late at night, she was attacked by St. Laurent and three other escorts of 9th Escort Group, HMCS Swansea, HMCS Owen Sound and HMS Forester, with artillery, killing Weber and the bridge crew as well as the crew servicing the AA guns. The rest of the crew survived the attack and was picked up by the escorts. Swansea picked up 23, Forester 17, and St. Laurent five men.

== Summary of raiding history ==
Date	Ship Name	Nationality	Tonnage (GRT)	Fate
9 February 1944	Kelmscott	United Kingdom	7,039	Damaged

== Bibliography ==
- Busch, Rainer; Röll, Hans-Joachim (1999). German U-boat commanders of World War II: a biographical dictionary. Translated by Brooks, Geoffrey. London, Annapolis, Md: Greenhill Books, Naval Institute Press. ISBN 1-55750-186-6.
- Busch, Rainer; Röll, Hans-Joachim (1999). Der U-Boot-Krieg, 1939-1945: Deutsche U-Boot-Verluste von September 1939 bis Mai 1945 [German U-boat losses from September 1939 to May 1945] (in German). Vol. IV. Hamburg, Berlin, Bonn: Mittler. ISBN 3-8132-0514-2.
- Gröner, Eric; Jung, Dieter; Maass, Martin (1991). German Warships 1815-1945: U-boats and Mine Warfare Vessels. Vol. 2. Translated by Thomas, Keith; Magowan, Rachel. London: Conway Maritime Press. ISBN 0-85177-593-4.
