= List of British Asdic systems =

Asdic was the British version of sonar developed at the end of World War I based on the work of French physicist Paul Langevin and Russian engineer M. Constantin Chilowsky. The system was developed as a means to detect and locate submarines by their reflection of sound waves. By the start of World War II in 1939, most British destroyers and smaller vessels were fitted with it in a variety of different sets.

Name	Date of Introduction	Dome	Notes
Type 112	1920		Fitted to some V and W-class destroyers and small escorts like P and PC-class sloops
Type 119	1930		B-class destroyers
Type 121	Tested 1931 in Woolston	First production retractable dome	Fitted in D, E, F, and G-class destroyers, some cruisers and the sloop Enchantress
Type 122		Detachable	Designed for trawlers and other auxiliaries with a turbo alternator
Type 123	1934	Detachable	Replaced Type 122, designed for ships with a high-frequency motor alternator
Type 124	1934	Retractable	C, H, I, J, K, and Tribal-class destroyers, some sloops and older destroyers. First system with a range recorder
Type 127	1937	As per Type 122	Designed for sloops, but widely fitted in frigates and older destroyers. Electronics as per Type 123
Type 128	Tested 1937 in Acheron	Retractable	A, L, and Hunt-class destroyers
Type 141	?	No dome, but some modified with British dome as Type 141A	American QCJ/QCL system in Lend-Lease Town-class destroyers, modified with British range and bearing recorders
Type 144	Trials in Kingfisher in 1941	Retractable	First set specifically intended for ahead-throwing weapons like Hedgehog
Type 145	1942?	Detachable	Like Type 144, but intended for slower escorts
Type 147	Sea trials aboard Ambuscade, May 1943	?	The 147 set with its beamforming 'sword' transducer produced a horizontal 'fan' beam that could give a depth estimate. This, as well as the Q attachment, improved targeting for directable weapons, like the new Squid, that were capable of making use of this information.
Q attachment	1943	NA	Depth-measuring set with 3° horizontal beam, modification to existing Type 144 systems
