= HMCS Owen Sound =

Canadian WWII naval corvette (1943–45)

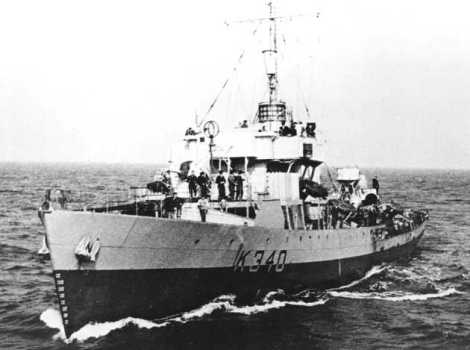
- HMCS Owen Sound

History

Canada
- Name: HMCS Owen Sound
- Namesake: Owen Sound, Ontario
- Ordered: 2 January 1942
- Builder: Collingwood Shipyards Ltd., Collingwood
- Laid down: 11 November 1942
- Launched: 15 June 1943
- Commissioned: 17 November 1943
- Decommissioned: 19 July 1945
- Identification: Pennant number: K340
- Honours and awards: Atlantic 1944–45
- Fate: Sold for mercantile use 1946, scrapped 1974

General characteristics
- Class & type: Flower-class corvette (modified)
- Displacement: 1,015 long tons (1,031 t; 1,137 short tons)
- Length: 208 ft (63.40 m)o/a
- Beam: 33 ft (10.06 m)
- Draught: 11 ft (3.35 m)
- Propulsion: single shaft; 2 × oil fired water tube boilers; 1 triple-expansion reciprocating steam engine; 2,750 ihp (2,050 kW)
- Speed: 16 knots (29.6 km/h)
- Range: 7,400 nautical miles (13,705 km) at 10 knots (18.5 km/h)
- Complement: 90
- Sensors & processing systems: 1 Type 271 SW2C radar; 1 Type 144 sonar
- Armament: 1 × 4 in (102 mm) QF Mk XIX naval gun; 1 × 2-pounder Mk.VIII single "pom-pom"; 2 × 20 mm Oerlikon single; 1 × Hedgehog A/S mortar; 4 × Mk.II depth charge throwers; 2 × depth charge rails with 70 depth charges

HMCS Owen Sound was a modified Flower-class corvette that served with the Royal Canadian Navy during the Second World War. She fought primarily in the Battle of the Atlantic as a convoy escort. She was named for Owen Sound, Ontario.

== Background ==
Flower-class corvettes like Owen Sound serving with the Royal Canadian Navy during the Second World War were different from earlier and more traditional sail-driven corvettes. The "corvette" designation was created by the French as a class of small warships; the Royal Navy borrowed the term for a period but discontinued its use in 1877. During the hurried preparations for war in the late 1930s, Winston Churchill reactivated the corvette class, needing a name for smaller ships used in an escort capacity, in this case based on a whaling ship design. The generic name "flower" was used to designate the class of these ships, which – in the Royal Navy – were named after flowering plants.

Corvettes commissioned by the Royal Canadian Navy during the Second World War were named after communities for the most part, to better represent the people who took part in building them. This idea was put forth by Admiral Percy W. Nelles. Sponsors were commonly associated with the community for which the ship was named. Royal Navy corvettes were designed as open sea escorts, while Canadian corvettes were developed for coastal auxiliary roles which was exemplified by their minesweeping gear. Eventually the Canadian corvettes would be modified to allow them to perform better on the open seas.

== Construction ==
Owen Sound was ordered 2 January 1942 as part of the 1942–43 modified Flower-class building programme. This programme was known as the Increased Endurance. Many changes were made, all from lessons that had been learned in previous versions of the Flower class. The bridge was made a full deck higher and built to naval standards instead of the more civilian-like bridges of previous versions. The platform for the 4-inch main gun was raised to minimize the amount of spray over it and to provide a better field of fire. It was also connected to the wheelhouse by a wide platform that was now the base for the Hedgehog anti-submarine mortar that this version was armed with. Along with the new Hedgehog, this version got the new QF 4-inch Mk XIX main gun, which was semi-automatic, used fixed ammunition and had the ability to elevate higher giving it an anti-aircraft ability.

Other superficial changes to this version include an upright funnel and pressurized boiler rooms which eliminated the need for hooded ventilators around the base of the funnel. This changes the silhouette of the corvette and made it more difficult for submariners to tell which way the corvette was laying.

Owen Sound was laid down by Collingwood Shipyards Ltd. at Collingwood, Ontario 11 November 1942 and was launched 15 June 1943. She was commissioned into the Royal Canadian Navy 17 November 1943 at Collingwood under the command of Acting Lt. Commander John Manuel Watson. Owen Sound had one significant refit during her war career. The refit took place at Halifax, Nova Scotia beginning in February 1945 and finished mid-May 1945.

== Service history ==
After arriving at Halifax and working up, Owen Sound was assigned to escort group EG 9 in February 1944. On 10 March 1944 while escorting SC 157 she aided HMCS St. Laurent, HMCS Swansea and HMS Forester in sinking U-845.

In May 1944, Owen Sound transferred to the Mid-Ocean Escort Force as a trans-Atlantic convoy escort. She was initially assigned to escort group C-2 and in October, C-7 before departing for refit in February 1945. She did not return to active service before the end of the war.

Owen Sound was paid off at Sorel, Quebec 19 July 1945. She was transferred to War Assets Corporation and was sold to United Ship Corporation. She reappeared as the Greek-flagged 1,039 GRT Cadio and last appeared on Lloyd’s Register in 1967–68. The ship was broken up at Piraeus, Greece in August 1964.
