= Italian submarine Comandante Faà di Bruno =

History

Italy
- Name: Comandante Faà di Bruno
- Namesake: Emilio Faà di Bruno
- Laid down: 28 April 1938
- Launched: 18 June 1939
- Commissioned: 23 October 1939
- Fate: Sunk 8 November 1940

General characteristics
- Class & type: Marcello-class submarine
- Displacement: 1,043 t (1,027 long tons) surfaced; 1,290 t (1,270 long tons) submerged
- Length: 73 m (239 ft 6 in)
- Beam: 7.19 m (23 ft 7 in)
- Draft: 5.1 m (16 ft 9 in)
- Installed power: 3,600 bhp (2,700 kW) (diesels); 1,100 hp (820 kW) (electric motors)
- Propulsion: Diesel-electric; 2 × diesel engines; 2 × electric motors
- Speed: 17.4 knots (32.2 km/h; 20.0 mph) surfaced; 8 knots (15 km/h; 9.2 mph) submerged
- Range: 7,500 nmi (13,900 km; 8,600 mi) at 19.47 knots (36.06 km/h; 22.41 mph) surfaced; 120 nmi (220 km; 140 mi) at 3 knots (5.6 km/h; 3.5 mph) submerged
- Test depth: 100 m (328.1 ft)
- Complement: 58
- Armament: 8 × 533 mm (21 in) torpedo tubes (4 bow, 4 stern); 2 × 100 mm (4 in)/47 guns; 4 × 13.2 mm (0.52 in) machine guns

Comandante Faà di Bruno, also referred to by its shortened name Faà di Bruno, was a Marcello-class submarine built for the Royal Italian Navy (Regia Marina) in the 1930s. It was sunk in 1940 by British and Canadian destroyers escorting a convoy.

== Design and description ==
The Marcello-class submarines were designed as improved versions of the preceding Glauco class. They displaced 1,043 metric tons (1,027 long tons) surfaced and 1,290 metric tons (1,270 long tons) submerged. The submarines were 73 meters (239 ft 6 in) long, had a beam of 7.19 meters (23 ft 7 in) and a draft of 5.1 meters (16 ft 9 in).

For surface running, the boats were powered by two 1,800-brake-horsepower (1,342 kW) diesel engines, each driving one propeller shaft. When submerged each propeller was driven by a 550-horsepower (410 kW) electric motor. They could reach 17.4 knots (32.2 km/h; 20.0 mph) on the surface and 8 knots (15 km/h; 9.2 mph) underwater. On the surface, the Marcello class had a range of 7,500 nmi (13,900 km; 8,600 mi) at 9.4 knots (17.4 km/h; 10.8 mph), submerged, they had a range of 120 nmi (220 km; 140 mi) at 3 knots (5.6 km/h; 3.5 mph).

The boats were armed with eight internal 53.3 cm (21.0 in) torpedo tubes, four each in the bow and stern. One reload were stowed for each tube, which gave them a total of sixteen torpedoes. They were also armed with two 100 mm (4 in) guns and four 13.2 mm (0.52 in) machine guns for combat on the surface.

== Construction and career ==
It was sunk on 8 November 1940 by a combined effort from the destroyers HMCS Ottawa of the Royal Canadian Navy, and HMS Harvester of the Royal Navy after attacking Convoy HX 84 they were defending.

== See also ==
Italian submarines of World War II
