= HMS Diana (H49) =

British D-class destroyer

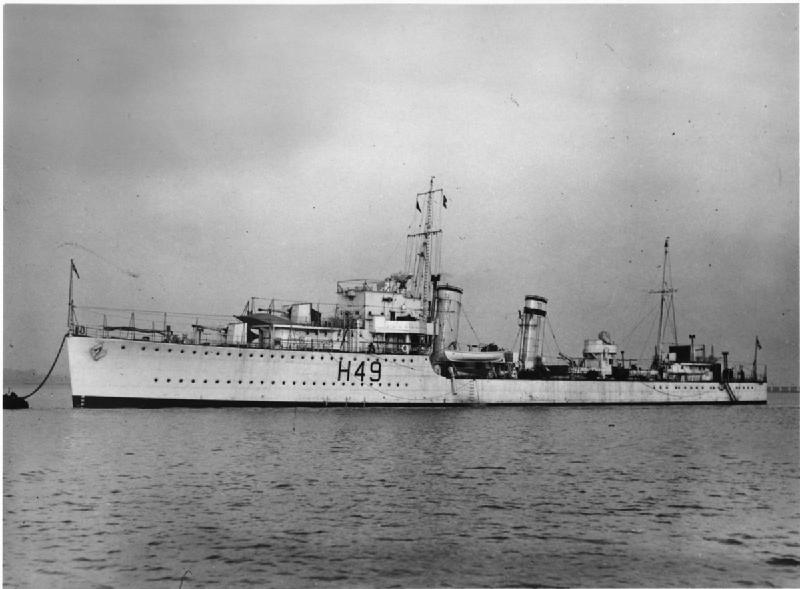
- Diana at a buoy

History

United Kingdom
- Name: Diana
- Ordered: 2 February 1931
- Builder: Palmers Shipbuilding and Iron Company, Hebburn-on-Tyne
- Laid down: 12 June 1931
- Launched: 16 June 1932
- Completed: 21 December 1932
- Identification: Pennant number: H49
- Motto: Certo Dirigo ictu; ("I aim with sure blow")
- Fate: Transferred to the Royal Canadian Navy, 6 September 1940
- Badge: On a Field Blue, a crescent Moon Silver; Ship's badge

Canada
- Name: Margaree
- Namesake: Margaree River
- Commissioned: 6 September 1940
- Honours and awards: Atlantic 1940
- Fate: Sunk following collision, 22 October 1940

General characteristics as built
- Class & type: D-class destroyer
- Displacement: 1,375 long tons (1,397 t) (standard)
- Length: 329 ft (100.3 m) (o/a)
- Beam: 33 ft (10.1 m)
- Draught: 12 ft 6 in (3.8 m)
- Installed power: 3 × Admiralty 3-drum boilers; 36,000 shp (27,000 kW)
- Propulsion: 2 × shafts; 2 × geared steam turbines
- Speed: 36 knots (67 km/h; 41 mph)
- Range: 5,870 nmi (10,870 km; 6,760 mi) at 15 knots (28 km/h; 17 mph)
- Complement: 145
- Sensors & processing systems: ASDIC
- Armament: 4 × single 4.7 in (120 mm) guns; 1 × single 12 pdr (3 in (76.2 mm)) AA gun; 2 × single 2 pdr (40 mm (1.6 in)) AA guns; 2 × quadruple 21 in (533 mm) torpedo tubes; 2 × throwers, 1 × rail for 20 depth charges

HMS Diana was a D-class destroyer of the Royal Navy. Ordered in 1931, the ship was constructed by Palmers Shipbuilding and Iron Company, and entered naval service in 1932. Diana was initially assigned to the Mediterranean Fleet before she was transferred to the China Station in early 1935. She was temporarily deployed in the Red Sea during late 1935 during the Abyssinia Crisis, before returning to her duty station where she remained until mid-1939. Diana was transferred back to the Mediterranean Fleet just before the Second World War began in September 1939. She served with the Home Fleet during the Norwegian Campaign. The ship was transferred to the Royal Canadian Navy in 1940 and renamed HMCS Margaree. She served for just over a month with the Canadians before being sunk in a collision with a large freighter she was escorting on 22 October 1940.

== Description ==
The D-class destroyers displaced 1,375 long tons (1,397 t) at standard load and 1,890 long tons (1,920 t) at deep load. The ship had an overall length of 329 feet (100.3 m), a beam of 33 feet (10.1 m) and a draught of 12 feet 6 inches (3.8 m). She was powered by Parsons geared steam turbines, driving two shafts, which developed a total of 36,000 shaft horsepower (27,000 kW) and gave a maximum speed of 36 knots (67 km/h; 41 mph). Steam for the turbines was provided by three Admiralty 3-drum water-tube boilers. Diana carried a maximum of 473 long tons (481 t) of fuel oil that gave her a range of 5,870 nautical miles (10,870 km; 6,760 mi) at 15 knots (28 km/h; 17 mph). The ship's complement was 145 officers and men.

The ships mounted four 4.7-inch (120 mm) Mark IX guns in single mounts. For anti-aircraft (AA) defence, Diana had a single 12-pounder 20 cwt (3 in (76 mm)) (Note: "Cwt" is the abbreviation for hundredweight, 20 cwt referring to the weight of the gun.) AA gun between her funnels and two QF 2-pounder (1.6 in (40 mm)) Mk II AA guns mounted on the side of her bridge. She was fitted with two rotating quadruple torpedo tube mounts for 21-inch (533 mm) torpedoes amidships. One depth charge rail and two throwers were fitted; 20 depth charges were originally carried, but this increased to 35 shortly after the war began.

== Construction and career ==
=== With the Royal Navy ===
Diana was ordered under the 1930 Naval Estimates on 2 February 1931 from Palmers Shipbuilding and Iron Company. She was laid down at the company's shipyard in Hebburn-on-Tyne on 12 June 1931, launched on 16 June 1932 and finally commissioned into the Navy on 21 December 1932. She cost a total of £229,502, excluding the weapons and the communications equipment which were supplied by the Admiralty. The ship was initially assigned to the 1st Destroyer Flotilla in the Mediterranean and made a brief deployment to the Persian Gulf and Red Sea in September–November 1933. While in the Mediterranean, Diana was commanded by Geoffrey Oliver for a time. The ship was refitted at Sheerness Dockyard between 3 September and 23 October 1934 for service on the China Station with the 8th (later the 21st) Destroyer Flotilla and arrived there in January 1935. However she visited Bristol and moored at St Augustine's Bridge from 20 June to 1 July 1935. She was attached to the Mediterranean Fleet in the Red Sea from September 1935 to May 1936 during the Abyssinian Crisis and made port visits in Bombay and East Africa before returning to Hong Kong on 7 August. On one occasion in 1937 Diana investigated why a lighthouse near Amoy was not lit and discovered that it had been attacked by pirates. She remained in the Far East until the rise in tensions before World War II began prompted her recall in August 1939.

With the outbreak of war, Diana and her sisters Duncan, Daring, and Dainty, were assigned to the Mediterranean Fleet, arriving there in October. She was repaired at Malta during November and rejoining the fleet in December where she was briefly placed on contraband control duties before she was transferred to the Home Fleet's 3rd Destroyer Flotilla. Diana arrived in Home waters in January 1940, and was assigned to the 3rd Destroyer Flotilla. Here her duties included screening units of the Home Fleet and carrying out patrols. On 15 February, the ship escorted HMS Duncan as she towed by tugs from Invergordon to the Forth for permanent repairs, after the latter had been damaged in a collision whilst escorting a convoy.

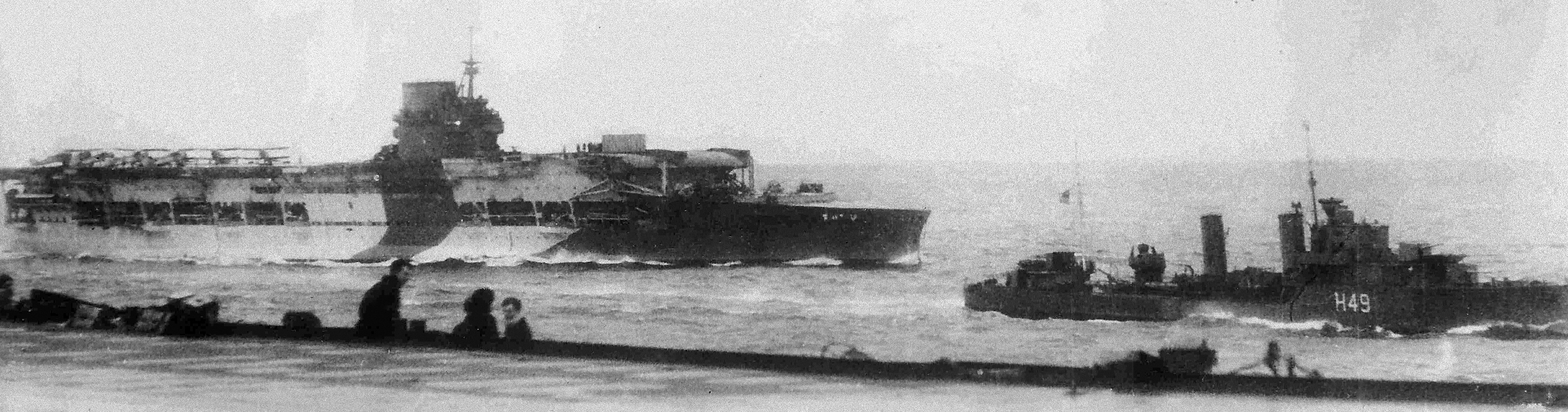
HMS Diana (right) and HMS Glorious (left) photographed in May 1940 from the deck of HMS Ark Royal.

During the Norwegian Campaign, Diana escorted the aircraft carrier HMS Furious as she returned to Scapa Flow on 25 April to replenish her aircraft. On 1 May, she screened the light cruisers HMS Manchester and HMS Birmingham of the 18th Cruiser Squadron as they covered the evacuations from Åndalsnes and the ship transported the Norwegian Commander-in-chief Major General Otto Ruge from Molde to Tromsø. The ship escorted the carriers HMS Glorious and Furious as the latter flew off RAF Gloster Gladiators fighters to Bardufoss airfield on 21 May. Ten days later Diana escorted the carriers HMS Ark Royal and Furious during Operation Alphabet, the Allied withdrawal from Norway.

=== Transfer to Canada ===
The ship was taken in hand for refit and repair in London in July. After their completion, Diana was transferred to the Royal Canadian Navy to replace HMCS Fraser which had been sunk in a collision on 25 June 1940 with the British anti-aircraft cruiser HMS Calcutta. The ship was formally commissioned into the Royal Canadian Navy as HMCS Margaree on 6 September 1940. On 17 October, she escorted Convoy OL8 bound for Canada, but the ship was sunk five days later when she was cut in two by the freighter MV Port Fairy just after midnight on 22 October. Of the 176 men aboard Margaree at the time, six officers and 28 ratings in the stern section, which remained afloat, were rescued by Port Fairy; the other 142 were lost.
