= Belet =

Belet may refer to:

- Robert A. Belet (1914–42), a United States Marine Corps Silver Star recipient
- USS Belet (DE-599), a United States Navy destroyer escort converted during construction into the high-speed transport USS Belet (APD-109)
- USS Belet (APD-109), a United States Navy high-speed transport in commission from 1945 to 1946
- Belet (surname)

== See also ==
- Bellet
- Bellett
