= Belet (surname) =

Belet is a surname. Notable people with this name include:

- Édouard Belet (1893–1988), Swiss wrestler
- Ivo Belet (born 1959), Belgian politician
- Michael Belet (disambiguation), multiple people
- Robert A. Belet (1914–1942), American soldier
- Tayfun Belet, Turkish film director, screenwriter, producer and film editor

== See also ==
- Bellet
- Bellett
