= Michael Belet =

Michael Belet may refer to:

- Michael Belet (senior) (fl. 1182), English judge of late 12th century
- Michael Belet (junior) (fl. 1238), English judge of early 13th century
