= Treasury-class cutter =

United States Coast Guard cutter class

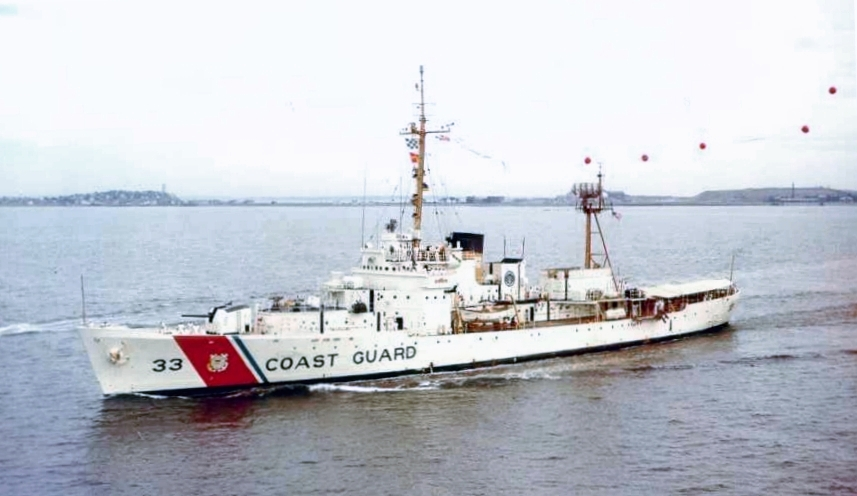
- Duane in 1968

Class overview
- Name: Treasury class
- Operators: United States Coast Guard
- Succeeded by: Hamilton-class cutter
- Completed: 7
- Canceled: 3
- Lost: 1
- Preserved: USCGC Ingham; USCGC Taney

General characteristics
- Type: Cutter
- Displacement: 2,216 long tons (2,252 t; 2,482 short tons)
- Length: 327 ft (99.67 m) o/a
- Beam: 41 ft (12.50 m)
- Draught: 12.5 ft (3.81 m)
- Propulsion: 2 × oil-fueled Babcock & Wilcox boilers; Westinghouse geared turbines; 2 shafts; 6,200 ihp (4,600 kW)
- Speed: 20 knots (37.0 km/h; 23.0 mph)
- Range: 12,300 nautical miles (22,780 km; 14,155 mi) at 11 knots (20.4 km/h; 12.7 mph)
- Complement: 125
- Armament: As built: 2 × 5 in (127 mm)/51 cal. guns; 2 × 6-pounder guns; 8 × .50-cal. machine guns
- Aircraft carried: 1 x Grumman JF-2 Duck or Curtiss SOC-4

The Treasury-class cutter was a group of seven high endurance cutters launched by the United States Coast Guard between 1936 and 1937. The class were called the "Treasury class" because they were each named for former Secretaries of the Treasury. These ships were also collectively known as the "327's" as they were all 327 feet (100 m) in length. The Treasury-class cutters proved versatile and long-lived warships. Most served the United States for over 40 years, including with distinction through World War II, Korea, and Vietnam.

In the words of naval historian John M. Waters, Jr., they were their nation's "maritime workhorses. The 327s battled through the 'Bloody Winter' of 1942–43 in the North Atlantic," with the ships fighting off and destroying German U-boats, and rescuing survivors from torpedoed convoy ships. Roles of the 327s included serving as amphibious task force flagships in World War II, pilot search and rescue (SAR) during the Korean War, and a critical component of Operation Market Time during the Vietnam War. "Most recently, these ships-that-wouldn't-die have done duty in fisheries patrol and drug interdiction. Built for only $2.5 million each, in terms of cost effectiveness we may never see the likes of these cutters again."

Commencing in the late 1970s the Treasury-class cutters were gradually replaced or their duties taken over by newer and larger Hamilton-class 378-foot (115 m) high endurance cutters.

== Design and construction ==
The 327s were designed to meet changing missions of the service as it emerged from the Prohibition era. Because the air passenger trade was expanding both at home and overseas, the Coast Guard believed that cutter-based aircraft would be essential for future high-seas search and rescue. Also, during the mid-1930s, narcotics smuggling, mostly opium, was on the increase, and long-legged, fairly fast cutters were needed to curtail it. The Treasury class were an attempt to develop a 20-knot (37 km/h) cutter capable of carrying an airplane in a hangar.

The final 327-foot (100 m) design was based on the Erie-class US Navy gunboats; the machinery plant and hull below the waterline were identical. This standardization would save money—always paramount in the Coast Guard's mind, as the cutters were built in U.S. Navy shipbuilding yards. Thirty-two preliminary designs based upon the Erie class were drawn up before one was finally selected. The healthy sheer forward and the high slope in the deck in the wardrooms was known as the "Hunnewell Hump." Commander (Constructor) F. G. Hunnewell, USCG, was the head of the Construction and Repair Department at that time.

Displacing 2,350 tons with a 12-foot (3.7 m) draft, these ships had a maximum speed of 20 knots (37 km/h). They had crews of between 120 and 230 depending on whether they were serving in peace or wartime. The ships were originally built with two open centerline 5"/51 caliber gun mounts forward, and carried a single aircraft, either a Grumman JF-2 Duck or Curtiss SOC-4, aft. Various arrangements of 3"/50 and 5"/51 guns and depth charge throwers were installed aft when the planes were removed in 1940–41. Postwar armament typically included Hedgehog and an enclosed 5"/38 caliber gun mount forward and MK 32 torpedo tube systems tubes aft.

== World War II service ==
The 327s were known for their high kill rate during World War II. Campbell demonstrated Treasury-class anti-submarine warfare suitability escorting convoy HX 159 in November 1941. With a kill rate of 0.57 per ship, the Treasury class were the most successful American anti-submarine warships. (US Navy Destroyer Escorts had a kill rate of 0.1) Treasury-class cutters served as leaders of Mid-Ocean Escort Force group A3 during the winter of 1942–43.

- Ingham escorted westbound convoy ONS 92.
- Campbell and Ingham escorted eastbound HX 190.
- Campbell, Ingham and Duane escorted westbound ONS 102.
- Spencer escorted eastbound SC 95 and westbound ON 125.
- Campbell and Spencer escorted eastbound SC 100 and westbound ON 135.
- Campbell escorted eastbound HX 212 and westbound ON 145.
- Spencer escorted eastbound SC 111 and westbound ONS 156.
- Campbell and Spencer escorted eastbound HX 223 and westbound Convoy ON 166.
- Spencer escorted eastbound Convoy SC 121 and westbound ON 175.
- Spencer and Duane escorted the final A3 convoy HX 233 eastbound.

Bibb and Ingham participated in the battles of Convoy SC 118 and Convoy SC 121.

Taney served in the Pacific and was uniquely armed with four enclosed 5"/38 gun mounts in centerline positions where the Erie-class gunboats mounted 6"/47 guns. The six surviving cutters were converted to AGCs (Amphibious Force Flagships) towards the end of World War II. This conversion included the addition of 35 radio receivers and 25 transmitters, as well as changes to the superstructure and additional masts. Taney also has the distinction of being one of only two military vessels still afloat that was present during the Pearl Harbor attack, 7 December 1941.

== Fate ==
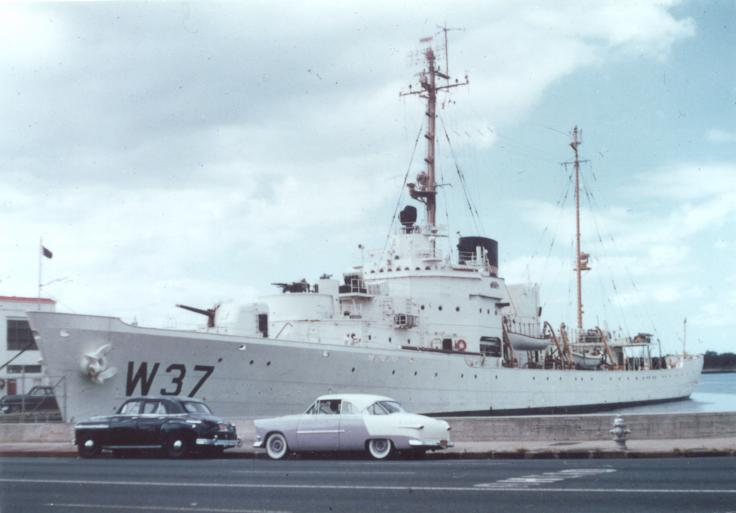
USCGC Taney at Honolulu in 1958

With the exception of Hamilton, which was torpedoed and sunk 10 miles (16 km) off Iceland 29 January 1942, all of the Treasury-class ships led very long lives. Bibb and Duane were sunk as artificial reefs off the coast of Florida in 1987. Campbell was sunk by the US Navy in a training exercise on 29 November 1984. Spencer was sold 8 October 1981 for scrap. Taney is currently a museum ship at the Baltimore Maritime Museum, in Baltimore, Maryland, and Ingham is part of the Key West Maritime Museum in Key West, Florida.

== Ships in class ==
The seven Treasury-class Coast Guard Cutters were:

Name	Hull No.	Builder's No.	Builder	Laid Down	Launched	Commissioned	Decommissioned	Fate	Sources
Bibb	WPG-31; WAGC-31; WHEC-31	71	Charleston Navy Yard	15 August 1935	14 January 1937	10 March 1937	30 September 1985	Sunk as artificial reef off the Florida Keys, 28 November 1987	
Campbell	WPG-32; WAGC-32; WHEC-32	65	Philadelphia Naval Shipyard	1 May 1935	3 June 1936	16 June 1936	1 April 1982	Sunk as target off Hawaii, 29 November 1984	
Duane	WPG-33; WAGC-33; WHEC-33	67	Philadelphia Naval Shipyard	1 May 1935	3 June 1936	1 August 1936	1 August 1985	Sunk as artificial reef off Key Largo, Florida, 27 November 1987	
Alexander Hamilton	WPG-34	69	New York Navy Yard	11 September 1935	6 January 1937	4 March 1937	29 January 1942	Sunk by U-132 off Iceland, 29 January 1942	
Ingham	WPG-35; WAGC-35; WHEC-35	66	Philadelphia Naval Shipyard	1 May 1935	3 June 1936	12 September 1936	27 May 1988	Preserved as museum ship in Key West, Florida	
Spencer	WPG-36; WAGC-36; WHEC-36	70	New York Navy Yard	11 September 1935	6 January 1937	1 March 1937	23 January 1974	Served as engineer training ship at Coast Guard Yard until 15 December 1980. Sold for scrap, 8 October 1981	
Taney	WPG-37; WAGC-37; WHEC-37	68	Philadelphia Naval Shipyard	1 May 1935	3 June 1936	24 October 1936	7 December 1986	Preserved as museum ship in Baltimore, Maryland	
