= USCGC Duane =

United States Coast Guard cutter

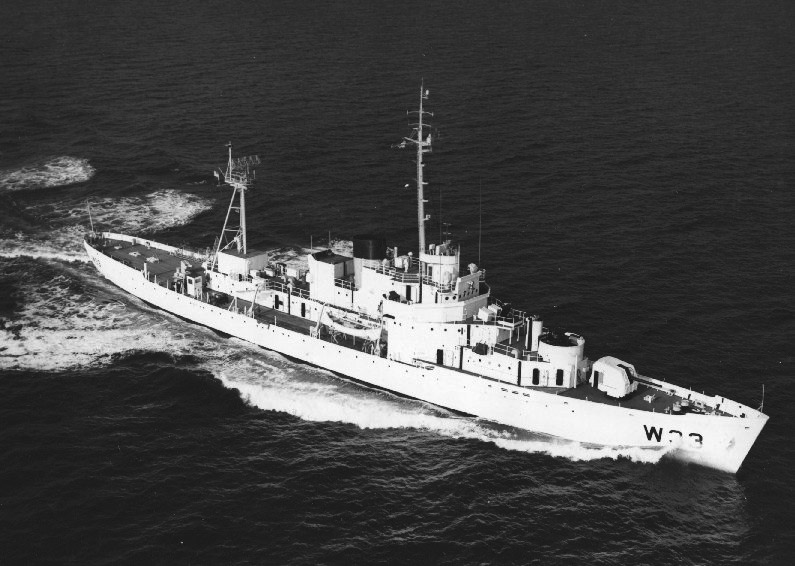
- USCGC Duane under way in the early 1960s

History

United States
- Name: USCGC Duane (WPG-33)
- Namesake: William J. Duane
- Builder: Philadelphia Navy Yard, Pennsylvania
- Cost: $2,468,460
- Yard number: CG-67
- Laid down: 1 May 1935
- Launched: 3 June 1936
- Commissioned: 1 August 1936
- Decommissioned: 1 August 1985
- Identification: Call sign: NRDD
- Fate: Sunk as artificial reef; off Key Largo, Florida; 27 November 1987

General characteristics
- Class & type: Treasury-class cutter
- Displacement: 2,350 long tons (2,388 t)
- Length: 327 ft (100 m)
- Beam: 41 ft (12 m)
- Draft: 12 ft 6 in (3.81 m)
- Propulsion: 2 × Westinghouse double-reduction geared turbine engines, 6,200 shp (4,623 kW); 2 × Babcock & Wilcox sectional express, air-encased, 400 psi, 200° superheat boilers; 2 × 9 ft (2.7 m) three-bladed propellers
- Speed: 20.5 knots (38.0 km/h; 23.6 mph)
- Range: 8,000 nmi (15,000 km; 9,200 mi) at 11 kn (20 km/h; 13 mph)
- Complement: 1937: 123 (12 officers, 4 warrants, 107 enlisted men); 1941: 223 (16 officers, 5 warrants, 202 enlisted men); 1966: 147 (10 officers, 3 warrants, 134 enlisted men)
- Electronic warfare & decoys: 1942: HF/DF; 1945: SC-3 50 cm radar; SGa 10 cm radar; Mk.26 fire control radar; QC series sonar; 1966: AN/SPS-29D radar; AN/SPS-52 radar; Mk.26 MOD 4 fire control radar; AN/SQS-11 sonar
- Armament: 1936: 2 × 5"/51 caliber guns; 2 × 6-pounder guns; 1 × 1-pounder gun; 1941: 3 × 5"/51 caliber guns; 3 × 3"/50 caliber guns; 4 × .50 cal. Browning machine guns; 1 × Y-gun depth charge projector; 2 × depth charge racks; 1943: 2 × 5"/51 caliber guns; 4 × 3"/50 caliber guns; 2 × Oerlikon 20 mm cannons; 1 × Hedgehog anti-submarine mortar; 6 × K-gun depth charge projectors; 2 × depth charge racks; 1945: 2 × 5"/38 caliber guns; 3 × twin Bofors 40 mm autocannon; 4 × Oerlikon 20 mm cannons; 1946: 1 × 5"/38 caliber guns; 1 × twin Bofors 40 mm autocannon; 8 × Oerlikon 20 mm cannons; 1 × Hedgehog anti-submarine mortar; 1966: 1 × 5"/38 caliber Mark 30 Mod 75 gun, Mark 52 Mod 3 director; 1 × Mark 10-1 Hedgehog; 2 × Mk 32 Mod 5 torpedo tubes, 4 × Mark 44 Mod 1 torpedoes; 2 × .50 cal. M2 Browning machine guns; 2 × Mark 13 high altitude parachute flare mortars
- Aircraft carried: 1938: Grumman JF-2; 1941: Curtiss SOC-4
- USCGC Duane (WPG-33)
- U.S. National Register of Historic Places
- Location within Florida Location within the United States
- Location: Monroe County, Florida, USA
- Nearest city: Key Largo
- Coordinates: 25°0′25.98″N 80°20′47.22″W
- NRHP reference No.: 02000494
- Added to NRHP: May 16, 2002

USCGC Duane (WPG-33/WAGC-6/WHEC-33) (earlier known as the USCGC William J. Duane) was a cutter in the United States Coast Guard. Her keel was laid on May 1, 1935, at the Philadelphia Navy Yard, Philadelphia, Pennsylvania. She was launched on June 3, 1936, as a search and rescue and law enforcement vessel.

The Treasury-class Coast Guard cutters (sometimes referred to as the "Secretary" or 327-foot class) were all named for former Secretaries of the Treasury Department. The cutter Duane was named for William J. Duane, who was the third Secretary of the Treasury to serve under President Andrew Jackson.

At the time of the Duane's decommissioning in 1985, she was the oldest active U.S. military vessel; the current oldest, the USCGC Eagle, was also built in 1936 for the German military, but only commissioned into U.S. service in 1946 after being ceded as a war reparation after World War II.

== Ship history ==
After fitting out, she departed the Philadelphia Navy Yard on October 16, 1936, and arrived at Oakland, California on November 24. She was then assigned to temporary duty in Honolulu, and arrived there on December 9, 1936, to participate in the U.S. colonization efforts of the Line Islands in the Pacific. Duane then returned to her permanent homeport of Oakland, arriving on February 25, 1937. For the next two years, she joined the Bering Sea Patrol Force for annual cruises of that area. In mid-1937 her name was shortened to merely Duane. In September 1939 she was assigned to duty with Destroyer Division 18, conducting neutrality patrols along the Grand Banks (these patrols were known as "Grand Banks Patrols"), as ordered by President Franklin Roosevelt. She departed Oakland on September 7, 1939, and arrived at her new homeport of Boston on September 22, 1939. Here she conducted four Grand Banks patrols, from October through December, 1939, completing her final patrol on January 12, 1940.

=== World War II ===
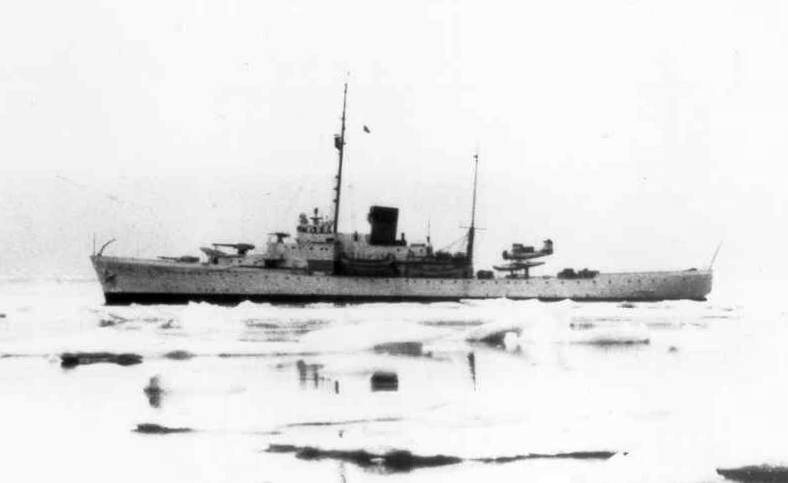
USCGC Duane (WPG-33) off Greenland in 1940

Duane was then assigned to weather patrols in the mid-Atlantic, and also carried out a survey of the western coast of Greenland in mid-1940. In late 1940 she was fitted with additional armaments, receiving anti-aircraft and anti-submarine weapons. On 14 June 1941 she rescued 46 survivors from the British tanker Tresillian, which had been sunk by U-77. She was assigned to permanent duty with the U.S. Navy on 11 September 1941, and was designated WPG-33. On 1 April 1942 Duane was reassigned from weather patrols to convoy escort duty during the battle of the Atlantic.

Convoy	Escort Group	Dates	Notes
SC 81		5 May 1942	Iceland shuttle
SC 83		17 May 1942	Iceland shuttle
ON 98		27–30 May 1942	Iceland shuttle
ON 102		14–17 June 1942	Iceland shuttle
SC 89		29 June 1942	Iceland shuttle
ON 112		14–17 July 1942	Iceland shuttle
SC 91		19 July 1942	Iceland shuttle
ON 116		25–29 July 1942	Iceland shuttle
ON 117		31 July-3 Aug 1942	Iceland shuttle
ON 120		9-14 Aug 1942	Iceland shuttle
SC 95		14 Aug 1942	Iceland shuttle
SC 99		12 Sept 1942	Iceland shuttle
ON 136		5-9 Oct 1942	Iceland shuttle
SC 103		10 Oct 1942	Iceland shuttle
ON 140		19-24 Oct 1942	Iceland shuttle
SC 105		25-26 Oct 1942	Iceland shuttle
ON 144		8-15 Nov 1942	Iceland shuttle
ON 148		25-27 Nov 1942	Iceland shuttle
HX 216		28 Nov-1 Dec 1942	Iceland shuttle
SC 110		1-2 Dec 1942	Iceland shuttle
ON 156		25-30 Dec 1942	Iceland shuttle
SC 114			Iceland shuttle
SC 116		16-24 Jan 1943	Iceland shuttle
ON 163		26 Jan-3 Feb 1943	Iceland shuttle
HX 233	MOEF group A-3	12–20 April 1943	from Newfoundland to Northern Ireland

Duane was converted to a combined operations-communications headquarters ship in 1944. Upon completion, she was to have been taken over by the Navy and assigned the hull number AGC-6. However, this plan was dropped and she was retained for Coast Guard service (her designation then became WAGC-6). Duane was attached to the Eighth Amphibious Force in the Mediterranean Sea, and took part in "Operation Dragoon", the invasion of southern France, in August 1944. She remained in the Mediterranean until July 1945, when she returned to the United States and reverted to her previous designation WPG-33.

=== Post-war ===
The ocean-weather station program was permanently established by multi-national agreement soon after the end of World War II. The Coast Guard was then assigned the duty of manning those stations for which the U.S. accepted responsibility. As the 327s completed conversion to ocean station vessels, each immediately deployed to their new stations. For most of the next twenty years, Duane and her sisters, except Taney which was stationed in the Pacific, alternated duty between weather stations "Charlie" (850 miles northeast of St. John's, Newfoundland), "Bravo" (250 miles northeast of Cape St. Charles, Labrador); "Delta" (located 650 miles southeast of Argentia, Newfoundland); and "Echo" (850 miles east northeast of Bermuda). Sometime later these became known simply as "ocean stations." Although the crew probably considered these patrols boring, they were important to the continued growth and safety of international over-water commercial air flights. On 1 May 1965 all the vessels in her class were re-classified as high endurance cutters and she was redesignated WHEC-33.

=== Vietnam and after ===
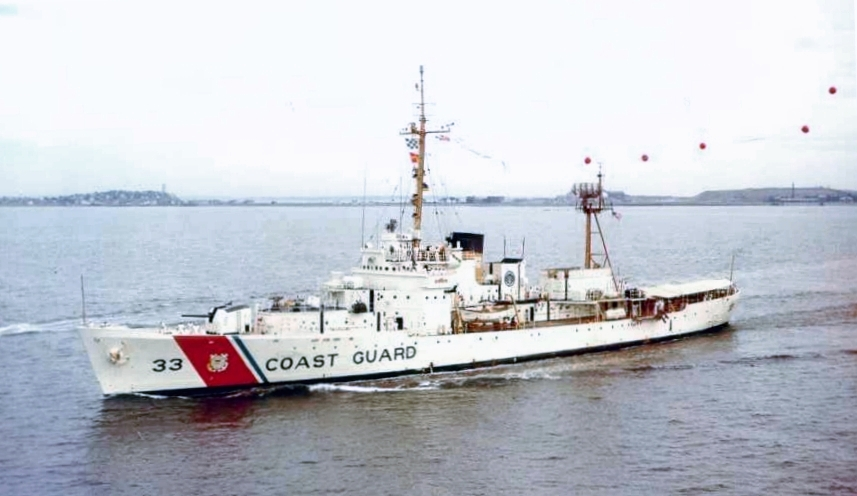
USCGC Duane (WHEC-33) returning from Vietnam in 1968

On 4 December 1967 Duane was assigned to Coast Guard Squadron Three located off the coast of Vietnam, where she served as the flagship for Coast Guard squadron. Duane permanently departed Vietnamese waters on July 28, 1968. Duane then again returned to ocean station duty but this task was rapidly becoming obsolete. The stations were decommissioned in the early 1970s, having been overtaken by electronic aids to navigation such as LORAN. The mid-1970s were a period of transition for the Coast Guard with the passage of the Fisheries Conservation and Management Act and the nation's shift towards increased interdiction of narcotics smugglers. These operations called for off-shore patrols of up to three weeks.

=== Decommissioning and disposal ===
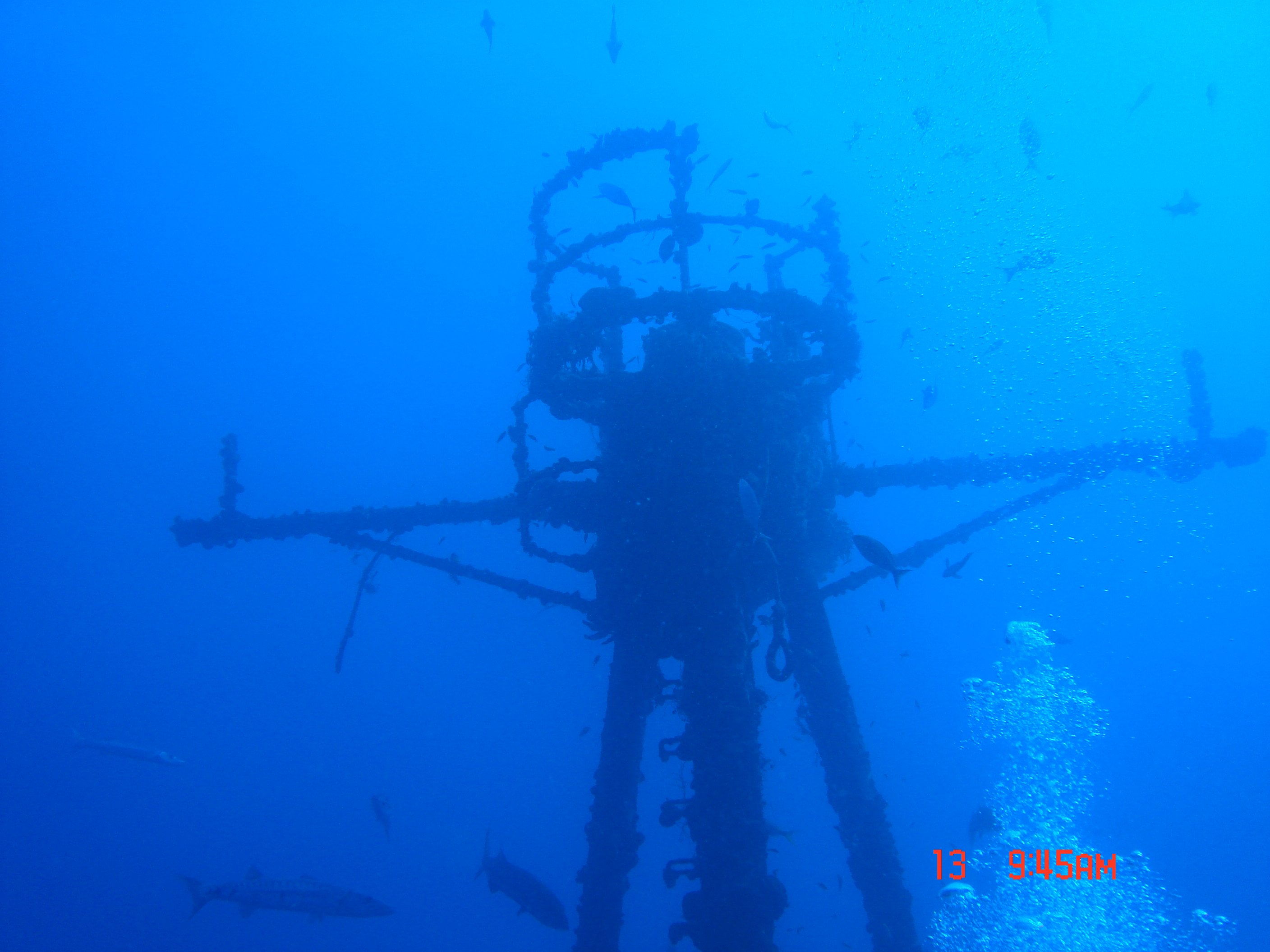
The crow's nest of the Duane in March 2007

Duane left Coast Guard service and was decommissioned on August 1, 1985, as the oldest active U.S. military vessel and was laid up in Boston for the next two years.

Duane is now a historic shipwreck near Key Largo, Florida, United States. The cutter was deliberately sunk on November 27, 1987, to create an artificial reef. It is located a mile south of Molasses Reef. On May 16, 2002, it was added to the U.S. National Register of Historic Places.

== Decorations ==
The following decorations were awarded to Duane during her service life:

- Presidential Unit Citation
- China Service Medal
- American Campaign Medal
- American Defense Service Medal
- European-African-Middle Eastern Campaign Medal with four battle stars
- Asiatic-Pacific Campaign Medal with four battle stars
- World War II Victory Medal
- Navy Occupation Service Medal
- National Defense Service Medal with one battle star
- Vietnam Service Medal with two battle stars
- Philippine Presidential Unit Citation
- Philippine Liberation Ribbon with two battle stars
- Republic of Vietnam Campaign Medal
- Republic of Vietnam Gallantry Cross with Palm and Frame Unit Citation

== In media ==
- "People Who Make a Difference," a 1991 episode of the PBS television series Return to the Sea, includes footage of a dive on the wreck of Duane.

Preceded by USCGC Campbell (WPG-32)	United States Coast Guard "Queen of the Fleet"; 1982-1985	Succeeded by USCGC Ingham (WHEC-35)
