= Çırak =

Çırak (Turkish "apprentice") may refer to:

- Çırak (film), 2014 film by Tayfun Belet
- tr:Çırak (film), 2016 film directed by Emre Konuk
- Çırak The Apprentice, hosted by Tuncay Özihan
- Zehra Çırak (1960) German writer

== See also ==
- Cirák, village in Hungary
