= USCGC Ingham (WHEC-35) =

United States Coast Guard Cutter

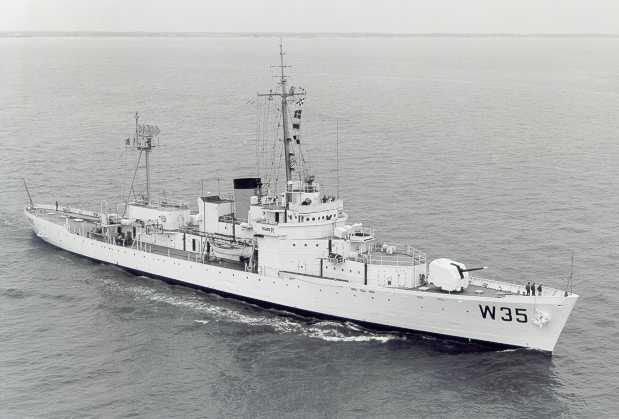
- USCGC Ingham (WHEC-35)

History

United States
- Name: Samuel D. Ingham; Ingham (May 1937)
- Namesake: Samuel D. Ingham
- Awarded: 30 January 1934
- Builder: Philadelphia Naval Shipyard
- Laid down: 1 May 1935
- Launched: 3 June 1936
- Sponsored by: Katharine Brush
- Commissioned: 12 September 1936
- Decommissioned: 27 May 1988
- Reclassified: WPG-35 (1 July 1941); WAGC-35 (24 July 1944); WHEC-35 (1 May 1965)
- Motto: Never too old to serve
- Status: Museum ship

General characteristics
- Displacement: 2,700 long tons (2,700 t)
- Length: 327 ft (100 m)
- Beam: 41 ft (12 m)
- Installed power: 2 × Babcock & Wilcox boilers; 6,200 hp (4,600 kW)
- Propulsion: 2 × Westinghouse double reduction geared steam turbine engines; 2 × Propellers
- Speed: 21 kn (39 km/h; 24 mph)
- Range: 8,270 nmi (15,320 km; 9,520 mi)
- Complement: (1937) 12 officers, 4 warrants, 107 enlisted; (1941) 16 officers, 5 warrants, 202 enlisted; (1966) 10 officers, 3 warrants, 134 enlisted
- Armament: Depending on the time period: 1 to 4 × 5" (127 mm)/38 caliber Mk.30; 2 × 5" (127 mm)/51 caliber; 2 × 6-pounder saluting guns; varying numbers of .50 caliber (12.7 mm) machine guns
- Aircraft carried: originally 1 Grumman Duck seaplane, later removed
- USCGC Ingham
- U.S. National Register of Historic Places
- U.S. National Historic Landmark
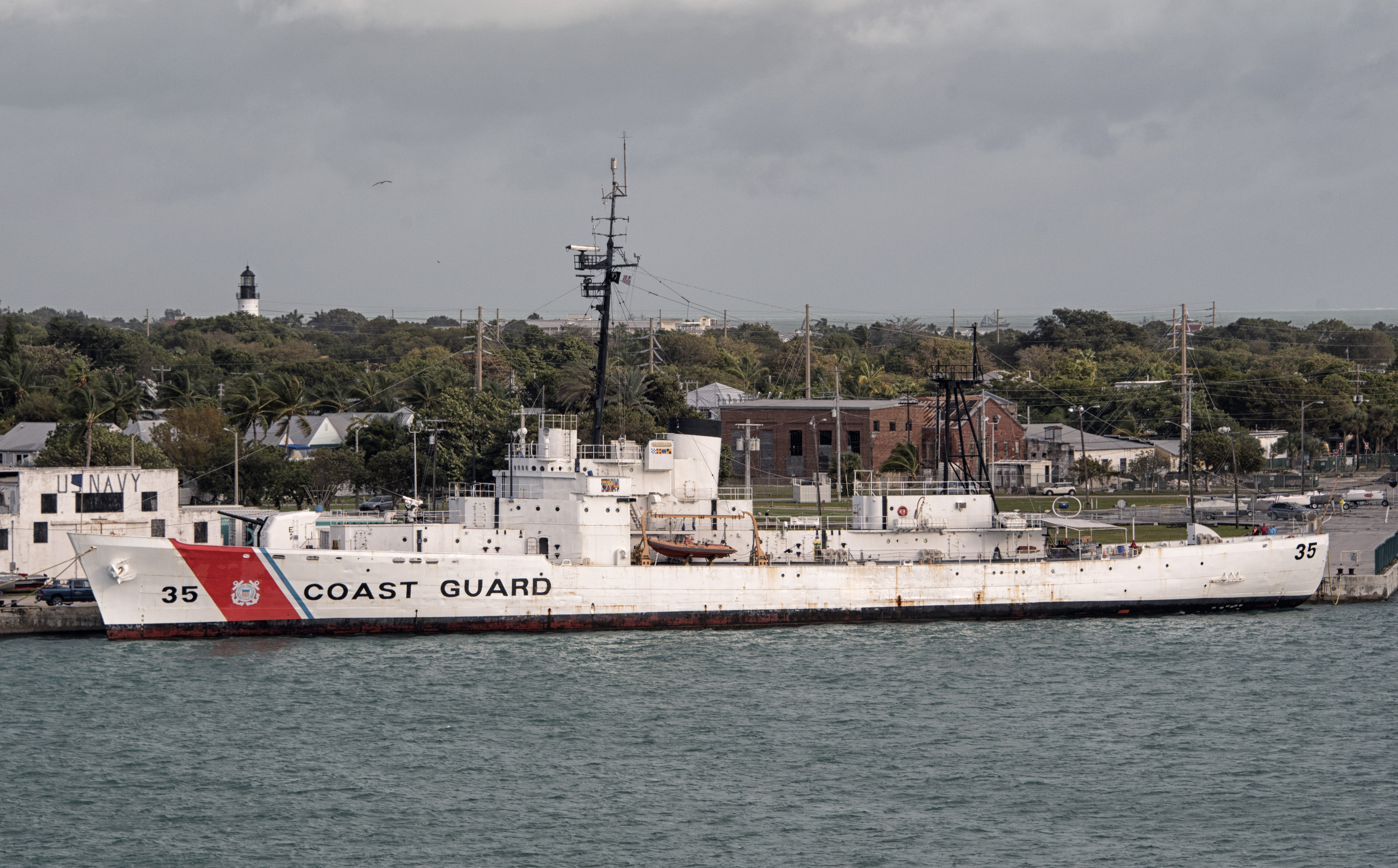
- Ingham preserved in Key West.

- Location within Florida
- Location: Key West, Florida
- Coordinates: 24°33′08.1″N 81°48′27.7″W
- Built: 1935
- Architect: US Coast Guard; Philadelphia Navy Yard
- NRHP reference No.: 92001879

Significant dates
- Added to NRHP: 27 April 1992
- Designated NHL: 27 April 1992

USCGC Ingham (WPG/WAGC/WHEC-35) is one of only two preserved Treasury-class United States Coast Guard Cutters. Originally Samuel D. Ingham, she was the fourth cutter to be named for Treasury Secretary Samuel D. Ingham. She was the most decorated vessel in the Coast Guard fleet and was the only cutter to ever be awarded two Presidential Unit Citations.

== History 1934–1988 ==
Ingham was built at the Philadelphia Navy Yard. The Treasury Department awarded her contract on 30 January 1934. Her keel was laid on 1 May 1935, and she was launched on 3 June 1936, along with her sisters USCGC William J. Duane (WPG-33), USCGC Taney (WHEC-37) and the USCGC George W. Campbell (WPG-32). Ingham was christened by Ms. Katherine Ingham Brush on that date and the new cutter was formally commissioned on 12 September 1936.

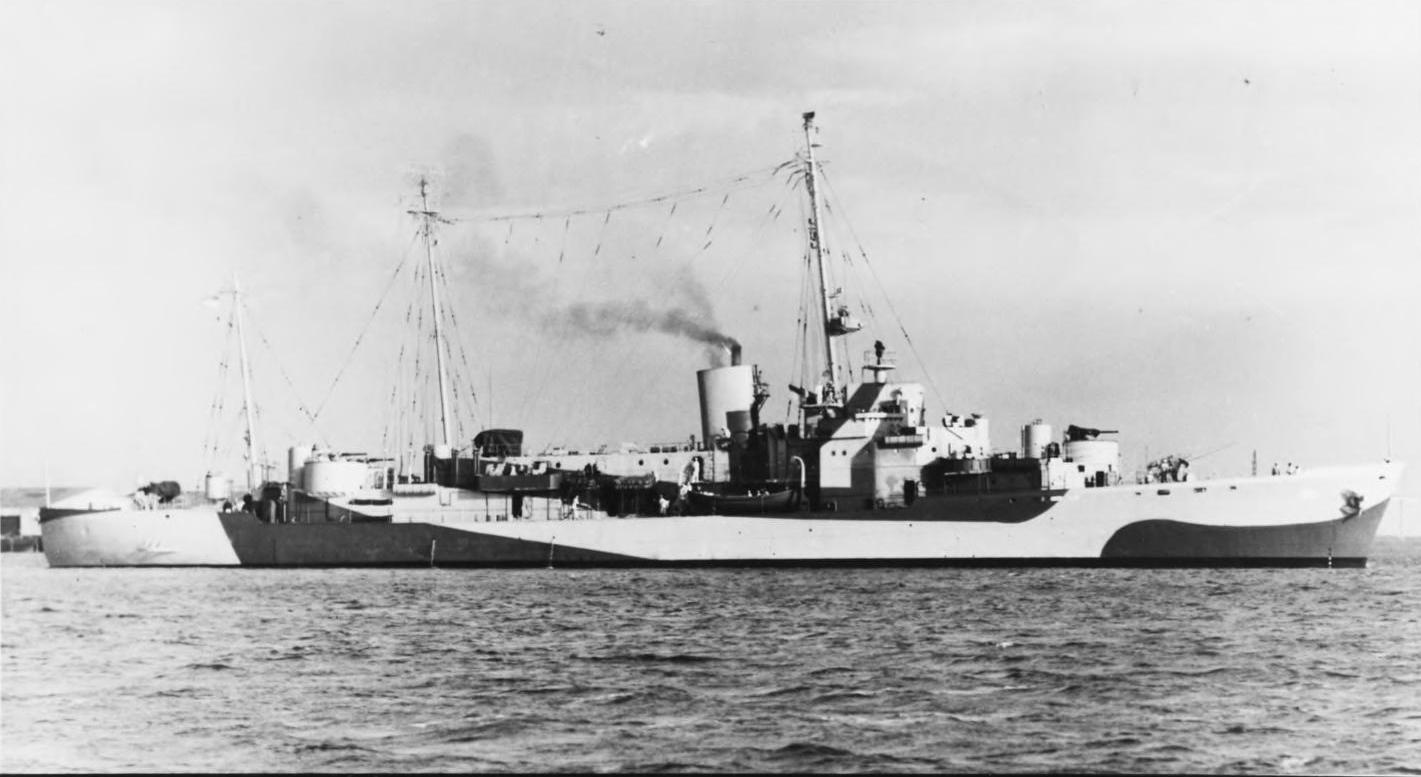
Ingham at U.S. Navy Yard, S.C., 11 Oct 1944

Ingham served with distinction during World War II on convoy duty. Protecting ships ferrying vital supplies to Britain, Ingham battled stormy weather, German U-boats, and enemy aircraft. On 15 December 1942, during one crossing, Ingham engaged and sank the enemy submarine U-626. After 1944, Ingham served as an amphibious flagship and she would later take part in three campaigns in the Pacific Theater. Ingham was the last active warship in the US fleet with a U-Boat kill.

=== Convoys escorted ===
Convoy	Escort Group	Dates	Notes
HX 164		10–19 Dec 1941	from Newfoundland to Iceland
ON 49		27 Dec 1941-5 Jan 1942	from Iceland to Newfoundland
HX 171		22–30 Jan 1942	from Newfoundland to Iceland
ON 63		7–13 Feb 1942	from Iceland to Newfoundland
HX 177	MOEF group A2	1–8 March 1942	from Newfoundland to Northern Ireland
ON 77	MOEF group A2	18–26 March 1942	from Northern Ireland to Newfoundland
HX 190	MOEF group A3	20–27 May 1942	from Newfoundland to Northern Ireland
ON 102	MOEF group A3	10–17 June 1942	from Northern Ireland to Iceland
ON 116		25–29 July 1942	Iceland shuttle
SC 93		29 July 1942	Iceland shuttle
ON 117		31 July-3 Aug 1942	Iceland shuttle
ON 124		24–27 Aug 1942	Iceland shuttle
SC 97		29 Aug-1 Sep 1942	Iceland shuttle
ON 132		21–24 Sep 1942	Iceland shuttle
SC 101		28–30 Sep 1942	Iceland shuttle
ON 136		5–9 Oct 1942	Iceland shuttle
SC 103		10 Oct 1942	Iceland shuttle
Convoy SC 107		5–7 Nov 1942	Iceland shuttle
ON 144		8–15 Nov 1942	Iceland shuttle
ON 152		11–15 Dec 1942	Iceland shuttle
SC 112		16–21 Dec 1942	Iceland shuttle
ON 160		14–21 Jan 1943	Iceland shuttle
HX 223		23–27 Jan 1943	Iceland shuttle
ON 175		4 Feb 1943	Iceland shuttle
Convoy SC 118		5–9 Feb 1943	Iceland shuttle
Convoy SC 121		9–11 March 1943	Iceland shuttle
Convoys HX 229/SC 122		19–21 March 1943	Iceland shuttle

=== Post-war service ===
In August 1966, Ingham rescued lone sailor William Willis off the US eastern seabord, landing him at the Argentia Coast Guard station.

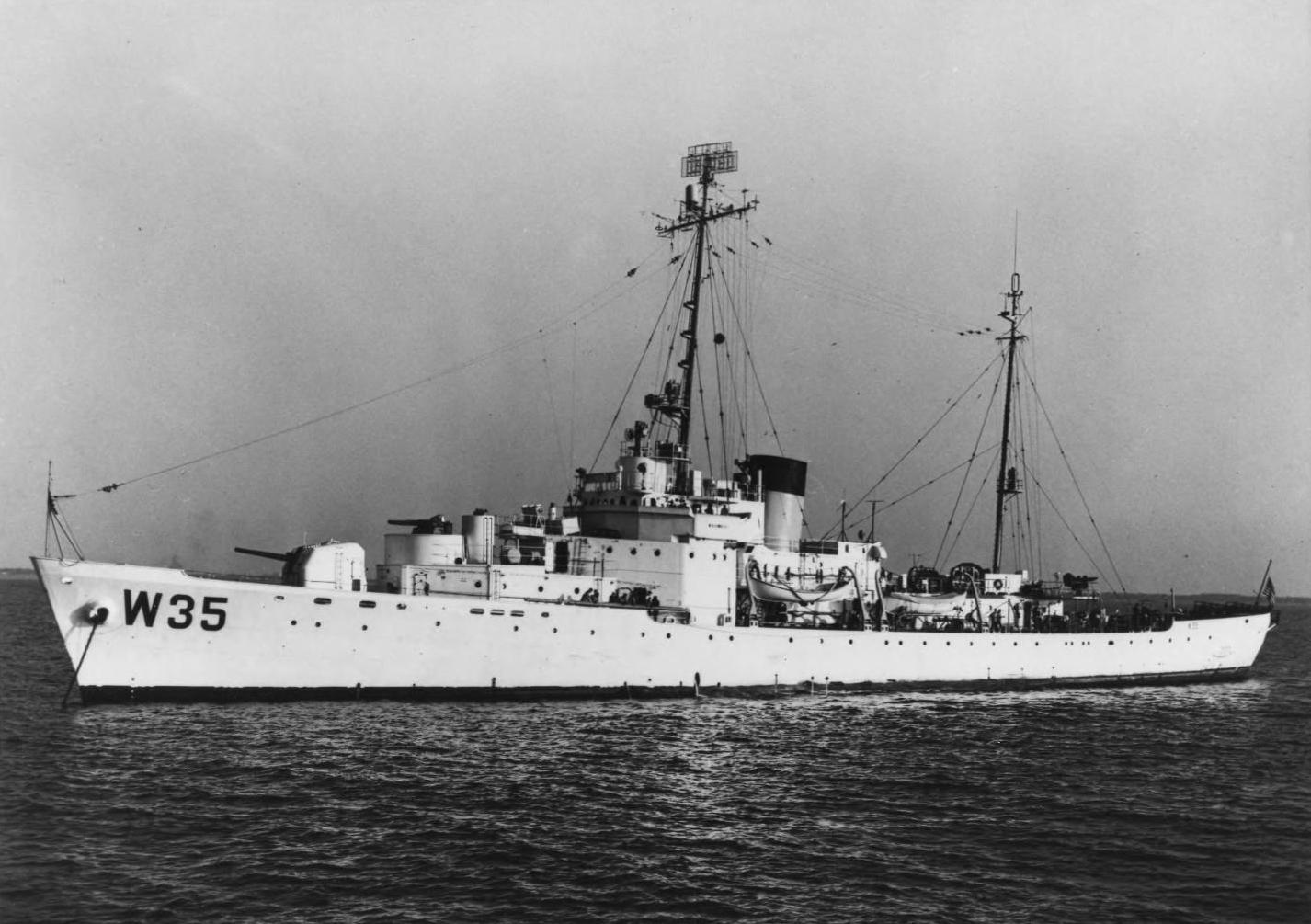
Ingham in 1953

Ingham earned two Presidential Unit Citations for her service in Operation SEA LORDS and Operation SWIFT RAIDER during the Vietnam War on a deployment from 3 August 1968 to 28 February 1969.

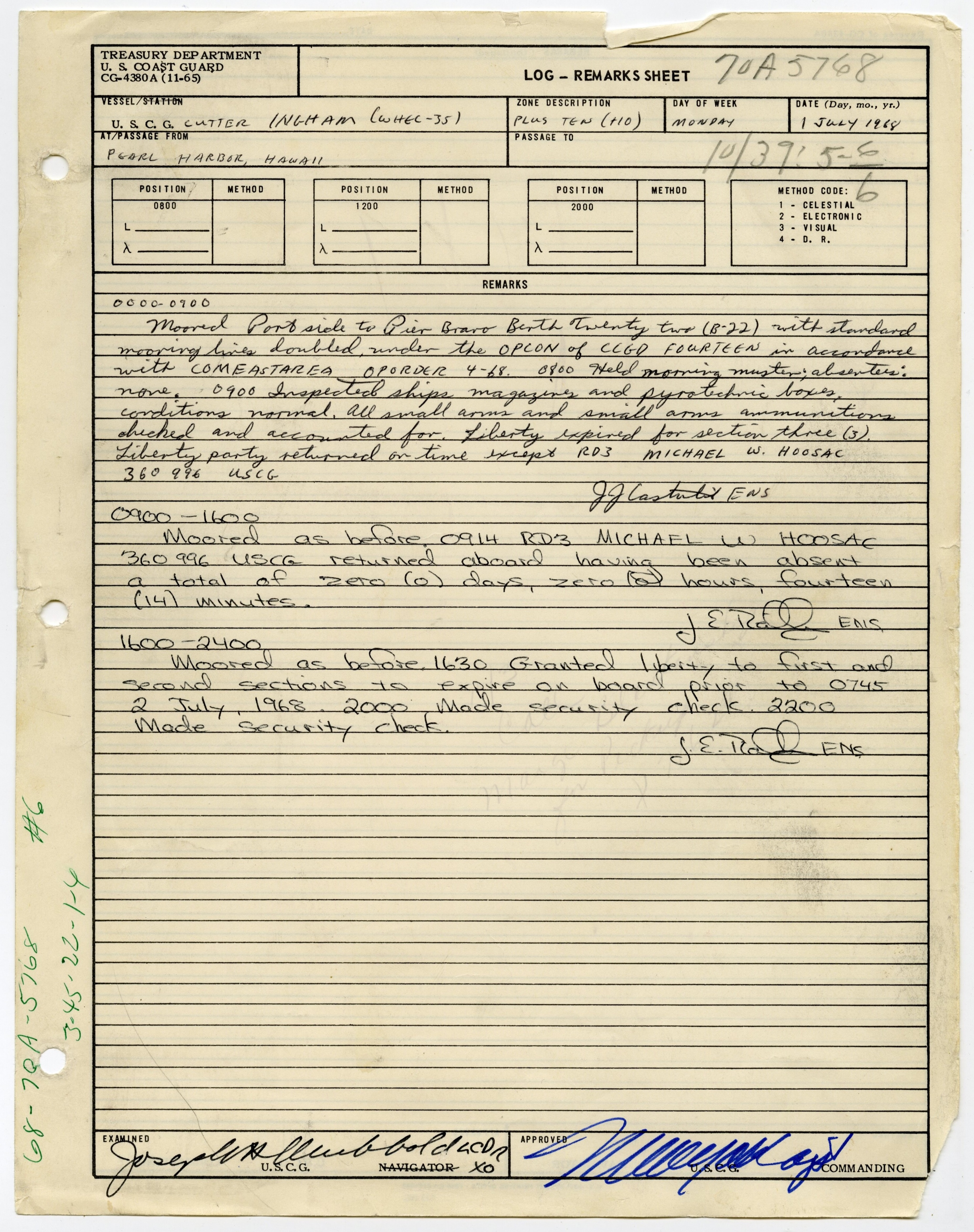
USCGC Ingham Logbook July 1968

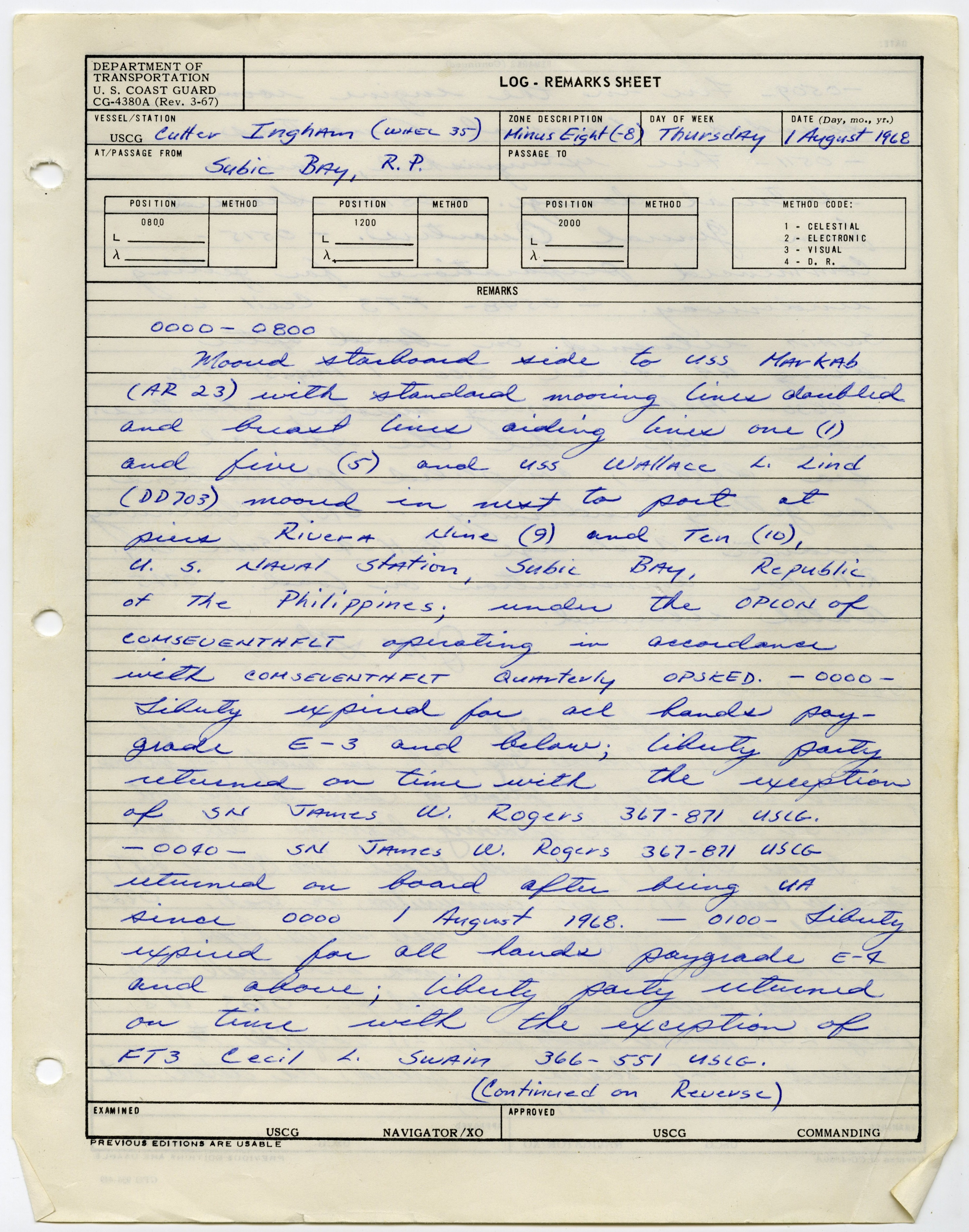
USCG Ingham Logbook August 1968

On completion of her deployment to Vietnam, Ingham returned to regular Coast Guard duties, serving until 1988, when she was decommissioned. At that time, Ingham was the second oldest commissioned U.S. warship afloat, second only to USS Constitution in Boston, Massachusetts.

== Museum Ship and Memorial ==
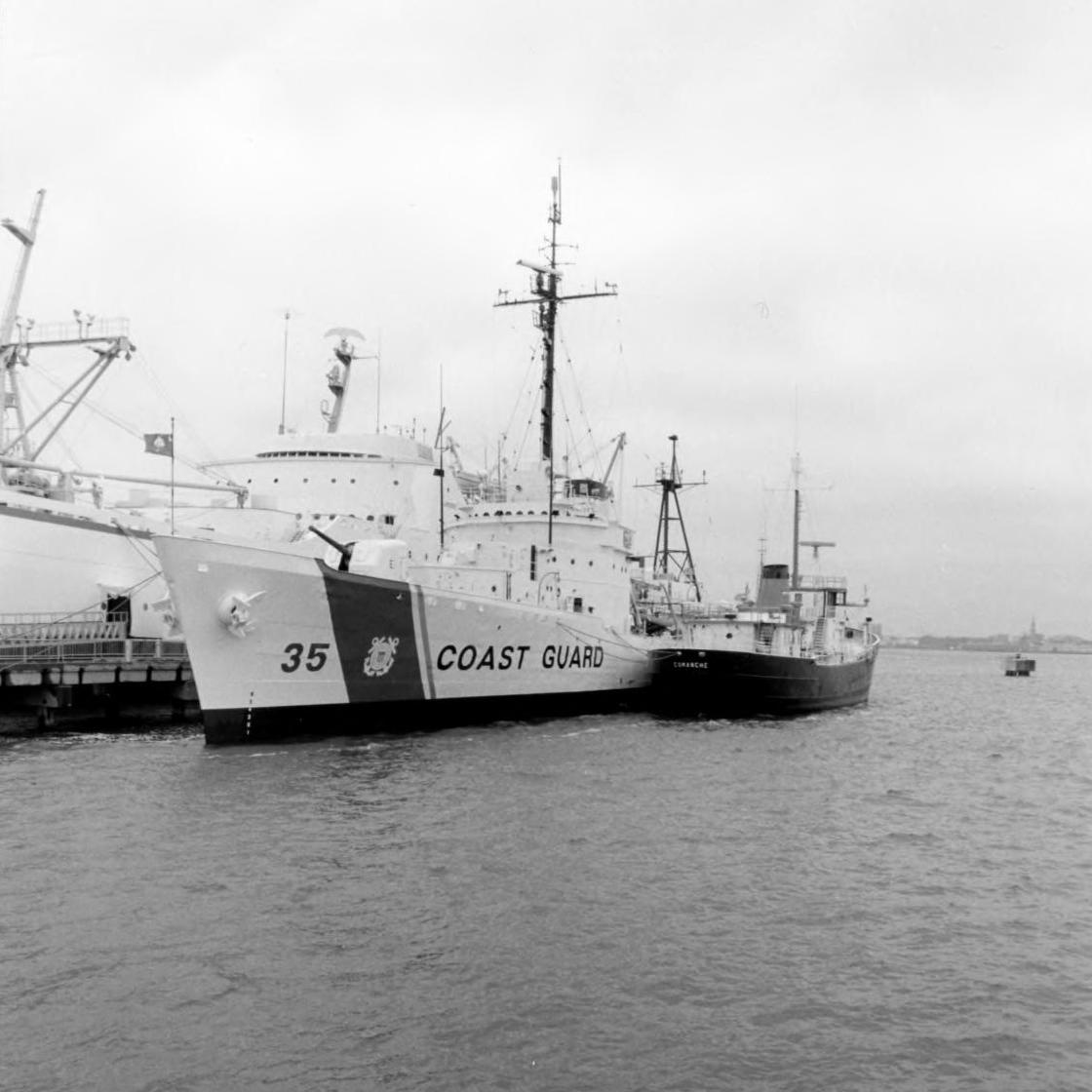
Ingham at Patriots Point in 1990

Acquired by Patriot's Point (located near Charleston, South Carolina) in 1989, Ingham was displayed along with the aircraft carrier Yorktown, the destroyer Laffey, and the submarine Clamagore until 20 August 2009.

On 20 August 2009 Ingham was towed to the Coast Guard piers in North Charleston, South Carolina for minor repairs and to await dry docking. She underwent a short dry docking period at Detyen's Shipyard in North Charleston and was then towed to Key West, Florida arriving there on 24 November 2009. She is now a member of Key West Maritime Memorial Museum.

The Commandant of the Coast Guard has declared Ingham the National Memorial to Coast Guardsmen Killed in Action in World War II and Vietnam. These 912 casualties are identified on a memorial plaque on Ingham's quarterdeck. Ingham was declared a National Historic Landmark in 1992.

== Awards ==
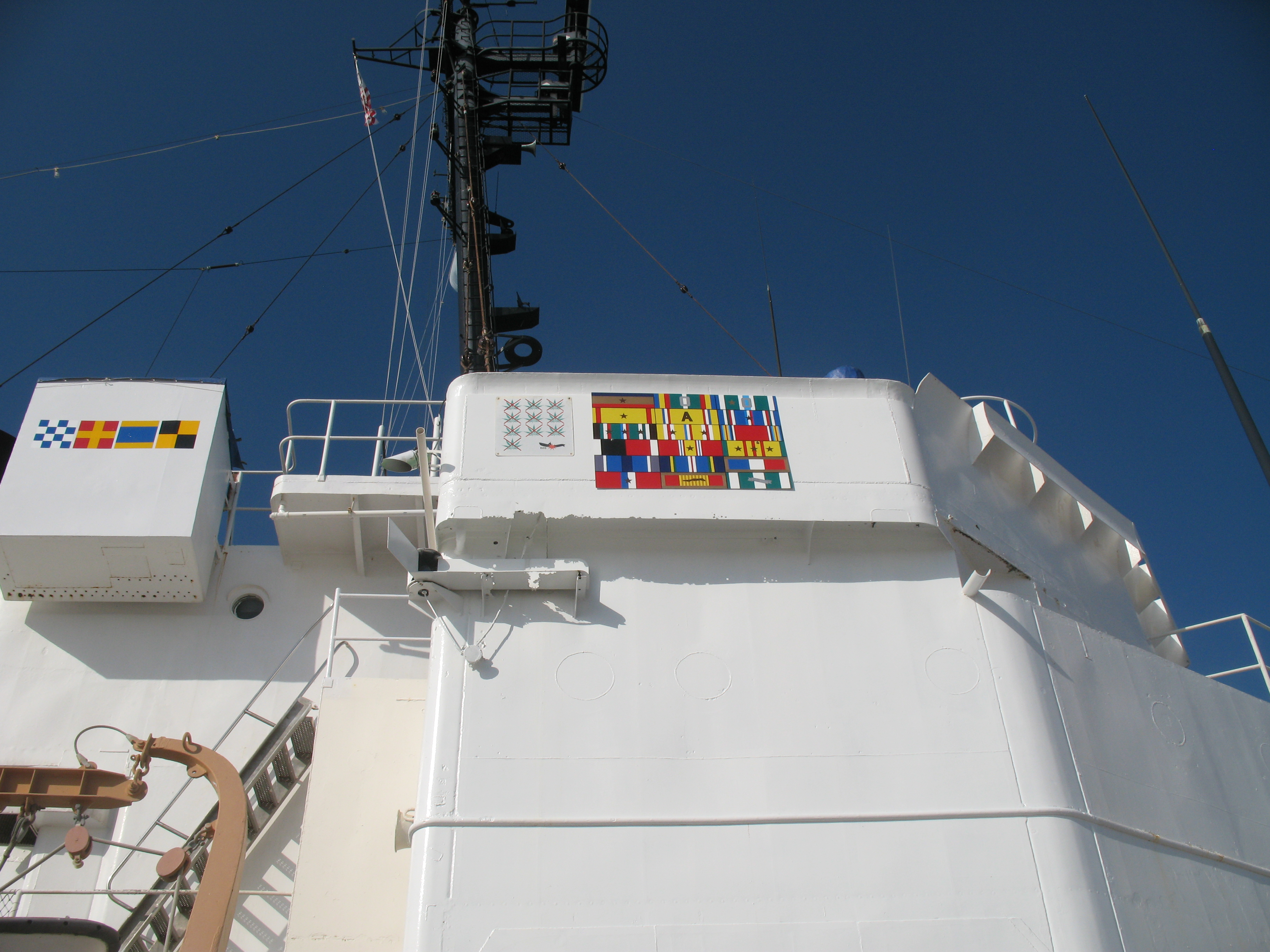
Ribbons and Medals painted on in January 2010.

- Presidential Unit Citation – 2 awards
- Coast Guard Unit Commendation - 2 awards with "O" device
- Coast Guard Meritorious Unit Commendation – 2 awards
- Coast Guard E Ribbon – 3 awards
- China Service Medal
- American Defense Service Medal with "A" device
- American Campaign Medal with one battle star
- European-African-Middle Eastern Campaign Medal with three battle stars
- Asiatic-Pacific Campaign Medal with three battle stars
- World War II Victory Medal
- Navy Occupation Service Medal
- National Defense Service Medal with star
- Vietnam Service Medal with three campaign stars
- Humanitarian Service Medal
- Coast Guard Special Operations Service Ribbon
- Philippine Presidential Unit Citation
- Republic of Vietnam Gallantry Cross Unit Citation
- Philippine Liberation Ribbon with one star
- Republic of Vietnam Campaign Medal

== Gallery ==
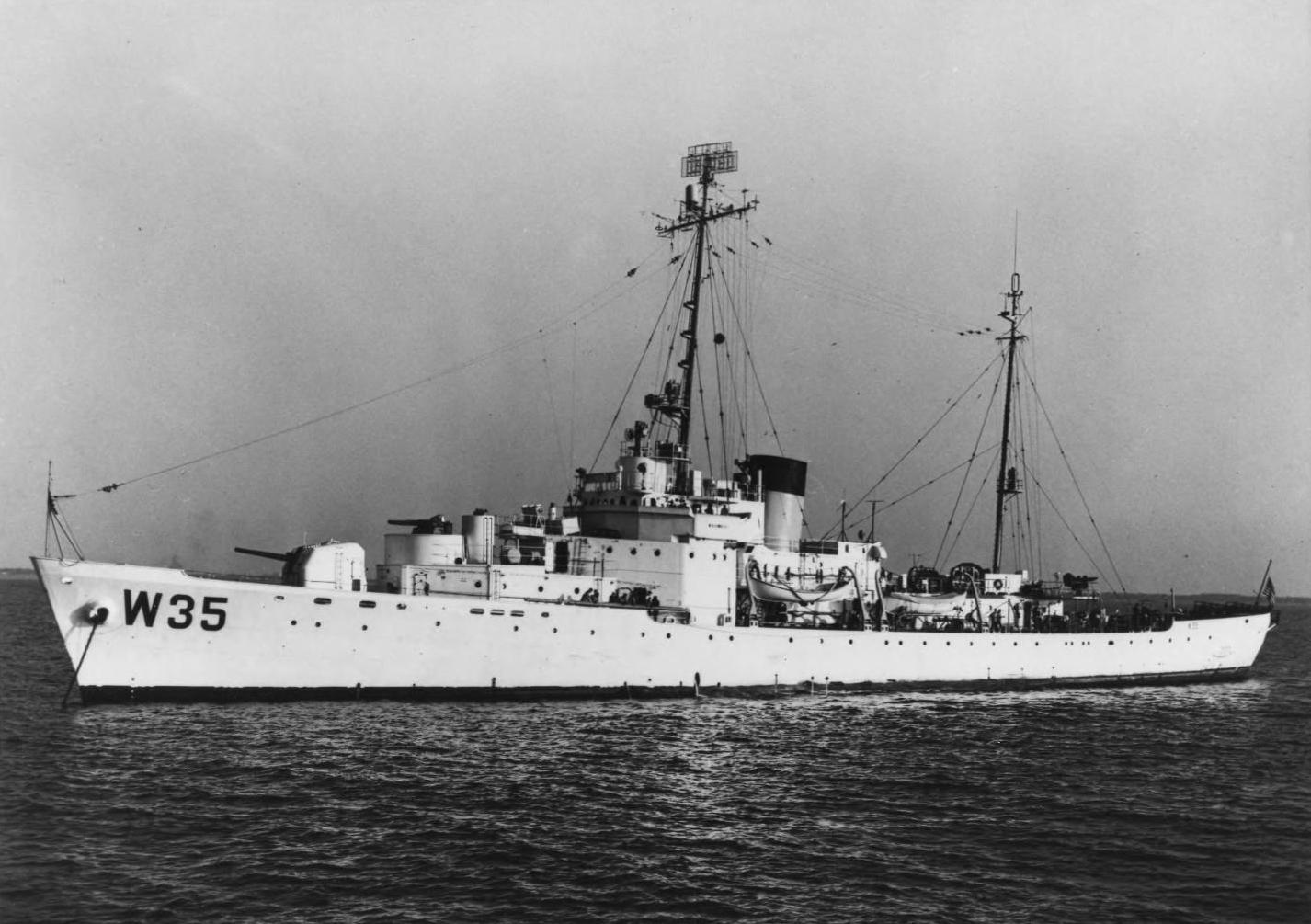
Ingham in 1953

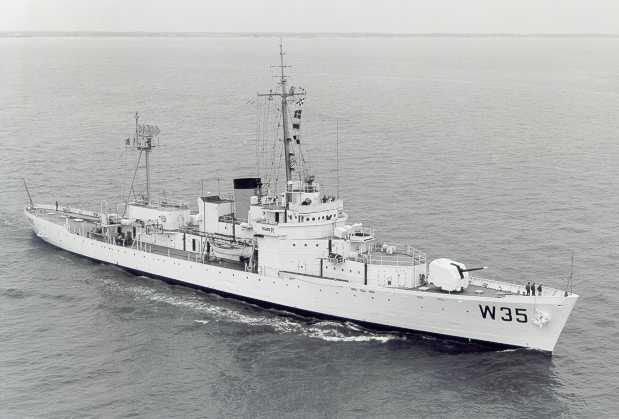
The Ingham ca. 1965

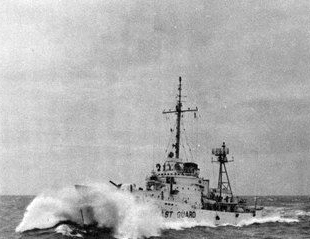
USCGC Ingham (WHEC-35) off Vietnam ca. 1968

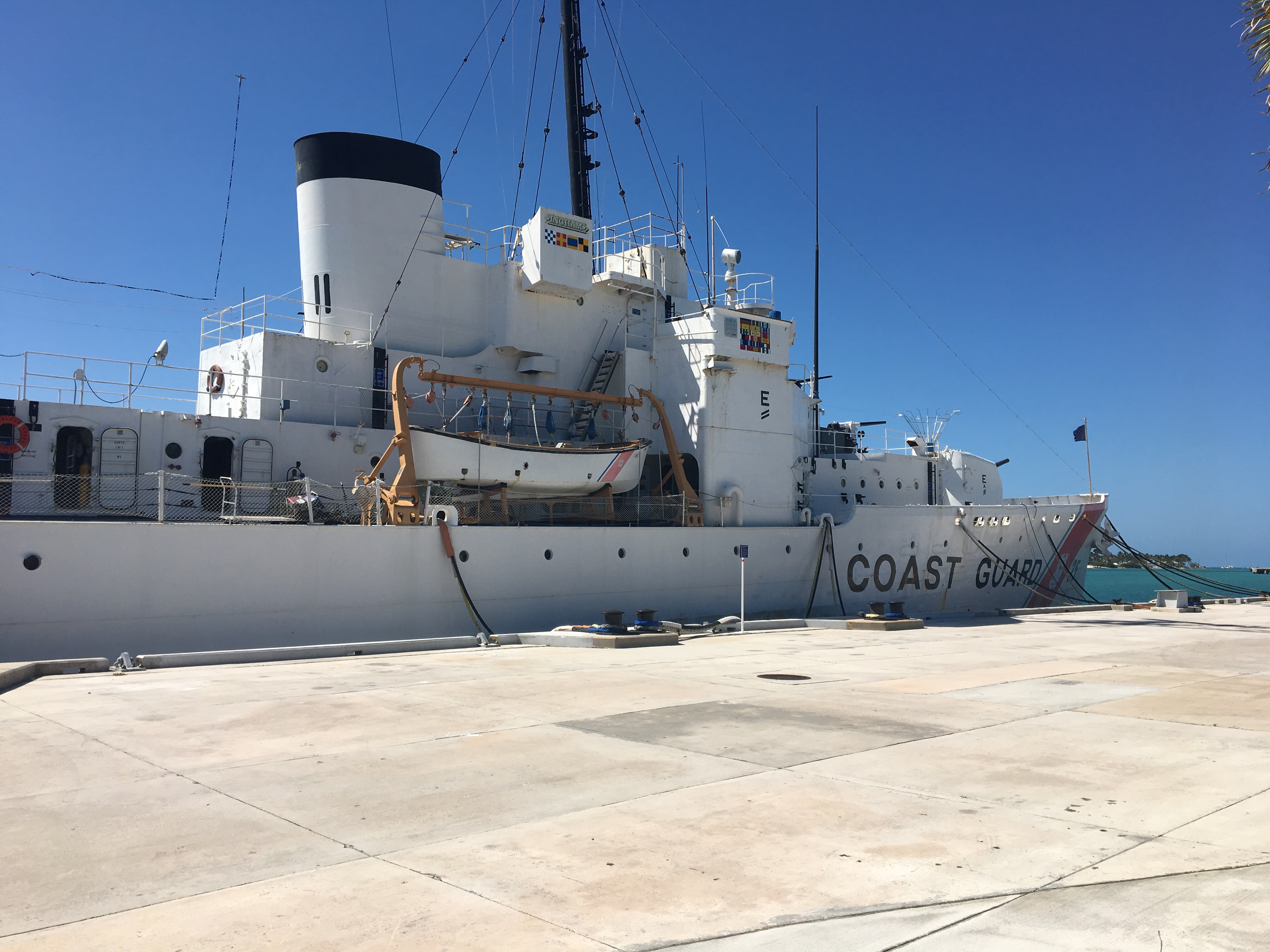
Ingham in Key West in 2019

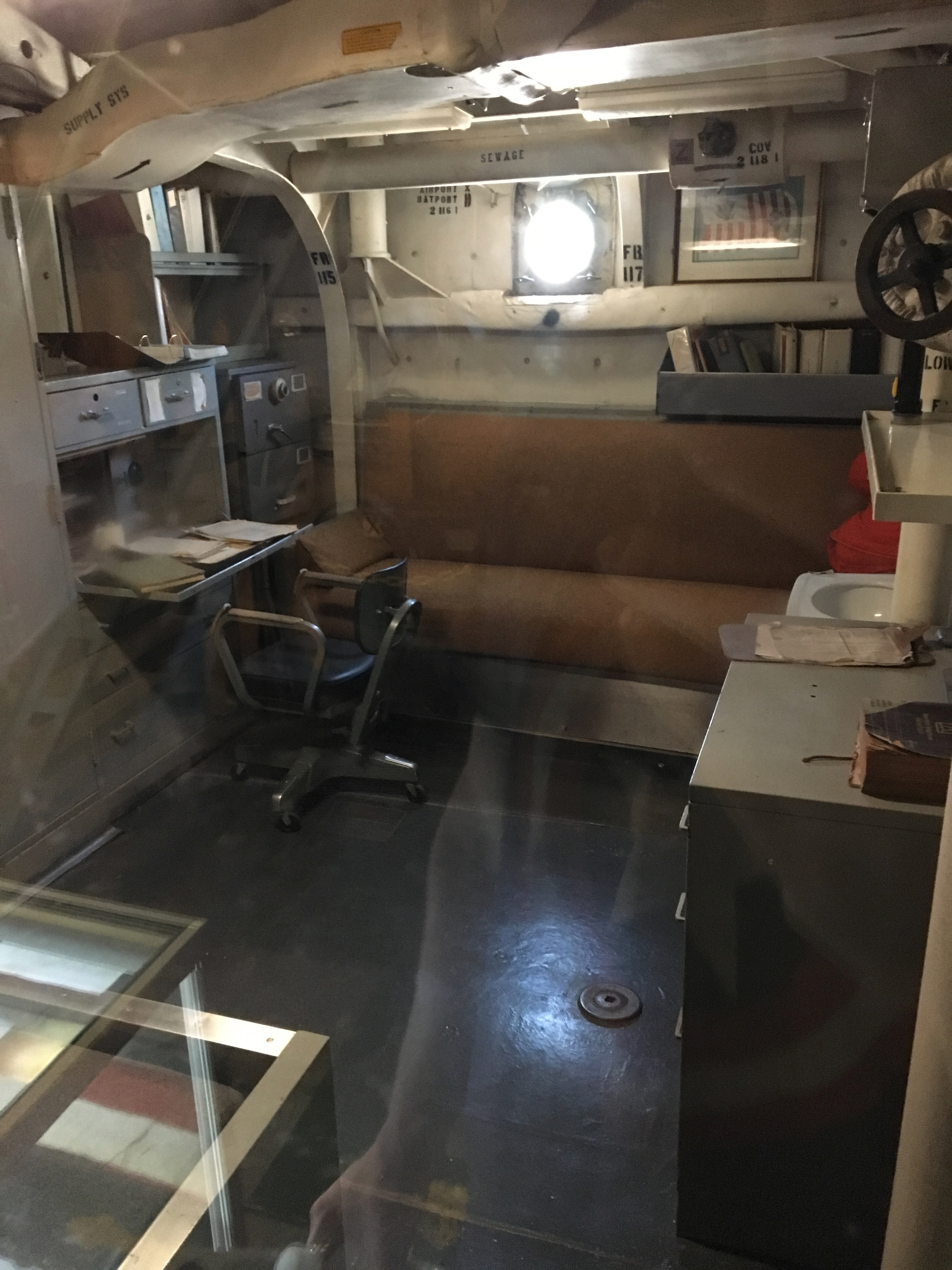
Executive Officer's stateroom

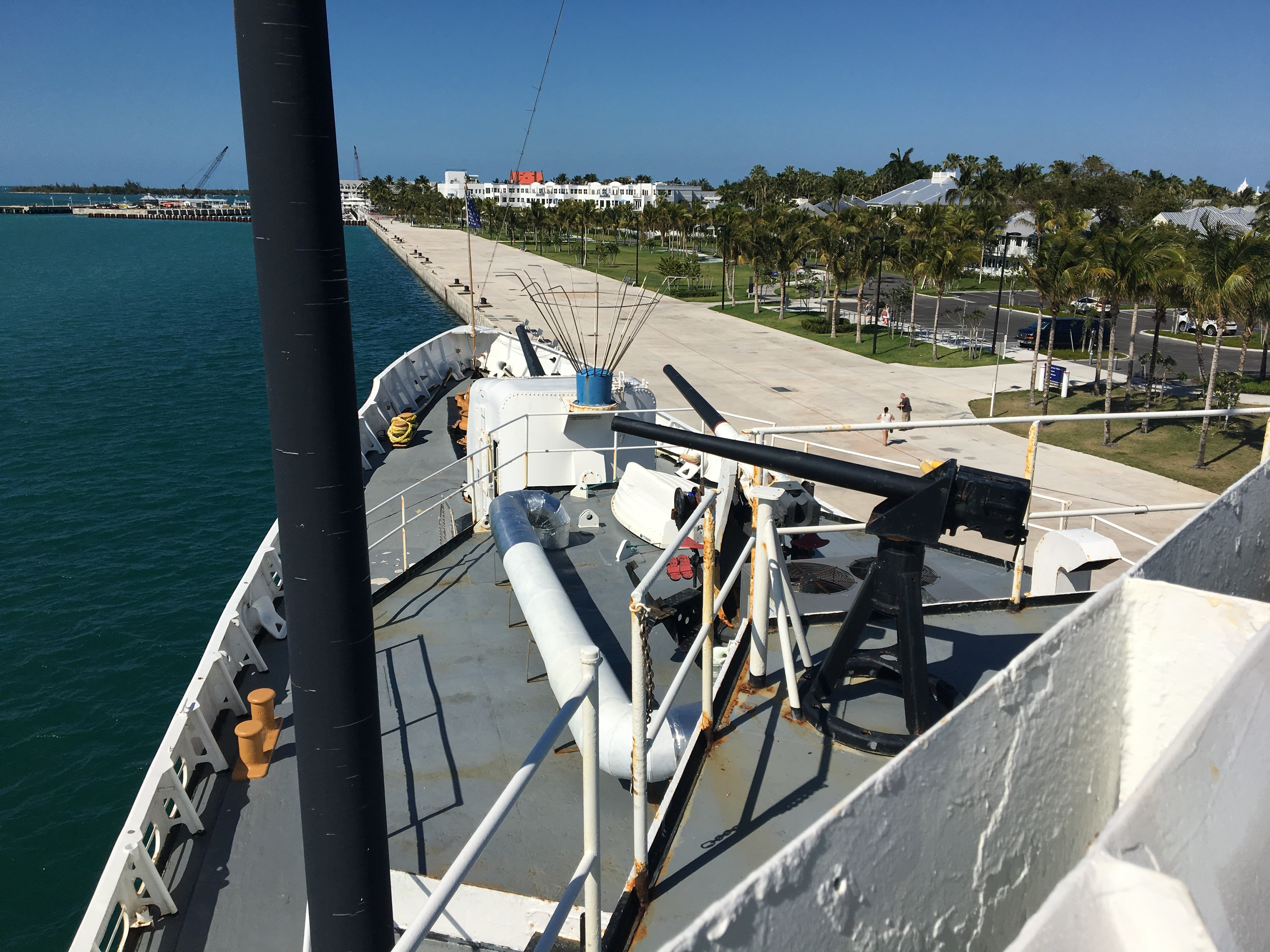
View of the bow of the Ingham with a 5"/38 caliber gun, and a 6-pounder saluting gun

Preceded by USCGC Duane (WPG-33)	United States Coast Guard "Queen of the Fleet"; 1985-1988	Succeeded by USCGC Fir (WLM-212)
