= Çekirdek ve Makara =

- Directed by: Tayfun Belet
- Produced by: Tayfun Belet
- Cinematography: Tayfun Belet
- Edited by: Tayfun Belet
- Music by: Erkin Koray, Ömer Oral
- Distributed by: Tabu Film Production
- Release date: January 1, 2015
- Running time: 21 minutes 13 seconds
- Country: Turkey
- Language: Turkish

Çekirdek ve Makara is a documentary film by Tayfun Belet made in 2015. The international name is The Reel and the Sunflower Seeds.

== Synopsis ==
The documentary tries to capture the soul of Turkey's summer cinema concept. It shows the struggles and rewards of running one of the few old fashioned cinema businesses in Turkey. It also has glimpses of Turkey's classic cinema films and actors/actresses.

== Awards ==
- 7. TRT Documentary Awards, International Professional Category, Finalist. 2015
