= USCGC Alexander Hamilton =

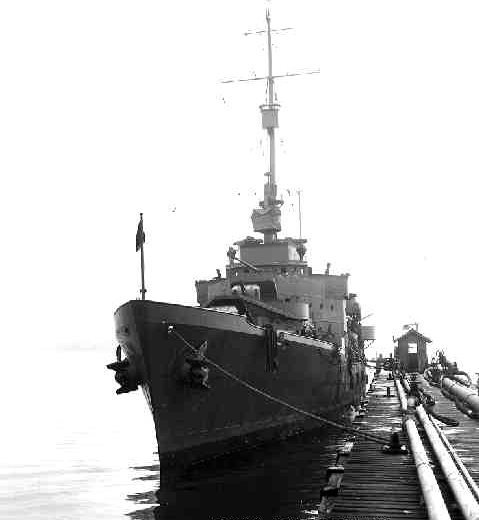
- USCGC Alexander Hamilton in 1941

History

United States
- Namesake: Alexander Hamilton
- Operator: United States Coast Guard
- Builder: New York Navy Yard
- Laid down: September 11, 1935
- Launched: January 6, 1937
- Commissioned: March 4, 1937
- Stricken: January 29, 1942
- Fate: Torpedoed and sunk at 64.36°N 23.04°W on 29 January 1942

General characteristics
- Class & type: Treasury-class cutter
- Displacement: 2,350 tons
- Length: 327 ft (100 m)
- Beam: 41 ft (12 m)
- Draft: 12 ft 6 in (3.81 m)
- Propulsion: 2 Babcock & Wilcox sectional express boilers and 2 Westinghouse double reduction geared steam turbine engines; 5,250 shp (3,910 kW)
- Speed: 19.5 knots (36.1 km/h; 22.4 mph) max
- Range: 7,000 nautical miles (13,000 km)
- Complement: 1937: 12 officers, 4 warrants, 107 ratings; 1941: 16 officers, 5 warrants, 200 ratings
- Armament: 1-5"/51 caliber gun (single mount); 3-3 in (76 mm) (single mounts); 2 depth charge racks; 1 "Y" gun depth charge projector
- Aircraft carried: 1938: JF-2 Grumman, V-143

USCGC Alexander Hamilton (WPG-34) was a Treasury-class cutter. She was named after Founding Father and the first U.S. Secretary of the Treasury, Alexander Hamilton. Sunk after an attack by a German U-boat in January 1942, the Hamilton was the U.S. Coast Guard's first loss of World War II.

== Design ==
The design of the Alexander Hamilton was based on the U.S. Navy's Erie class of gunboats. This Treasury class of U.S. Coast Guard cutters was sometimes referred to as the Secretary class.

== History ==
The Alexander Hamilton was built at the New York Navy Yard for the U.S. Coast Guard. Her keel was laid on September 11, 1935 and she was launched on January 6, 1937. The U.S. Coast Guard had truncated her name to Hamilton that year, but resumed using the full name in January 1942 after a request by the U.S. Navy to avoid confusion with the destroyer USS Hamilton.

=== Sinking ===
On January 29, 1942, the Alexander Hamilton was torpedoed on the starboard side by the German submarine U-132, which had been patrolling the Icelandic coast near Reykjavík. The explosion killed twenty men instantly and the total death toll was 26. After she capsized on January 30, salvage attempts were abandoned and the American destroyer USS Ericsson fired upon the wreck three times to send her to the bottom of the sea, 28 miles (45 km) from the coast.

=== Discovery of shipwreck ===
On August 19, 2009, the Icelandic Coast Guard discovered a shipwreck believed to be the Alexander Hamilton in Faxaflói. After she was positively identified using the technology of a Gavia AUV (autonomous underwater vehicle), Microsoft co-founder Paul Allen flew to Iceland in August 2010 with an entourage to visit the wreck in a mini-submarine. His luxury yacht, the Octopus, arrived separately at Reykjavík Harbour for the trip.

On June 26, 2011, a team of divers left Reykjavik at 5 am departing for Alexander Hamilton wreck. At 30 miles (48 km) out and 95 meters (312 ft) down, the wreck lies upside down. This is the first dive team that ever dived this wreck.

The dive went without any problems and the conditions were better than expected. The sea at the surface was pretty rough and most (including Icelandic Coast Guard) warned not to take the boat out, saying the dive was impossible to conduct under current conditions. Visibility at the wreck was around 4 metres (13 ft). Temperature was 45 °F (7 °C) at 90 m (300 ft), which was warmer than divers prepared for. During the deep dive the divers set three Icelandic diving records: Deepest wreck dive in Iceland, deepest sea dive in Iceland, and deepest dive ever made in Iceland.

== Attaching memorial plaque on Alexander Hamilton ==
Team Blue Immersion in partnership with the diving company OceanReef returned to Alexander Hamilton in August 2013. On the assignment from the families related to the men that served on the cutter during World War II the team dived down and attached a memorial plaque on the ship. The plaque listed all men that served and died during the attack by the German Type VII submarine on 29 January 1942, just seven and a half weeks after the attack on Pearl Harbor.

On August 10, just two days before the Team Blue Immersions reached the 1937 Alexander Hamilton, a new USCGC Hamilton was launched in the water for the first time. This ship is the sixth cutter named after Alexander Hamilton.

== Awards ==
- American Defense Service Medal
- American Campaign Medal
- European-African-Middle Eastern Campaign Medal with one battle star
- World War II Victory Medal
