= USS Ericsson (DD-440) =

Gleaves-class destroyer

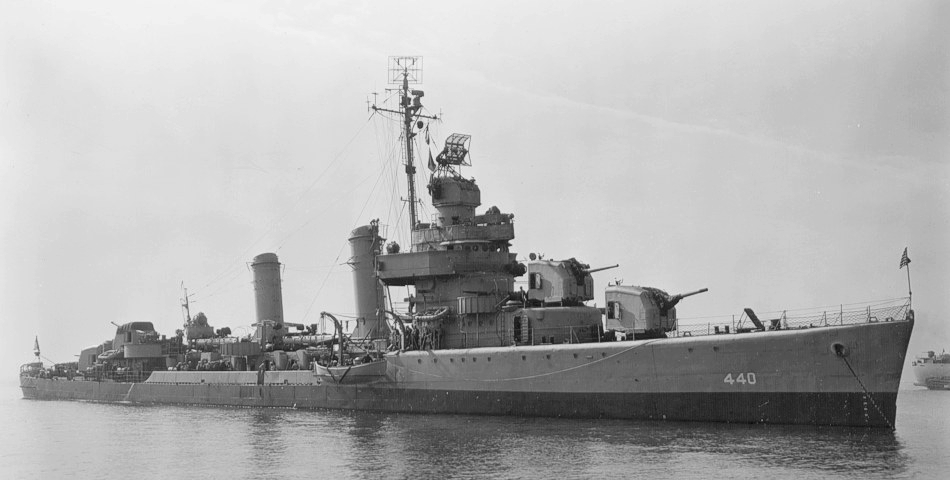
- USS Ericsson (DD-440) at anchor in September 1943.

History

United States
- Name: Ericsson
- Namesake: John Ericsson
- Operator: United States Navy
- Builder: Federal Shipbuilding and Drydock Company
- Laid down: 18 March 1940
- Launched: 23 November 1940
- Commissioned: 13 March 1941
- Decommissioned: 15 March 1946
- Stricken: 1 June 1970
- Fate: Sunk as target 17 November 1970

General characteristics
- Class & type: Gleaves-class destroyer
- Displacement: 1,630 tons
- Length: 348 ft 3 in (106.15 m)
- Beam: 36 ft 1 in (11.00 m)
- Draft: 11 ft 10 in (3.61 m)
- Propulsion: 50,000 shp (37,000 kW); 4 boilers; 2 propellers
- Speed: 37.4 knots (69 km/h)
- Range: 6,500 nmi (12,000 km; 7,500 mi) at 12 kn (22 km/h; 14 mph)
- Complement: 16 officers, 260 enlisted
- Armament: 4 × 5 in (127 mm) DP guns, 6 × 0.5 in (12.7 mm) guns, 6 × 20 mm AA guns, 10 × 21 in (533 mm) torpedo tubes, 2 × depth charge tracks

USS Ericsson (DD-440), a Gleaves-class destroyer, was the third ship of the United States Navy to be named after John Ericsson, who is best known for devising and building the Civil War ironclad USS Monitor.

Ericsson was launched on 23 November 1940 by Federal Shipbuilding and Drydock Co., Kearny, New Jersey; sponsored by Mrs. Ruth E. Wallgren, great-great-grandniece of John Ericsson. The ship was commissioned on 13 March 1941.

== Service history ==
=== 1941–1942 ===
After shakedown, Ericsson arrived at Norfolk, Virginia, her home port, on 2 May 1941. Immediately Ericsson began operations along the East Coast and Bermuda, training Naval Reserve midshipmen, exercising with submarines, making tests of her equipment and machinery, and joining in battle practice. In the fall of 1941, she twice voyaged to Newfoundland and Iceland, escorting convoys, continuing this service after the United States entered World War II. Patrolling off NS Argentia, Newfoundland on 15 January 1942, she sighted the life rafts of sunken SS Dayrose, from which she rescued two survivors. Her rescue work also includes patrol service during the rescue of survivors from the torpedoed Coast Guard cutter USCGC Hamilton on 30 January 1942.

A little later, on 13 February, Ericsson sailed on an Icelandic fishing boat, Græðir, just outside Reykjavík. This happened about 1 a.m. and the Græðir sank instantly. One Icelandic sailor drowned but the crew of the Ericsson managed to rescue six others.

Ericsson escorted a convoy to the Panama Canal Zone in May 1942, and another to Ireland and Scotland in June. Through the remainder of the summer, she escorted convoys along the east coast and in the Caribbean and took part in exercises, and also patrolled out of San Juan, Puerto Rico. On 24 October, she sortied from Norfolk for the invasion of North Africa, and took part in the landings on the coast of French Morocco 8 November. For the next week she offered direct fire support to the troops ashore, assisting in knocking out four enemy batteries on a ridge commanding the landing area the first day; she also screened transports lying off the beach. Ericsson returned to Norfolk 26 November.

=== 1943–1944 ===
After a brief overhaul at Charleston, Ericsson returned to patrol and escort duty in the Caribbean and to Recife and Trinidad. In May 1943, she made the first of five convoy escort voyages to Casablanca from east coast ports, between which she joined in training, and patrolled the western Atlantic. On 11 February 1944 she arrived at Gibraltar for duty in the Mediterranean, and through the next six months, operated primarily to support the troops fighting the bitter campaign for Italy. She escorted convoys and carried passengers between north African and Italian ports, bombarded points near the fiercely contested Anzio area and in the Gulf of Gaeta, patrolled off anchorages and harbors, and joined in exercises preparing for the invasion of southern France.

On 13 August 1944, Ericsson sortied from Malta in a task group composed primarily of British ships, but including one French ship and the remainder of Ericsson's division. This group covered one section of the amphibious landings on southern France from 15 to 17 August, and Ericsson, after screening the battleship HMS Ramillies to Corsica, returned to join an American task group and fire bombardments along the French coast. She also served on patrol, and on 27 August intercepted a trawler, in which the crew of German submarine U-230, previously grounded and scuttled in the area, were attempting to escape through the American patrol line. Fifty prisoners were thus taken. Ericsson remained in the Mediterranean for patrol and escort assignments until 11 November, when she sailed from Oran to the Azores on escort duty. Upon her return to Gibraltar, she got underway for New York City, arriving 30 November for overhaul.

After refresher training, Ericsson escorted a convoy to Oran from the east coast in April 1945, and while returning to Boston, on 5 May joined Atherton and Moberly in a submarine hunt off Block Island. With other ships joining from time to time, and two airships helping to determine the final sinking, the three ships found and sank the German submarine U-853. At Boston from 6 May to 18 June, Ericsson prepared for Pacific service, and after training in the Caribbean and at Pearl Harbor, escorted a group of transports to Saipan, arriving 13 September 1945.

=== Convoys escorted ===
| Convoy | Escort Group | Dates | Notes |
|---|---|---|---|
| HX 150 | | 17-25 Sept 1941 | from Newfoundland to Iceland prior to US declaration of war |
| ON 22 | | 7-15 Oct 1941 | from Iceland to Newfoundland prior to US declaration of war |
| HX 157 | | 30 Oct-8 Nov 1941 | from Newfoundland to Iceland prior to US declaration of war |
| ON 35 | | 15-27 Nov 1941 | from Iceland to Newfoundland prior to US declaration of war |
| AT 18 | | 6-17 Aug 1942 | troopships from New York City to Firth of Clyde |

=== 1945, transfer to Pacific and fate ===
Ericsson sailed to Okinawa, Japan, the Philippines, and back to Japan again on escort duty until leaving Sasebo astern 14 October 1945, bound with servicemen eligible for discharge to San Diego. She continued to Charleston, arriving 5 December 1945, and there was decommissioned 15 March 1946 and placed in reserve.

Ericsson received three battle stars for World War II service.
