= Akvaryumda Sessiz Sakin =

Akvaryumda Sessiz, Sakin
- Directed by: Tayfun Belet
- Produced by: Tayfun Belet
- Cinematography: Tayfun Belet
- Edited by: Tayfun Belet
- Music by: Ömer Oral
- Distributed by: Tabu Film Production
- Release date: 2016
- Running time: 21 minutes 54 seconds
- Country: Turkey
- Language: Turkish

Akvaryumda Sessiz, Sakin, is a film by Tayfun Belet made in 2016. The international name is "Peace and Quiet in the Aquarium".

== Synopsis ==
The film depicts the struggles of women who have married into the fisherman life. Some have not even seen the sea until they married and moved in with their husband. Hopes, dreams and fears of these fisherwomen who reside in Datça, Bozburun are explored in this documentary.

== Awards ==
- BUZZ CEE - International Buzau Film Festival, Finalist. 2016
- International Balkan Film Food Festival, Official Selection. 2016
- SABC International Ekurhuleni Film Festival, Finalist. 2016
- International Baikal Film Festivali, Official Selection. 2016
- International One Country One Film Festival, Official Selection. 2016
