= Bellett =

Bellett is an English surname. Notable people with the surname include:

- John Gifford Bellett (1795–1864), Irish writer and theologian
- Wally Bellett (born 1933), English footballer
- James Bellett Richey (1834–1902), British politician

== See also ==
- Isuzu Bellett, subcompact car produced by the Japanese manufacturer Isuzu
- Isuzu Bellett Gemini, subcompact car
- Bellet
- Belet
