= Tayfun Belet =

Turkish director and filmmaker

- Born: Tayfun Belet; İzmir, Turkey
- Occupation: Filmmaker
- Years active: 2006–present

Tayfun Belet is a Turkish film director, screenwriter, producer and film editor.

== Biography ==
Belet was born into a family from Urfa/Siverek in İzmir. He attended high school at Fatma Saygun Anadolu Lisesi and continued onto Yaşar University on a full scholarship in the Radio, Cinema and Television Department. He then continued his master's degree at the same school and graduated from the Art and Design Program. Belet continued his academic career as a teacher in the same department.

In 2006, prior to his directing career, he served as an assistant director. Belet has worked on 10 documentary-cinema films and a variety of commercials.

He generally uses the themes of women, children and hope in his films. He has been a part of the jury at film festivals. For the music in his films, he has worked with Erkin Koray, Hüsnü Şenlendirici, Cengiz Onural, İncesaz, Jah Wobble and Ömer Oral. Belet is also the owner of a company named Tabu Film Production.

== Filmography ==
Year	Name	Awards
2006	Anılarla Atatürk ("Remembering Atatürk")	
2009	Kahve ("Coffee")	
2009	Kalay ("Tin")	
2011	İfrat ("Overkill")	Ahmadabad Film Festival, Official Selection. 2011; Cinemalaya Film Festival, Official Selection. 2011; International Kraków Film Festival, Kraków Dragon Award. 2011; International Didor Film Festival, Official Selection. 2011; International Abu Dhabi Film Festival, Official Selection. 2011; Jakarta Film Festival, Official Selection. 2011; International Dungog Film Festival, Official Selection. 2011
2013	Sterliçya ("Bird of Paradise")	Dld Summit, Special Screening. 2013; Dld, Gratitude Plaque. 2013
2013	Yüksek Yerin Halkı ("People of the High Place")	International Pergamon Festival, Special Screening. 2014
2014	Çırak ("The Apprentice")	6. TRT Documentary Awards, International Professional Category, Republic Of Turkey Ministry Of Culture Tourism, Special Prize. 2014; International Pergamon Festival, Special Screening. 2014; UNESCO, Success Award. 2014; SABC Ekurhuleni International Film Festival, Finalist. 2016; International Human District Film Festival, Official Selection. 2016; International Amsterdam Craft in Focus Film Festival, Official Selection. 2016; Matsalu Nature Film Festival, Finalist. 2016
2014	Havin ("Havin")	
2015	Çekirdek ve Makara ("The Reel and the Sunflower Seeds")	7. TRT Documentary Awards, International Professional Category, Finalist. 2015
2016	Akvaryumda Sessiz, Sakin ("Peace and Quiet in the Aquarium")	BUZZ CEE - International Buzau Film Festival, Finalist. 2016; International Balkan Film Food Festival, Official Selection. 2016; SABC International Ekurhuleni Film Festival, Finalist. 2016; International Baikal Film Festivali, Official Selection. 2016; International One Country One Film Festival, Official Selection. 2016
