= Michael Belet (junior) =

Michael Belet (fl. 1238) was an English judge and Augustinian, second son of Michael Belet (senior).

He was presented in 1200-1 by the king to the living of Hinclesham in the Diocese of Norwich. In the roll De Oblatis for 1201 occurs the curious memorandum, of which the following is a translation: 'Master Michael Belet offers the lord the king, on behalf of his sister, 40 marks for the hand of Robert de Candos, which is in the gift of the lord the king. And Geoffrey Fitz Peter is authorised to accept the aforesaid fine of 40 marks, provided it be for the profit of the king so to do, because if that be so, it is granted to him because he is in the service of the king.' In 1203-4 he was presented by the king to the living of Setburgham (now Serbergham, near Hesket Newmarket) in the Diocese of Carlisle. At a subsequent period, the precise date of which cannot be fixed, he incurred the 'ill will' (malevolentia) of the king, who caused him to be ejected from his manor of Shene in Surrey, which he held upon the tenure of 'sergeanty of butlery' to the king, and only re-instated him (in 1213) upon payment of a fine of 500 marks. He was not at the same time restored to the office of royal butler, of which he had also been deprived. On the whole, however, Belet seems to have been a faithful servant of the king, and in 1216 he received the lands of one Wischard Ledet, who is described as being 'with the king's enemies.' In 1223 he was appointed receiver of the rents of the see of Coventry, and in 1225 auditor of the accounts of the justices to whom the collection of the quinzieme was assigned, and himself assigned to collect it in Northamptonshire. This is probably the reason why Dugdale includes him among the barons. He is mentioned by Matthew Paris in 1236 as playing his part with due solemnity as royal butler on the occasion of the banquet in honour of the marriage of the king with Eleanor of Provence. Some few years previously, probably in 1230, he founded at Wroxton a priory for canons regular of the order of St. Augustine, endowing it with Wroxton Manor and Balescote Manor, and the churches of Aunsby and Siston, Lincolnshire. The grant was confirmed by a charter of Henry III. The priory or abbey, as it came to be called, continued in existence till the dissolution of religious houses in Henry VIII's reign. The property afterwards came into the family of the earls of Downe. The present tenant, the Baroness North, is a descendant of the lord keeper Guilford, who married a sister of the last Earl of Downe. A few fragments of the original building are preserved in the existing structure, which was erected between 1600 and 1618 by the earl of Downe of that day.
