= USS Belet =

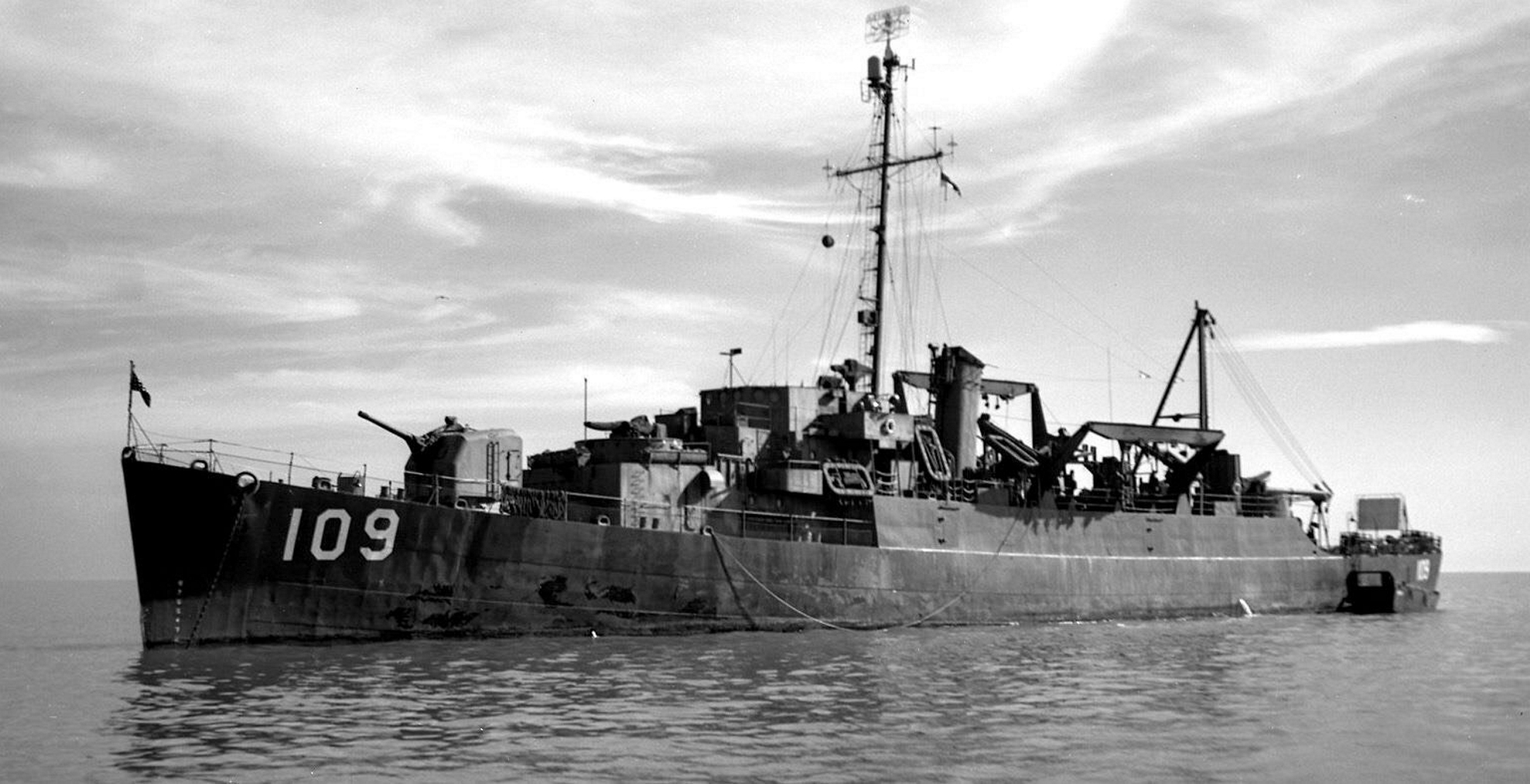

History

United States
- Name: USS Belet (DE-599)
- Namesake: Robert A. Belet
- Builder: Bethlehem-Hingham Shipyard, Inc., Hingham, Massachusetts
- Laid down: 26 January 1944
- Launched: 3 March 1944
- Sponsored by: Mrs. Eleanor J. Belet
- Reclassified: APD-109, 17 July 1944
- Commissioned: 15 June 1945
- Decommissioned: 22 May 1946
- Stricken: 12 December 1963
- Fate: Transferred to Mexican Navy, 12 December 1963

History

Mexico
- Name: ARM California (B-3)
- Namesake: Gulf of California
- Acquired: 12 December 1963
- Reclassified: B03, before April 1970
- Fate: wrecked Baja California, 16 January 1972

General characteristics
- Class & type: Rudderow-class destroyer escort, as ordered
- Class & type: Crosley-class high speed transport, as completed
- Displacement: 2,130 long tons (2,164 t) full
- Length: 306 ft (93 m)
- Beam: 37 ft (11 m)
- Draft: 12 ft 7 in (3.84 m)
- Speed: 23 knots (43 km/h; 26 mph)
- Troops: 162
- Complement: 204
- Armament: 1 × 5 in (130 mm) gun; 6 × 40 mm guns; 6 × 20 mm guns; 2 × depth charge tracks

USS Belet (APD-109) was a Crosley-class high-speed transport in service with the United States Navy from 1945 to 1946. In 1963, she was transferred to Mexico, where she served as ARM California (H03/B-3). She was wrecked in 1972.

== Namesake ==
Robert Alfred Belet was born on 6 August 1914 at Blairstown, New Jersey. He first enlisted in the United States Marine Corps in January 1937 at New York City and then reenlisted on 22 January 1941. Belet served at Marine Corps Recruit Depot Parris Island, South Carolina; Marine Corps Base Quantico, Virginia; Washington, D.C.; and New River, North Carolina, before moving to the Pacific Theater on 19 June 1942.

As a member of the 1st Signal Company, 1st Marine Division, in the Solomon Islands, Master Technical Sergeant Belet was at Guadalcanal on the night of 9 and 10 August 1942, during operations against Japanese forces. Belet supervised the repair of a communications wire in the face of persistent Japanese fire. His leadership contributed to the restoration of the vital communication circuit and for this action he was awarded the Silver Star. Belet was later killed in action at Guadalcanal on 12 September 1942.

== Construction and commissioning ==
Belet was laid down as the Rudderow-class destroyer escort USS Belet (DE-599) on 26 January 1944 by Bethlehem-Hingham Shipyard, Inc., at Hingham, Massachusetts, and was launched on 3 March 1944, sponsored by Mrs. Eleanor J. Belet, the widow of the ship's namesake, Robert Belet. The ship was reclassified as a Crosley-class high-speed transport and redesignated APD-109 on 17 July 1944. After conversion to her new role, she was commissioned on 15 June 1945.

== Service history ==
After taking on stores, Belet got underway on 3 July 1945 for Guantanamo Bay, Cuba, for four weeks of shakedown training. Following shakedown, she stood out of Norfolk, Virginia, on 13 August 1945 with a full load of passengers, bound for World War II service in the Pacific Theater of Operations. The next day while at sea, the ship received the news of the surrender of Japan, but she continued on to San Diego, California, where she arrived on 27 August 1945.

On 1 September 1945, Belet departed San Diego and set course for the Mariana Islands. She stopped at Pearl Harbor, Territory of Hawaii, only long enough to take on fuel and provisions and then touched briefly at Eniwetok Atoll before arriving at Saipan on 17 September 1945. Belet operated out of Saipan, shuttling troops as needed and providing escort and lifeguard services.

Belet left the Marianas on 8 October 1945 and headed for occupation duty in Japan. On 11 October 1945, she relieved the United States Coast Guard Cutter USCGC Taney (WPG-37) as port director ship at Wakayama, Japan. Belet remained at this station until ordered back to the United States in December 1945.

On her homeward voyage, Belet carried returning servicemen into San Diego in January 1946 and was then ordered back to the United States East Coast. Following repairs at the Boston Navy Yard in Boston, Massachusetts, she steamed to Green Cove Springs, Florida, for inactivation.

== Decommissioning and disposal ==
Belet was decommissioned on 22 May 1946 and placed in reserve with the Green Cove Springs Group of the Atlantic Reserve Fleet. After over 17 years of inactivity, she was declared excess to the needs of the U.S. Navy, and her name was struck from the Navy List on 12 December 1963.

== Mexican Navy service ==
Sold to Mexico on 12 December 1963, Belet became ARM California (H03) in the Mexican Navy. She was later assigned the new pennant number of B03.

California ran aground on the Bahia Peninsula on 16 January 1972 broadside to the beach, and was judged unsalvageable. Abandoned, her hulk broke up on the rocks.
