= Michael Belet (senior) =

English judge of late 12th century

Michael Belet (died 1201) was an English judge and sheriff.

== Early life ==
Belet was the son of Hervey Belet. His mother's name is unknown. Hervey owned land in Oxfordshire and Northamptonshire.

Belet was holding four knights fees in 1166 from Robert Foliot, one of which was likely Wroxton Manor in Oxfordshire. Besides the fees he held of Foliot, he also had the manors of Sheen and Bagshot in Surrey. He was Sheriff of Worcestershire 1175 to 1185, of Warwickshire in 1186 to 1189, and of Leicestershire in 1186 to 1189. He served as a justice itinerant from 1176 to 1180, and often again until the end of Henry II's reign. Besides service as sheriff and justice, Belet held the office of hereditary royal butler. He also served in the exchequer occasionally.

When Richard I became king, Belet paid £100 to obtain confirmation of his office as butler. Belet remained a justice until his death in 1201, serving Richard from 1189 until 1192, and then again from 1197 until 1201.

Belet married Emma, daughter of John de Chesney, the couple had seven sons and three daughters. His wife survived him. The sons were John, Michael, Hervey, William, Robert, Adam, and Eustache. The daughters were Annora, who married Walter de Verdun, Emma, and Rohais. Either Emma or Rohais married Robert de Chandos. On his death, his estates passed to his eldest son, Hervey, who died in 1207–1208 without issue, and was succeeded by his brother Michael, who paid a fine of £100 upon the succession.
