= Çırak (film) =

- Film poster
- Directed by: Tayfun Belet
- Produced by: Tayfun Belet
- Cinematography: Tayfun Belet
- Edited by: Tayfun Belet
- Music by: Hüsnü Şenlendirici, Cengiz Onural
- Distributed by: Tabu Film Production
- Release date: 2014
- Running time: 21 minutes 40 seconds
- Country: Turkey
- Language: Turkish

Çırak is a film by Tayfun Belet made in 2014. The international name is "The Apprentice".

== Synopsis ==
The film depicts the last parchment master in Turkey, which happens to be a woman despite it being viewed as a job for men. The circumstances and events that lead to this situation are shown in the documentary. The last parchment master happens to be in Bergama, where parchment was first created, and the documentary touches on the history of parchment itself.

== Awards ==
- 6. TRT Documentary Awards, International Professional Category, Republic Of Turkey Ministry Of Culture Tourism, Special Prize. 2014
- International Bergama Festival, Special Screening. 2014
- UNESCO, Success Award. 2014
- SABC Ekurhuleni International Film Festival, Finalist. 2016
- International Human District Film Festival, Official Selection. 2016
- International Amsterdam Craft in Focus Film Festival, Official Selection. 2016
- Matsalu Nature Film Festival, Finalist. 2016
