= Historic Ships in Baltimore =

Museum in Maryland, United States

Coordinates: 39.2861°N 76.6124°W

Historic Ships in Baltimore, created as a result of the merger of the USS Constellation Museum and the Baltimore Maritime Museum, is a maritime museum located in the Inner Harbor of Baltimore, Maryland in the United States.

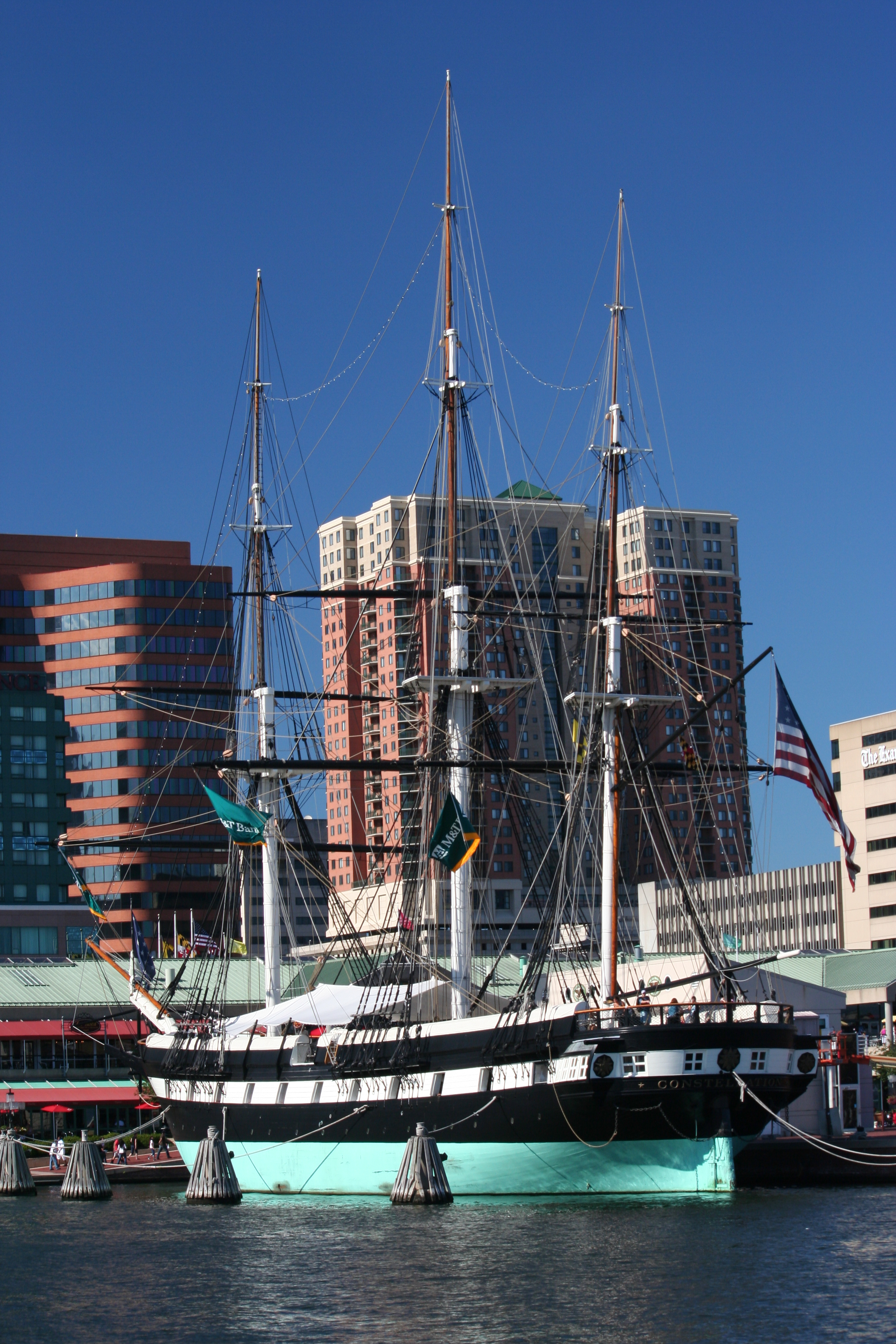
USS Constellation, docked in Baltimore

The museum's collection includes four historic museum ships and one lighthouse:

- USS Constellation, a sloop-of-war; the last sail-only warship designed and built by the United States Navy
- WHEC-37, a Coast Guard cutter; the last surviving warship that participated in the attack on Pearl Harbor
- USS Torsk (SS-423), a World War II-era submarine; credited with the last sinking of an enemy ship by the USN in that war
- Chesapeake (LV-116), a lightship; stationed at the entrance to the Chesapeake Bay for most of her 40-year service life
- Seven Foot Knoll Light, a screw-pile lighthouse

All are listed on the National Register of Historic Places. The four ships are also National Historic Landmarks.

The Liberty ship SS John W. Brown is also homeported out of Baltimore.

Historic Ships in Baltimore is an affiliate of the Living Classrooms Foundation.

== See also ==
- List of maritime museums in the United States
- List of museum ships
