= Bellet =

Bellet is a French surname. Notable people with this name include:

- Corinne Rey-Bellet (1972–2006), Swiss alpine skier
- François Bellet (1750–1827), Canadian captain, merchant, and politician
- Jean-Louis Bellet (1932–2023), French rower
- Maurizio Bellet (born 1952), Italian racing cyclist
- Pierre-Paul Pecquet du Bellet (1816–1884), American attorney, author and diplomat

== Other ==
- Bellet, a type of Provence wine

== See also ==
- Bellett
- Belet
