= USCGC Taney =

U.S. Coast Guard high endurance cutter

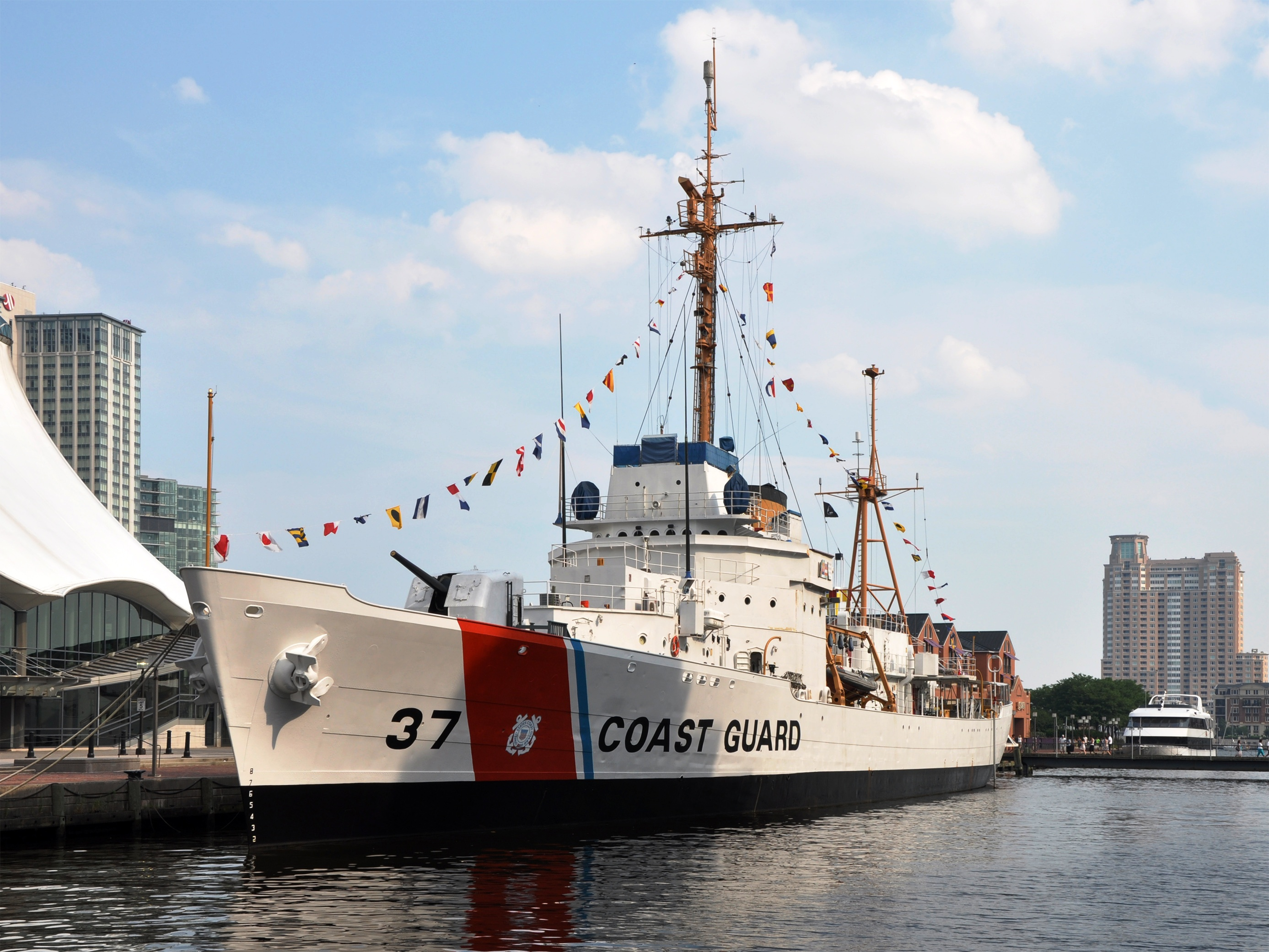
- Taney at Baltimore harbor in July 2011

History

United States
- Name: Roger B. Taney (1936—1937); Taney (1937—2020); WHEC-37 (2020 – present)
- Namesake: Roger B. Taney
- Builder: Philadelphia Naval Shipyard
- Laid down: 1 May 1935
- Launched: 3 June 1936
- Commissioned: 24 October 1936
- Decommissioned: 7 December 1986
- Identification: Call sign: NRDT
- Motto: Semper Paratus; 'Always Ready'
- Status: Museum ship
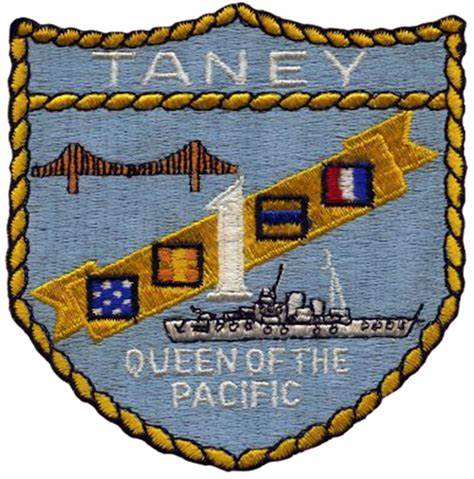
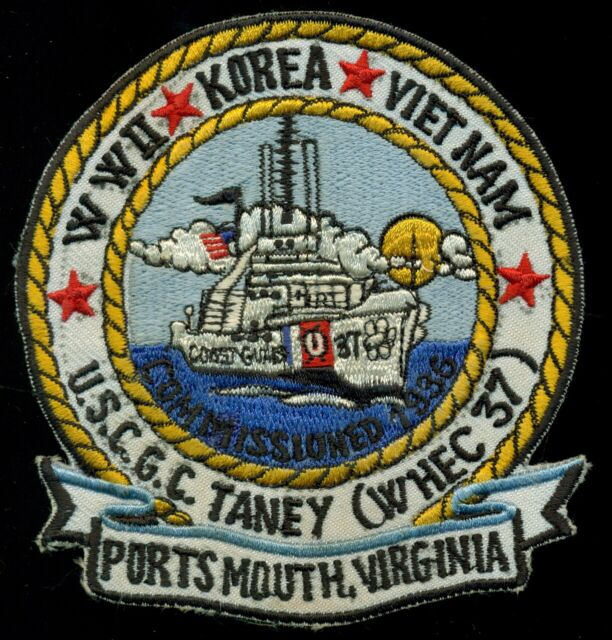
- Badge

General characteristics
- Class & type: Treasury-class cutter
- Displacement: 2,216 long tons (2,252 t; 2,482 short tons)
- Length: 327 ft (99.67 m) o/a
- Beam: 41 ft (12.50 m)
- Draft: 12.5 ft (3.81 m)
- Propulsion: 2 oil-fueled Babcock & Wilcox boilers; 2 shafts; Westinghouse geared turbines; 6,200 ihp (4,600 kW)
- Speed: 20.5 knots (38.0 km/h)
- Range: 12,300 nautical miles (22,780 km) at 11 knots (20.4 km/h)
- Capacity: 135,180 US gallons (511,712 L)
- Complement: 1937: 12 officers, 4 warrants, 107 enlisted; 1941: 16 officers, 5 warrants, 200 enlisted; 1966: 10 officers, 3 warrants, 133 enlisted; 1986: 10 officers, 2 warrants, 117 enlisted
- Sensors & processing systems: 1945: Radar: SC, SG-1; Fire Control Radar: Mk-26; Sonar: QC series; 1966: Radar: AN/SPS-29D; AN/SPA-52; Fire Control Radar: Mk-26 MOD 4; Sonar: AN/SQS-11
- Armament: 1936: 3 × 5″/51 cal; 2 × 6-pounders; 1 × 1-pounder; 1941: 2 × 5"/51 caliber guns; 4 × 3"/50 caliber guns; 2 × depth charge racks; 1 × "Y" gun depth charge projector; 1943: 4 × 5"/38 caliber guns (only cutter in class to be so armed); 8 × 20 mm/80 cal; 1 × Hedgehog; 2 × depth charge racks; 6 × K-gun depth charge throwers; 1945: 2 × 5″/38 cal turret; 6 × 40 mm/60 cal (twin mount); 4 × 20 mm/80 cal; 1946: 1 × 5″/38 cal turret; 1 × 40mm/60 cal (twin mount); 2 × 20mm/80 cal; 1 × Hedgehog; 2 × depth charge racks; ? × depth charge projectors; 1966: 1 × 5″/38 cal turret; 1 × Mk52 MOD3 Director; 1 × Mk10-1 Hedgehog; 2 (P&S) × Mk32 MOD5TT; 4 × MK44 MOD1 torpedoes; 2 × 50cal MK2 Browning MG; 2 × MK13 high altitude parachute flare mortars; 1986; 1 × 5″/38 cal turret; 2 × 50cal MK2 Browning MG
- Aircraft carried: 1 Grumman JF-2 Duck
- USCGC TANEY (WHEC-37)
- U.S. National Register of Historic Places
- U.S. National Historic Landmark
- Location within Baltimore Location within Maryland Location within the United States
- Location: 1101 Key Hwy., Baltimore, Maryland
- Coordinates: 39°17′09″N 76°36′23″W
- Built: 1936
- Architect: U.S. Coast Guard; Philadelphia Naval Shipyard
- Architectural style: Treasury-class cutter
- NRHP reference No.: 88001826

Significant dates
- Added to NRHP: 7 June 1988
- Designated NHL: 7 June 1988

WPG/WAGC/WHEC-37, launched as USCGC Roger B. Taney and for most of her career called USCGC Taney (/ˈtɔːni/), is a United States Coast Guard high endurance cutter notable as the last warship floating which fought in the attack on Pearl Harbor. She was named for Roger B. Taney (1777–1864), who served as U.S. Attorney General, Secretary of the Treasury, and Chief Justice of the United States.

She is also one of two Treasury-class (out of seven total) Coast Guard cutters still afloat. Active for 50 years, Taney saw action in both theaters of combat in World War II, serving as a command ship at the Battle of Okinawa, and as a fleet escort in the Atlantic and Mediterranean. She also served in the Vietnam War, taking part in Operation Market Time. Taney was also used in drug interdiction and fisheries protection work.

She was decommissioned in 1986, and has since served as a museum ship in the Inner Harbor of Baltimore, Maryland. She was designated a National Historic Landmark in 1988. In 2020, Historic Ships in Baltimore and the Living Classrooms Foundation removed the name Taney from the ship, in recognition of her namesake's historical acts of racial injustice, instead identifying her as simply WHEC-37.

== 1936–1941 ==
Treasury-class Roger B. Taney, Coast Guard Builders No. 68, was laid on 1 May 1935 at the Philadelphia Navy Yard. She was launched on 3 June 1936 and was sponsored by Miss Corinne F. Taney. She was commissioned at Philadelphia on 24 October 1936. The Roger B. Taney departed Philadelphia on 19 December, transited the Panama Canal from 27 to 29 December, and arrived at her home port, Honolulu, Territory of Hawaii, on 18 January 1937. She conducted local operations out of Honolulu through the summer of 1937. On 16 June 1937, she transferred a number of her crew for temporary duty to USCGC Itasca. The Itasca was preparing to lend navigational support to Amelia Earhart's flight around the world. In May or June 1937 Roger B. Taney's name was shortened to simply Taney.

The Taney had arrived in the Pacific at a time when the United States, and Pan-American Airways in particular, was expanding its commercial air travel capabilities. The "Clipper" flights across the Pacific to the Far East made islands like Hawaii, Midway, Guam, and Wake Island important way-stations. Other islands and islets assumed greater importance when a route across the South Pacific was mapped out to Australia and Samoa. The military benefits which accrued to the United States by its expansion onto some of the more strategic bits of land in the broad Pacific were not lost upon President Franklin D. Roosevelt, who undertook, in the late 1930s, to annex territory in the Pacific.

Two such places were Kanton and Enderbury Islands. The Taney played a role in their colonization by the United States. In early March 1938, the Coast Guard cutter loaded supplies and embarked colonists who would establish the claim of the United States upon the two islands that seemed—at least to the uninitiated—to be mere hunks of coral, rock, and scrub in the Central Pacific. She disembarked four Hawaiians at Enderbury Island on 6 March 1938 and landed a second contingent—of seven colonists—at Canton Island on the next day. The men, assisted by the Coast Guardsmen, erected buildings and laid the foundations for future signal towers.

The Coast Guard's task over the ensuing years leading up to the outbreak of war in the Pacific was to supply these isolated way-stations along the transpacific air routes and to relieve the colonists at stated intervals. Taney performed these supply missions into 1940. Meanwhile, tension continued to rise in the Far East as Japan cast covetous glances at the American, British, Dutch, and French colonial possessions and marched deeper into embattled China.

As the Navy and Coast Guard began gradually increasing and augmenting the armament on its vessels to prepare them for the inexorably advancing war, Taney underwent her first major rearmament at the Pearl Harbor Navy Yard in December 1940. She received her last major pre-war refit at the Mare Island Navy Yard, Vallejo, California, in the spring of the following year, 1941. On 25 July 1941, the Coast Guard cutter was transferred to the Navy and reported for duty with the local defense forces of the 14th Naval District, maintaining her base at Honolulu.

Outside another "line island cruise" in the late summer, Taney operated locally out of Honolulu into the critical fall of 1941. She conducted regular harbor entrance and channel patrols, alternating often with one of the four old destroyers of Destroyer Division 80: USS Allen, Schley, Chew, and Ward.

== World War II ==
The message: "Air Raid, Pearl Harbor. This is no drill" came at 07:55 on 7 December 1941, as Japanese planes swept overhead in an attempt to cripple the Pacific Fleet. Taney, moored alongside Pier 6, Honolulu harbor, manned her anti-aircraft guns within four minutes. Officers not aboard were ordered to return and the ship readied to get underway. The ship began firing newly installed three inch guns at Japanese planes passing high overhead. The ship fired on a second and third group of attacking planes, the last of which flew over the Honolulu harbor entrance, perhaps intending to attack the power plant, and was low enough to be engaged by the 50 caliber machine guns. The Japanese planes changed course to avoid Taney's fire. Coast Guardsmen from the Taney were ordered to take up defensive positions around Aloha Tower and protect it from being occupied.

The ship got underway at 0546 on 8 December to patrol the harbor approaches making seven sound contacts and dropping depth charges during the patrol that ended on 14 December. Taney patrolled the waters off Honolulu for the remainder of 1941 and into 1942, conducting many depth charge attacks on suspected submarines in the wake of the Pearl Harbor attack. During this time, the ship received the classification WPG-37. On 22 January 1942, the cutter departed Honolulu in company with USAT Barbara Olson, and arrived at Kanton Island on 28 January 1942. After sending a working party ashore to unload supplies, Taney screened Barbara Olson offshore until 7 February 1942, when both ships got under way to evacuate the American colony on Enderbury Island. Embarking the four colonists at 10:15 that day, Taney shelled the island and destroyed its buildings to prevent them from being used by Japanese forces. Taney subsequently escorted her merchantman consort to Jarvis Island, where she evacuated the four Interior Department colonists and burned all structures to the ground before departing. Reaching Palmyra Atoll on 12 February 1942, the ships remained there until 15 February 1942, before Taney headed back for the Hawaiian Islands, arriving at Honolulu on 5 March 1942. She made another voyage to Palmyra Island later that spring and when heading back to Hawaii, she received orders to search for survivors in the waters around Midway Island after the Battle of Midway, including a stop at the island itself.

Taney operated locally out of Honolulu into 1943 before sailing for Boston late that winter. Before heading for the east coast the ship was re-gunned with four single-mount 5-inch guns at Mare Island, the only ship in her class with this modification. After making port at Boston on 14 March 1944, Taney shifted south, arriving at Hampton Roads on 31 March 1944. Early in April, she departed Norfolk as a unit of Task Force 66 (TF 66), convoy guide for convoy UGS-38. The convoy made landfall off the Azores without incident on 13 April 1944.

Some 35 minutes after sunset on 20 April 1944, the convoy was spotted and tracked by the Germans, who launched a three-pronged attack with Junkers Ju 88 and Heinkel He 111 medium bombers. Each flew very low, using the shoreline as a background, confusing the search radar of the Allied ships. The first wave struck from dead ahead, torpedoing SS Paul Hamilton and SS Samite. Hamilton, which had been carrying both a load of ammunition and hundreds of Army Air Force personnel, blew up in an explosion that killed all 504 men on board.

The second wave of German torpedo planes hit the SS Stephen F. Austin and SS Royal Star. Two torpedoes passed close by Taney. The third wave damaged USS Lansdale, which later sank. All of the damaged vessels reached Bizerte, Tunisia, on 21 April 1944. Taney later departed Bizerte with homeward-bound convoy GUS-38 and arrived at New York City on 21 May 1944.

Taney participated in two more round-trip convoy escort missions, with convoys UGS/GUS-45 and UGS/GUS-52. Detached as a unit of TF 66 on 9 October 1944, she sailed for the Boston Navy Yard soon thereafter for extensive yard work to convert her to an amphibious command ship. During this metamorphosis, Taney — classified as WAGC-37 — was fitted with accommodations for an embarked flag officer and his staff, and with increased communications and radar facilities. Her main battery was changed to two open-mount 5-inch guns and 40- and 20-millimeter antiaircraft guns. Taney departed Boston on 19 January 1945, bound for Norfolk, Virginia.

She conducted shakedown and training in her new configuration before departing the east coast and sailing, via the Panama Canal and San Diego, to Hawaii. Arriving at Pearl Harbor on 22 February 1945, she soon embarked Rear Admiral Calvin H. Cobb and later underwent various minor repairs. New communications equipment was also installed before the ship departed the Hawaiian Islands for the Marshalls on 10 March 1945.

Taney proceeded independently via Eniwetok and arrived at Ulithi on 23 March 1945, remaining there until 7 April 1945. Joining Task Group 51.8 (TG 51.8), the amphibious command ship proceeded to Okinawa and arrived off the Hagushi beaches amidst air raid alerts on 11 April, experiencing five "red alerts". The ship briefly shifted to Kerama Retto on 13 April, returning to Hagushi on 15 April.

By the end of May 1945, Taney had gone to general quarters 119 times, with the crew remaining at battle stations for up to nine hours at a stretch. During this period off Okinawa in April and May, Taney shot down four suicide planes and assisted in numerous other "kills". The command ship also conducted combat information center duties, maintaining complete radar and air coverage, receiving and evaluating information on both friendly and enemy activities. On one occasion, Taney's duties took her close enough inshore to be fired on by a Japanese shore battery.

Suicide air attacks by the Japanese continued throughout June 1945, although most were intercepted by combat air patrol (CAP) fighters and shot down before they could reach their targets. Such raids took place on 18 out of 30 days that month. On 25 June 1945, at 01:20, a float seaplane passed near Taney and was shot down by the command ship and batteries ashore. During this month-long period, at least 288 enemy planes attacked the ships in Taney's vicinity, of which at least 96 were destroyed.

In mid-July 1945 a typhoon forced the ships at Hagushi to take evasive action. Taney led a convoy eastward on 19 July 1945 and returned the next day when the storm passed. She performed the same duties again on 1 August 1945 when she led a convoy to sea on typhoon-evasion operations. The ship returned to its anchorage on 3 August 1945.

The end of the war found Taney still off Okinawa. On 16 August 1945, she got under way to support USS Pennsylvania (BB-38) as three Japanese planes were detected approaching from the northeast. One crashed 30 miles (48 km) to the north, and two crashed into the sea shortly thereafter. On 25 August 1945, TG 95.5 was dissolved, and Rear Admiral Cobb, who had been embarked during the Okinawa campaign, hauled down his flag and departed.

Taney soon proceeded to Japan, where she took part in the occupation of Wakayama, anchoring off the port city on 11 September 1945 and sending a working party ashore the next day. While anchored there, Taney weathered a typhoon on 17 September 1945. She was one of the few ships which stayed at her berth during the storm, her ground tackle holding well in the sticky clay bottom.

Departing Wakayama on 14 October 1945, Taney returned to the west coast of the United States, via Midway, and arrived at San Francisco on 29 October 1945. Moving on for the east coast, Taney transited the Panama Canal, and arrived at Charleston, South Carolina on 29 November 1945, where she was reconfigured as a patrol cutter, with a main battery of a single-mount 5-inch gun, an anti-submarine Hedgehog, a twin 40-millimeter mount, and two 20-millimeter guns, in addition to depth charge tracks and projectors, and was reclassified once again as WPG-37.

== 1946–1961 ==
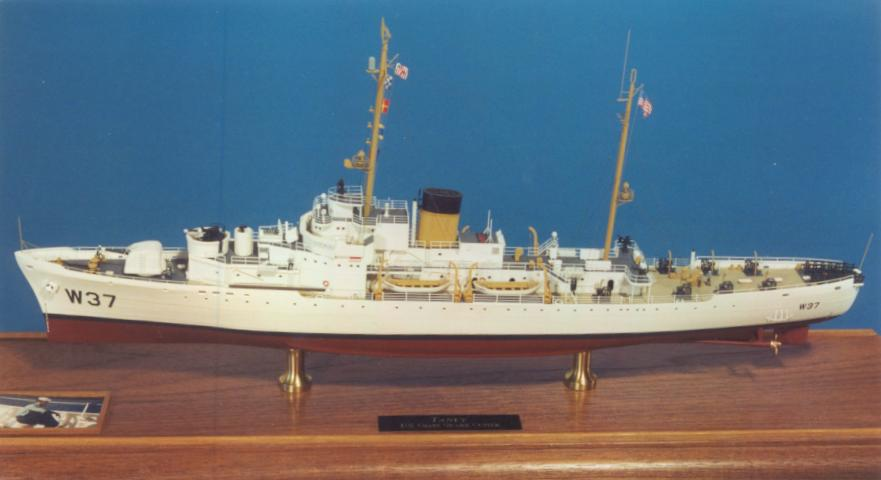
Model of Taney as the ship appeared in the 1950s

Upon shifting back to the west coast, Taney was based at Alameda, California until February 1972. Her primary post-war duty was serving as an ocean station weather ship. The weather patrols (later termed "ocean station patrols") consisted of sailing for three weeks on assigned stations in the Pacific, and each cutter assigned performed four or five such patrols each year. Their primary task was to report meteorological information, which was used in weather forecasts for the burgeoning trans-Pacific commercial air traffic as well as for surface vessels. The ocean station vessels also provided communications and navigation assistance and were always standing by for search and rescue emergencies. She also conducted dedicated law enforcement and search and rescue patrols, or stood on search and rescue standby, when she was not on ocean station duty.

In June through July 1949 Taney served on Ocean Station Fox and later in July she served on Ocean Station Able. In June 1950 she served on Ocean Station Oboe and in September she served on Ocean Station Fox. In January through February 1951 she served on Ocean Station Uncle and the following year, August to September, she served on Ocean Station Uncle.

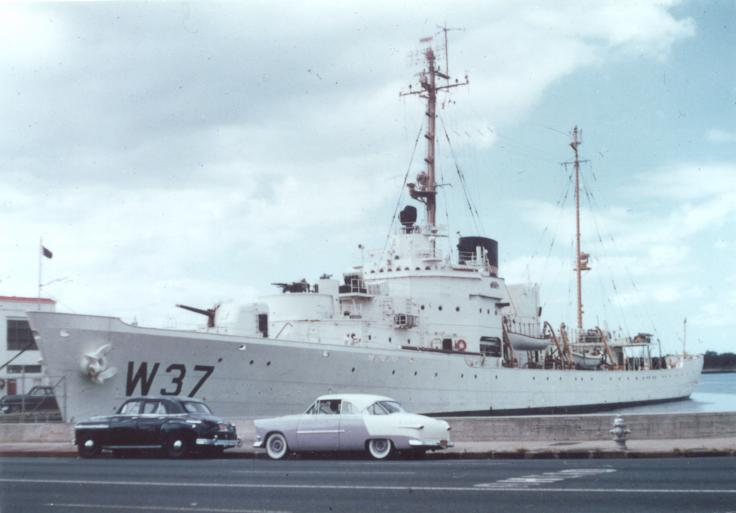
Taney at Honolulu in 1958

Later in 1952, from November to December, she served on Ocean Station Nan. In April to May 1953 Taney served on Ocean Station Victor and in June of that year she served on Ocean Station Victor. From 4 to 25 October 1953 she served on Ocean Station Uncle and from June to July 1954 she served on Ocean Station Nan. In November of that same year she again served on Ocean Station Nan. In March and April and again in June and July 1956 she served on Ocean Station November. She again served on Ocean Station November from January to February, June to July, and October to November 1957 and from February to March and August 1958. She served on Ocean Station Romeo from October to November 1958. She served on Ocean Station November from December 1958 to January 1959, May to June, and October to November 1959.

The Taney served on Ocean Station November in March and April 1960. A unique honor occurred on 27 April 1960 when Taney, as the senior U.S. ship present, hosted French President Charles de Gaulle on his tour of San Francisco Bay. She then served on Ocean Station November in August 1960. She served again on Ocean Station November in January and then from May to June 1961.

== 1965–1966 ==
On 1 May 1965 the Treasury-class vessels were re-designated as High Endurance Cutters or WHEC. This designation indicated a multi-mission ship able to operate at sea for 30–45 days without support and Taney was then re-classified as WHEC-37. In March 1965 she conducted an Alaskan Patrol and on 29 March she successfully fought a fire on board the disabled fishing vessel Glacier Bear 15 miles (24 km) south of Cape Fairweather and then towed her to safety. In May 1965, off northern California, she kept the Soviet refrigerator ship Chernjakhovsk under close surveillance.

In 1966 Taney undertook a 90-day "Double VICTOR Cruise". She departed Alameda on 26 August and arrived at Pearl Harbor on 1 September, where she refueled before steaming to Honolulu, mooring at Berth 8. She departed Honolulu on 3 September en route to Ocean Station Victor via Midway Island, arriving at the latter on 6 September, departing the same day. On 8 September 1966 Taney crossed the 180th meridian and then arrived at Ocean Station Victor on 11 September, relieving USCGC Chautauqua . She served on Victor until relieved by USCGC Winnebago on 1 October, then steamed towards Yokosuka, Japan. Here the crew enjoyed liberty before again heading back to the ocean station. She arrived at Victor on 22 October, relieving Winnebago. On 4 November Typhoon Marie passed close aboard Taney, with winds gusting close to 70 knots (130 km/h; 81 mph), but she weathered the storm without damage. On 12 November 1966 Taney was relieved again by Winnebago and she then steamed to Midway Island to refuel before heading back to Alameda, arriving there on 20 November.

== 1968–1971 ==
The Taney served on Ocean Station November from 7 to 28 January 18 February to 10 March 21 April to 12 May and 27 October to 17 November 1968. Her final assignment to Ocean Station November was from 19 January to 9 February 1969. She was then ordered for duty with Coast Guard Squadron Three which was supporting the Navy's Operation Market Time patrols off the coast of Vietnam. There Taney served a 10-month tour of duty, providing naval gunfire support and preventing enemy infiltration along the coastal routes used by the Viet Cong and North Vietnamese forces.

She departed U.S. waters in April 1969 and arrived in theater on 14 May 1969 and she served in the area until 31 January 1970. During her tour of duty, Taney steamed for over 52,000 miles (84,000 km) and inspected over 1,000 vessels. She participated in dozens of naval gunfire support missions, firing more than 3,400 five-inch (127 mm) shells at Viet Cong positions. Her medical staff also treated over 6,000 Vietnamese villagers. For her service, the government of the Republic of Vietnam (South Vietnam) awarded Taney the Vietnam Gallantry Cross with palm and the Vietnam Civil Actions Medal with palm. After departing Vietnamese waters, she arrived at Alameda in February 1970.

After returning to U.S. waters, she once again began serving on ocean stations. From 30 August to 20 September 1970 and from 3 to 24 January 1971 she served on Ocean Station November. From 28 March to 18 and 9 April to 30 May 1971 she served on Ocean Station Victor. She served on Ocean Station November from 22 August to 12 September and again from 24 October to 14 November 1971.

== 1972–1986 ==
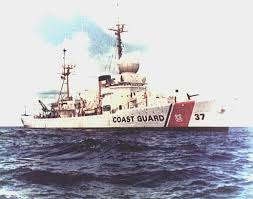
USCGC Taney fitted with a special storm-tracking radar system c. 1974

In February 1972 Taney was shifted back to the east coast and was homeported at Norfolk. From 2 September 1972 to 23 September 1972 she served on Ocean Station Hotel. Again from 13 to 22 October 1972 she conducted another Ocean Station Hotel. From 28 October to 17 November 1972 she served on Ocean Station Delta. From 26 January to 15 February. From 17 April to 7 May 1973 she served on Ocean Station Bravo. As the ocean stations were decommissioned during the early 1970s due to advances in radar and electronic navigation, Taney was assigned exclusively to the only station still operational: Ocean Station Hotel off the coasts of Maryland and Virginia. Fitted with a special storm-tracking antenna housed in a distinctive bulbous dome fitted atop her pilot house, Taney deployed seven times yearly, conducting 21 deployments 200 miles (320 km) off the coast. This last ocean station had been established to track storms threatening the middle states on the east coast which had often struck without warning. Eventually, the use of more sophisticated storm-tracking satellites and radars rendered this station obsolete. Hence, Ocean Station Hotel was closed down in 1977 and the Taney gained the distinction of being the last Coast Guard cutter to serve on an ocean station.

The mid-1970s were a period of transition for the Coast Guard with the passage of the Fisheries Conservation and Management Act and the nation's shift towards increased interdiction of narcotics smugglers. These operations called for off-shore patrols of up to three weeks. From September 1976 through her decommissioning she was stationed at Portsmouth, Virginia and began law enforcement and search and rescue patrols.

In December 1976 she assisted the sailboat Capella 200 miles (320 km) off New York. In December 1979 Taney helped seize the F/V Eneida for narcotics violations.

The month of January, 1980, was an unusually busy month for the crew of the Taney. On 10 January 1980, while underway on drug enforcement patrol duty, she was diverted to a Search and Rescue mission involving a lost Cessna 441 jet with two passengers. On 15 January 1980, she seized the MV Ameila Isle 425 miles (684 km) east of Fort Pierce, Florida, carrying 4 tons of contraband. She continued south for additional drug enforcement patrol throughout the Caribbean region. Including a patrol break in San Juan, Puerto Rico. The month concluded with Fishery Patrol off the coast of Nova Scotia, Canada. In December 1980 she seized the British-flagged M/V Party Doll which was carrying 10 tons of contraband. Despite being the long arm of the law at sea she continued in her traditional Coast Guard humanitarian mission of search and rescue as well. On 16 November 1982, she rescued seven persons from the disabled ketch Klarwasser off the coast of North Carolina and rescued 19 migrants off the sailboat Apre Dien Ni. In May 1985 she assisted the disabled F/V Northwind 300 miles (480 km) off New York. She also continued nabbing drug smugglers. On 30 September 1984, she seized the PC Thriller in the Yucatán Channel, carrying 1,000 pounds of marijuana. Her final bust occurred on 4 October 1985 when she seized the M/V Sea Maid I which was towing a barge that carried 160 tons of marijuana 300 miles (480 km) off Virginia.

== Fate ==
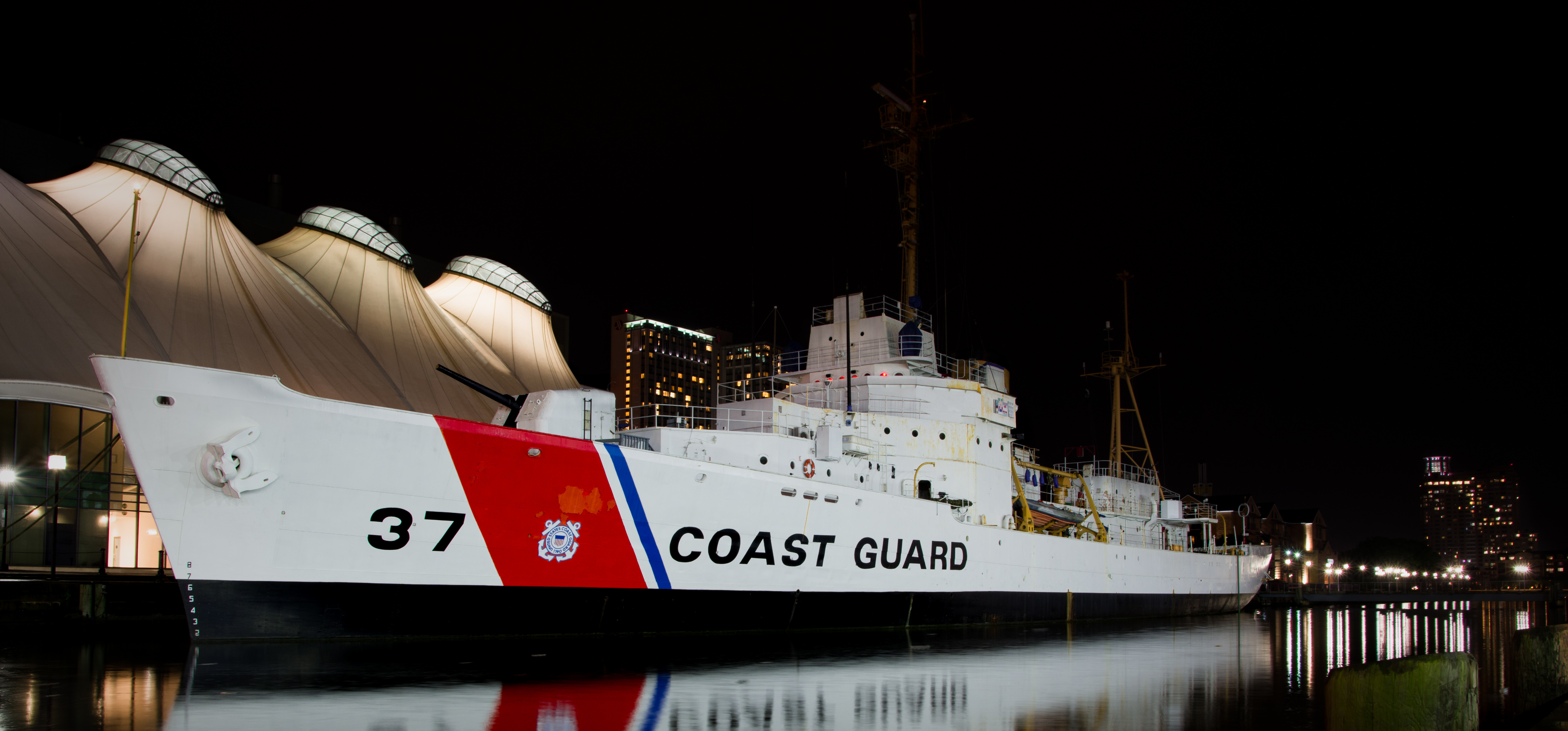

She was decommissioned on 7 December 1986 and turned over to the city of Baltimore, Maryland, for use as a museum ship. She is one of only two surviving vessels from the Attack on Pearl Harbor (The other being the tugboat Hoga.) Over her distinguished career, Taney received three battle stars for World War II service and numerous theater ribbons for service in World War II, the Korean War, and Vietnam War.

In 1988, USCGC Taney (WHEC-37), Structure – #88001826, was added to the National Register of Historic Places. She was designated a National Historic Landmark on the same day. Taney is located in the historic Baltimore Inner Harbor as part of the Historic Ships in Baltimore collection. Taney is included in the Baltimore National Heritage Area.

In 2020, Taney's name was removed from the warship by the Living Classrooms Foundation as part of a worldwide series of campaigns to remove monuments and change names associated with systemic racism following the murder of George Floyd. As Chief Justice of the United States who delivered the majority opinion in Dred Scott v. Sandford case (1857) that held that African Americans were not full citizens. The change was recognized by the United States Coast Guard on June 12, 2020.

== Awards ==
- Coast Guard Meritorious Unit Commendation
- Navy Meritorious Unit Commendation
- American Defense Service Medal
- American Campaign Medal
- European-African-Middle Eastern Campaign Medal with one battle star
- Asiatic-Pacific Campaign Medal with two battle stars
- World War II Victory Medal
- Navy Occupation Service Medal with "ASIA" clasp
- National Defense Service Medal with one service star
- Korean Service Medal
- Vietnam Service Medal with three campaign stars
- Humanitarian Service Medal
- Vietnam Gallantry Cross with palm
- Vietnam Civil Actions Medal with palm
- United Nations Korea Medal
- Republic of Vietnam Campaign Medal

== In popular culture ==
Taney is the subject of a 1/300 plastic scale model kit by Revell, released to the market in 1984.
