= Wolfpack Pfeil =

Pfeil ("Arrow") was the name given to two U-boat "wolfpacks" of Nazi Germany during World War II.

== Pfeil I (September 1942) ==
The first wolfpack comprised 11 U-boats and operated from 12 to 22 September 1942 against Convoy ON 129. The gruppe found the convoy but fog and resolute defence by the escorts defeated the U-boats. The fog lifted on the following day and two of the boats spotted escorts but were diverted and the convoy managed to evade the gruppe. On 18 September, Rear-Admiral Karl Dönitz, the Befehlshaber der U-Boote (BdU, Comamnder, U-boats) cancelled the operation.

=== U-boats involved ===
Pfeil I
U-boat	Flag	Commander	Dates	Notes
U-216	Kriegsmarine	Kapitänleutnant Karl-Otto Schultz	15−22 September 1942	
U-221	Kriegsmarine	Kapitänleutnant Hans-Hartwig Trojer	12−22 September 1942	
U-258	Kriegsmarine	Kapitänleutnant Wilhelm von Mässenhausen	12–22 September 1942	
U-356	Kriegsmarine	Kapitänleutnant Georg Wallas	12–22 September 1942	
U-440	Kriegsmarine	Kapitänleutnant Hans Geissler	12–14 September 1942	
U-595	Kriegsmarine	Kapitänleutnant Jürgen Quaet-Faslem	12–22 September 1942	
U-607	Kriegsmarine	Kapitänleutnant Ernst Mengersen	12–22 September 1942	
U-615	Kriegsmarine	Kapitänleutnant Ralph Kapitzky	12–22 September 1942	
U-617	Kriegsmarine	Kapitänleutnant Albrecht Brandi	12–22 September 1942	
U-618	Kriegsmarine	Oberleutnant zur See Kurt Makowski	12–22 September 1942	
U-661	Kriegsmarine	Oberleutnant zur See Erich Lilienfeld	12–22 September 1942	

== Pfeil II (February 1943) ==
The second wolfpack comprised 13 U-boats and operated from 1 to 9 February 1943. This pack attacked Convoy SC 118 that had sailed from New York on 24 January 1943 for Loch Ewe in Scotland. Escort Group B2 (Commander F. B. Proudfoot) with the destroyers HMS Beverley, HMS Vanessa and HMS Vimy, the US Coast Guard cutter USCGC Bibb and the corvettes HMS Campanula and HMS Abelia with the Free French HMS Lobelia and HMS Mignonette and the convoy rescue ship Toward (1,571 GRT). On 2 February 1943, the convoy was about 500 nmi (930 km; 580 mi) to the east-north-east of Newfoundland, in a storm that had scattered the ships over 50 sq mi (130 km^{2}). Gruppe Pfeil was in a line athwart the course of the convoy; U-230 measured a wind speed of 150 mph (240 km/h) and waves supposedly 230 ft (70 m) high. On the night of 4/5 January the convoy passed through the German patrol line unseen. At dawn, 20 nmi (37 km; 23 mi) to the east of the U-boats, someone on the Norwegian Vannik fired a snowflake flare by mistake that was seen on U-187 and reported, the U-boat getting in front of the convoy. The signal was less than twenty seconds long but that was enough for Toward and Bibb to get high-frequency direction finding (Huff-Duff) fixes.

=== U-boats involved ===
Pfeil II
U-boat	Flag	Commander	Dates	Notes
U-89	Kriegsmarine	Korvettenkapitän Dietrich Lohmann	1−9 February 1943	
U-135	Kriegsmarine	Oberleutnant zur See Heinz Schütt	3−8 February 1943	8 February, damaged by B-24 K 120 Squadron
U-187	Kriegsmarine	Kapitänleutnant Ralph Münnich	1–4 February 1943	
U-262	Kriegsmarine	Kapitänleutnant Heinz Franke	1–7 February 1943	Sank 2,864 GRT merchant ship
U-266	Kriegsmarine	Kapitänleutnant Ralf von Jessen	4–9 February 1943	
U-267	Kriegsmarine	Kapitänleutnant Otto Tinschert	17 February 1943	6 February, damaged
U-402	Kriegsmarine	Korvettenkapitän Siegfried von Forstner	1–8 February 1943	7 February, sank 6 ships, 37,075 GRT
U-413	Kriegsmarine	Kapitänleutnant Gustav Poel	1–9 February 1943	Sank straggler, 5,376 GRT
U-454	Kriegsmarine	Kapitänleutnant Burckhard Hackländer	1–9 February 1943	
U-465	Kriegsmarine	Kapitänleutnant Heinz Wolf	1–8 February 1943	
U-594	Kriegsmarine	Kapitänleutnant Friedrich Mumm	1–9 February 1943	
U-608	Kriegsmarine	Kapitänleutnant Rolf Struckmeier	1–9 February 1943	
U-609	Kriegsmarine	Kapitänleutnant Klaus Rudloff	1–7 February 1943	6 February, sunk by HMS Lobelia

=== Raiding success ===
Pfeil II was responsible for the sinking of 11 ships (54,326 GRT), plus one ship damaged (9,272 GRT).

== Bibliography ==
- Blair, Clay (2000) [1998]. Hitler's U-Boat War: The Hunted 1942–1945. Vol. II (pbk. repr. ed.). London: Cassell. ISBN 0-304-35261-6.
- Edwards, Bernard (1999) [1996]. Dönitz and the Wolf Packs: The U-boats at War (repr. Brockhampton Press, London ed.). London: Cassell Military Classics. ISBN 1-86019-927-5.
- Rohwer, Jürgen; Hümmelchen, Gerhard (2005) [1972]. Chronology of the War at Sea, 1939–1945: The Naval History of World War Two (3rd rev. ed.). London: Chatham. ISBN 978-1-86176-257-3.
