= USS Kermanshah =

Cargo ship that served in both World Wars

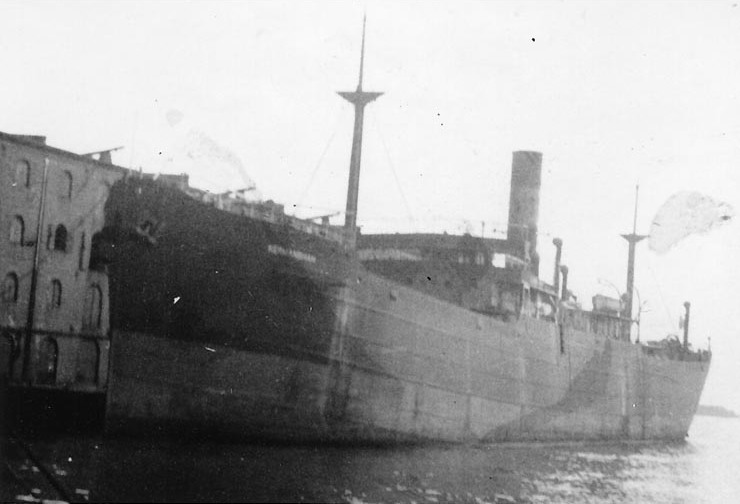
- Kermanshah in about 1918

History
- Name: 1909: Himalaia; 1917: Kermanshah; 1922: Oceana; 1927: Nymphe; 1928: Kalliopi
- Namesake: 1909: Himalayas; 1917: Kermanshah; 1927: Nymph; 1928: Calliope
- Owner: 1910: Himalaia SS Co, Ltd; 1917: Kerr Navigation Corp; 1920: American S&C Corp; 1922: Oceana Sea Nav Co, Ltd; 1927: PN & GN Lykiardopulo; 1928: DJ Pateras & Sons
- Operator: 1910:D Tripcović; 1918: US Navy
- Port of registry: 1910: (Austria-Hungary) Trieste; 1917: (United States) New York; 1922: (Hungary) Budapest; 1927: (Greece) Argostoli; 1927: (Greece) Chios
- Builder: Northumberland Sb Co, Howdon
- Yard number: 167
- Launched: 13 December 1909
- Completed: January 1910
- Acquired: for US Navy, 1 August 1918
- Commissioned: into US Navy, 3 August 1918
- Decommissioned: from US Navy, 5 March 1919
- Identification: code letters HKNM; 1917: US official number 215401; 1917: code letters LHPM; 1918: Naval Registry ID-1473; 1922: code letters JZBK; by 1930: code letters JGKC; by 1934: call sign SWGT
- Fate: sunk by torpedo, 7 February 1943

General characteristics
- Type: cargo steamship
- Tonnage: 4,948 GRT, 3,152 NRT
- Length: 390.0 ft (118.9 m)
- Beam: 52.5 ft (16.0 m)
- Draft: 26 ft 7 in (8.10 m)
- Depth: 27.1 ft (8.3 m)
- Decks: 1
- Installed power: 1 × triple-expansion engine, 2,100 ihp, 415 NHP
- Propulsion: 1 × screw
- Speed: 9.5 knots (18 km/h)
- Complement: in US Navy: 84
- Crew: in WW2: 34, plus 2 DEMS gunners
- Armament: in US Navy: 1 × 4-inch/50-caliber gun; 1 × 6-pounder gun; in WW2: 1 × 4 in (100 mm) naval gun; 4 × machine guns
- Notes: sister ship: Gerania

USS Kermanshah (ID-1473) was a cargo steamship. She was launched in England in 1909 as Himalaia for an Austro-Hungarian shipping company. The US interned her in 1914. In 1917 the US seized her, and sold her to the Kerr Navigation Corporation, who renamed her Kermanshah. The United States Navy requisitioned her in 1918, and commissioned her as USS Kermanshah. She was decommissioned in and returned to her owner in 1919. The American Shipping and Commerce Corporation acquired her in 1920. A Hungarian company bought her in 1922, and renamed her Oceana. Two Greek shipowners bought her in 1927, and renamed her Nymphe. Another Greek shipowner acquired her in 1928, and renamed her Kalliopi. In the Second World War, she carried sugar, iron ore, grain, steel, lumber, and other cargo to the UK. A German U-boat sank her in the Battle of the Atlantic in 1943, killing three members of her crew.

== Gerania and Himalaia ==
In 1909, the Northumberland Shipbuilding Company at Howdon, on the River Tyne in North East England, built a pair of sister ships for Diodato Tripcović, a shipowner in Trieste, which then was part of Austria-Hungary. Yard number 166 was launched on 2 September as Gerania, and completed that October. Yard number 167 was launched on 13 December 1909 as Himalaia, and completed in January 1910.

Himalaia's length was 390.0 ft (118.9 m), her beam was 52.5 ft (16.0 m), her depth was 27.1 ft (8.3 m), and her draft was 26 ft 7 in (8.10 m). She was described as having "lofty" 'tween decks, "so arranged that cattle, troops, or emigrants may be carried if necessary". Her tonnages were 4,948 GRT and 3,152 NRT. She had a single screw, which was driven by a three-cylinder triple-expansion engine, built by the North East Marine Engineering Company of Newcastle. It was rated at 415 NHP, or 2,100 ihp, and gave her a speed of 9.5 knots (18 km/h).

Tripcović created single-ship companies to own some of his ships. The Himalaia Steamship Company owned Himalaia, but Tripcović managed her. He registered her at Trieste, and her code letters were HKNM.

== Internment ==
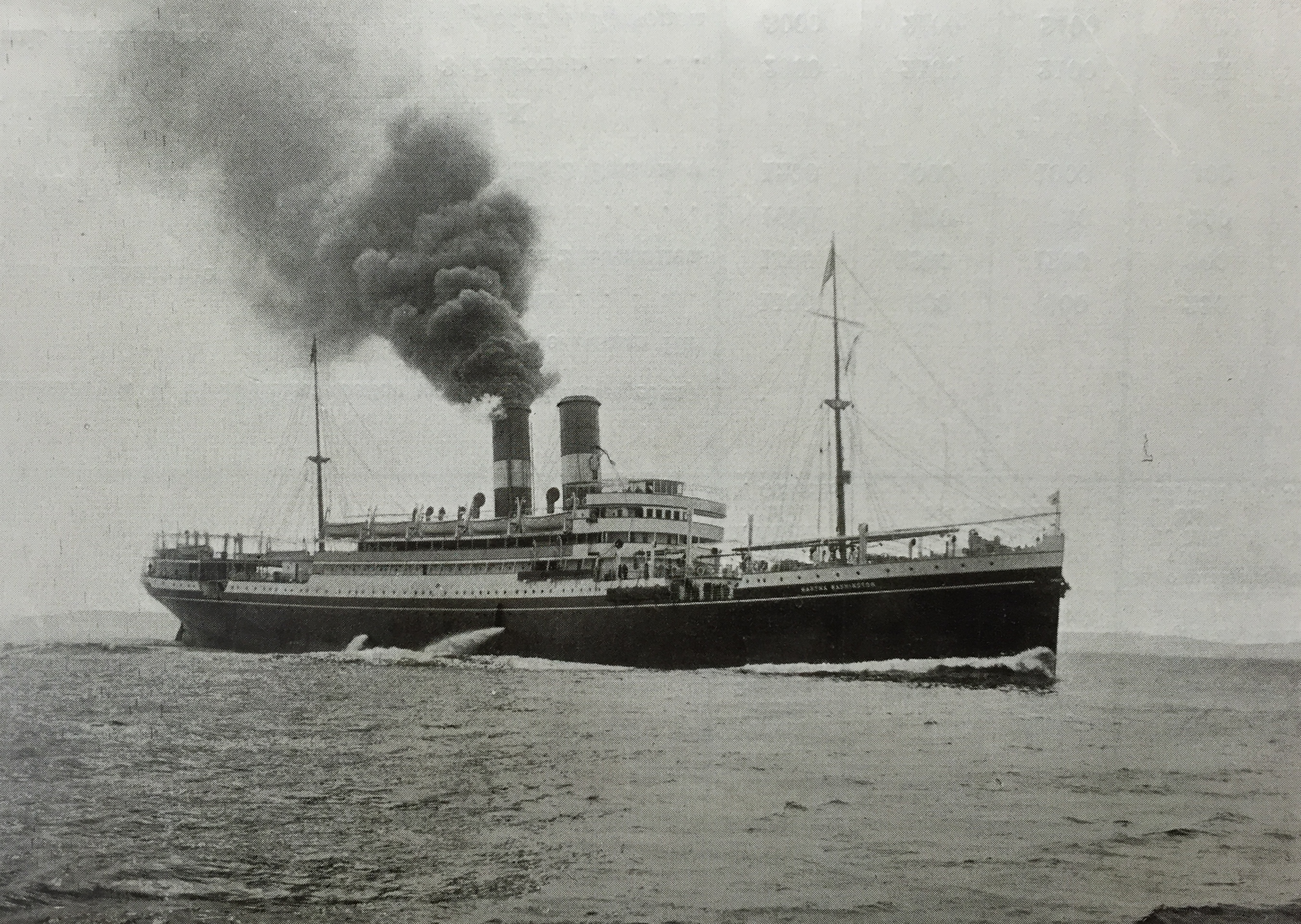
The liner Martha Washington in 1913

When the First World War began in August 1914, Germany and Austria-Hungary ordered their merchant ships to return home if possible, or otherwise take shelter in a neutral port. Himalaia sheltered in New York. Three other Austro-Hungarian merchant ships were interned either in New York, or on the New Jersey side of the Hudson River. They all belonged to Unione Austriaca; and were the ocean liner Martha Washington, and cargo ships Dora and Ida.

A total of 14 Austro-Hungarian merchant ships took refuge in US ports. Among them were another two of Tripcović's ships: Campania, in Galveston; and Franconia, in Philadelphia.

After the sinking of RMS Lusitania on 7 May 1915, there was a risk of war between the US and the Central Powers. The US feared that, were war to begin, the crews of German and Austro-Hungarian ships in US ports might try to scuttle their ships. On 12 May, the United States Coast Guard Cutters Guide and Hudson took 50 inspectors of the United States Customs Service Neutrality Squad to search the Hamburg America Line ships moored at Hoboken, New Jersey, looking for explosives that could be used as scuttling charges. The next day, the force inspecting the ships at Hoboken increased to 70 inspectors. They were due to start inspecting German and Austro-Hungarian ships at South Brooklyn on 14 May.

By February 1917, Himalaia was moored in Newark Bay, and had been there for about a month. On 3 February, just after diplomatic relations between the US and Germany were broken off, George Lamb, Deputy Collector of the Port of New York, boarded her in his capacity as head of the Neutrality Squad. He reported to the Collector, Dudley Field Malone, that the cylinder heads of her main engine had been removed, her crankshafts had been disconnected, and pieces of iron had been dropped into her machinery.

== Seizure ==
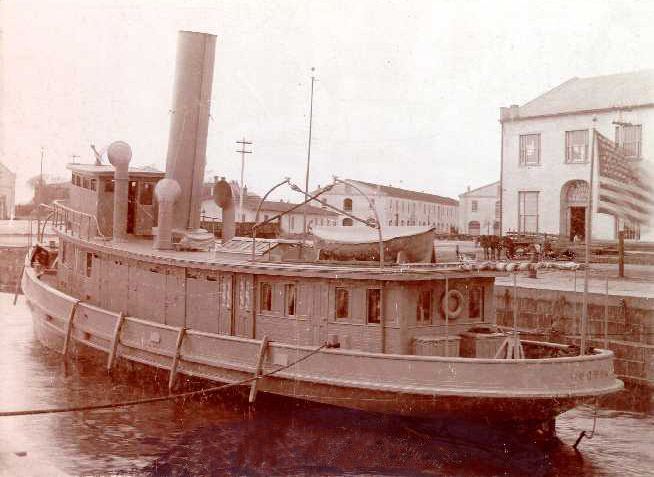
USCGC Hudson

On 6 April 1917, the US declared war against Germany, and seized all 91 German ships in its ports. The US did not declare war against Austria-Hungary, so the 14 Austro-Hungarian ships in US ports were not seized. However, two days later, Austria-Hungary terminated diplomatic relations with the US, so the US responded by seizing all of those Austro-Hungarian ships. at 11:55 hrs on 9 April, Collector Malone sent 80 armed US Customs guards, commanded by Deputy Collector Lamb, aboard two US Coast Guard Cutters, to Stapleton, Staten Island, where they seized Martha Washington. They then seized Dora and Ida, which were moored at the foot of 27th Street. Finally, Lamb and his men, aboard the cutter Hudson, seized Himalaia, which was still in Newark Bay. By then, Himalaia's Master, Captain Scioletić, retained a skeleton crew of only six men. When the Customs officers seized the ship, only three of the men were aboard; the other three were ashore. The crews of all four Austro-Hungarian ships were interned, and taken to Ellis Island.

== Kermanshah ==
By August 1917, the Kerr Navigation Corporation had bought Himalaia. She was one of eight Austro-Hungarian cargo ships that Kerr bought; with a combined tonnage of almost 57,000 GRT; for a total of $12 million. Kerr renamed its acquisitions, and registered them in New York. Himalaia became Kermanshah, after the city of Kermanshah, in Iran. She was given the US official number 215401, and code letters LHPM. By 15 August, those ships which had been damaged by their crews had been repaired, and Kerr was using them in transatlantic trade.

On 1 August 1918, Kermanshah was in New York, when the US Navy requisitioned her. She was commissioned that same day as USS Kermanshah, with the Naval Registry Identification Number 1473, and Lieutenant Commander SW Hickey, USNRF, as her commanding officer. She was defensively armed with one 4-inch/50-caliber gun, and one 6-pounder gun. She loaded Army supplies; on 17 August she left New York in convoy; and on 3 September she reached Bordeaux. She arrived back in New York on 24 September, and left again for Bordeaux on 12 October. She made two further round trips between New York and ports in France. On 5 February 1919, the United States Shipping Board (USSB) announced that it was releasing seven merchant ships from requisition, including Kermanshah. On 13 February, she reached New York from Nantes carrying a cargo of munitions. On 5 March she was decommissioned and transferred to the USSB, who returned her to her owner that same day.

In the latter part of 1920, Kermanshah sailed from Hamburg to Rio de Janeiro, where she arrived on 14 October. By 21 October 1920, the American Shipping and Commerce Corporation (United American Lines) had acquired ten Kerr ships, including Kermanshah. The ships continued a weekly cargo service between Hamburg and New York, and also a service between Hamburg and the Río de la Plata, via ports in Brazil. On 5 February 1921, she left Hamburg for Buenos Aires. On 11 October 1921, she arrived in Buenos Aires from Rio de Janeiro. On 17 November 1921, she left Buenos Aires for Hamburg.

== Hungarian and Greek ownership ==
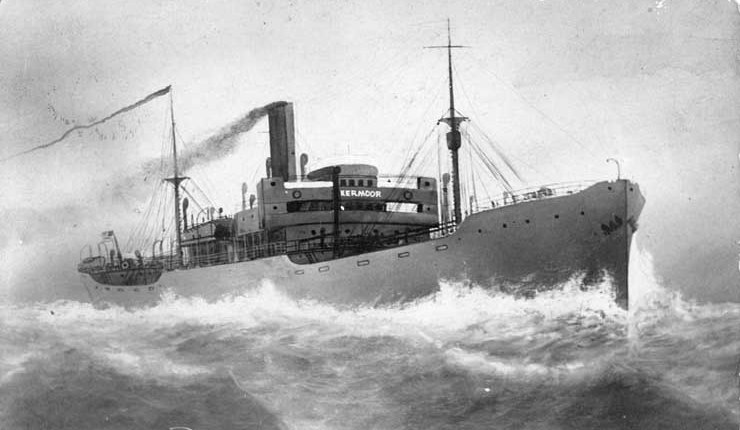
Kermoor, one of seven ships that Oceana bought in 1922

On 7 February 1922, it was announced that the Oceana Sea Navigation Co, Ltd, had bought seven former Austro-Hungarian merchant ships from the American Shipping and Commerce Corporation. Kermanshah was one of them; along with Keresaspa, Kerkenna, Kermoor, Mount Seward (formerly Keresan), Mount Sterling (formerly Kerowlee), and Mount Summit (formerly Kerlew). Oceana renamed the ships, and registered them in Budapest. Kermanshah became Oceana. Her code letters were JZBK.

In 1927, members of the Lykiardopulo family bought Oceana, renamed her Nymphe, and registered her in Argostoli, on the Ionian island of Cephalonia. PN and GN Lykiardopulo owned her, and ND Lykiardopulo managed her.

In the second half of 1927, or first half of 1928, Diamantis J Pateras acquired Nymphe, renamed her Kalliopi, and registered her in Chios. By 1930, her code letters were JGKC. By 1934, her call sign was SWGT, and this had superseded her code letters.

== Second World War ==
On 12 June 1940, Kalliopi left Verdon in France as part of Convoy 64X to Casablanca. From Casablanca, she continued unescorted via Dakar and Cape Verde to Sagua and Antilla in Cuba, where she loaded a cargo of sugar. From Cuba she sailed to Sydney, Nova Scotia, where she joined Convoy SC 5. SC 5 was bound for Liverpool, but in UK waters Kalliopi detached, and on 5 October she arrived in Newport, South Wales.

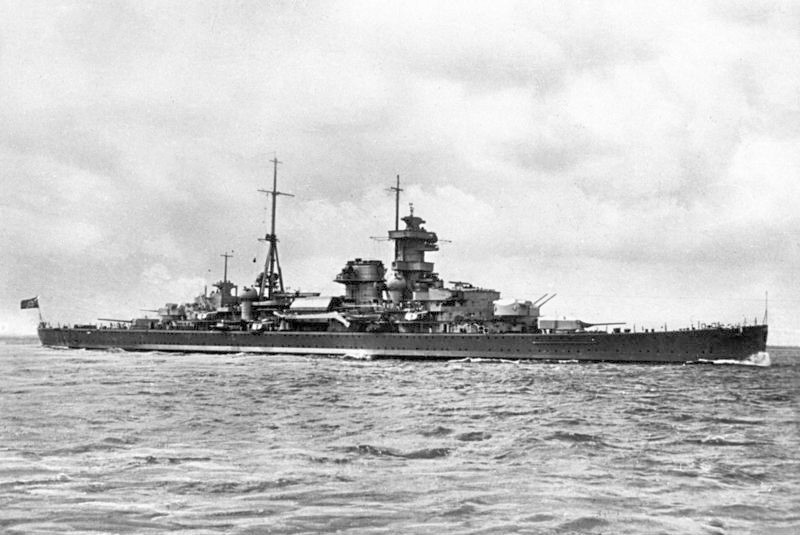
The German cruiser Admiral Hipper

On 26 October 1940, Kalliopi sailed from Newport to Barry. Two days later, Italy tried to invade Greece, which ended Greece's neutrality in the war. On 3 November, Kalliopi left Milford Haven to join Convoy OB 239, but the convoy turned back, and on 8 November arrived off Oban in the Firth of Lorn. Two days later, the convoy re-started from Oban as OB 239/1, and on 14 October it dispersed at sea. Kalliopi continued unescorted to Santos and Rio de Janeiro in Brazil. She returned with a cargo of iron ore via Freetown, Sierra Leone, where she joined Convoy SL 64S. On 12 February 1941, the German cruiser Admiral Hipper attacked SL 64S, sinking seven ships, so the convoy dispersed. Kalliopi survived, and continued unescorted to Gibraltar, where she joined Convoy HG 55. This was bound for Liverpool, but in UK waters Kalliopi detached, and on 21 March 1941 arrived in Belfast Lough.

On 31 March 1941, Kalliopi left Belfast Lough for Holyhead. From there, she continued to Cardiff, Barry, and Milford Haven. On 6 April, while Kalliopi was en route from Holyhead to Cardiff, Germany began its invasion of Greece. From Milford Haven, Kalliopi joined Convoy OB 321, which dispersed at sea. She continued unescorted via Bathurst (now Banjul) in Gambia, and Freetown to Lagos. On 1 June, while she was in Bathurst, the last Allied forces on Crete surrendered to the German invaders. Kalliopi returned via Accra and Takoradi to Freetown, where she joined Convoy SL 83. This was bound for Liverpool, but in UK waters Kalliopi detached, and on 29 August arrived in the Firth of Lorn off Oban. From there she continued around the coast of Britain via Convoy WN 174 as far as the Firth of Forth off Methil, and then Convoy FS 583. FS 583 was bound for the Thames Estuary, but Kalliopi detached off the coast of Yorkshire, and on 4 September arrived in Hull.

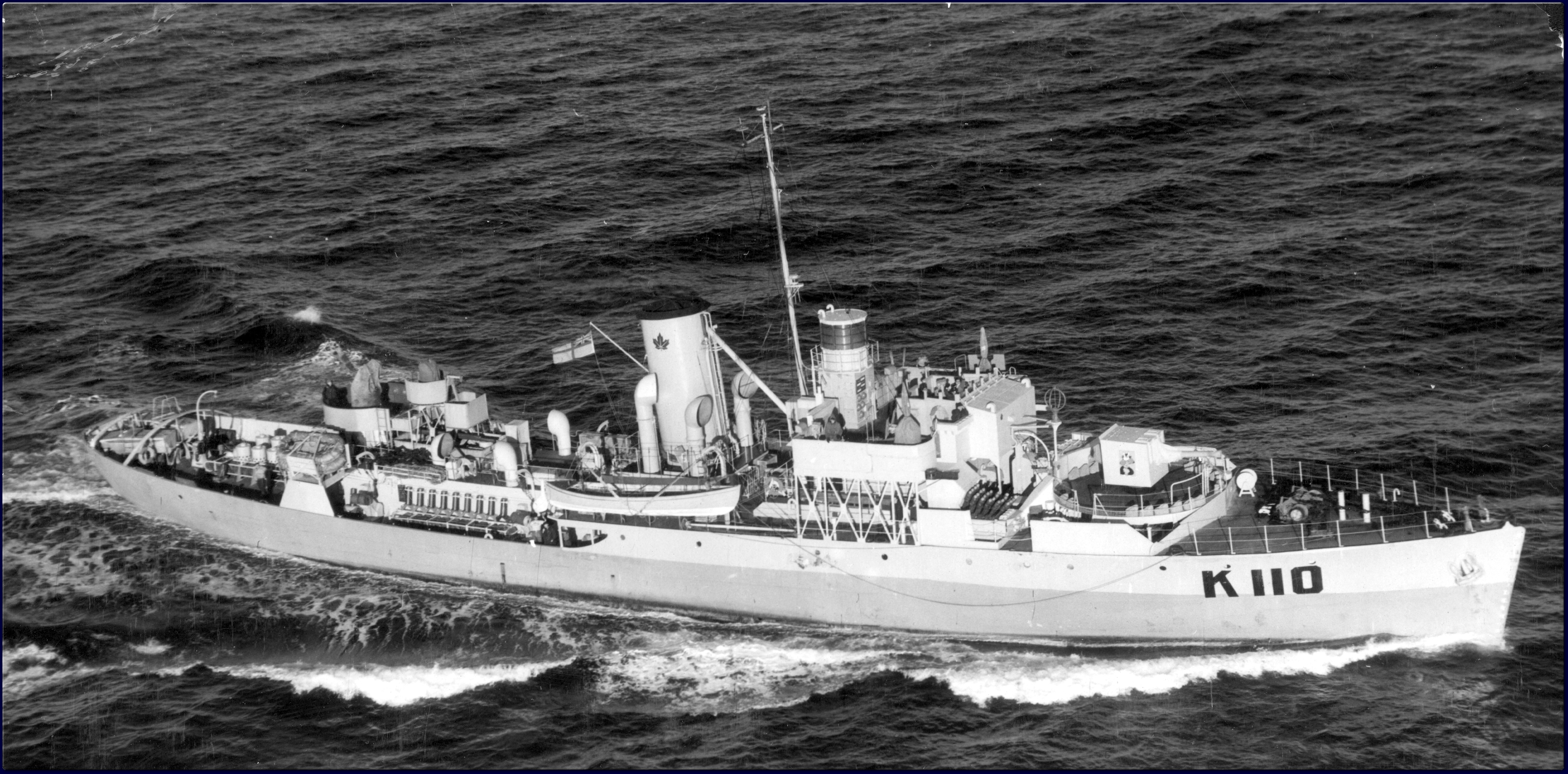
The Canadian destroyer HMCS Skeena

From September 1941, Kalliopi worked exclusively in the North Atlantic. On 15 September, she left Hull, and joined Convoy EC 75, which was en route from the Thames Estuary to the Firth of Clyde. Kalliopi detached for Loch Ewe, whence she joined Convoy ON 19 from Liverpool. ON 19 dispersed at sea, and Kalliopi continued to Montreal. She loaded a cargo of wheat, and returned via Sydney, where she left on 10 November with Convoy SC 54. SC 54's escorts included two Royal Canadian Navy ships: the corvette HMCS Battleford and minesweeper Nipigon. Two days later, they were reinforced by a flotilla that included the Canadian destroyer HMCS Skeena, and corvettes Brandon, HMCS Camrose and Shediac; plus the French corvette Aconit. The coastal convoys WN 211 and FS 662 took her from Loch Ewe via the Firth of Forth to Hull, where she arrived on 4 December 1941.

On 15 December 1941, Kalliopi left Hull. She used coastal convoys FN 581 and EN 24 to get as far as the Firth of Lorn, but then crossed the Atlantic unescorted via Halifax, Nova Scotia to Saint John, New Brunswick. She returned via Halifax and Convoy SC 70 with a cargo of grain, And in UK waters she joined coastal convoys WN 255 and FS 758 to reach the River Tyne, where she arrived on 24 March 1942.

On 8 April 1942, Kalliopi left the Tyne. She used coastal convoys FN 676 and EN 69 to reach the Firth of Lorn, whence she joined Convoy OB 86, which was sailing from Liverpool to Cape Cod. In Canadian waters, Kalliopi detached for Halifax, where she arrived on 29 April. From Halifax, she sailed to Sydney, and then spent the next three months in coastal trade, shuttling between Sydney and Pointe-au-Père, Quebec. On 1 September 1942, she left Sydney for St. John's, Newfoundland. Between then and January 1943, she frequented Botwood, Wabana, St. John's, Sydney, and Halifax.

== Loss ==
On 27 January 1943, Kalliopi left Halifax in Convoy SC 118, carrying a cargo of 6,500 tons of steel and lumber. Her Master was Captain Nicolas Ponticos. Most of her company of 36 men were Greek, but they also included five UK civilians, two UK DEMS gunners, one Canadian stoker, and one Portuguese mess room attendant. She was defensively armed with one 4-inch (100 mm) naval gun, and four machine guns.

On 4 February, U-187 sighted SC 118, and reported its position. The escorts HMS Beverley and Vimy sank the U-boat, and the next day the escort was reinforced by two US Navy destroyers and a US Coast Guard Cutter. On the morning of 7 February, U-402 attacked SC 118, sinking six ships by torpedo. U-402 started at 03:47 hrs (German time) by sinking the British Convoy rescue ship Toward, and at 03:52 hrs, she sank the US tanker Robert E. Hopkins. Between 06:17 and 06:59 hrs, she sank the Norwegian tanker Daghild, British / Danish cargo ship Afrika, and US troopship USS Henry R. Mallory.

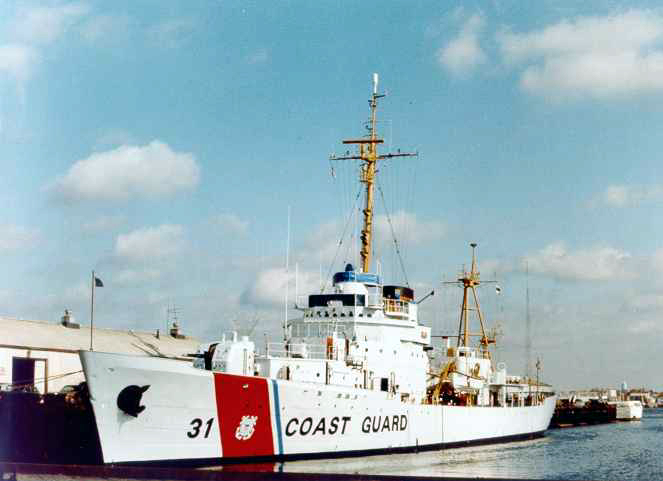
USCGC Bibb, which rescued survivors

At 07:35 hrs, U-402 hit Kalliopi's starboard side with one torpedo just aft of amidships. The explosion raised all of her hatches and ruptured her side plates. The cargo ship settled aft, with a list to port. Two members of her crew and one DEMS gunner were lost; and 31 survivors almost immediately abandoned ship. About 25 minutes after being hit, Kalliopi sank at position 55°27′N 26°8′W. After about an hour, USCGC Bibb rescued the 31 survivors. Bibb was returning to the convoy after rescuing more than 200 survivors from Henry R. Mallory.

== Bibliography ==
- Bureau of Navigation (1918). Fiftieth Annual List of Merchant Vessels of the United States (PDF). Washington, DC: United States Department of Commerce and Labor – via HyperWar.
- Lloyd's Register of British and Foreign Shipping. Vol. I.–Steamers. London: Lloyd's Register of Shipping. 1910 – via Internet Archive.
- Lloyd's Register of Shipping. Vol. II.–Steamers. London: Lloyd's Register of Shipping. 1919 – via Internet Archive.
- Lloyd's Register of Shipping. Vol. II.–Steamers and Motor Vessels. London: Lloyd's Register of Shipping. 1922 – via Internet Archive.
- Lloyd's Register of Shipping. Vol. II.–Steamers and Motorships. London: Lloyd's Register of Shipping. 1927 – via Internet Archive.
- Lloyd's Register of Shipping. Vol. II.–Steamers and Motorships. London: Lloyd's Register of Shipping. 1928 – via Internet Archive.
- Lloyd's Register of Shipping (PDF). Vol. II.–Steamers and Motorships of 300 Tons Gross and Over. London: Lloyd's Register of Shipping. 1930 – via Southampton City Council.
- Lloyd's Register of Shipping (PDF). Vol. II.–Steamers and Motorships of 300 Tons Gross and Over. London: Lloyd's Register of Shipping. 1934 – via Southampton City Council.
