= Convoy SC 118 =

Convoy during naval battles of the Second World War

- Part of Battle of the Atlantic
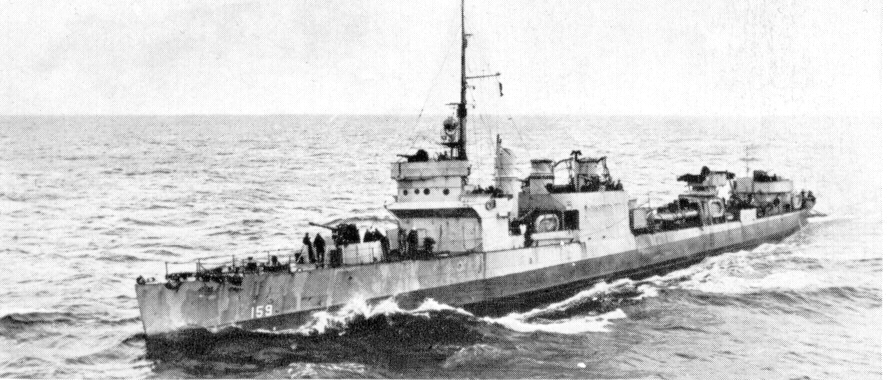
- USS Schenck at sea
Date	4–7 February 1943
Location	North Atlantic

Belligerents
United Kingdom; Canada; United States; Free French	Germany

Commanders and leaders
H. C. C. Forsyth; Proudfoot	Karl Dönitz

Strength
64 freighters; 5 destroyers; 2 cutters; 4 corvettes	20 submarines

Casualties and losses
445 killed; 8 merchant ships sunk (51,592 GRT)	101 killed; 45 POW; 3 submarines sunk; 3 submarines damaged

Convoy SC 118 was the 118th of the numbered series of World War II slow convoys of merchant ships from Sydney, Cape Breton Island, to Liverpool. The ships departed New York City on 24 January 1943 and were met by the Mid-Ocean Escort Force Group B-2 consisting of the Treasury-class cutter Bibb, the Town-class destroyer Beverley, the V-class destroyers Vanessa and Vimy and four Flower-class corvettes, Abelia, Campanula, Lobelia and Mignonette, with the convoy rescue ship Toward.

== Background ==
As western Atlantic coastal convoys brought an end to the "second happy time" off the US coast, Admiral Karl Dönitz, the Befehlshaber der U-Boote (BdU, commander in chief of U-boats) shifted focus to the mid-Atlantic to avoid aircraft patrols. Although convoy routing was less predictable in the mid-ocean, Dönitz anticipated that the increased numbers of U-boats being produced would be able to find convoys with the advantage of intelligence gained through B-Dienst decryption of the British Naval Cypher Number 3. Only 20 per cent of the 180 trans-Atlantic convoys sailing from the end of July 1942 until the end of April 1943 lost ships to U-boat attack.

== Prelude ==
On 2 February U-456 sank three ships from Convoy HX 224. A survivor of one of the sunken ships was picked up by U-632 and told his rescuers a slower convoy was following.

== Battle ==
=== 4 February ===
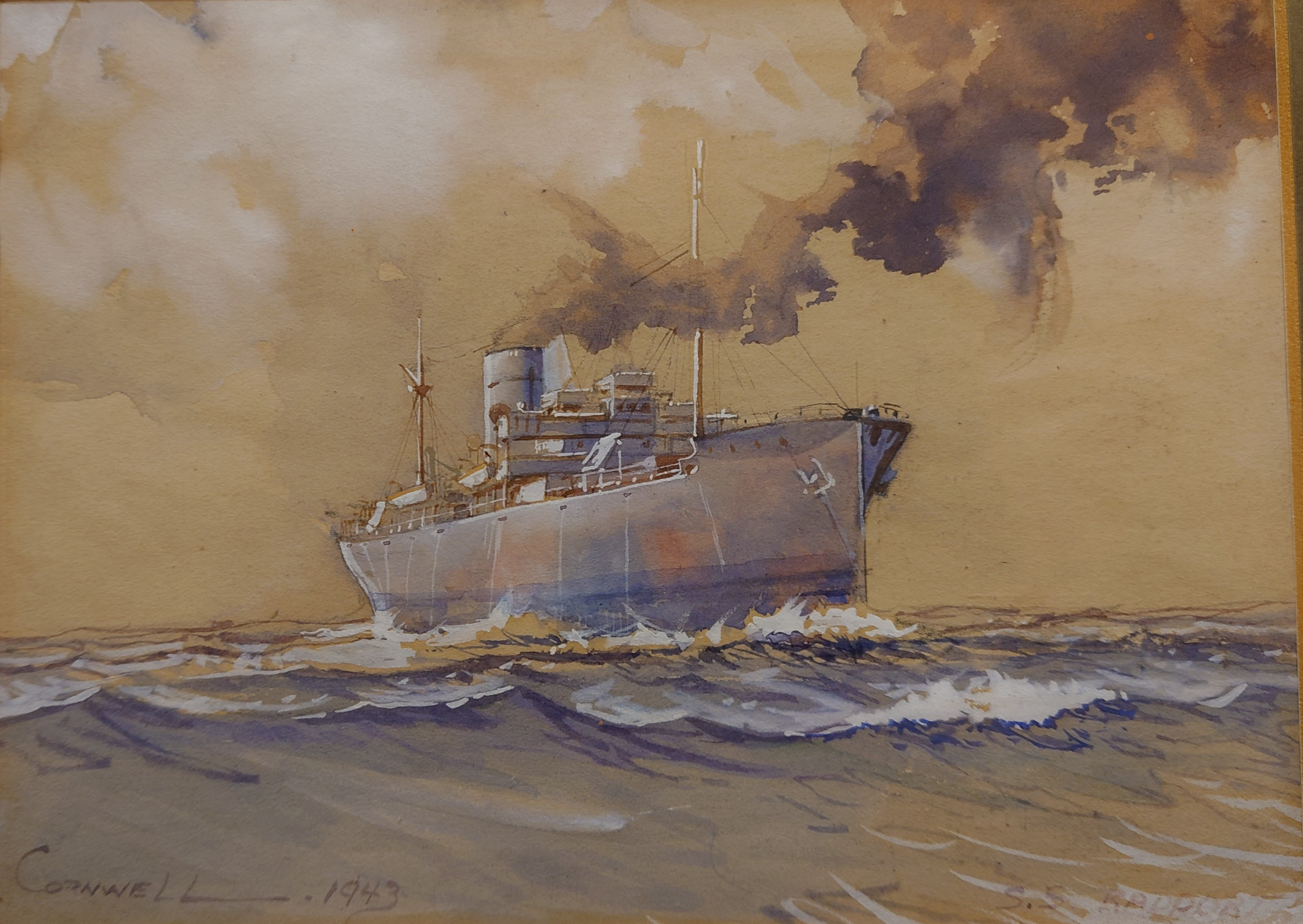
A painting of one the ships in the convoy, SS Radport

A careless merchant seaman of Convoy SC 118 fired a pyrotechnic snowflake projector aboard the Norwegian cargo ship Vannik in the pre-dawn darkness of 4 February. U-187 observed the snowflake display, reported the convoy and was promptly sunk by Beverley and Vimy after Bibb and Toward triangulated the submarine's location from the sighting report, using high-frequency radio direction-finding (HF/DF or Huff-Duff). The destroyers rescued 44 of the submarine's crew. The Polish merchant ship Zagloba was torpedoed on the unprotected side of the convoy by U-262 and U-413 torpedoed the straggling US merchantman West Portal.

=== 5 February ===
The convoy escort was reinforced by the US Coast Guard Treasury class cutter Ingham and the Wickes-class destroyers USS Babbitt and USS Schenck from Iceland. The reinforced escort damaged U-262 and U-267.

=== 7−9 February ===
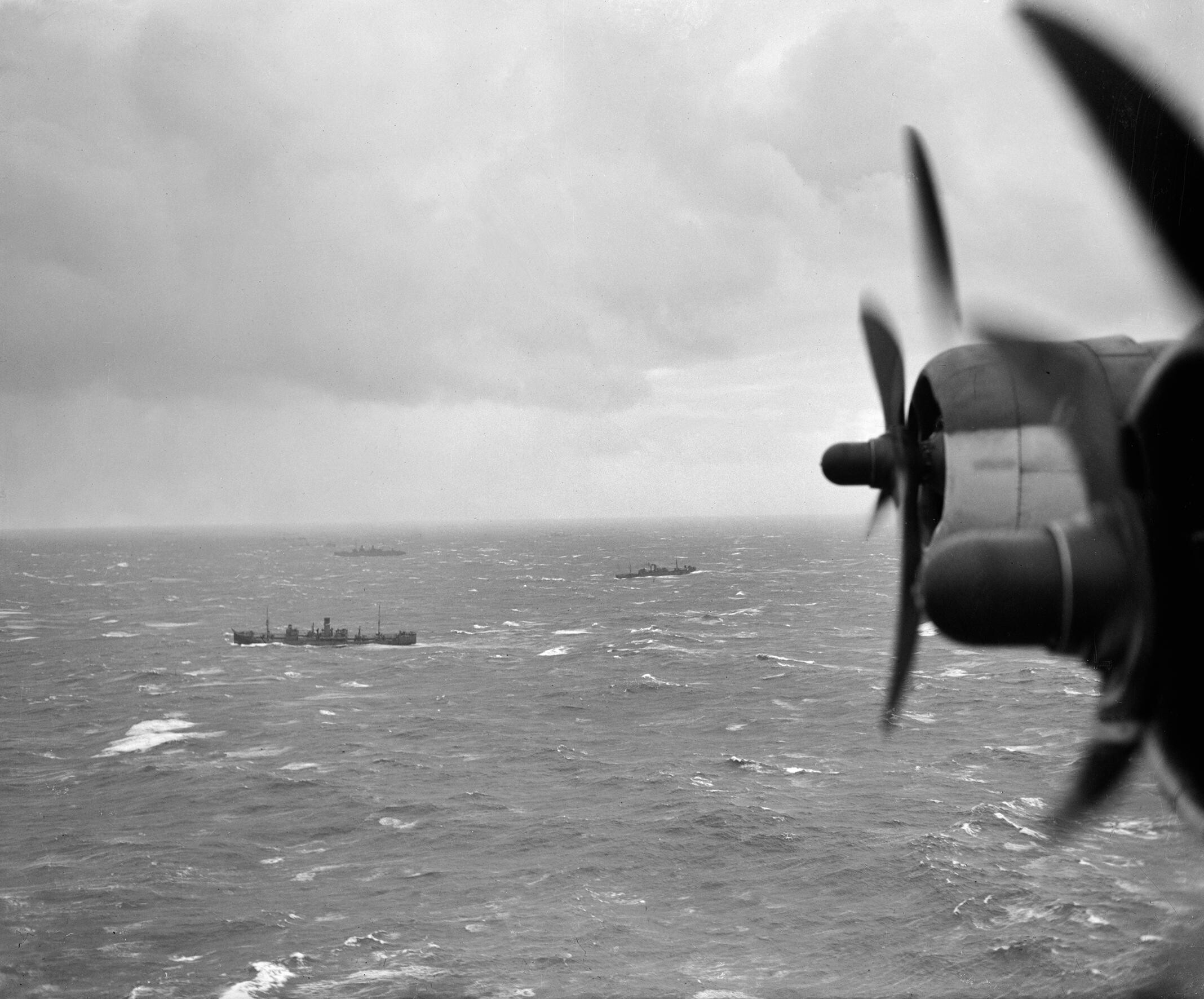
A convoy seen from Liberator X, 120 Squadron, based at Aldergrove

In the pre-dawn hours, U-402 (Kapitänleutnant Siegfried von Forstner) torpedoed the British freighter Afrika, the Norwegian tanker Daghild, the Greek merchant ship Kalliopi, the US tanker Robert E. Hopkins, the cargo liner Henry R. Mallory, and the convoy rescue ship Toward.

Henry R. Mallory was capable of 14 knots (26 km/h; 16 mph) but had been straggling well astern of the convoy for several days and was not zig-zagging, despite its exposed position. Mallory would normally have been assigned to one of the faster HX convoys but there had been no Iceland section of the preceding Convoy HX 224. No commands came from the bridge after Mallory was torpedoed, no flares were sent up, no radio distress message was sent out and no orders were given to abandon ship. There were 272 casualties from Mallory's crew of 77, 34 Navy gunners, and the 136 American soldiers, 172 American sailors and 72 US Marines she was transporting to Iceland.

U-614 sank the British straggler Harmala and Lobelia sank U-609. The B-17 J of 220 Squadron sank U-614 on 7 February. U-402 sank the British merchantman Newton Ash that night. On 9 February, Forstner was awarded the Knight's Cross of the Iron Cross for ships sunk by U-402 from this convoy and from Convoy SC 107 on the previous patrol. Convoy SC 118 reached Liverpool without further loss on 12 February.

== Ships in convoy ==
Merchant ships
Name	Year	Flag	GRT	Notes
Acme	1916	United States	6,878	Petrol, oil
Adamas	1918	Greece	4,144	Steel, lumber; 8 Feb, collided Samuel Huntington, sank, 0†
African Prince	1939	Merchant Navy	8,031	Bauxite, ammunition, Convoy Commodore H. C. C. Forsyth
Afrika	1920	Merchant Navy	8,597	Steel, general cargo, 7 Feb, sunk U-402, 23†
Ann Skakel	1920	United States	4,949	General cargo, detached to Iceland 9 Feb
Arizpa	1920	United States	5,437	Stores
Athelprince	1926	Merchant Navy	8,782	Diesel, naphtha; convoy vice-commodore
Baron Haig	1926	Merchant Navy	3,391	Sugar
Baron Ramsey	1929	Merchant Navy	3,650	Iron ore
Bestik	1920	Norway	2,684	Steel, lumber
Blairdevon	1925	Merchant Navy	3,282	Steel, lumber
Celtic Star	1918	Merchant Navy	5,575	Reefer ship
Cetus	1920	Norway	2,614	Sugar
City of Khios	1925	Merchant Navy	5,574	Sugar
Daghild	1927	Norway	9,272	Diesel, sunk, U-402, U-614, U-608
Dallington Court	1929	Merchant Navy	6,889	Wheat
Danae II	1936	Merchant Navy	2,660	Bauxite
Danby	1937	Merchant Navy	4,281	Linseed, grain
Daylight	1931	United States	9,180	General cargo, escort oiler; detached Iceland 9 Feb
Deido	1928	Merchant Navy	3,894	Petrol
Dettifoss	1930	Iceland	1,564	General cargo, 9 Feb, detached, Iceland
Dordrecht	1928	Netherlands	4,402	Palm oil, returned to Halifax
Empire Gareth	1942	Merchant Navy	2,847	Bauxite
Empire Liberty	1941	Merchant Navy	7,157	General cargo
Glarona	1928	Norway	9,912	Fuel oil, diesel
Gogra	1919	Merchant Navy	5,190	General cargo
Gold Shell	1931	Merchant Navy	8,208	Petrol
Grey County	1918	Norway	5,194	General cargo, 3†
Gulf of Mexico	1917	United States	7,807	Oil, petrol
H M Flagler	1918	Panama	8,208	Furnace fuel oil, escort oiler
Harmala	1935	Merchant Navy	5,730	Iron ore, straggled, sunk U-614 7 Feb, 53†
Helder	1920	Netherlands	3,629	General cargo
USS Henry R. Mallory	1916	United States	6,063	383 passengers & general cargo, 7 Feb, sunk U-402, 272†
Ioannis Frangos	1912	Greece	3,442	Grain
Julius Thomsen	1927	Denmark	1,151	Detached, Greenland
Kalliopi	1910	Greece	4,965	Steel, lumber, 7 Feb, sunk, U-402, 4†
King Stephen	1928	Merchant Navy	5,274	Grain
Kiruna	1921	Sweden	5,484	General cargo
Lagarfoss	1904	Iceland	1,211	General cargo, 9 Feb, detached, Iceland
Makedonia	1942	Greece	7,044	Flour
Mana	1920	Honduras	3,283	General cargo, 9 Feb, detached, Iceland
Maud	1930	Norway	3,189	Sugar
New York City	1917	Merchant Navy	2,710	General cargo
Newton Ash	1925	Merchant Navy	4,625	Grain, mail & military stores, 7 Feb, sunk, U-402, 32†
Norbryn	1922	Norway	5,087	Tea, rubber
Permian	1931	Panama	8,890	
Petter II	1922	Norway	7,417	Gas oil
Polyktor	1914	Greece	4,077	Grain, sunk by U-266
Rådmansü	1914	Sweden	4,280	Sulphur
Radport	1925	Merchant Navy	5,355	General cargo
Redgate	1929	Merchant Navy	4,323	General cargo
Robert E. Hopkins	1921	United States	6,625	Furnace fuel oil, escort oiler, 7 Feb, sunk U-402
Samuel Huntington	1942	United States	7,181	General cargo, Liberty ship
Sheaf Holme	1929	Merchant Navy	4,814	Potash & general cargo
Sommerstad	1926	Norway	5,923	Lubricating oil
Stad Arnhem	1920	Netherlands	3,819	Phosphates
Tilemachos	1911	Greece	3,658	Grain
Toward	1923	Merchant Navy	1,571	Rescue ship, 7 Feb, sunk by U-402, 58†
Vacuum	1920	United States	7,020	Petrol
Vannik	1940	Norway	1,333	General cargo, detached to Iceland 9 Feb
West Portal	1920	United States	5,376	Straggled, 4 Feb, sunk by U-413
William Penn	1921	United States	8,447	Petrol
Yemassee	1922	Panama	2,001	General cargo, 9 Feb, detached, Iceland
Zagloba	1938	Poland	2,864	Ammunition, general cargo, 4 Feb, sunk, U-262

== Allied order of battle ==
=== Convoy escorts ===
Mid-Ocean Escort Force
Name	Flag	Type	Notes
Escort Group B2
HMS Beverley	Royal Navy	Town-class destroyer	
USCGC Bibb	United States	Treasury-class cutter	
HMS Vanessa	Royal Navy	V-class destroyer	
HMS Vimy	Royal Navy	V-class destroyer	
HMS Abelia	Royal Navy	Flower-class corvette	
HMS Campanula	Royal Navy	Flower-class corvette	
FFL Lobélia	Free French Naval Forces	Flower-class corvette	
HMS Mignonette	Royal Navy	Flower-class corvette	
Reinforcements
USCGC Ingham	United States	Treasury-class cutter	
USS Babbitt	United States Navy	Wickes-class destroyer	
USS Schenck	United States Navy	Wickes-class destroyer	

=== Coastal Command ===
Coastal Command squadrons
Sqn	Flag	Group	Type	Notes
120 Squadron	Royal Air Force	15 Group	B-24 Liberator	Very Long Range ASW
206 Squadron	Royal Air Force	15 Group	B-17 Fortress	Very Long Range ASW
220 Squadron	Royal Air Force	15 Group	B-17 Fortress	Very Long Range ASW

== German order of battle ==
=== Wolfpack Pfeil (Arrow) ===
Gruppe Pfeil II
Name	Flag	Class	Notes
U-89	Kriegsmarine	Type VIIC submarine	
U-135	Kriegsmarine	Type VIIC submarine	8 February, damaged, Liberator K, 120 Squadron
U-187	Kriegsmarine	Type IXC/40 submarine	4 February, sunk, Vimy and Beverley
U-262	Kriegsmarine	Type VIIC submarine	
U-266	Kriegsmarine	Type VIIC submarine	
U-267	Kriegsmarine	Type VIIC submarine	5 February, damaged, Vimy
U-402	Kriegsmarine	Type VIIC submarine	
U-413	Kriegsmarine	Type VIIC submarine	
U-438	Kriegsmarine	Type VIIC submarine	
U-454	Kriegsmarine	Type VIIC submarine	
U-456	Kriegsmarine	Type VIIC submarine	
U-465	Kriegsmarine	Type VIIC submarine	
U-594	Kriegsmarine	Type VIIC submarine	
U-608	Kriegsmarine	Type VIIC submarine	
U-609	Kriegsmarine	Type VIIC submarine	6 February, sunk, Lobélia
U-613	Kriegsmarine	Type VIIC submarine	
U-614	Kriegsmarine	Type VIIC submarine	9 February, damaged, Fortress L, 206 Squadron
U-624	Kriegsmarine	Type VIIC submarine	7 February, sunk, Fortress J, 220 Squadron
U-704	Kriegsmarine	Type VIIC submarine	
U-752	Kriegsmarine	Type VIIC submarine	

== See also ==
- Convoy Battles of World War II
