= German submarine U-413 =

German type VII C world war II submarine

Coordinates: 50°21′N 00°01′W

History

Nazi Germany
- Name: U-413
- Ordered: 15 August 1940
- Builder: Danziger Werft, Danzig
- Yard number: 114
- Laid down: 25 April 1941
- Launched: 15 January 1942
- Commissioned: 3 June 1942
- Fate: Sunk on 20 August 1944

General characteristics
- Class & type: Type VIIC submarine
- Displacement: 769 tonnes (757 long tons) surfaced; 871 t (857 long tons) submerged
- Length: 67.10 m (220 ft 2 in) o/a; 50.50 m (165 ft 8 in) pressure hull
- Beam: 6.20 m (20 ft 4 in) o/a; 4.70 m (15 ft 5 in) pressure hull
- Height: 9.60 m (31 ft 6 in)
- Draught: 4.74 m (15 ft 7 in)
- Installed power: 2,800–3,200 PS (2,100–2,400 kW; 2,800–3,200 bhp) (diesels); 750 PS (550 kW; 740 shp) (electric)
- Propulsion: 2 shafts; 2 × diesel engines; 2 × electric motors
- Speed: 17.7 knots (32.8 km/h; 20.4 mph) surfaced; 7.6 knots (14.1 km/h; 8.7 mph) submerged
- Range: 8,500 nmi (15,700 km; 9,800 mi) at 10 knots (19 km/h; 12 mph) surfaced; 80 nmi (150 km; 92 mi) at 4 knots (7.4 km/h; 4.6 mph) submerged
- Test depth: 230 m (750 ft); Crush depth: 250–295 m (820–968 ft)
- Complement: 4 officers, 40–56 enlisted
- Armament: 5 × 53.3 cm (21 in) torpedo tubes (four bow, one stern); 14 × G7e torpedoes; 1 × 8.8 cm (3.46 in) deck gun (220 rounds); 1 × 2 cm (0.79 in) C/30 anti-aircraft guns

Service record
- Part of: 8th U-boat Flotilla; 3 June – 31 October 1942; 1st U-boat Flotilla; 1 November 1942 – 20 August 1944
- Identification codes: M 03 918
- Commanders: Kptlt. Gustav Poel; 3 June 1942 – 19 April 1944; Oblt.z.S. Dietrich Sachse; 20 April – 20 August 1944
- Operations: 7 patrols: 1st patrol: a. 22 – 24 October 1942; b. 28 October – 25 November 1942; 2nd patrol: 27 December 1942 – 17 February 1943; 3rd patrol: 29 March – 13 June 1943; 4th patrol: a. 4 – 5 September 1943; b. 8 – 18 September 1943; c. 27 – 28 September 1943; d. 2 October – 21 November 1943; 5th patrol: 26 January – 27 March 1944; 6th patrol: 6 – 9 June 1944; 7th patrol: 2 – 20 August 1944
- Victories: 5 merchant ships sunk (36,885 GRT); 1 warship sunk (1,100 tons)

German submarine U-413 was a Type VIIC U-boat built for Nazi Germany's Kriegsmarine for service during World War II.

She was laid down on 25 April 1941 at the Danziger Werft (as yard number 114), launched on 15 January 1942 and commissioned on 3 June, with Oberleutnant zur See Gustav Poel in command. Poel commanded her (receiving promotion to Kapitänleutnant), until 19 April 1944, when he was relieved by Oberleutnant zur See Dietrich Sachse who commanded her until her loss. She conducted seven patrols in World War II, sinking six ships totalling 36,885 gross register tons (GRT) and 1,100 tons.

== Design ==
German Type VIIC submarines were preceded by the shorter Type VIIB submarines. U-413 had a displacement of 769 tonnes (757 long tons) when at the surface and 871 tonnes (857 long tons) while submerged. She had a total length of 67.10 m (220 ft 2 in), a pressure hull length of 50.50 m (165 ft 8 in), a beam of 6.20 m (20 ft 4 in), a height of 9.60 m (31 ft 6 in), and a draught of 4.74 m (15 ft 7 in). The submarine was powered by two Germaniawerft F46 four-stroke, six-cylinder supercharged diesel engines producing a total of 2,800 to 3,200 metric horsepower (2,060 to 2,350 kW; 2,760 to 3,160 shp) for use while surfaced, two Siemens-Schuckert GU 343/38–8 double-acting electric motors producing a total of 750 metric horsepower (550 kW; 740 shp) for use while submerged. She had two shafts and two 1.23 m (4 ft) propellers. The boat was capable of operating at depths of up to 230 metres (750 ft).

The submarine had a maximum surface speed of 17.7 knots (32.8 km/h; 20.4 mph) and a maximum submerged speed of 7.6 knots (14.1 km/h; 8.7 mph). When submerged, the boat could operate for 80 nautical miles (150 km; 92 mi) at 4 knots (7.4 km/h; 4.6 mph); when surfaced, she could travel 8,500 nautical miles (15,700 km; 9,800 mi) at 10 knots (19 km/h; 12 mph). U-413 was fitted with five 53.3 cm (21 in) torpedo tubes (four fitted at the bow and one at the stern), fourteen torpedoes, one 8.8 cm (3.46 in) SK C/35 naval gun, 220 rounds, and one 2 cm (0.79 in) C/30 anti-aircraft gun. The boat had a complement of between forty-four and sixty.

== Service history ==
U-413 was one of four Type VIIV submarines ordered from Danziger Werft on 15 August 1940. The submarine was laid down as yard number 114 at Danziger Werft's Danzig shipyard on 25 April 1941, was launched on 15 January 1942 and commissioned on 3 June 1942. U-413, under the command of Kapitänleutnant Gustav Poel, joined the 8th U-boat Flotilla for training, transferring to the operational 1st Flotilla in October 1942.

=== First and second patrols ===
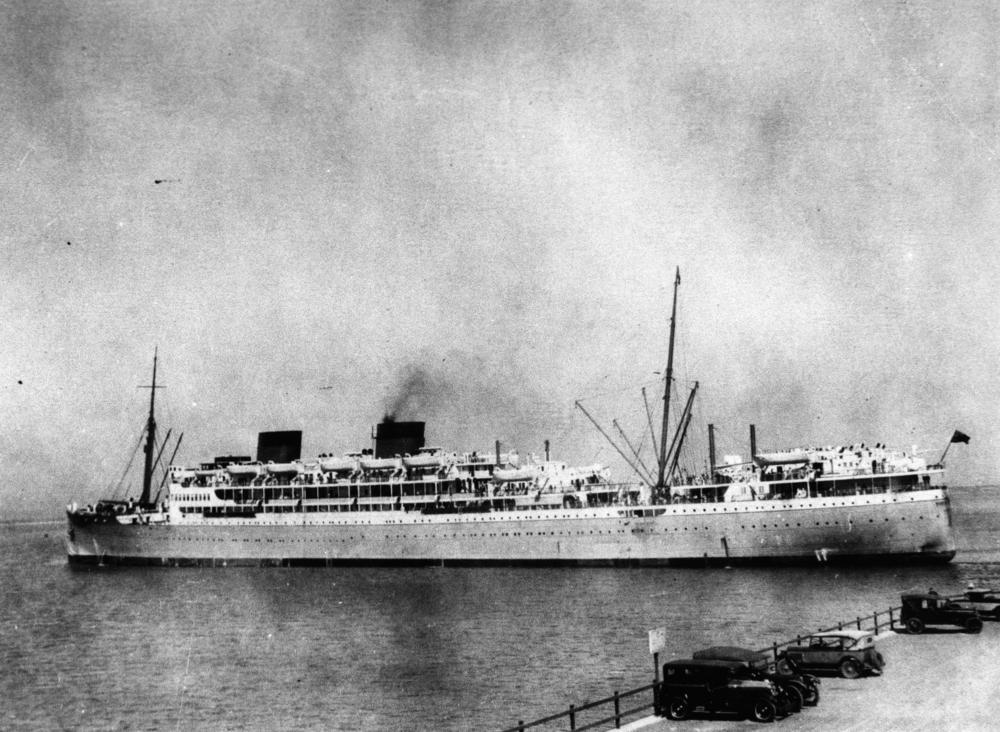
Warwick Castle in 1931

The U-boat departed Kiel on 22 October 1942, on her first patrol, bound for the North Atlantic. On 8 November 1942, Britain and the United States launched Operation Torch, the invasion of French North Africa. In response, all available U-boats in the Atlantic, including U-413, which was still outward bound, were ordered to divert to an area off the Strait of Gibraltar and the coast of Morocco. On 14 November 1942, U-413 encountered a convoy of troopships returning to Britain following Torch, and torpedoed and sank the 20,107 GRT troopship MV Warwick Castle. 114 of Warwick Castle's passengers and crew were killed, with survivors rescued by the destroyers Achates, Vansittart, the corvette HMCS Louisburg and the merchant ship Leinster. On 19 November 1942, U-413 was in pursuit of another convoy when she was caught on the surface by a Lockheed Hudson patrol aircraft of 608 Squadron RAF. The submarine crash dived but the Hudson dropped four depth charges where U-413 had submerged. These wrecked the submarine's periscopes, forcing the patrol to be aborted. U-413 arrived at her new port, Brest in occupied France, on 25 November 1942.

On 27 December 1942, U-413 left Brest on her next patrol. U-413 was ordered to join patrol group Jaguar north east of Newfoundland, arriving on station on 12 January 1943. On 22 January, U-413 spotted Convoy SC 117, south south west of Cape Farewell, sinking the Greek Mount Mycale, a straggler from that convoy, later that day. Radio problems prevented the direction of the rest of group Jaguar against the convoy. The Jaguar group was disbanded on 27 January, with U-413 joining the new group Pfeil. On 4 February, U-187 spotted Convoy SC 118, and sent out a radio contact report that allowed other submarines of group Pfeil to be directed against the convoy. The signal was also detected by escorts from the convoy, resulting in U-187 being sunk. On 5 February, U-413 sank a straggler from the convoy, the American West Portal with all hands. U-413 returned to Brest on 17 February 1943.

=== Third and fourth patrols ===
U-413's third patrol saw her leave Brest on 29 March 1943, once more for the Atlantic. She joined group Miese, patrolling east of Newfoundland, which was positioned to intercept Convoy SC 126, but the convoy evaded the patrol line. The line was then positioned to find Convoy HX 234, which was found by U-306 on 21 April. The group was ordered to attack the convoy, but poor weather and the efforts of the convoys escorts meant that the submarines had little success. On 25 April, U-413 attacked a ship with two torpedoes, hearing what were believed to be the torpedoes detonating at the end of their run. (Note: uboat.net credits this attack with sinking the British steamer Wanstead, which had been torpedoed by U-415 earlier that day, causing her crew to abandon ship, but other sources solely credit U-415.) U-413 then joined patrol group Star and then from 3 May, group Fink, both of which were deployed against Convoy ONS 5, but while the convoy was heavily engaged, with 13 merchant ships sunk for the loss of six U-Boats, U-413 did not claim any successes. After refuelling from the tanker submarine U-461, U-413 joined patrol group Donau 2, south east of Cape Farewell, and was ordered against Convoy SC 130, which was found by U-304 on 18 May, but the strong escort drove off all attacks, with three U-boats sunk with no merchant ships sunk. On 24 May, Admiral Karl Dönitz, commander of the German Navy, ordered the suspension of U-Boat operations against convoys in the North Atlantic owing to high losses with little success. U-413 was one of a number of submarines ordered to remain in the Atlantic, broadcasting radio signals in an attempt to hide the withdrawal of the U-Boats. She returned to Brest on 13 June 1943.

U-413 left Brest on 4 September 1943, bound for the North Atlantic, but returned on 18 September after suffering mechanical problems. She left Brest again on 27 September, returning to port the next day. The submarine left on her next patrol on 2 October 1943. She was fitted with new radio receivers and direction finding gear, with the intention of detecting convoy course changes. U-413 joined Schlieffen group, operating south west of Iceland, and when the group was ordered against Convoys ONS 20 and ON 206, attempted to use her direction-finding gear to track the convoys, but her reports conflicted with direct contact reports, and the convoy escaped, with six U-boats sunk by the convoy's escorts and air attacks. On 24 October U-413 joined Siegfried group, operating east of Newfoundland, but the group found no success, and was split into smaller groups, but they still failed to find any convoys, with operations severely restricted by the presence of allied escort carriers. U-413 returned to Brest on 21 November 1943.

=== Fifth and sixth patrols ===
On 26 January 1944, U-413 left Brest on another patrol. On 11 February, the submarine attacked escorts of Convoy KMS 41, but had no success, and used anti-radar decoys to help escape the response. She then patrolled off the north coast of Cornwall, and after she was sighted by a fishing boat, the British destroyers Warwick and Scimitar were ordered to hunt the submarine. On 20 February 1944, U-413 torpedoed and sank Warwick 20 nmi (23 mi; 37 km) southwest of Trevose Head, Cornwall. In March, U-413 operated south of Ireland, unsuccessfully attacking a convoy on 21 March. She returned to Brest on 27 March. Poel was awarded Knight's Cross of the Iron Cross on arrival. This was Poel's last patrol, with him transferring to the Naval Academy Mürwik in Flensburg. He was replaced by Oberleutnant zur See Dietrich Sachse.

On 6 June 1944, on hearing news of the Allied invasion of Normandy, Hans-Rudolf Rösing, commander of the U-Boats based in France, ordered all available submarines, including U-413, to put out to sea to oppose the invasion. U-Boats like U-413, that were not equipped with schnorkels and so were less able to survive in the face of Allied anti-submarine operations, were ordered to patrol between The Lizard and Hartland Point at the western end of the English Channel. U-413 was attacked by a Handley Page Halifax of 502 Squadron RAF. While anti-aircraft fire from U-413 knocked out one of the Halifax's engines, the Halifax's bombs caused sufficient damage to force U-413 to return to port, reaching Brest on 9 June.

=== Seventh patrol and sinking ===
On 2 August 1944, U-413, now equipped with a schnorkel, set out from Brest to attack invasion shipping between Portsmouth and Beachy Head. On 19 August, the submarine found Convoy ETC 72 off the Isle of Wight, and attacked with acoustic torpedoes, sinking the British steamer Saint Enogat. On 20 August, U-413 was detected by the British destroyer Forester, which together with the destroyers Vidette and Wensleydale, attacked the submarine, with a Hedgehog attack from Vidette causing fatal damage to U-413. One man escaped from U-413, the submarine's chief engineer, Karl Hütterer, who escaped via the submarine's forward torpedo loading hatch, and was picked by Wensleydale. The other 45 of U-413's crew were killed.

The wreck of U-413 was located and identified by marine archaeologist Innes McCartney in 2000 close to the official sinking position.

=== Wolfpacks ===
U-413 took part in 15 wolfpacks, namely:

- Westwall (8 – 19 November 1942)
- Jaguar (10 – 31 January 1943)
- Pfeil (1 – 9 February 1943)
- Adler (11 – 13 April 1943)
- Meise (13 – 27 April 1943)
- Star (27 April – 4 May 1943)
- Fink (4 – 6 May 1943)
- Naab (12 – 15 May 1943)
- Donau 2 (15 – 26 May 1943)
- Schlieffen (14 – 22 October 1943)
- Siegfried (22 – 27 October 1943)
- Siegfried 2 (27 – 30 October 1943)
- Körner (30 October – 2 November 1943)
- Tirpitz 2 (2 – 8 November 1943)
- Eisenhart 8 (9 – 11 November 1943)

== Trivia ==
Neal Stephenson's novel Cryptonomicon features a fictitious U-413, a milchkuh (supply boat).

== Summary of raiding history ==
Date	Ship Name	Nationality	Tonnage (Note: Merchant ship tonnages are in gross register tons. Military vessels are listed by tons displacement.)	Fate
14 November 1942	Warwick Castle	United Kingdom	20,107	Sunk
22 January 1943	Mount Mycale	Greece	3,556	Sunk
5 February 1943	West Portal	United States	5,376	Sunk
21 April 1943	Wanstead	United Kingdom	5,486	Sunk
21 April 1944	HMS Warwick	Royal Navy	1,100	Sunk
19 August 1944	Saint Enogat	United Kingdom	2,360	Sunk

== Bibliography ==
- Blair, Clay (2000). Hitler's U-Boat War: The Hunted 1942–1945. New York: Modern Library. ISBN 0-679-64033-9.
- Busch, Rainer; Röll, Hans-Joachim (1999). German U-boat commanders of World War II : a biographical dictionary. Translated by Brooks, Geoffrey. London, Annapolis, Md: Greenhill Books, Naval Institute Press. ISBN 1-55750-186-6.
- Busch, Rainer; Röll, Hans-Joachim (1999). Deutsche U-Boot-Verluste von September 1939 bis Mai 1945 [German U-boat losses from September 1939 to May 1945]. Der U-Boot-Krieg (in German). Vol. IV. Hamburg, Berlin, Bonn: Mittler. ISBN 3-8132-0514-2.
- Edwards, Bernard (1996). Dönitz and the Wolf Packs - The U-boats at War. Cassell Military Classics. p. 145. ISBN 0-304-35203-9.
- English, John (2019). Grand Fleet Destroyers: Part I: Flotilla Leaders and 'V/W' Class Destroyers. Windsor, UK: World Ship Society. ISBN 978-0-9650769-8-4.
- Gröner, Erich; Jung, Dieter; Maass, Martin (1991). U-boats and Mine Warfare Vessels. German Warships 1815–1945. Vol. 2. Translated by Thomas, Keith; Magowan, Rachel. London: Conway Maritime Press. ISBN 0-85177-593-4.
- Kemp, Paul (1999). U-Boats Destroyed - German Submarine Losses in the World Wars. London: Arms & Armour. ISBN 1-85409-515-3.
- McCartney, Innes (2002). Lost patrols : submarine wrecks of the English Channel. Penzance: Periscope. ISBN 978-1-90438-104-4.
- McCartney, Innes (2015). The Maritime Archaeology of a Modern Conflict: Comparing the Archaeology of German Submarine Wrecks to the Historical Text. Routledge. ISBN 978-1-138-81435-6.
- Niestlé, Axel (2014). German U-Boat Losses During World War II: Details of Destruction. Barnsley, UK: Frontline Books. ISBN 978-1-84832-210-3.
- Rohwer, Jürgen (1983). Axis Submarine Successes 1939–1945. Annapolis, Maryland, US: Naval Institute Press. ISBN 0-87021-082-3.
- Wynn, Kenneth (2003) [1997]. U-Boat Operations of the Second World War: Volume 1: Career Histories, U1—U510. London: Caxton Editions. ISBN 1-84067-525-X.
