= German submarine U-258 =

German World War II submarine

History

Nazi Germany
- Name: U-258
- Ordered: 23 December 1939
- Builder: Bremer Vulkan, Bremen-Vegesack
- Yard number: 23
- Laid down: 20 March 1941
- Launched: 13 December 1941
- Commissioned: 4 February 1942
- Fate: Sunk 20 May 1943 by RAF Liberator

General characteristics
- Class & type: Type VIIC submarine
- Displacement: 769 tonnes (757 long tons) surfaced; 871 t (857 long tons) submerged
- Length: 67.10 m (220 ft 2 in) o/a; 50.50 m (165 ft 8 in) pressure hull
- Beam: 6.20 m (20 ft 4 in) o/a; 4.70 m (15 ft 5 in) pressure hull
- Height: 9.60 m (31 ft 6 in)
- Draught: 4.74 m (15 ft 7 in)
- Installed power: 2,800–3,200 PS (2,100–2,400 kW; 2,800–3,200 bhp) (diesels); 750 PS (550 kW; 740 shp) (electric)
- Propulsion: 2 shafts; 2 × diesel engines; 2 × electric motors
- Speed: 17.7 knots (32.8 km/h; 20.4 mph) surfaced; 7.6 knots (14.1 km/h; 8.7 mph) submerged
- Range: 8,500 nmi (15,700 km; 9,800 mi) at 10 knots (19 km/h; 12 mph) surfaced; 80 nmi (150 km; 92 mi) at 4 knots (7.4 km/h; 4.6 mph) submerged
- Test depth: 230 m (750 ft); Crush depth: 250–295 m (820–968 ft)
- Complement: 4 officers, 40–56 enlisted
- Armament: 5 × 53.3 cm (21 in) torpedo tubes (four bow, one stern); 14 × torpedoes or 26 TMA mines; 1 × 8.8 cm (3.46 in) deck gun (220 rounds); 1 × 2 cm (0.79 in) C/30 anti-aircraft gun

Service record
- Part of: 5th U-boat Flotilla; 4 February – 31 August 1942; 3rd U-boat Flotilla; 1 September 1942 – 20 May 1943
- Identification codes: M 23 837
- Commanders: Oblt.z.S. / Kptlt. Wilhelm von Mässenhausen; 4 February 1942 – 20 May 1943
- Operations: 4 patrols: 1st patrol: 1 September – 27 October 1942; 2nd patrol: 2 – 6 December 1942; 3rd patrol: 10 January – 4 March 1943; 4th patrol: 1 March – 20 May 1943
- Victories: 1 merchant ship sunk (6,198 GRT)

German submarine U-258 was a Type VIIC U-boat of Nazi Germany's Kriegsmarine during World War II. She was laid down at the Bremer Vulkan yard at Bremen-Vegesack on 20 March 1941 as yard number 23. She was launched on 13 December and commissioned on 4 February 1942.

U-258 was sunk by a Royal Air Force Consolidated B-24 Liberator bomber of 120 Squadron in the North Atlantic on 20 May 1943.

== Design ==
German Type VIIC submarines were preceded by the shorter Type VIIB submarines. U-258 had a displacement of 769 tonnes (757 long tons) when at the surface and 871 tonnes (857 long tons) while submerged. She had a total length of 67.10 m (220 ft 2 in), a pressure hull length of 50.50 m (165 ft 8 in), a beam of 6.20 m (20 ft 4 in), a height of 9.60 m (31 ft 6 in), and a draught of 4.74 m (15 ft 7 in). The submarine was powered by two Germaniawerft F46 four-stroke, six-cylinder supercharged diesel engines producing a total of 2,800 to 3,200 metric horsepower (2,060 to 2,350 kW; 2,760 to 3,160 shp) for use while surfaced, two AEG GU 460/8-276 double-acting electric motors producing a total of 750 metric horsepower (550 kW; 740 shp) for use while submerged. She had two shafts and two 1.23 m (4 ft) propellers. The boat was capable of operating at depths of up to 230 metres (750 ft).

The submarine had a maximum surface speed of 17.7 knots (32.8 km/h; 20.4 mph) and a maximum submerged speed of 7.6 knots (14.1 km/h; 8.7 mph). When submerged, the boat could operate for 80 nautical miles (150 km; 92 mi) at 4 knots (7.4 km/h; 4.6 mph); when surfaced, she could travel 8,500 nautical miles (15,700 km; 9,800 mi) at 10 knots (19 km/h; 12 mph). U-258 was fitted with five 53.3 cm (21 in) torpedo tubes (four fitted at the bow and one at the stern), fourteen torpedoes, one 8.8 cm (3.46 in) SK C/35 naval gun, 220 rounds, and one 2 cm (0.79 in) C/30 anti-aircraft gun. The boat had a complement of between forty-four and sixty.

== Wolfpacks ==
U-258 took part in eleven wolfpacks, namely:

- Pfeil (12 – 22 September 1942)
- Blitz (22 – 26 September 1942)
- Tiger (26 – 30 September 1942)
- Wotan (5 – 17 October 1942)
- Delphin (23 January – 9 February 1943)
- Rochen (9 – 20 February 1943)
- Adler (11 – 13 April 1943)
- Meise (13 – 27 April 1943)
- Star (27 April – 4 May 1943)
- Inn (11 – 15 May 1943)
- Donau 1 (15 – 20 May 1943)

== Summary of raiding history ==
Date	Ship Name	Nationality	Tonnage (GRT)	Fate
29 April 1943	McKeesport	United States	6,198	Sunk

== Bibliography ==
- Busch, Rainer; Röll, Hans-Joachim (1999). German U-boat commanders of World War II : a biographical dictionary. Translated by Brooks, Geoffrey. London, Annapolis, Md: Greenhill Books, Naval Institute Press. ISBN 1-55750-186-6.
- Busch, Rainer; Röll, Hans-Joachim (1999). Der U-Boot-Krieg, 1939-1945: Deutsche U-Boot-Verluste von September 1939 bis Mai 1945 [German U-boat losses from September 1939 to May 1945] (in German). Vol. IV. Hamburg, Berlin, Bonn: Mittler. ISBN 3-8132-0514-2.
- Edwards, Bernard (1996). Dönitz and the Wolf Packs - The U-boats at War. Cassell Military Classics. p. 194. ISBN 0-304-35203-9.
- Gröner, Erich; Jung, Dieter; Maass, Martin (1991). U-boats and Mine Warfare Vessels. German Warships 1815–1945. Vol. 2. Translated by Thomas, Keith; Magowan, Rachel. London: Conway Maritime Press. ISBN 0-85177-593-4.
