= German submarine U-262 =

German World War II submarine

History

Nazi Germany
- Name: U-262
- Ordered: 15 August 1940
- Builder: Bremer Vulkan, Bremen-Vegesack
- Yard number: 27
- Laid down: 29 May 1941
- Launched: 10 March 1942
- Commissioned: 15 April 1942
- Fate: Bombed on 19 December 1944; Stricken on 2 April 1945; Broken up in 1947

General characteristics
- Class & type: Type VIIC submarine
- Displacement: 769 tonnes (757 long tons) surfaced; 871 t (857 long tons) submerged
- Length: 67.10 m (220 ft 2 in) o/a; 50.50 m (165 ft 8 in) pressure hull
- Beam: 6.20 m (20 ft 4 in) o/a; 4.70 m (15 ft 5 in) pressure hull
- Height: 9.60 m (31 ft 6 in)
- Draught: 4.74 m (15 ft 7 in)
- Installed power: 2,800–3,200 PS (2,100–2,400 kW; 2,800–3,200 bhp) (diesels); 750 PS (550 kW; 740 shp) (electric)
- Propulsion: 2 shafts; 2 × diesel engines; 2 × electric motors
- Speed: 17.7 knots (32.8 km/h; 20.4 mph) surfaced; 7.6 knots (14.1 km/h; 8.7 mph) submerged
- Range: 8,500 nmi (15,700 km; 9,800 mi) at 10 knots (19 km/h; 12 mph) surfaced; 80 nmi (150 km; 92 mi) at 4 knots (7.4 km/h; 4.6 mph) submerged
- Test depth: 230 m (750 ft); Crush depth: 250–295 m (820–968 ft)
- Complement: 4 officers, 40–56 enlisted
- Armament: 5 × 53.3 cm (21 in) torpedo tubes (four bow, one stern); 14 × torpedoes or 26 TMA mines; 1 × 8.8 cm (3.46 in) deck gun (220 rounds); 1 × 2 cm (0.79 in) C/30 anti-aircraft guns

Service record
- Part of: 5th U-boat Flotilla; 15 April – 30 September 1942; 3rd U-boat Flotilla; 1 October 1942 – 9 November 1944; 33rd U-boat Flotilla; 10 November 1944 – 2 April 1945
- Identification codes: M 45 835
- Commanders: Kptlt. Günther Schiebusch; 15 April – 26 October 1942; Oblt.z.S. Siegfried Atzinger; September – October 1942; Oblt.z.S. / Kptlt. Heinz Franke; 26 October 1942 – 25 January 1944; Oblt.z.S.. Helmut Wieduwilt; 25 January – 24 November 1944; Oblt.z.S. / Kptlt. Karl-Heinz Laudahn; 25 November 1944 – 2 April 1945
- Operations: 10 patrols: 1st patrol: 24 – 28 September 1942; 2nd patrol: 3 – 9 October 1942; 3rd patrol: 5 November – 9 December 1942; 4th patrol: 16 January – 15 February 1943; 5th patrol: 27 March – 25 May 1943; 6th patrol: 24 July – 2 September 1943; 7th patrol: 14 October – 7 December 1943; 8th patrol: 3 February – 29 April 1944; 9th patrol: 6 – 15 June 1944; 10th patrol: 23 August – 5 November 1944
- Victories: 3 merchant ships sunk (13,010 GRT); 1 warship sunk (925 tons)

German submarine U-262 was a Type VIIC U-boat of Nazi Germany's Kriegsmarine during World War II.

The submarine was laid down on 29 May 1941 at the Bremer Vulkan yard at Bremen-Vegesack as yard number 27. She was launched on 10 March 1942 and commissioned on 15 April under the command of Kapitänleutnant Günther Schiebusch.

She was a member of nine wolfpacks, sinking three merchant ships and one warship.

== Design ==
German Type VIIC submarines were preceded by the shorter Type VIIB submarines. U-262 had a displacement of 769 tonnes (757 long tons) when at the surface and 871 tonnes (857 long tons) while submerged. She had a total length of 67.10 m (220 ft 2 in), a pressure hull length of 50.50 m (165 ft 8 in), a beam of 6.20 m (20 ft 4 in), a height of 9.60 m (31 ft 6 in), and a draught of 4.74 m (15 ft 7 in). The submarine was powered by two Germaniawerft F46 four-stroke, six-cylinder supercharged diesel engines producing a total of 2,800 to 3,200 metric horsepower (2,060 to 2,350 kW; 2,760 to 3,160 shp) for use while surfaced, two AEG GU 460/8–27 double-acting electric motors producing a total of 750 metric horsepower (550 kW; 740 shp) for use while submerged. She had two shafts and two 1.23 m (4 ft) propellers. The boat was capable of operating at depths of up to 230 metres (750 ft).

The submarine had a maximum surface speed of 17.7 knots (32.8 km/h; 20.4 mph) and a maximum submerged speed of 7.6 knots (14.1 km/h; 8.7 mph). When submerged, the boat could operate for 80 nautical miles (150 km; 92 mi) at 4 knots (7.4 km/h; 4.6 mph); when surfaced, she could travel 8,500 nautical miles (15,700 km; 9,800 mi) at 10 knots (19 km/h; 12 mph). U-262 was fitted with five 53.3 cm (21 in) torpedo tubes (four fitted at the bow and one at the stern), fourteen torpedoes, one 8.8 cm (3.46 in) SK C/35 naval gun, 220 rounds, and one 2 cm (0.79 in) C/30 anti-aircraft gun. The boat had a complement of between forty-four and sixty.

== Service history ==
=== First and second patrols ===
Having moved from Kiel in Germany to Bergen in Norway in September 1942, U-262's first patrol was marked by an unsuccessful attack by two Lockheed Hudsons, but the damage inflicted was serious enough to warrant an early return to Bergen.

Her second foray followed the Norwegian coast to Narvik but was otherwise uneventful.

=== Third patrol ===
The U-boat sailed from Narvik on 5 November 1942, now under the command of Oberleutnant zur See Heinz Franke, and headed out to the waters east of Newfoundland, sailing first west from Narvik then north, parallel to the eastern Greenland coast; after that turning about, negotiating the Denmark Strait between Greenland and Iceland.

On 18 November, as part of wolfpack Kreuzotter, she attacked the Convoy ONS 144, firing a spread of three torpedoes, one of which hit the Norwegian Flower-class corvette HNoMS Montbretia, fatally damaging the vessel. The commander ordered the crew to abandon ship, U-262 hit her with another torpedo, breaking the ship in two.

She also sank the 7,178 GRT British cargo ship Ocean Crusader, a straggler from Convoy HX 216 northeast of St. John's on 26 November. U-262 arrived at her new home port of La Pallice on the French Atlantic coast on 9 December 1942.

=== Fourth patrol ===
The U-boat departed La Pallice on 16 January 1943 for a patrol out into the mid-Atlantic. On 6 February she fired five torpedoes at a tanker and a steamer, sinking the 2,864 GRT Polish cargo ship Zagloba, 600 nautical miles (1,100 km; 690 mi) east southeast of Cape Farewell (Greenland), a straggler of Convoy SC 118. There were no survivors.

U-262 returned to La Pallice on 15 February.

=== Fifth patrol ===
U-262 sailed again on 27 March 1943 and headed across the Atlantic to Prince Edward Island to pick up German POWs that were to escape from their camp in Operation Elster. On 15 April, while en route, she was shadowing Convoy HX 233, when the U-boat was attacked by depth charges and gunfire from the convoy escorts, forcing her to break off the attack. The U-boat then completed her mission, but no escaped POWs showed up at the rendezvous. She returned to La Pallice on 25 May.

=== Sixth patrol ===
U-262 left La Pallice next on 24 July 1943, commanded by the newly promoted Kapitänleutnant Heinz Franke, and headed across the Atlantic. On 8 August U-262 was waiting to refuel from U-664 while U-760 was being supplied, when a Grumman TBF Avenger/Grumman F4F Wildcat team from the aircraft carrier USS Card located the boats and attacked U-262. While attempting to drop depth charges, the Avenger was hit by flak and caught fire, but managed to drop two charges, severely damaging U-262, before ditching into the sea. The Wildcat was also shot down by U-262 during a strafing run. The damage received forced the U-boat to abort her patrol, she returned home on 2 September.

=== Seventh patrol ===
The U-boat sailed on 14 October 1943 for the waters northeast of the Azores. There she was involved in attacks on three Allied convoys. On 31 October during the attack on SL 138/MKS 28, she sank the Norwegian 2,968 GRT merchant ship Hallfried. Franke's actions in this patrol were marked by efficient shadowing and determined attacks, for which he was awarded the Knight's Cross of the Iron Cross.

U-262 returned to La Pallice on 7 December.

=== Eighth and ninth patrol ===
Under a new commander, Oblt.z.S. Helmut Wieduwilt, U-262 covered the area southwest of Iceland on 3 February 1944, but had no success. She returned home on 29 April after 87 days at sea. U-262's next patrol was similarly uneventful, but lasted only 10 days from 6–15 June. She did not leave the Bay of Biscay. She returned to La Pallice to be fitted with a Schnorchel underwater-breathing apparatus.

=== Tenth patrol ===
After an air raid killed three and wounded one of her crew, the U-boat sailed from La Pallice on 23 August 1944, north to the area south of Iceland, before heading east and south through the North Sea to Flensburg, arriving on 5 November after 75 days.

=== Damage and disposal ===
While at Gotenhafen (Gdynia, Poland) in December 1944 the U-boat was again damaged by bombing. Struck from the active list at Kiel on 2 April 1945, she was broken up in 1947.

== Summary of raiding history ==
Date	Name	Nationality	Tonnage (Note: Merchant ship tonnages are in gross register tons. Military vessels are listed by tons displacement.)	Fate
18 November 1942	HNoMS Montbretia	Royal Norwegian Navy	925	Sunk
26 November 1942	Ocean Crusader	United Kingdom	7,178	Sunk
6 February 1943	Zagloba	Poland	2,864	Sunk
31 October 1943	Hallfried	Norway	2,968	Sunk

== Bibliography ==
- Busch, Rainer; Röll, Hans-Joachim (1999). German U-boat commanders of World War II : a biographical dictionary. Translated by Brooks, Geoffrey. London, Annapolis, Md: Greenhill Books, Naval Institute Press. ISBN 1-55750-186-6.
- Busch, Rainer; Röll, Hans-Joachim (1999). Der U-Boot-Krieg, 1939-1945: Deutsche U-Boot-Verluste von September 1939 bis Mai 1945 [German U-boat losses from September 1939 to May 1945] (in German). Vol. IV. Hamburg, Berlin, Bonn: Mittler. ISBN 3-8132-0514-2.
- Gröner, Erich; Jung, Dieter; Maass, Martin (1991). U-boats and Mine Warfare Vessels. German Warships 1815–1945. Vol. 2. Translated by Thomas, Keith; Magowan, Rachel. London: Conway Maritime Press. ISBN 0-85177-593-4.
