= German submarine U-465 =

German World War II submarine

History

Nazi Germany
- Name: U-465
- Ordered: 15 August 1940
- Builder: Deutsche Werke, Kiel
- Yard number: 296
- Laid down: 17 May 1941
- Launched: 30 March 1942
- Commissioned: 20 May 1942
- Fate: Sunk on 2 May 1943

General characteristics
- Class & type: Type VIIC submarine
- Displacement: 769 tonnes (757 long tons) surfaced; 871 t (857 long tons) submerged
- Length: 67.10 m (220 ft 2 in) o/a; 50.50 m (165 ft 8 in) pressure hull
- Beam: 6.20 m (20 ft 4 in) o/a; 4.70 m (15 ft 5 in) pressure hull
- Height: 9.60 m (31 ft 6 in)
- Draught: 4.74 m (15 ft 7 in)
- Installed power: 2,800–3,200 PS (2,100–2,400 kW; 2,800–3,200 bhp) (diesels); 750 PS (550 kW; 740 shp) (electric)
- Propulsion: 2 shafts; 2 × diesel engines; 2 × electric motors.
- Speed: 17.7 knots (32.8 km/h; 20.4 mph) surfaced; 7.6 knots (14.1 km/h; 8.7 mph) submerged
- Range: 8,500 nmi (15,700 km; 9,800 mi) at 10 knots (19 km/h; 12 mph) surfaced; 80 nmi (150 km; 92 mi) at 4 knots (7.4 km/h; 4.6 mph) submerged
- Test depth: 230 m (750 ft); Crush depth: 250–295 m (820–968 ft)
- Complement: 4 officers, 40–56 enlisted
- Armament: 5 × 53.3 cm (21 in) torpedo tubes (four bow, one stern); 14 × torpedoes or 26 TMA mines; 1 × 8.8 cm (3.46 in) deck gun (220 rounds); 1 × twin 2 cm (0.79 in) C/30 anti-aircraft gun

Service record
- Part of: 8th U-boat Flotilla; 20 May – 30 September 1942; 6th U-boat Flotilla; 1 October 1942 – 2 May 1943
- Identification codes: M 04 059
- Commanders: Kptlt. Heinz Wolf; 20 May 1942 – 2 May 1943
- Operations: 4 patrols: 1st patrol: 16 November – 21 December 1942; 2nd patrol: 16 January – 18 February 1943; 3rd patrol: 7 – 14 April 1943; 4th patrol: 29 April – 2 May 1943
- Victories: None

German submarine U-465 was a Type VIIC U-boat of Nazi Germany's Kriegsmarine during World War II.

She carried out four patrols. She sank no ships.

She was a member of four wolfpacks.

She was sunk by an Australian aircraft in the Bay of Biscay on 2 May 1943.

== Design ==
German Type VIIC submarines were preceded by the shorter Type VIIB submarines. U-465 had a displacement of 769 tonnes (757 long tons) when at the surface and 871 tonnes (857 long tons) while submerged. She had a total length of 67.10 m (220 ft 2 in), a pressure hull length of 50.50 m (165 ft 8 in), a beam of 6.20 m (20 ft 4 in), a height of 9.60 m (31 ft 6 in), and a draught of 4.74 m (15 ft 7 in). The submarine was powered by two Germaniawerft F46 four-stroke, six-cylinder supercharged diesel engines producing a total of 2,800 to 3,200 metric horsepower (2,060 to 2,350 kW; 2,760 to 3,160 shp) for use while surfaced, two Siemens-Schuckert GU 343/38–8 double-acting electric motors producing a total of 750 metric horsepower (550 kW; 740 shp) for use while submerged. She had two shafts and two 1.23 m (4 ft) propellers. The boat was capable of operating at depths of up to 230 metres (750 ft).

The submarine had a maximum surface speed of 17.7 knots (32.8 km/h; 20.4 mph) and a maximum submerged speed of 7.6 knots (14.1 km/h; 8.7 mph). When submerged, the boat could operate for 80 nautical miles (150 km; 92 mi) at 4 knots (7.4 km/h; 4.6 mph); when surfaced, she could travel 8,500 nautical miles (15,700 km; 9,800 mi) at 10 knots (19 km/h; 12 mph). U-465 was fitted with five 53.3 cm (21 in) torpedo tubes (four fitted at the bow and one at the stern), fourteen torpedoes, one 8.8 cm (3.46 in) SK C/35 naval gun, 220 rounds, and one twin 2 cm (0.79 in) C/30 anti-aircraft gun. The boat had a complement of between forty-four and sixty.

== Service history ==
The submarine was laid down on 17 May 1941 at Deutsche Werke in Kiel as yard number 296, launched on 30 March 1942 and commissioned on 20 May under the command of Kapitänleutnant Heinz Wolf.

She served with the 8th U-boat Flotilla from 20 May 1942 for training and the 7th flotilla from 1 October for operations.

=== First patrol ===
U-432's first patrol was preceded by a short journey from Kiel in Germany to Arendal (northeast of Kristiansand) in Norway. The patrol itself began when the boat departed Arendal on 16 November 1942. She passed through the gap separating Iceland and the Faroe Islands and headed for Newfoundland. She arrived at St. Nazaire in occupied France on 21 December.

=== Second patrol ===
The U-boat was attacked by an Allied aircraft in mid-Atlantic on 6 February 1943. The damage sustained was serious enough to force the abandonment of her patrol.

=== Third patrol ===
The boat's third foray was relatively uneventful.

=== Fourth patrol and loss ===
She was attacked and sunk in the Bay of Biscay by an Australian Sunderland flying boat of No. 461 Squadron RAAF on 2 May 1943.

Forty-eight men went down with U-465; there were no survivors.

=== Wolfpacks ===
U-465 took part in four wolfpacks, namely:

- Panzer (23 November – 11 December 1942)
- Raufbold (11 – 12 December 1942)
- Landsknecht (19 – 28 January 1943)
- Pfeil (1 – 8 February 1943)

== Previously recorded fate ==
Sunk on 7 May 1943 in the Bay of Biscay by depth charges from an Australian Sunderland flying boat of No. 10 Squadron RAAF. This attack was on U-663.

== Bibliography ==
- Busch, Rainer; Röll, Hans-Joachim (1999). German U-boat commanders of World War II : a biographical dictionary. Translated by Brooks, Geoffrey. London, Annapolis, Md: Greenhill Books, Naval Institute Press. ISBN 1-55750-186-6.
- Busch, Rainer; Röll, Hans-Joachim (1999). Deutsche U-Boot-Verluste von September 1939 bis Mai 1945 [German U-boat losses from September 1939 to May 1945]. Der U-Boot-Krieg (in German). Vol. IV. Hamburg, Berlin, Bonn: Mittler. ISBN 3-8132-0514-2.
- Edwards, Bernard (1996). Dönitz and the Wolf Packs – The U-boats at War. Cassell Military Classics. p. 197. ISBN 0-304-35203-9.
- Gröner, Erich; Jung, Dieter; Maass, Martin (1991). U-boats and Mine Warfare Vessels. German Warships 1815–1945. Vol. 2. Translated by Thomas, Keith; Magowan, Rachel. London: Conway Maritime Press. ISBN 0-85177-593-4.
- Kemp, Paul (1999). U-Boats Destroyed – German Submarine Losses in the World Wars. London: Arms & Armour. ISBN 1-85409-515-3.
