= German submarine U-614 =

German World War II submarine

History

Nazi Germany
- Name: U-614
- Ordered: 15 August 1940
- Builder: Blohm & Voss, Hamburg
- Yard number: 590
- Laid down: 6 May 1941
- Launched: 29 January 1942
- Commissioned: 19 March 1942
- Fate: Sunk on 29 July 1943 in the North Atlantic in position 46°42′N 11°03′W, by depth charges from an RAF Wellington bomber.

General characteristics
- Class & type: Type VIIC submarine
- Displacement: 769 tonnes (757 long tons) surfaced; 871 t (857 long tons) submerged
- Length: 67.10 m (220 ft 2 in) o/a; 50.50 m (165 ft 8 in) pressure hull
- Beam: 6.20 m (20 ft 4 in) o/a; 4.70 m (15 ft 5 in) pressure hull
- Draught: 4.74 m (15 ft 7 in)
- Installed power: 2,800–3,200 PS (2,100–2,400 kW; 2,800–3,200 bhp) (diesels); 750 PS (550 kW; 740 shp) (electric)
- Propulsion: 2 shafts; 2 × diesel engines; 2 × electric motors
- Speed: 17.7 knots (32.8 km/h; 20.4 mph) surfaced; 7.6 knots (14.1 km/h; 8.7 mph) submerged
- Range: 8,500 nmi (15,700 km; 9,800 mi) at 10 knots (19 km/h; 12 mph) surfaced; 80 nmi (150 km; 92 mi) at 4 knots (7.4 km/h; 4.6 mph) submerged
- Test depth: 230 m (750 ft); Crush depth: 250–295 m (820–968 ft)
- Complement: 4 officers, 40–56 enlisted
- Armament: 5 × 53.3 cm (21 in) torpedo tubes (four bow, one stern); 14 × torpedoes or 26 TMA mines; 1 × 8.8 cm (3.46 in) deck gun (220 rounds); 1 x 2 cm (0.79 in) C/30 AA gun

Service record
- Part of: 8th U-boat Flotilla; 19 March 1942 – 31 January 1943; 6th U-boat Flotilla; 1 February – 29 July 1943
- Identification codes: M 44 065
- Commanders: Oblt.z.S. / Kptlt. Wolfgang Sträter; 19 March 1942 – 29 July 1943
- Operations: 3 patrols: 1st patrol: 9 January – 26 February 1943; 2nd patrol: 12 April – 24 May 1943; 3rd patrol: 25 – 29 July 1943
- Victories: 1 merchant ship sunk (5,730 GRT)

German submarine U-614 was a Type VIIC U-boat built for Nazi Germany's Kriegsmarine for service during World War II. She was laid down on 6 May 1941 by Blohm & Voss, Hamburg as yard number 590, launched on 29 January 1942 and commissioned on 19 March 1942 under Oberleutnant zur See Wolfgang Sträter.

== Design ==
German Type VIIC submarines were preceded by the shorter Type VIIB submarines. U-614 had a displacement of 769 tonnes (757 long tons) when at the surface and 871 tonnes (857 long tons) while submerged. She had a total length of 67.10 m (220 ft 2 in), a pressure hull length of 50.50 m (165 ft 8 in), a beam of 6.20 m (20 ft 4 in), a height of 9.60 m (31 ft 6 in), and a draught of 4.74 m (15 ft 7 in). The submarine was powered by two Germaniawerft F46 four-stroke, six-cylinder supercharged diesel engines producing a total of 2,800 to 3,200 metric horsepower (2,060 to 2,350 kW; 2,760 to 3,160 shp) for use while surfaced, two Brown, Boveri & Cie GG UB 720/8 double-acting electric motors producing a total of 750 metric horsepower (550 kW; 740 shp) for use while submerged. She had two shafts and two 1.23 m (4 ft) propellers. The boat was capable of operating at depths of up to 230 metres (750 ft).

The submarine had a maximum surface speed of 17.7 knots (32.8 km/h; 20.4 mph) and a maximum submerged speed of 7.6 knots (14.1 km/h; 8.7 mph). When submerged, the boat could operate for 80 nautical miles (150 km; 92 mi) at 4 knots (7.4 km/h; 4.6 mph); when surfaced, she could travel 8,500 nautical miles (15,700 km; 9,800 mi) at 10 knots (19 km/h; 12 mph). U-614 was fitted with five 53.3 cm (21 in) torpedo tubes (four fitted at the bow and one at the stern), fourteen torpedoes, one 8.8 cm (3.46 in) SK C/35 naval gun, 220 rounds, and a 2 cm (0.79 in) C/30 anti-aircraft gun. The boat had a complement of between forty-four and sixty.

== Service history ==
The boat's career began with training at 8th U-boat Flotilla on 19 March 1942, followed by active service on 1 February 1943 as part of the 6th Flotilla for the remainder of her service.

In three patrols she sank one merchant ships, for a total of 5,730 gross register tons (GRT).

=== Wolfpacks ===
U-614 took part in six wolfpacks, namely:

- Landsknecht (19 – 28 January 1943)
- Without Name (15 – 18 April 1943)
- Specht (19 April – 4 May 1943)
- Fink (4 – 6 May 1943)
- Elbe (7 – 10 May 1943)
- Elbe 1 (10 – 14 May 1943)

=== Fate ===
U-614 was sunk on 29 July 1943 in the North Atlantic in position 46°42′N 11°03′W, by depth charges from an RAF Wellington bomber of 172 Squadron. All hands were lost.

== Summary of raiding history ==
Date	Ship Name	Nationality	Tonnage (GRT)	Fate
7 February 1943	Harmala	United Kingdom	5,730	Sunk

== Bibliography ==
- Busch, Rainer; Röll, Hans-Joachim (1999). German U-boat commanders of World War II : a biographical dictionary. Translated by Brooks, Geoffrey. London, Annapolis, Md: Greenhill Books, Naval Institute Press. ISBN 1-55750-186-6.
- Busch, Rainer; Röll, Hans-Joachim (1999). Der U-Boot-Krieg, 1939-1945: Deutsche U-Boot-Verluste von September 1939 bis Mai 1945 [German U-boat losses from September 1939 to May 1945] (in German). Vol. IV. Hamburg, Berlin, Bonn: Mittler. ISBN 3-8132-0514-2.
- Edwards, Bernard (1996). Dönitz and the Wolf Packs - The U-boats at War. Cassell. pp. 148, 149. ISBN 0-304-35203-9.
- Gröner, Eric; Jung, Dieter; Maass, Martin (1991). German Warships 1815-1945: U-boats and Mine Warfare Vessels. Vol. 2. Translated by Thomas, Keith; Magowan, Rachel. London: Conway Maritime Press. ISBN 0-85177-593-4.
- Edwards, Bernard (1996). Dönitz and the Wolf Packs - The U-boats at War. Cassell. pp. 148, 149. ISBN 0-304-35203-9.
- Sharpe, Peter (1998). U-Boat Fact File. Great Britain: Midland Publishing. ISBN 1-85780-072-9.
