= German submarine U-267 =

German World War II submarine

History

Nazi Germany
- Name: U-267
- Ordered: 15 August 1940
- Builder: Bremer Vulkan, Bremen-Vegesack
- Yard number: 32
- Laid down: 9 August 1941
- Launched: 23 May 1942
- Commissioned: 11 July 1942
- Fate: Scuttled in Geltinger Bucht on 5 May 1945, later raised and broken up.

General characteristics
- Class & type: Type VIIC submarine
- Displacement: 769 tonnes (757 long tons) surfaced; 871 t (857 long tons) submerged
- Length: 67.10 m (220 ft 2 in) o/a; 50.50 m (165 ft 8 in) pressure hull
- Beam: 6.20 m (20 ft 4 in) o/a; 4.70 m (15 ft 5 in) pressure hull
- Height: 9.60 m (31 ft 6 in)
- Draught: 4.74 m (15 ft 7 in)
- Installed power: 2,800–3,200 PS (2,100–2,400 kW; 2,800–3,200 bhp) (diesels); 750 PS (550 kW; 740 shp) (electric)
- Propulsion: 2 shafts; 2 × diesel engines; 2 × electric motors
- Speed: 17.7 knots (32.8 km/h; 20.4 mph) surfaced; 7.6 knots (14.1 km/h; 8.7 mph) submerged
- Range: 8,500 nmi (15,700 km; 9,800 mi) at 10 knots (19 km/h; 12 mph) surfaced; 80 nmi (150 km; 92 mi) at 4 knots (7.4 km/h; 4.6 mph) submerged
- Test depth: 230 m (750 ft); Crush depth: 250–295 m (820–968 ft)
- Complement: 4 officers, 40–56 enlisted
- Armament: 5 × 53.3 cm (21 in) torpedo tubes (four bow, one stern); 14 × torpedoes or 26 × TMA or 39 × TMB tube-launched mines; 1 × 8.8 cm (3.46 in) deck gun (220 rounds); 2 × 20 mm AA (4,380 rounds)

Service record
- Part of: 8th U-boat Flotilla; 11 July 1942 – 31 January 1943; 7th U-boat Flotilla; 1 February 1943 – 6 July 1944; 33rd U-boat Flotilla; 23 September 1944 – 5 May 1945
- Identification codes: M 13 807
- Commanders: Oblt.z.S. / Kptlt. Otto Tinschert; 11 July 1942 – 13 July 1943; Oblt.z.S. Ernst von Witzendorff; 14 July 1943 – 26 November 1943; Kptlt. Otto Tinschert; 27 November 1943 – 6 July 1944; Oblt.z.S.d.R Bernhard Knieper; 23 September 1944 – 5 May 1945
- Operations: 7 patrols: 1st patrol: 12 January – 18 February 1943; 2nd patrol: 23 March – 21 May 1943; 3rd patrol: a. 4 – 13 July 1943; b. 14 – 16 September 1943; c. 18 – 19 September 1943; d. 22 – 24 September 1943; e. 26 – 28 September 1943; 4th patrol: a. 3 October – 26 November 1943; b. 10 – 13 January 1944; c. 15 – 17 January 1944; d. 20 – 22 January 1944; e. 19 – 21 February 1944; 5th patrol: 26 February – 20 May 1944; 6th patrol: a. 23 September – 29 October 1944; b. 4 – 11 November 1944; 7th patrol: 24 – 28 February 1945
- Victories: None

German submarine U-267 was a Type VIIC U-boat of Nazi Germany's Kriegsmarine during World War II. The submarine was laid down on 9 August 1941 at the Bremer Vulkan yard at Bremen-Vegesack as yard number 32, launched on 23 May 1942 and commissioned on 11 July 1942. She took part in seven patrols between 11 July 1942 and when she was scuttled at the war's end. She neither sank nor damaged any ships. U-267 was scuttled in Geltinger Bucht on 5 May 1945, later raised and broken up.

== Design ==
German Type VIIC submarines were preceded by the shorter Type VIIB submarines. U-267 had a displacement of 769 tonnes (757 long tons) when at the surface and 871 tonnes (857 long tons) while submerged. She had a total length of 67.10 m (220 ft 2 in), a pressure hull length of 50.50 m (165 ft 8 in), a beam of 6.20 m (20 ft 4 in), a height of 9.60 m (31 ft 6 in), and a draught of 4.74 m (15 ft 7 in). The submarine was powered by two Germaniawerft F46 four-stroke, six-cylinder supercharged diesel engines producing a total of 2,800 to 3,200 metric horsepower (2,060 to 2,350 kW; 2,760 to 3,160 shp) for use while surfaced, two AEG GU 460/8-276 double-acting electric motors producing a total of 750 metric horsepower (550 kW; 740 shp) for use while submerged. She had two shafts and two 1.23 m (4 ft) propellers. The boat was capable of operating at depths of up to 230 metres (750 ft).

The submarine had a maximum surface speed of 17.7 knots (32.8 km/h; 20.4 mph) and a maximum submerged speed of 7.6 knots (14.1 km/h; 8.7 mph). When submerged, the boat could operate for 80 nautical miles (150 km; 92 mi) at 4 knots (7.4 km/h; 4.6 mph); when surfaced, she could travel 8,500 nautical miles (15,700 km; 9,800 mi) at 10 knots (19 km/h; 12 mph). U-267 was fitted with five 53.3 cm (21 in) torpedo tubes (four fitted at the bow and one at the stern), fourteen torpedoes, one 8.8 cm (3.46 in) SK C/35 naval gun, 220 rounds, and one twin 2 cm (0.79 in) C/30 anti-aircraft guns. The boat had a complement of between forty-four and sixty.

== Bibliography ==
- Busch, Rainer; Röll, Hans-Joachim (1999). German U-boat commanders of World War II : a biographical dictionary. Translated by Brooks, Geoffrey. London, Annapolis, Md: Greenhill Books, Naval Institute Press. ISBN 1-55750-186-6.
- Busch, Rainer; Röll, Hans-Joachim (1999). Deutsche U-Boot-Verluste von September 1939 bis Mai 1945 [German U-boat losses from September 1939 to May 1945]. Der U-Boot-Krieg (in German). Vol. IV. Hamburg, Berlin, Bonn: Mittler. ISBN 3-8132-0514-2.
- Gröner, Erich; Jung, Dieter; Maass, Martin (1991). U-boats and Mine Warfare Vessels. German Warships 1815–1945. Vol. 2. Translated by Thomas, Keith; Magowan, Rachel. London: Conway Maritime Press. ISBN 0-85177-593-4.
