= USCGC Bibb =

Secretary-Class Coast Guard ship

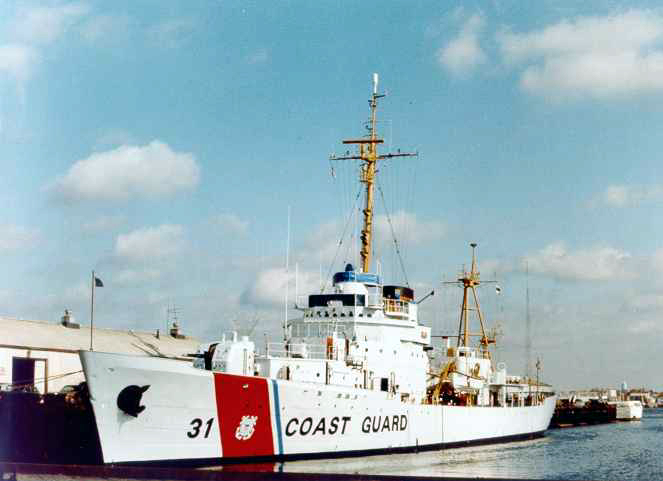
- USCGC Bibb (WPG-31)

History

United States
- Name: Bibb
- Namesake: George M. Bibb
- Builder: Charleston Navy Yard
- Laid down: 15 August 1935
- Launched: 14 January 1937
- Commissioned: 10 March 1937
- Decommissioned: 30 September 1985
- Fate: Sunk as an artificial reef off the Florida Keys on 28 November 1987

General characteristics
- Class & type: Treasury-class cutter
- Displacement: 2,350 (1936)
- Length: 327 ft 0 in (99.67 m)
- Beam: 41 ft 0 in (12.50 m)
- Draft: 12 ft 6 in (3.81 m) (max.)
- Propulsion: 2 × Westinghouse double-reduction geared turbines; 2 × Babcock & Wilcox sectional express, air-encased, 400 psi, 200° superheat 5,250 (total shaft horse power)
- Speed: 19.5 knots (36.1 km/h)
- Range: 13.0 knots, 7,000 mi (11,000 km) range
- Complement: 1937: 12 officers, 4 warrants, 107 enlisted; 1941: 16 officers, 5 warrants, 202 enlisted; 1966: 10 officers, 3 warrants, 133 enlisted.
- Sensors & processing systems: Radar: (1945) SK, SG-1; (1966) AN/SPS-29D, AN/SPA-52.; Fire Control Radar: (1945) Mk-26; (1966) Mk-26 MOD 4; Sonar: (1945) QC series; (1966) SQS-11
- Electronic warfare & decoys: HF/DF: (1943)
- Armament: 1936: 2 × 5 in (127 mm)/51 cal. guns; 2 × 6-pounder guns; 1 × 1-pounder gun; 1966: 1 × 5"/38 caliber gun (single); MK 52 MOD 3 director; 1 × 10-1 Hedgehog; 2 × (P&S) Mk 32 MOD 5 TT; 4 × Mk 44 MOD 1 torpedoes; 2 × .50 cal. M2 Browning MG; 2 × MK-13 high altitude parachute flare mortars.
- Aircraft carried: Curtiss SOC-4, USCG No. V172 (1937–1938); Grumman JF-2, USCG No. V146 (1939–)

USCGC Bibb (WPG-31) was a 327-foot (100 m) Secretary-class (also known as "Treasury class") Coast Guard ship commissioned in 1936. Seven similar "combat cutters" were built and named for secretaries of the United States Treasury. Bibb was named for US Secretary of the Treasury (July 4, 1844 – March 7, 1845) George M. Bibb.

== History ==
Bibb saw service in World War II. The ship fought in the Battle of the Atlantic serving as a convoy escort. In February 1943, the convoy came under attack and the SS Henry R. Mallory was torpedoed. Capt. Raney ignored the order to leave the survivors and went back and rescued 202 men from the icy waters. In 1944 Bibb provided convoy escort between the United States and North Africa — mainly to Bizerte in Tunisia. In January 1945 Bibb left Charleston, South Carolina for service in the Pacific theater where, as an AGC, she served temporarily as the flagship for Commander, Mine Craft, Pacific Fleet. Bibb is credited with destroying one Japanese kamikaze aircraft in action at Karema Retto.

In peacetime the Bibb spent time on ocean station providing weather information and beacons to trans-Atlantic traffic. While on ocean station, the Bibb came to the rescue of the airliner, the Bermuda Sky Queen. In the Vietnam War, the Bibb transported John Kerry after he was shot on his Swift boat.

== Fate ==
Bibb was decommissioned in 1985 and remained docked until it was transported to the Florida Keys for use as an artificial reef. The ship was sunk in November 1987 just outside the coral reef tract, about six miles (10 km) offshore of the island of Key Largo. It lies on its side at a depth of about 130 feet (40 m). Nearby, a second Treasury-class ship, the USCGC Duane (WPG-33) was also sunk as an artificial reef.

The Bibb rests at 24°59.71′N 80°22.77′W.

== Noteworthy crewmembers ==
Among those serving on Bibb was James A. Watson, a rear admiral who was the onsite ranking officer in the Deepwater Horizon oil spill. Watson was an Engineering Officer/Student Engineer (1978–1980).

== World War II convoys escorted ==
Convoy	Escort Group	Dates	Notes
SC 81		5 May 1942	Iceland shuttle
ON 97		13–16 May 1942	Iceland shuttle
SC 84		17 May 1942	Iceland shuttle
SC 85		6 June 1942	Iceland shuttle
ON 106		24–27 June 1942	Iceland shuttle
ON 110		7–11 July 1942	Iceland shuttle
ON 124		24-27 Aug 1942	Iceland shuttle
SC 97		29 Aug-1 Sept 1942	Iceland shuttle
ON 132		21-24 Sept 1942	Iceland shuttle
SC 101		28-30 Sept 1942	Iceland shuttle
ON 140		19-24 Oct 1942	Iceland shuttle
SC 105		25-26 Oct 1942	Iceland shuttle
Convoy SC 107		5-7 Nov 1942	Iceland shuttle
ON 144		8-15 Nov 1942	Iceland shuttle
ON 148		25-28 Nov 1942	Iceland shuttle
Convoy SC 118		1-9 Feb 1943	Iceland shuttle
HX 226		19-20 Feb 1943	Iceland shuttle
ON 169		25-27 Feb 1943	Iceland shuttle
HX 227		1–3 March 1943	Iceland shuttle
Convoy SC 121		9–10 March 1943	Iceland shuttle
Convoys HX 229/SC 122		21–23 March 1943	Iceland shuttle
ON 173		31 March-3 April 1943	Iceland shuttle

== In popular culture ==
USCGC Bibb appeared in the 1952 film Walk East on Beacon at the film's climactic end.
