= HMS Vimy =

Destroyer of the Royal Navy

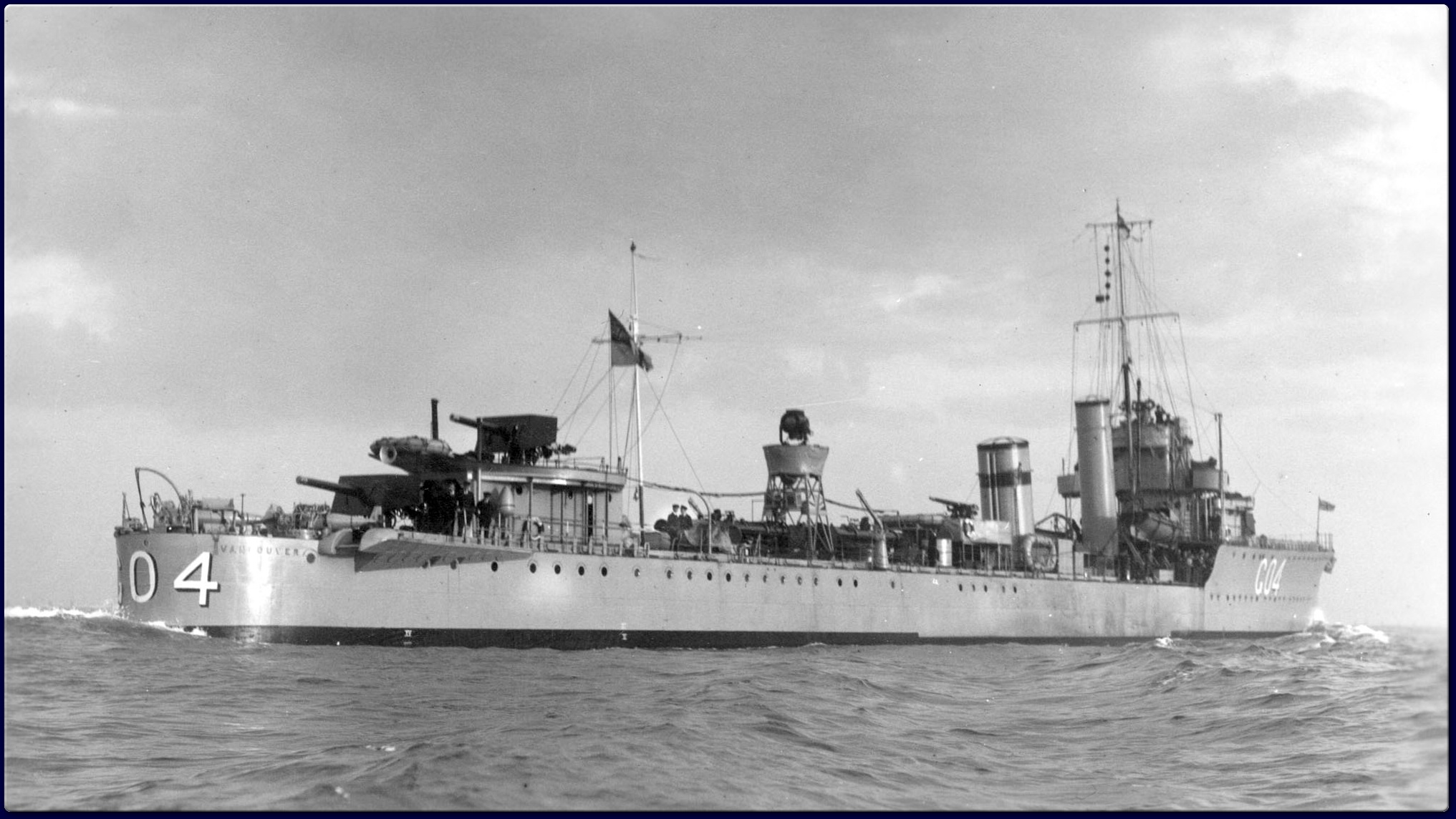
- As HMS Vancouver

History

United Kingdom
- Name: HMS Vancouver
- Builder: William Beardmore and Company
- Launched: 28 December 1917
- Renamed: HMS Vimy in April 1928
- Decommissioned: March 1947
- Honours and awards: Dunkirk 1940; Arctic 1944-5
- Fate: Sold for scrap December 1947

General characteristics (see below)
- Class & type: V-class destroyer
- Armament: 4 QF 4-inch (102-mm) Mk.V L/45 guns, mount P Mk.I; 1 QF 3-inch (76-mm) 20 cwt Mk.I anti-aircraft gun, mount HA Mk.II; 4 (2x2) tubes for 21 inch (533 mm) torpedoes

HMS Vancouver was a British V-class destroyer. She was launched on 28 December 1917; in July 1922 she accidentally rammed the submarine H24. She was renamed HMS Vimy in April 1928. She served with distinction during World War II, earning two battle honours and damaging or sinking three enemy submarines. The Royal Navy retired her in 1945 and she was scrapped in 1948.

== Service history ==
=== Service during World War II ===
In September 1939 she was part of the 11th Destroyer Flotilla. On 6 February 1940, Vimy rescued the sole survivor of a crew of four from an Avro Anson that had crashed into the sea while escorting a convoy.

In May 1940 she participated in the Dunkirk evacuation. Anticipating the need, the Royal Navy had sent 200 seaman and marines aboard Vimy, to organise the port of Boulogne on 23 May. At one point, U-60 fired at her but without result as the torpedoes were faulty. Also on 28 May, small arms fire from the shore fatally wounded Lieutenant Commander Colin Donald, her captain, and killed the officer of the watch, Sub Lieutenant Webster. Lt Cdr Donald was carried below and died in hospital in Dover; the first lieutenant who was summoned from the upper deck, Lieutenant Adrian Northey (DSC, Despatches), took temporary command for two days between 28.05.40 and 30.05.40. Lieutenant Commander Donald's replacement as captain was found to be missing on the second day of the Dunkirk evacuation, and the crew searched the entire vessel for him without result.

On 1 June, Vimy collided with and sank the yacht Amulree in the Gull Channel, to the west of the Goodwin Sands. That same day an air attack caused some damage. During the evacuation of Dunkirk, Vimy transported 2,976 troops; for her efforts she received the battle honours "Dunkirk 1940".

In 1941 she was reconstructed to long range escort, the work being finished in June 1941. On 21 September 1941, depth charges from Vimy damaged the Italian Marconi-class submarine Luigi Torelli, which was attempting to attack Convoy HG 73, west of Gibraltar.

On 3 September 1942, depth charges from the British destroyers Vimy, Pathfinder and Quentin sank the German submarine U-162 in the mid-Atlantic north-east of Trinidad, in position 12°21′N 59°29′W. The U-boat had had a particularly successful year to that point, having sunk 14 vessels totaling 82,000 tons. Vimy's captain, Lieutenant Commander de Chair received the DSC for this action. All but three of the submarine's crew survived to be taken prisoner. Her captain, Jürgen Wattenberg, went on to organize a break from the POW camp at Papago Park, in Arizona.

On 18 September, Vimy rescued survivors from the US merchantman SS West Lashaway, which U-66 had sunk on 30 August.

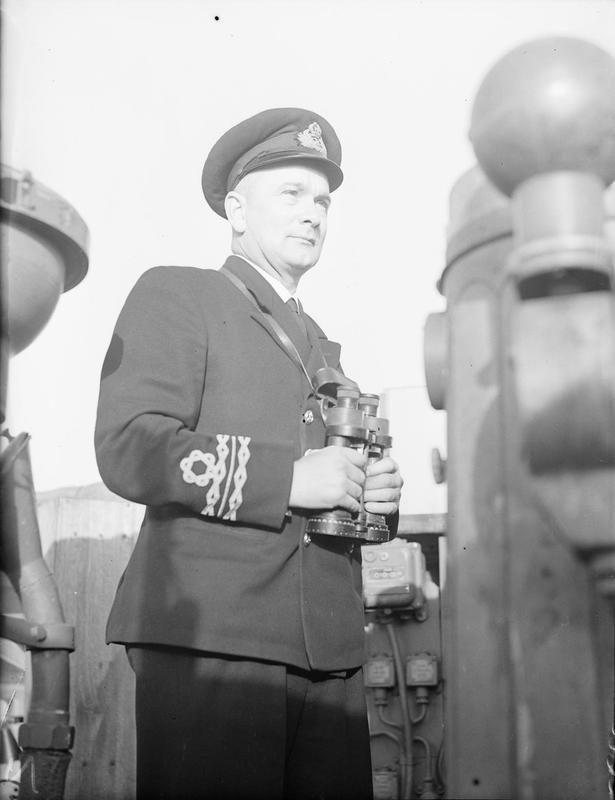
Lieut Commander R B Stannard, VC, during his first trip as commanding officer of HMS Vimy, sunk a U-boat in the North Atlantic, 1943 (IWM A15013)

On 4 February 1943, Vimy and the destroyer Beverley, using HF/DF, located U-187, which was shadowing Convoy SC 118 in the North Atlantic, south of Greenland at the exit of the Baffin Bay. Depth charges from the two destroyers sank the submarine 966 km (600 mi) south-east of Cape Farewell, Greenland. U-187 was on her first cruise and had not had any successes. Nine of her crew members perished, including the commander, during the sinking, but Vimy and Beverley rescued 45 men from the water. Her commanding officer, Lt Cdr R B Stannard VC, received a DSO for Vimy's contribution to breaking up the U-boat pack hunting SC 118.

== Fate ==
Vimy was no longer listed as an active unit in the July 1945 Navy List. She was sold for scrap in March 1947 and was scrapped at Rosyth by Metal Industries in February 1948.

== Bibliography ==
- Campbell, John (1985). Naval Weapons of World War II. Annapolis, Maryland: Naval Institute Press. ISBN 0-87021-459-4.
- Chesneau, Roger, ed. (1980). Conway's All the World's Fighting Ships 1922–1946. Greenwich, UK: Conway Maritime Press. ISBN 0-85177-146-7.
- Colledge, J. J.; Warlow, Ben (2006) [1969]. Ships of the Royal Navy: The Complete Record of All Fighting Ships of the Royal Navy from the 15th Century to the Present (3rd Rev ed.). London: Chatham Publishing. ISBN 978-1-86176-281-8. OCLC 67375475.
- Cocker, Maurice. Destroyers of the Royal Navy, 1893–1981. Ian Allan. ISBN 0-7110-1075-7.
- Friedman, Norman (2009). British Destroyers From Earliest Days to the Second World War. Annapolis, Maryland: Naval Institute Press. ISBN 978-1-59114-081-8.
- Gardiner, Robert & Gray, Randal, eds. (1985). Conway's All the World's Fighting Ships 1906–1921. Annapolis, Maryland: Naval Institute Press. ISBN 0-85177-245-5.
- Lenton, H. T. (1998). British & Empire Warships of the Second World War. Annapolis, Maryland: Naval Institute Press. ISBN 1-55750-048-7.
- March, Edgar J. (1966). British Destroyers: A History of Development, 1892–1953; Drawn by Admiralty Permission From Official Records & Returns, Ships' Covers & Building Plans. London: Seeley Service. OCLC 164893555.
- Preston, Antony (1971). 'V & W' Class Destroyers 1917–1945. London: Macdonald. OCLC 464542895.
- Raven, Alan & Roberts, John (1979). 'V' and 'W' Class Destroyers. Man o'War. Vol. 2. London: Arms & Armour. ISBN 0-85368-233-X.
- Rohwer, Jürgen (2005). Chronology of the War at Sea 1939–1945: The Naval History of World War Two (Third Revised ed.). Annapolis, Maryland: Naval Institute Press. ISBN 1-59114-119-2.
- Whinney, Bob (2000). The U-boat Peril: A Fight for Survival. Cassell. ISBN 0-304-35132-6.
- Whitley, M. J. (1988). Destroyers of World War 2. Annapolis, Maryland: Naval Institute Press. ISBN 0-87021-326-1.
- Winser, John de D. (1999). B.E.F. Ships Before, At and After Dunkirk. Gravesend, Kent: World Ship Society. ISBN 0-905617-91-6.
