= USS Branch (DD-197) =

Clemson-class destroyer

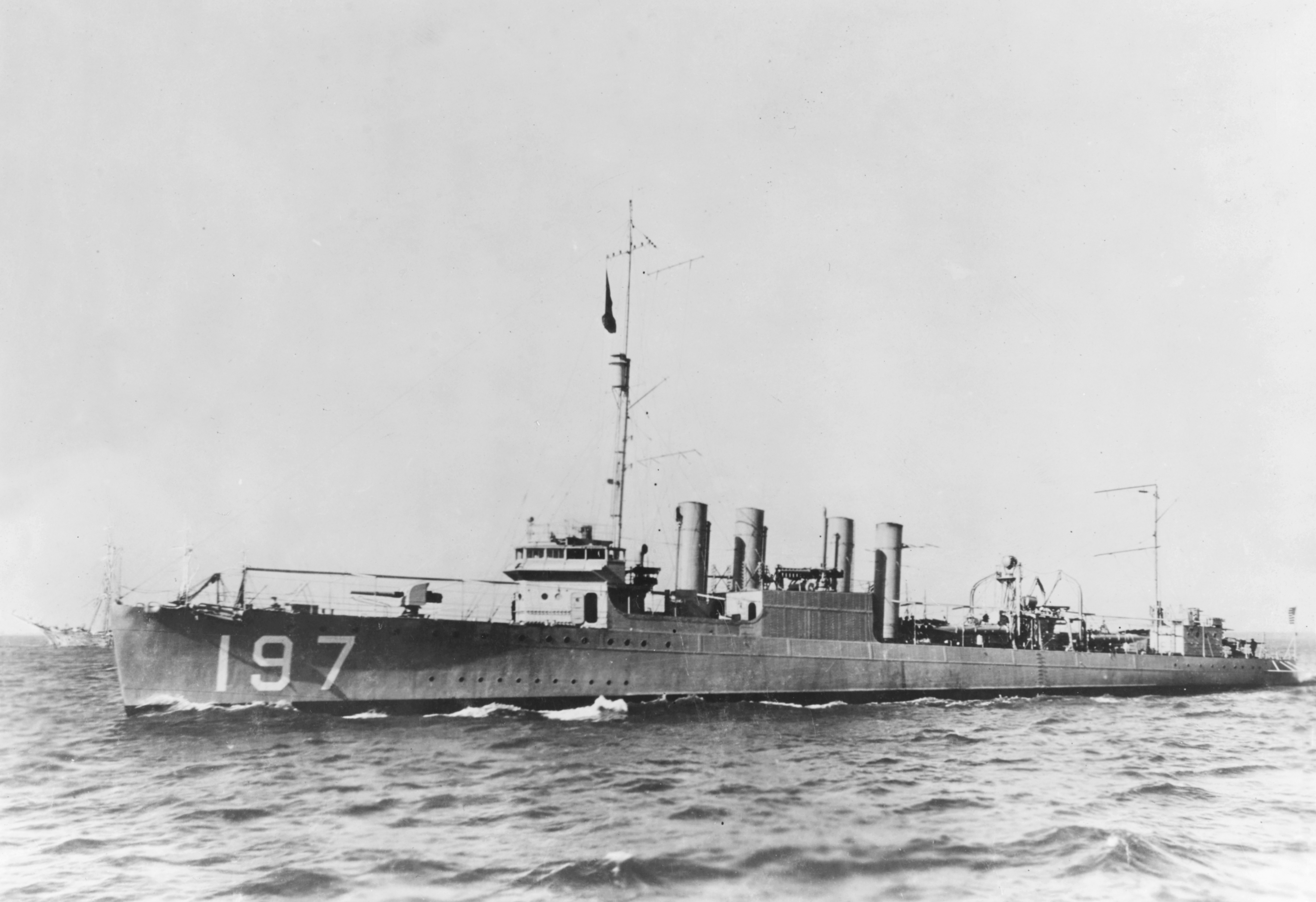
- USS Branch underway, ca. 1920.

History

United States
- Namesake: John Branch
- Builder: Newport News Shipbuilding & Dry Dock Company
- Cost: $1,143,689.68 (hull & machinery)
- Laid down: 25 October 1918
- Launched: 19 April 1919
- Commissioned: 26 July 1920
- Decommissioned: 11 August 1922
- Recommissioned: 4 December 1939
- Decommissioned: 8 October 1940
- Stricken: 8 January 1941
- Fate: Transferred to United Kingdom, 8 October 1940

United Kingdom
- Name: HMS Beverley
- Acquired: 8 October 1940
- Commissioned: 8 October 1940
- Identification: Pennant number: H64
- Fate: Torpedoed and sunk 11 April 1943

General characteristics
- Class & type: Clemson-class destroyer
- Displacement: 1,215 tons
- Length: 314 ft 4 in (95.81 m)
- Beam: 31 ft 9 in (9.68 m)
- Draft: 9 ft 10 in (3.00 m)
- Propulsion: 26,500 shp (19,800 kW); geared turbines, 2 screws
- Speed: 35 kn (65 km/h; 40 mph)
- Range: 4,900 nmi (9,100 km; 5,600 mi) at 15 kn (28 km/h; 17 mph)
- Complement: 122 officers and enlisted
- Armament: 4 × 4 in (102 mm)/50 guns; 1 × 3 in (76 mm)/23 gun; 12 × 21 inch (533 mm) torpedo tubes

USS Branch (DD-197) was a Clemson-class destroyer in the United States Navy that entered service in 1920. After a short active life, Branch was placed in reserve in 1922. The ship was activated again for World War II before being transferred to the Royal Navy in 1940. Renamed HMS Beverley, the destroyer served in the Battle of the Atlantic as a convoy escort and was torpedoed and sunk on 11 April 1943.

== Construction and commissioning ==
The second Navy ship was named for Secretary of the Navy John Branch (1782–1863), Branch was launched on 19 April 1919 by Newport News Shipbuilding & Dry Dock Company; sponsored by Miss Laurie O'Brien Branch, grandniece of Secretary Branch. The destroyer was commissioned on 26 July 1920.

== Service history ==
=== United States Navy service ===
Branch was fitted out at Norfolk Navy Yard and in October cruised to Annapolis, Maryland, for a test of her engineering performance. Before the end of 1920 she joined Destroyer Squadron 3, Atlantic Fleet. The next year she maneuvered with the Squadron and engaged in tactical exercises on the Atlantic coast, sometimes operating in reduced commission with half her usual complement of crew. After 6 January 1922 she operated in the vicinity of Charleston, South Carolina, and Hampton Roads. Arriving at Philadelphia Navy Yard in June, she was placed out of commission 11 August 1922.

Branch remained inactive at Philadelphia until recommissioned 4 December 1939 for service with the Scouting Force. As flagship of Destroyer Division 68 she participated in the Neutrality Patrol. In the summer of 1940 she operated along the United States East Coast and trained reserves. Early in October 1940 she departed Newport, Rhode Island for Halifax, Nova Scotia, where on 8 October 1940 Branch was decommissioned and transferred under the Destroyers for Bases Agreement to the United Kingdom for service in the Royal Navy and renamed HMS Beverley.

=== Royal Navy service ===
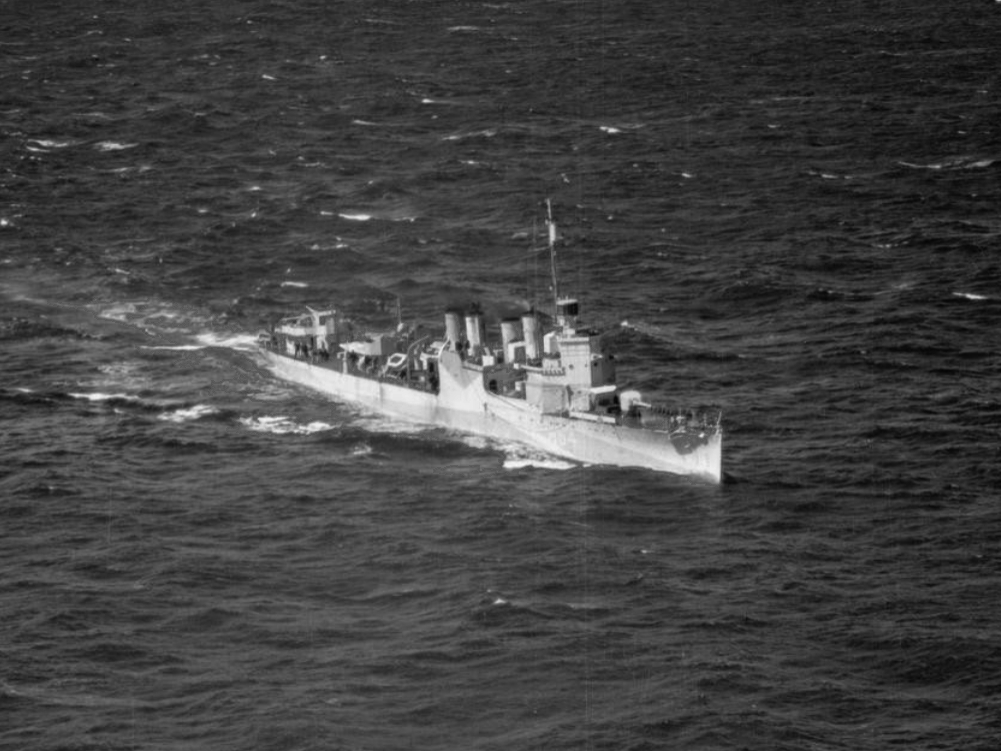
HMS Beverley underway

HMS Beverley arrived at Belfast 24 October and was modified for trade convoy escort service by removal of three of the original 4"/50 caliber guns and three of the triple torpedo tube mounts to reduce topside weight for additional depth charge stowage and installation of hedgehog. In April 1942 she was an escort for Convoy PQ 14 en route to North Russia. En route the convoy was attacked by a superior force of enemy destroyers, which had approached unobserved during a snow storm and fired several torpedoes at a range of 9,000 yards (8,200 m). One merchant ship was sunk. The enemy returned four times and took part in short gunnery duels, but did not close the range below 8,000 yards (7,300 m).

On 4 February 1943, while escorting Atlantic Convoy SC 118 with Escort Group B-2, Beverley sighted the German submarine U-187 (later sunk by HMS Vimy) southeast of Cape Farewell, Greenland. She also took part in attacks on other U-boats the next day.

Beverley was assigned to Escort Group B-4 of the Mid-Ocean Escort Force for convoys ON 140, ON 161, ON 169, HX 229 and ON 176. On 9 April while escorting Convoy ON 176, she collided with the steamship Cairnvolona in bad weather and had her anti-submarine and degaussing gear put out of action. Two days later she was torpedoed by U-188 commanded by Kapitänleutnant Siegfried Lüdden at 52°19′N 40°28′W, and sank with the loss of 139 members of her crew, including her commanding officer.
