= German submarine U-187 =

German World War II submarine

History

Nazi Germany
- Name: U-187
- Ordered: 15 August 1940
- Builder: DeSchiMAG AG Weser, Bremen
- Yard number: 1027
- Laid down: 6 August 1941
- Launched: 16 March 1942
- Commissioned: 23 July 1942
- Fate: Sunk, 4 February 1943

General characteristics
- Class & type: Type IXC/40 submarine
- Displacement: 1,144 t (1,126 long tons) surfaced; 1,257 t (1,237 long tons) submerged
- Length: 76.76 m (251 ft 10 in) o/a; 58.75 m (192 ft 9 in) pressure hull
- Beam: 6.86 m (22 ft 6 in) o/a; 4.44 m (14 ft 7 in) pressure hull
- Height: 9.60 m (31 ft 6 in)
- Draught: 4.67 m (15 ft 4 in)
- Installed power: 4,400 PS (3,200 kW; 4,300 bhp) (diesels); 1,000 PS (740 kW; 990 shp) (electric)
- Propulsion: 2 shafts; 2 × diesel engines; 2 × electric motors
- Speed: 18.3 knots (33.9 km/h; 21.1 mph) surfaced; 7.3 knots (13.5 km/h; 8.4 mph) submerged
- Range: 13,850 nmi (25,650 km; 15,940 mi) at 10 knots (19 km/h; 12 mph) surfaced; 63 nmi (117 km; 72 mi) at 4 knots (7.4 km/h; 4.6 mph) submerged
- Test depth: 230 m (750 ft)
- Complement: 4 officers, 44 enlisted
- Armament: 6 × torpedo tubes (4 bow, 2 stern); 22 × 53.3 cm (21 in) torpedoes; 1 × 10.5 cm (4.1 in) SK C/32 deck gun (180 rounds); 1 × 3.7 cm (1.5 in) SK C/30 AA gun; 1 × twin 2 cm FlaK 30 AA guns

Service record
- Part of: 4th U-boat Flotilla; 23 July – 31 December 1942; 10th U-boat Flotilla; 1 January – 4 February 1943
- Identification codes: M 09 265
- Commanders: Kptlt. Ralph Münnich; 23 July 1942 – 4 February 1943
- Operations: 1 patrol: 12 January – 4 February 1943
- Victories: None

German submarine U-187 was a Type IXC/40 U-boat of Nazi Germany's Kriegsmarine built for service during World War II. Her keel was laid down on 6 August 1941 by DeSchiMAG AG Weser in Bremen as yard number 1027. She was launched on 16 March 1942 and commissioned on 23 July with Kapitänleutnant Ralph Münnich in command.

The U-boat's service began with training as part of the 4th U-boat Flotilla. She then moved to the 10th flotilla on 1 January 1943 for operations.

She was sunk by two British destroyers on 4 February 1943.

== Design ==
German Type IXC/40 submarines were slightly larger than the original Type IXCs. U-187 had a displacement of 1,144 tonnes (1,126 long tons) when at the surface and 1,257 tonnes (1,237 long tons) while submerged. The U-boat had a total length of 76.76 m (251 ft 10 in), a pressure hull length of 58.75 m (192 ft 9 in), a beam of 6.86 m (22 ft 6 in), a height of 9.60 m (31 ft 6 in), and a draught of 4.67 m (15 ft 4 in). The submarine was powered by two MAN M 9 V 40/46 supercharged four-stroke, nine-cylinder diesel engines producing a total of 4,400 metric horsepower (3,240 kW; 4,340 shp) for use while surfaced, two Siemens-Schuckert 2 GU 345/34 double-acting electric motors producing a total of 1,000 shaft horsepower (1,010 PS; 750 kW) for use while submerged. She had two shafts and two 1.92 m (6 ft) propellers. The boat was capable of operating at depths of up to 230 metres (750 ft).

The submarine had a maximum surface speed of 18.3 knots (33.9 km/h; 21.1 mph) and a maximum submerged speed of 7.3 knots (13.5 km/h; 8.4 mph). When submerged, the boat could operate for 63 nautical miles (117 km; 72 mi) at 4 knots (7.4 km/h; 4.6 mph); when surfaced, she could travel 13,850 nautical miles (25,650 km; 15,940 mi) at 10 knots (19 km/h; 12 mph). U-187 was fitted with six 53.3 cm (21 in) torpedo tubes (four fitted at the bow and two at the stern), 22 torpedoes, one 10.5 cm (4.13 in) SK C/32 naval gun, 180 rounds, and a 3.7 cm (1.5 in) SK C/30 as well as a 2 cm (0.79 in) C/30 anti-aircraft gun. The boat had a complement of forty-eight.

== Service history ==
=== Patrol and loss ===
U-187's patrol took her from Kiel on 12 January 1943, across the North Sea and into the Atlantic Ocean through the gap between Iceland and the Faroe Islands.

She was surprised on the surface, 7 nautical miles (13 km; 8.1 mi) ahead of Convoy SC 118. She was sunk in mid-Atlantic by depth charges dropped by the British destroyers HMS Vimy and HMS Beverley at position 50°12′N 36°35′W on 4 February 1943. Nine men died; there were 45 survivors.

== Movie appearance ==
In the 1944 British movie Western Approaches her number can be clearly seen on the submarine that was sunk in a fictional gun battle with a merchant ship.

=== Wolfpacks ===
U-187 took part in two wolfpacks, namely:

- Landsknecht (19 – 28 January 1943)
- Pfeil (1 – 4 February 1943)

== Bibliography ==
- Busch, Rainer; Röll, Hans-Joachim (1999). German U-boat commanders of World War II : a biographical dictionary. Translated by Brooks, Geoffrey. London, Annapolis, Md: Greenhill Books, Naval Institute Press. ISBN 1-55750-186-6.
- Busch, Rainer; Röll, Hans-Joachim (1999). Deutsche U-Boot-Verluste von September 1939 bis Mai 1945 [German U-boat losses from September 1939 to May 1945]. Der U-Boot-Krieg (in German). Vol. IV. Hamburg, Berlin, Bonn: Mittler. ISBN 3-8132-0514-2.
- Gröner, Erich; Jung, Dieter; Maass, Martin (1991). U-boats and Mine Warfare Vessels. German Warships 1815–1945. Vol. 2. Translated by Thomas, Keith; Magowan, Rachel. London: Conway Maritime Press. ISBN 0-85177-593-4.
- Edwards, Bernard (1996). Dönitz and the Wolf Packs - The U-boats at War. pp. 143, 144, 149. ISBN 0-304-35203-9.
- Kemp, Paul (1999). U-Boats Destroyed - German Submarine Losses in the World Wars. London: Arms & Armour. ISBN 1-85409-515-3.
