= SS Wasgenwald =

There have been least two steamships that have been named SS Wasgenwald;

- USS Shoshone (ID-1760), which was launched in 1911 as Wasgenwald.
- USS General G. W. Goethals, which was renamed Wasgenwald in 1926.
