= SS Grunewald =

Steamships that have been called SS Grunewald include:

- USS General G. W. Goethals, which was launched in 1911 as Grunewald
- USS Shoshone (ID-1760), which was renamed Grunewald in 1926
- SS Seapool, which was launched in 1940, and renamed Grunewald in 1951
