= G. W. Goethals =

G. W. Goethals may refer to:

- George Washington Goethals (1858–1928), a United States Army officer and civil engineer
- USS General G. W. Goethals (ID-1443), a cargo ship that was an US Navy troop transport in 1919
