= USS Shoshone (ID-1760) =

German-built cargo and passenger ship

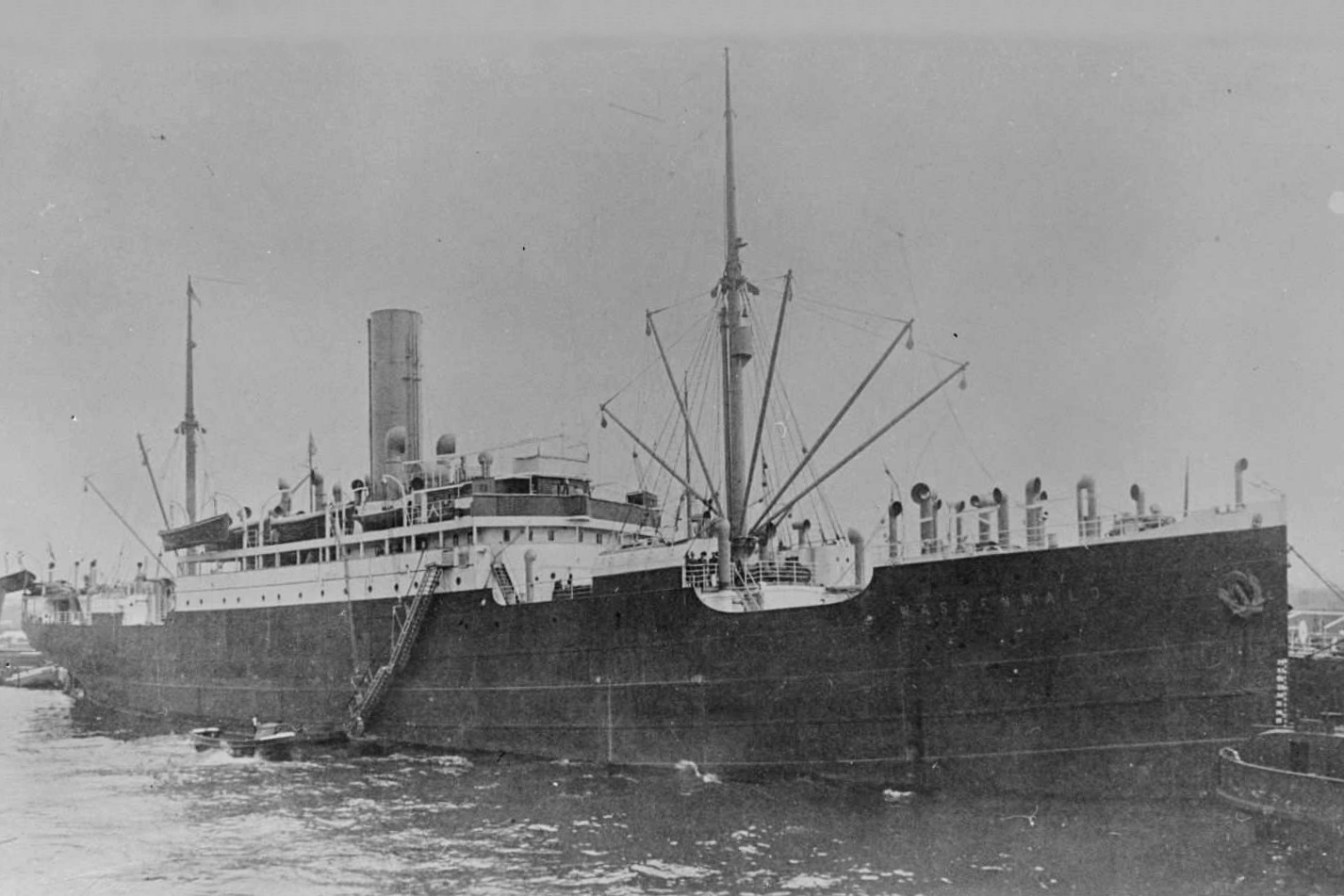
- The ship as Wasgenwald

History
- Name: 1912: Wasgenwald; 1917: Shoshone; 1920: Manoa; 1926: Grunewald
- Namesake: 1912: Vosges; 1917: Shoshone; 1920: Manoa; 1926: Grunewald
- Owner: 1912: Hamburg America Line; 1917: Shoshone Nav Corp; 1920: American Interlake Line; 1921: Canada Steamship Lines; 1926: Boston Iron & Metal Co; 1926: Hamburg America Line
- Operator: 1917: EF Geer; 1919: United States Navy
- Port of registry: 1912: (German Empire) Hamburg; 1917: (United States) New York; 1921: (United Kingdom) London; 1926: (Weimar Republic) Hamburg
- Builder: Bremer Vulkan, Vegesack
- Yard number: 552
- Launched: 30 December 1911
- Completed: February 1912
- Commissioned: into US Navy, 19 Feb 1919
- Decommissioned: from US Navy, 5 Aug 1919
- Identification: 1912: code letters RSDV; 1914: call sign DWG; 1917: US official number 215631; 1917: code letters LHWB; 1919: Naval Registry ID-1760; 1919: US Navy code letters GJDL; 1921: UK official number 143208; 1926: code letters RFVW
- Fate: scrapped 1932 or 1933

General characteristics
- Type: cargo liner
- Tonnage: 4,708 GRT, 2,880 NRT
- Displacement: 4,707 tons
- Length: 367 ft 11 in (112.14 m) overall; 353.1 ft (107.6 m) registered
- Beam: 48.7 ft (14.8 m)
- Draft: 34 ft 2 in (10.4 m)
- Depth: 25.0 ft (7.6 m)
- Decks: 2
- Installed power: 400 NHP; 3,200 ihp
- Propulsion: 1 × quadruple-expansion engine; 1 × screw
- Speed: 13 knots (24 km/h)
- Capacity: passengers: 50 1st class
- Complement: In US Navy: 41
- Armament: in First World War: 1 × 5-inch/51-caliber gun; 1 × 3-inch/50-caliber gun
- Notes: sister ships: Grunewald, Schwarzwald, Steigerwald

USS Shoshone (ID-1760) was a German-built cargo liner that the United States Navy chartered during the First World War. She was launched in 1911 for the Hamburg America Line (HAPAG) as Wasgenwald. The Kerr Steamship Company bought her in 1917 and renamed her Shoshone. In 1919 she spent six months in the United States Navy, in which she made two round trips to and from France to repatriate US troops.

American Interlake Line bought her in 1920 and renamed her Manoa. Canada Steamship Lines bought her in 1921. In 1926 the Boston Iron & Metal Company bought her and sold her back to HAPAG, who renamed her Grunewald. She was scrapped in Germany in 1932 or 1933.

This was the first of two steamships that HAPAG named Wasgenwald. The second was completed in 1922, seized and renamed in 1940, and sunk in 1943. She was the also second of three steamships that HAPAG named Grunewald. The first was her sister ship, which the US seized and renamed General G. W. Goethals in 1917. The third was a ship that was built in 1940, and HAPAG bought and renamed in 1951.

== Building ==
In 1907 and 1908 Furness, Withy & Co in England built a class of three single-screw ships for HAPAG: Westerwald, Spreewald, and Frankenwald. In 1911 HAPAG ordered a class of four sister ships for the "–wald" class that were similar, but with a beam about 3.6 feet (1.1 m) wider; a quadruple-expansion engine instead of a triple-expansion engine; and built in Germany instead of in England. Bremer Vulkan in Bremen-Vegesack built two of the ships: Grunewald and Schwarzwald. Flensburger Schiffbau-Gesellschaft in Flensburg built Steigerwald, and Schichau-Werke in Danzig (now Gdańsk in Poland) built Wasgenwald.

Bremer Vulkan built Wasgenwald as yard number 552. She was launched on 30 December 1911 and completed her in 1912. Her lengths were 367 ft 11 in (112.14 m) overall and 353.1 ft (107.6 m) registered. Her beam was 48.7 ft (14.8 m), her depth was 25.0 ft (7.6 m) and her draft was 34 ft 2 in (10.4 m). Her tonnages were 4,708 GRT, 2,880 NRT, and 4,707 tons displacement. She had berths for 50 first class passengers.

== Wasgenwald ==
HAPAG registered Wasgenwald in Hamburg. Her code letters were RSDV. She was equipped with wireless telegraphy, and by 1914 her call sign was DWG.

Wasgenwald traded to the Caribbean and the East Coast of the United States. On 3 January 1913 she was slightly damaged in port in Newport News, Virginia when a "terrific windstorm" caused a coal barge to crash into her. On 16 May that year she was delayed in Philadelphia by a longshoremen's strike. In August 1913 the wife and family of former President of Venezuela Cipriano Castro crossed the Atlantic on Wasgenwald. They embarked in Tenerife on 6 August and disembarked in Havana on 20 August.

At 11:00 hrs on 1 August 1914, with the First World War imminent, HAPAG announced the suspension of its services. Germany ordered its merchant ships to take refuge in the nearest German or neutral port. Wasgenwald took refuge in Saint Thomas in the Danish West Indies, where the Danish authorities sealed her wireless telegraph apparatus. On 26 September the Norwegian steamship Falk arrived from Brazil to take Wasgenwald's cargo, which was bound for Colón, Panama and ports in the Pacific.

On 10 October 1914 a hurricane hit the Danish West Indies. It sank or drove ashore several ships in Saint Thomas. Wasgenwald and another HAPAG ship, Calabria, dragged their anchors and were driven ashore. Wasgenwald was refloated by 13 October.

== Shoshone ==
In August 1916 Denmark and the United States signed the Treaty of the Danish West Indies, under which the US was to buy the islands. The treaty was ratified in January 1917, and the territory became the United States Virgin Islands on 31 March. Also on 31 March, the Kerr Steamship Company bought Wasgenwald, renamed her Shoshone, and registered her in New York. She was owned via the "Shoshone Navigation Corporation", which was a one-ship company. Her manager was listed as one "EF Geer".

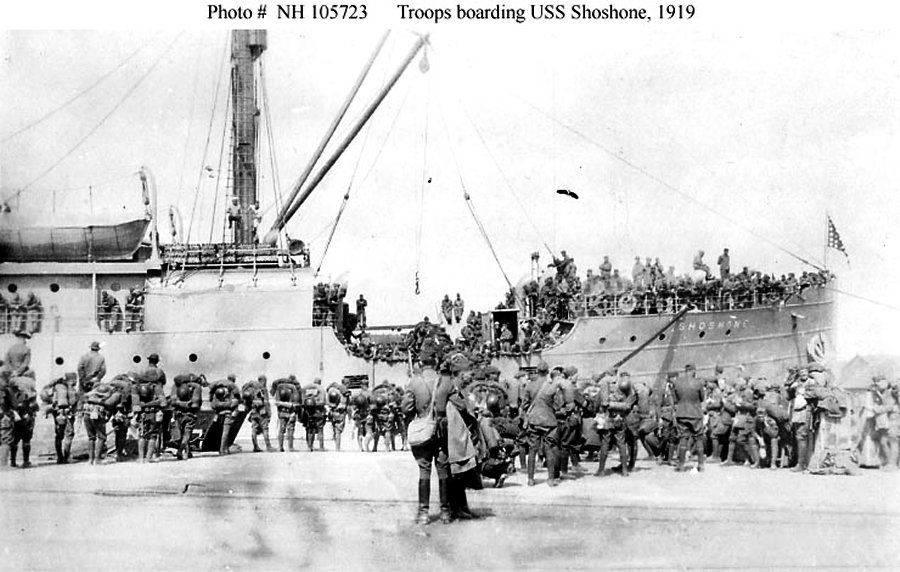
US troops embarking on Shoshone in 1919, presumably in Saint-Nazaire

In mid-October 1917 the United States Army chartered her. Later that month the 5th Naval District inspected her for possible naval use, and gave her the Naval Registry ID-1760. The Dictionary of American Naval Fighting Ships says she was "probably" operated by the United States Shipping Board on Army account with a civilian crew for the remainder of the war. Another source says the Army used her as a collier. She was defensively armed with one 5-inch/51-caliber gun and one 3-inch/50-caliber gun.

On 18 February 1919 Shoshone was commissioned into the US Navy at Shooters Island, New York, as USS Shoshone. Her US Navy code letters were LHWB. On 11 April she moved to Bush Terminal, Brooklyn, where she was dry docked. On 1 May she left New York on her first of two round trips to France. She reached Saint-Nazaire on 14 May, embarked members of the American Expeditionary Forces on 15 and 16 May, and left on 17 May. On 1 June she reached Philadelphia and disembarked her troops. On 5 June she left Philadelphia on the second of her two round trips. She reached Saint-Nazaire on 17 June, but waited until 1 July to embark her troops. She left on 2 July, and reached Bush Bluffs Army base in Virginia on 16 July. On 5 August she was decommissioned at Bush Bluffs, and returned to the Kerr Steamship Company.

== Manoa and Grunewald ==
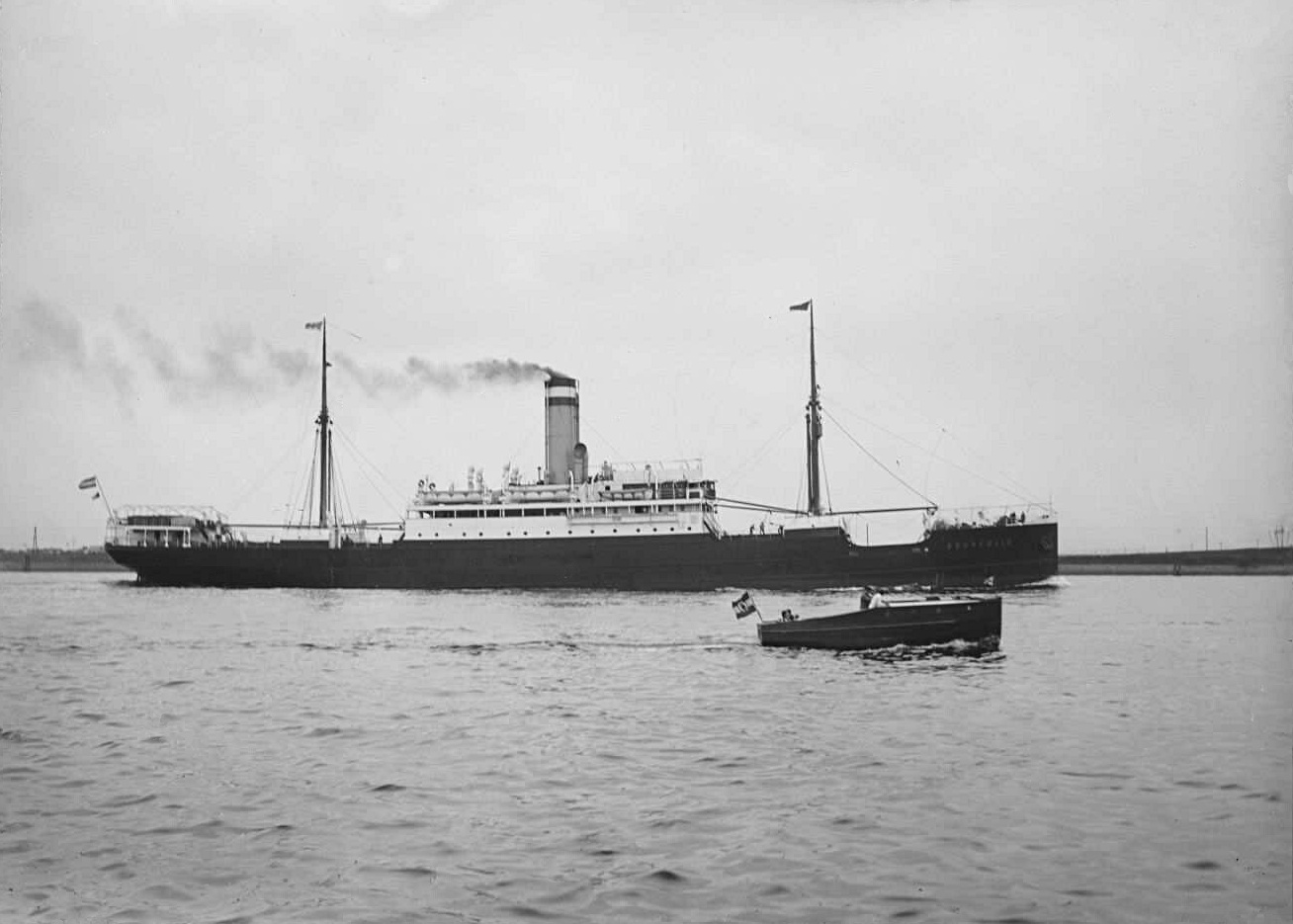
The ship as Grunewald

In 1920 the American Interlake Line bought Shoshone and renamed her Manoa. In 1921 Canada Steamship Lines bought her and registered her in London. Her UK official number was 143208, but neither Lloyd's Register nor the Mercantile Navy List records a set of code letters for her when she was registered in the UK.

In 1926 the Boston Iron and Metal Company of Baltimore, Maryland bought Manoa, and sold her back to HAPAG. A new HAPAG ship called Wasgenwald had been built in 1922, so HAPAG gave Manoa the name of her sister ship Grunewald. HAPAG registered her in Hamburg, and her code letters were RFVW. Deutsche Werft in Hamburg scrapped her in December 1932 or the first quarter of 1933.

== Bibliography ==
- Haws, Duncan (1980). The Ships of the Hamburg America, Adler and Carr Lines. Merchant Fleets in Profile. Vol. 4. Cambridge: Patrick Stephens Ltd. ISBN 0-85059-397-2.
- Lloyd's Register of British and Foreign Shipping. Vol. II.–Steamers. London: Lloyd's Register of Shipping. 1912 – via Internet Archive.
- Lloyd's Register of Shipping. Vol. II.–Steamers. London: Lloyd's Register of Shipping. 1917 – via Internet Archive.
- Lloyd's Register of Shipping. Vol. II.–Steamers. London: Lloyd's Register of Shipping. 1920 – via Internet Archive.
- Lloyd's Register of Shipping. Vol. II.–Steamers and Motorships. London: Lloyd's Register of Shipping. 1924 – via Internet Archive.
- Lloyd's Register of Shipping. Vol. II.–Steamers and Motorships. London: Lloyd's Register of Shipping. 1927 – via Internet Archive.
- The Marconi Press Agency Ltd (1914). The Year Book of Wireless Telegraphy and Telephony. London: The Marconi Press Agency Ltd.
- Mercantile Navy List. London. 1923 – via Crew List Index Project.
- Silverstone, Paul H (2006). The New Navy, 1883–1922. New York: Routledge. ISBN 0-415-97871-8.

Media related to USS Shoshone (ID-1760) at Wikimedia Commons
