= SS Nyassa =

German-built passenger liner

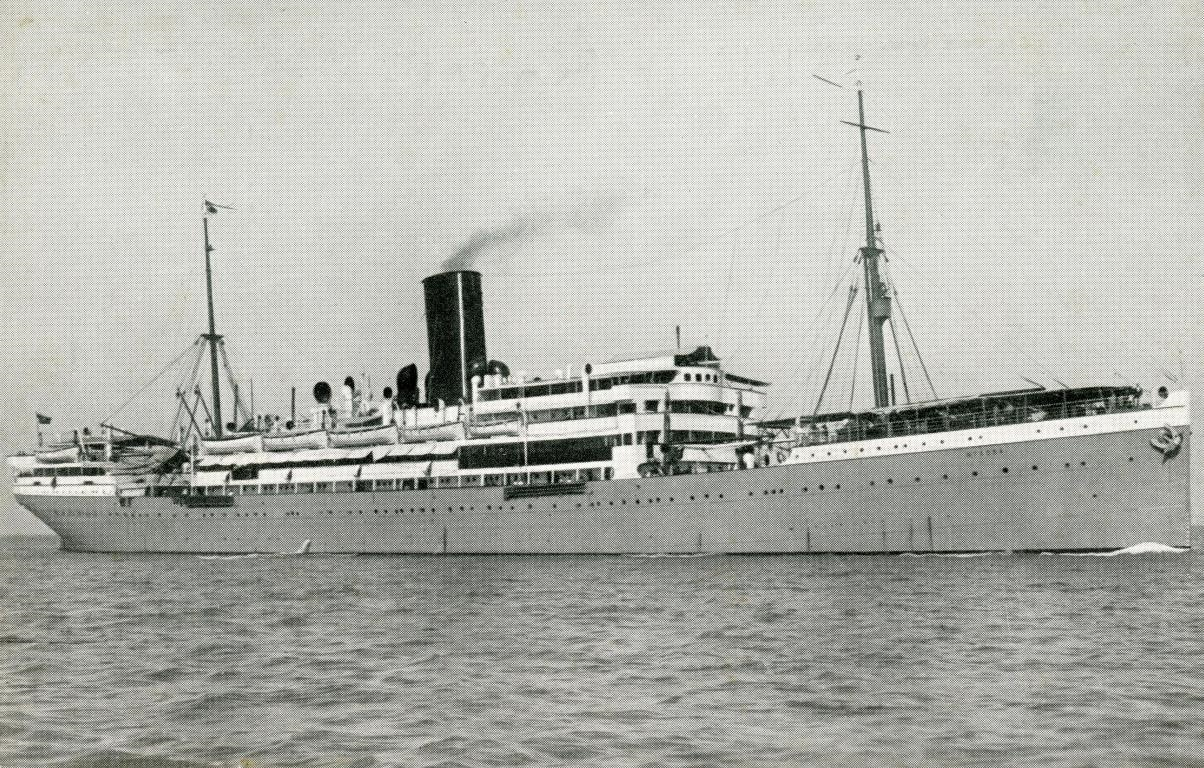
- Nyassa

History
- Name: 1906: Bülow; 1916: Trás-os-Montes; 1924: Nyassa
- Namesake: 1906: General von Bülow; 1916: Trás-os-Montes; 1924: Niassa Province
- Owner: 1906: Norddeutscher Lloyd; 1916: Government of Portugal; 1924: Cia Nacional de Navegação
- Operator: 1916: Transportes Mar do Estado
- Port of registry: 1906: Bremen; 1916: (Portugal) Lisbon
- Route: 1906: Bremen – Yokohama; 1907: Bremen – Sydney; 1908: Bremen – New York; 1938: Lisbon – Island of Mozambique
- Builder: Joh. C. Tecklenborg, Bremerhaven
- Yard number: 209
- Launched: 21 April 1906
- Completed: 22 September 1906
- Out of service: laid up 1922–24; 1950–51
- Identification: 1906: code letters QJFB; by 1913: call sign DBW; 1916: code letters HTOM; by 1934: call sign CSBJ
- Fate: scrapped 1951

General characteristics
- Class & type: "General"-class mail steamship
- Tonnage: 8,965 GRT, 5,034 NRT
- Length: 462.4 ft (140.9 m)
- Beam: 57.6 ft (17.6 m)
- Depth: 36.0 ft (11.0 m)
- Decks: 4
- Installed power: 760 NHP; 6,500 ihp
- Propulsion: 2 × quadruple-expansion engines; 2 × screws
- Speed: 15 knots (28 km/h)
- Capacity: passengers: 108 × 1st class; 106 × 2nd class; 1,830 steerage; by 1934: cargo included 13,014 cu ft (369 m^{3}) refrigerated
- Crew: 194
- Sensors & processing systems: by 1911: submarine signalling; by 1938: echo sounding device

SS Nyassa was a steam ocean liner that was launched in Germany in 1906 as Bülow for Norddeutscher Lloyd (NDL). In 1916 Portugal seized her, renamed her Trás-os-Montes, and placed her under the management of Transportes Marítimos do Estado (TME). In 1924 Companhia Nacional de Navegação (CNN) bought her and renamed her Nyassa. After a long career with CNN she was scrapped in England in 1951.

As Bülow, the ship sailed mostly between Bremen and the Far East. However, she spent 1907 making three return voyages between Bremen and Sydney, and in 1908 she made at least three return voyages between Bremen and New York.

As Nyassa, her scheduled route was between Lisbon and Moçambique via Cape Town. In 1941 she rescued survivors from a British merchant ship that had been sunk by a U-boat. From 1940 to 1944 she made numerous voyages taking refugees from Portugal, Spain, and Morocco to the United States, Argentina, Brazil, Cuba, the Dominican Republic, Mexico, and Palestine.

== "General"-class liners ==
Between 1903 and 1908 NDL took delivery of a class of 11 twin-screw passenger liners, of intermediate size and speed, from four different German shipbuilders. All were named after Prussian field marshals and generals of the 18th and early 19th century, so they were called the Feldherren-Klasse, or in English the "General" class. Schichau-Werke in Danzig (now Gdańsk in Poland) built five of the class, including the lead ship, Zieten, which was launched in 1902 and completed in 1903. Joh. C. Tecklenborg in Bremerhaven built three: Roon in 1903, Scharnhorst in 1904, and Bülow in 1906. AG Weser in Bremen built two, and AG Vulcan in Stettin (now Szczecin in Poland) built one.

== Building ==
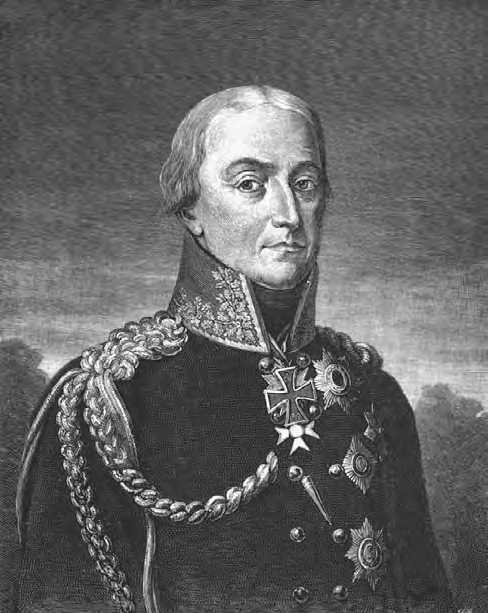
Freiherr von Bülow

Tecklenborg built the ship as yard number 209. She was launched on 21 April 1906 as Bülow, after Friedrich Wilhelm Freiherr von Bülow (1755–1816), a Prussian Army general who served in the Napoleonic Wars. She was completed and made her sea trials on 22 September.

Her registered length was 462.4 ft (140.9 m), her beam was 57.6 ft (17.6 m), and her depth was 36.0 ft (11.0 m). Her hull had a double bottom and nine watertight bulkheads. The watertight doors in the bulkheads could be closed hydraulically by remote control from her bridge, and she was designed to remain afloat with any two of her compartments flooded.

She had berths for 2,044 passengers: 108 in first class; 106 in second class; and 1,830 in steerage. Her amenities included a passenger gymnasium with electric exercise machines. Some of her cargo holds were refrigerated. Her tonnages were 8,965 GRT and 5,034 NRT.

Each of her screws was driven by a quadruple-expansion engine. The combined power of her twin engines was rated at 760 NHP or 6,500 ihp. On her sea trials she averaged 5,980 ihp, and maintained 16 knots (30 km/h). Her normal cruising speed in service was 15 knots (28 km/h).

== Bülow ==
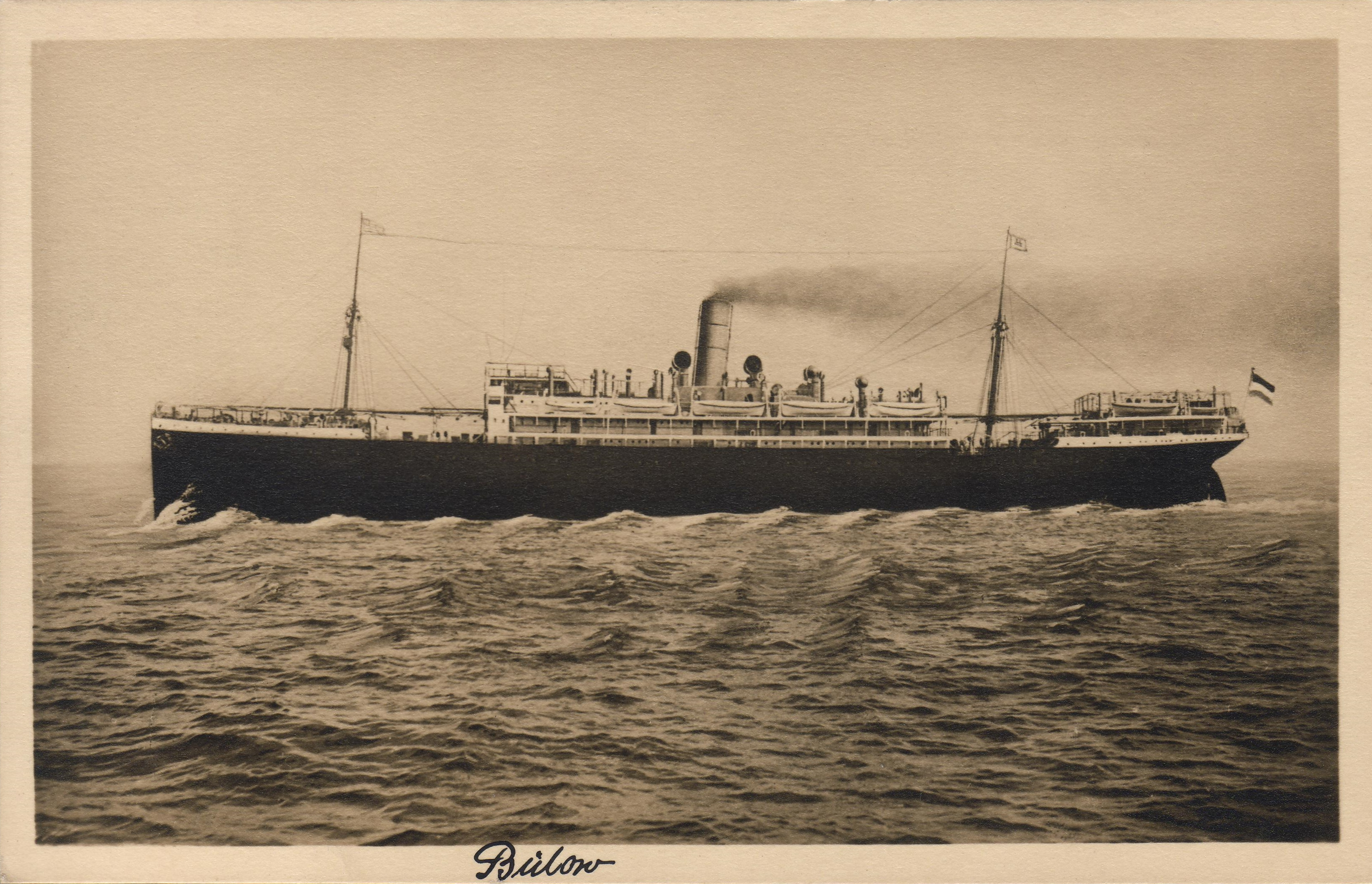
A postcard of the ship as Bülow

NDL registered Bülow in Bremen. Her code letters were QJFB. On 26 September 1906 she left Bremen on her maiden voyage, which was on NDL's route to the Far East via the Suez Canal.

After her maiden voyage, Bülow made three trips to Australia. On the first she left Bremen on 23 January 1907, carrying passengers including a German grand opera company recruited by the theatre producer George Musgrove. She called at Antwerp, Southampton, Genoa, Naples, and Port Said; passed through the Suez Canal; and called at Aden and Colombo. On 4–5 March she called at Fremantle; on 9 March she arrived off Adelaide; and on 12–13 March she called at Melbourne. On 16 March she reached NDL's wharf at West Circular Quay in Sydney. With Bülow and other ships of similar speed, NDL planned to reduce the journey time between Bremen and Sydney by five days. On her return voyage, Bülow left Sydney on 23 March, called at Melbourne on 25 March, Adelaide on 28 March, and Fremantle on 2 April, and reached Bremen on 8 May.

On her next voyage to Australia, Bülow reached Sydney on 3 July with passengers including 112 agricultural labourers for the Colonial Sugar Refining Company, who were to change ships in Sydney and continue to Queensland. 104 of them were from Catalonia in Spain. The other eight were from Lincolnshire in England, where they had been earning nine shillings a week. Their contract with the sugar company increased their wage to 22 shillings and sixpence.

On her final voyage to Australia, Bülow reached Sydney on 23 October. Her passengers included four German scientists on their way to research in New Guinea. At Circular Quay they transferred to the NDL ship Prinz Sigismund to complete their journey. For her return voyage, Bülow loaded 6,900 bales of wool. She left Sydney on 2 November.

In 1908 NDL Bülow made at least three round trips on NDL's main North Atlantic route. She left Bremen on 11 January, on 23 January she arrived off New York, and on 28 January she left New York to return to Bremen. She made another transatlantic crossing that summer. She left Bremen on 25 July, was due in New York on 5 August, and left New York on 13 August to return to Bremen. She left Bremen again on 12 September with 503 passengers, arrived off New York on 23 September, and on 1 October left New York to return to Bremen.

By 1911 Bülow was equipped with submarine signalling and wireless telegraphy. By 1913 her wireless call sign was DBW.

In 1914 Bülow was on NDL's route between Bremen and Yokohama. Her ports of call were Rotterdam, Antwerp, Southampton, Gibraltar, Algiers, Genoa, Naples, Port Said, Suez, Aden, Colombo, Penang, Singapore, Hong Kong, Shanghai, Tsingtau (now Qingdao), and Kobe. On return voyages she called at Nagasaki instead of Tsingtau.

On 2 May Bülow left Yokohama on a return voyage to Bremen via Suez. On 18 June she ran aground in fog on the west side of the Isle of Portland in the English Channel. Tugs rescued her 300 passengers and their baggage, and landed them at Weymouth. Bülow was only slightly damaged, and was the next day she was refloated and anchored in Portland Harbour to re-embark her passengers.

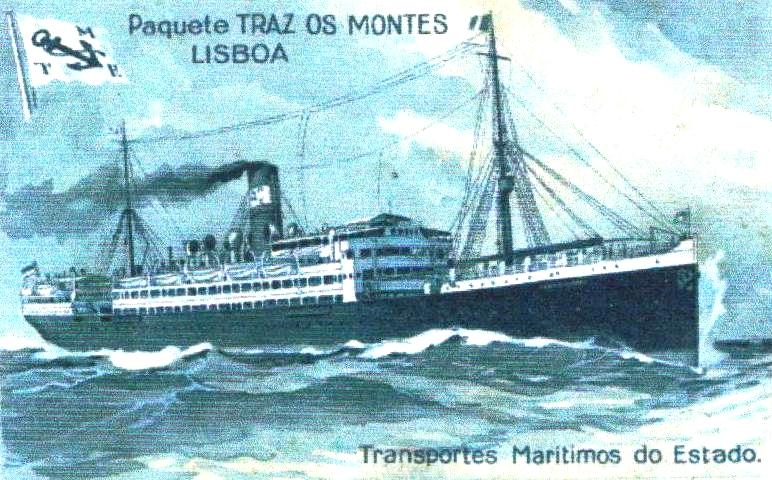
A postcard of the ship as Trás-os-Montes

In July 1914 Bülow left Bremen on her next voyage. When the First World War began on 3 August, she took refuge in Lisbon. On 23 February 1916, the commander of the Portuguese Navy division in Lisbon seized 36 German and Austro-Hungarian ships in the port, including Bülow. On each ship a Portuguese crew was put aboard, the flag of the German Empire was lowered, and the flag of Portugal was raised. An explosive device was discovered in Bülow's boiler room, which was designed to detonate if the ship were moved. The Portuguese prevented it from being detonated, but her machinery was damaged.

== Trás-os-Montes ==
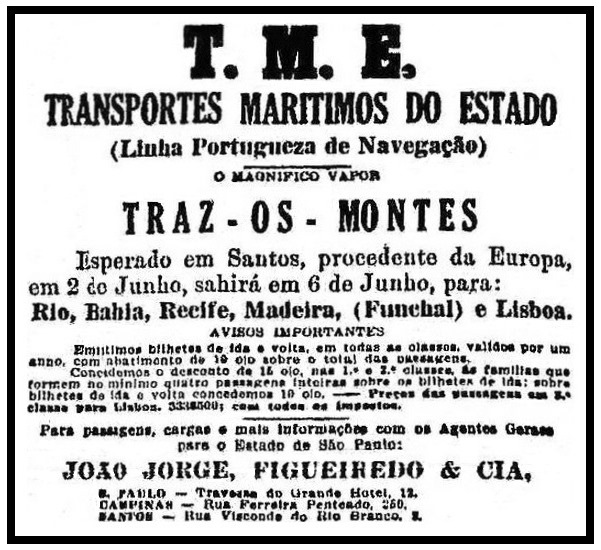
TME advertisement for "the magnificent steamer" Trás-os-Montes to sail between Rio de Janeiro and Lisbon in June 1922

The Portuguese Government assumed ownership of all the German and Austro-Hungarian ships, and founded a state-owned enterprise, Transportes Marítimos do Estado (TME), to manage them. Bülow was renamed Trás-os-Montes, after the region of the same name in northeastern Portugal. She was registered in Lisbon. Her code letters were HTOM.

After the First World War, TME tried to start several scheduled liner routes. Trás-os-Montes was one of the ship that it put on a route between Lisbon and Rio de Janeiro via Funchal, Recife, and Salvador (see advertisement). However, TME ceased trading, and from 1922 Trás-os-Montes was laid up in Lisbon.

== Nyassa ==
In 1924 Companhia Nacional de Navegação (CNN) bought Trás-os-Montes and renamed her Nyassa, after Niassa Province in northern Moçambique. CNN put her on its route between Lisbon and Moçambique, serving various Portuguese islands and African territories of the Portuguese Empire en route. By January 1938 her ports of call were Funchal, São Tomé, Pointe-Noire, Luanda, Porto Amboim, Lobito, Moçâmedes, Cape Town, Lourenço Marques (now Maputo), Beira, and the Island of Mozambique.

By 1932 the combined power of her twin engines had been reassessed as 1,170 NHP. By 1934 the refrigerated capacity in her holds was 13,014 cu ft (369 m^{3}). Also by 1934, her wireless call sign was CSBJ, and this had superseded her code letters. By June 1938 she was equipped with an echo sounding device.

=== 1940 refugee voyage ===
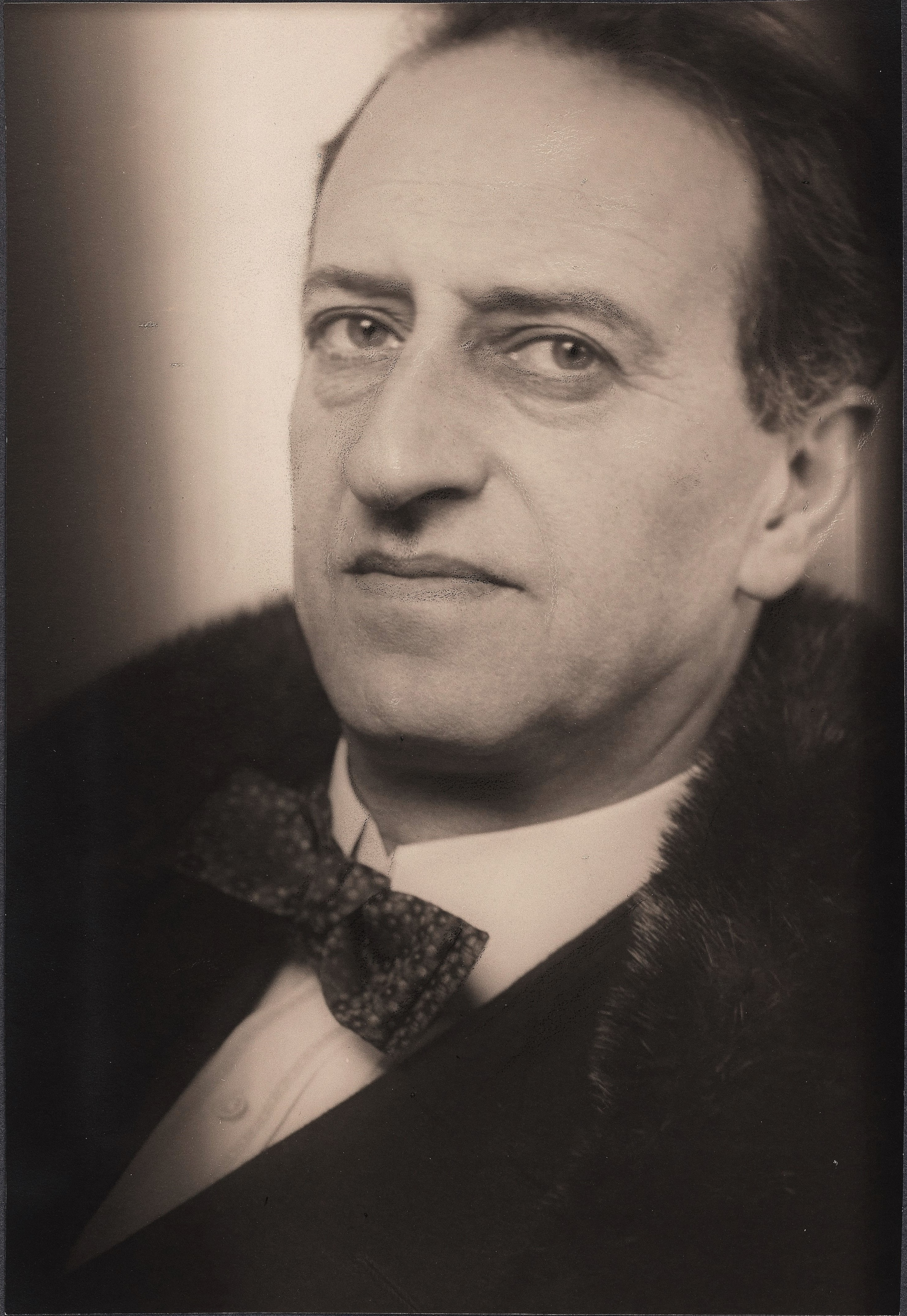
Composer Oscar Straus

Portugal remained neutral in the Second World War, and at first Nyassa remained on her scheduled route. However, in November 1940 she was diverted to take refugees from Europe to the United States. She left Lisbon on 23 November carrying 458 passengers, many of them refugees from German-occupied Europe, and some of whom had been held in insanitary internment camps in France. They included the electrical engineer and inventor Georges Lakhovsky, composer Oscar Straus, the son-in-law and daughter of the former President of Lithuania Antanas Smetona, and 27 Thais on a long and indirect journey home to Thailand. On 2 December her steering gear from her bridge froze in sub-zero temperatures. From then on she was steered from the emergency steering wheel on her poop, guided by telephone from her bridge. On 4 December she reached the quarantine station at Hoffman Island, New York, flying the signal flags for "I am out of control".

=== Andalusian rescue ===
On the evening of 17 March 1941, U-106 made a torpedo attack on Convoy SL 68 off the coast of French West Africa, sinking two cargo ships. They included Ellerman & Papayanni Lines' Andalusian, which sank at position 15°50′N 20°42′W. There were no fatalities, and the 42 crew abandoned ship in two lifeboats. Her Master commanded the starboard lifeboat, carrying 23 men; while her Chief Officer commanded her port lifeboat, carrying 18 men. Overnight the two lifeboats became separated. The Chief Officer's boat headed for Cape Verde, and landed on Boa Vista on 20 March.

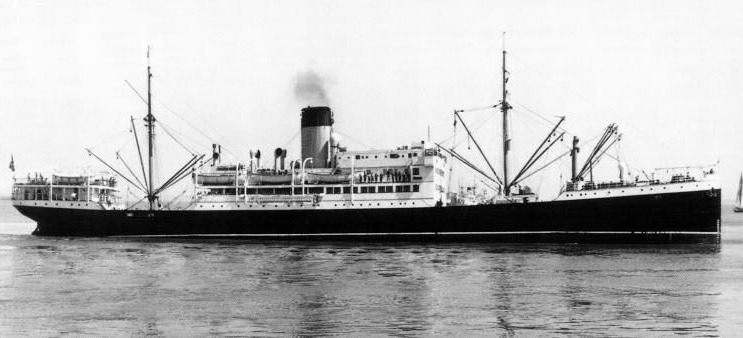
The steamship Lima

The Master's boat set sail for Bathurst (now Banjul) in Gambia. On 20 March Nyassa sighted the boat and rescued its occupants. Nyassa was en route to Lisbon via Funchal and Casablanca, where she was to disembark 400 Frenchmen who had refused to serve with the Free French forces. Andalusian's survivors feared being captured in Vichy-ruled Morocco, so they disambarked in Funchal. A few days later they continued their voyage aboard Lima, which reached Lisbon on 29 March.

=== 1941 refugee voyages ===
Two dormitories were created in Nyassa's cargo holds, one forward and the other aft, to carry an additional 400 steerage passengers. On 16 April she left Lisbon carrying 816 passengers. Fares ranged from $160 for a berth in one of the dormitories, to $480 for a berth in a first class cabin. Passengers included the historian Julius Brutzkus, art dealer Herman Rothschild, and the 83-year-old father of shipping entrepreneur Arnold Bernstein. Passengers in the dormitories complained of a lack of light, ventilation, and space. One passenger said conditions were "abominable", and led to "several clashes between the passengers". Nyassa reached New York on 25 April.

Nyassa next left Lisbon carrying refugees on 25 May, and reached New York before 16 June.

In July 1941 Nyassa left Lisbon carrying passengers including 400 refugees. She called at Casablanca, where the passengers she embarked included another 200 refugees. She arrived in New York on 9 August carrying a total of 690 passengers. Among them was Hedwig Ehrlich, who was the widow of scientist Paul Ehrlich and sister of industrialist Max Pinkus. As Nyassa steamed up the East River to her pier, the New York pilot in charge of her miscalculated the state of the tide. The top 10 feet (3 m) of her foremast hit the Brooklyn Bridge, and was bent over at 90 degrees.

On 9 September 1941 Nyassa left Lisbon carrying 540 refugees. On 22 September she called at Havana, Cuba, where 318 of them disembarked. The remainder continued to New York.

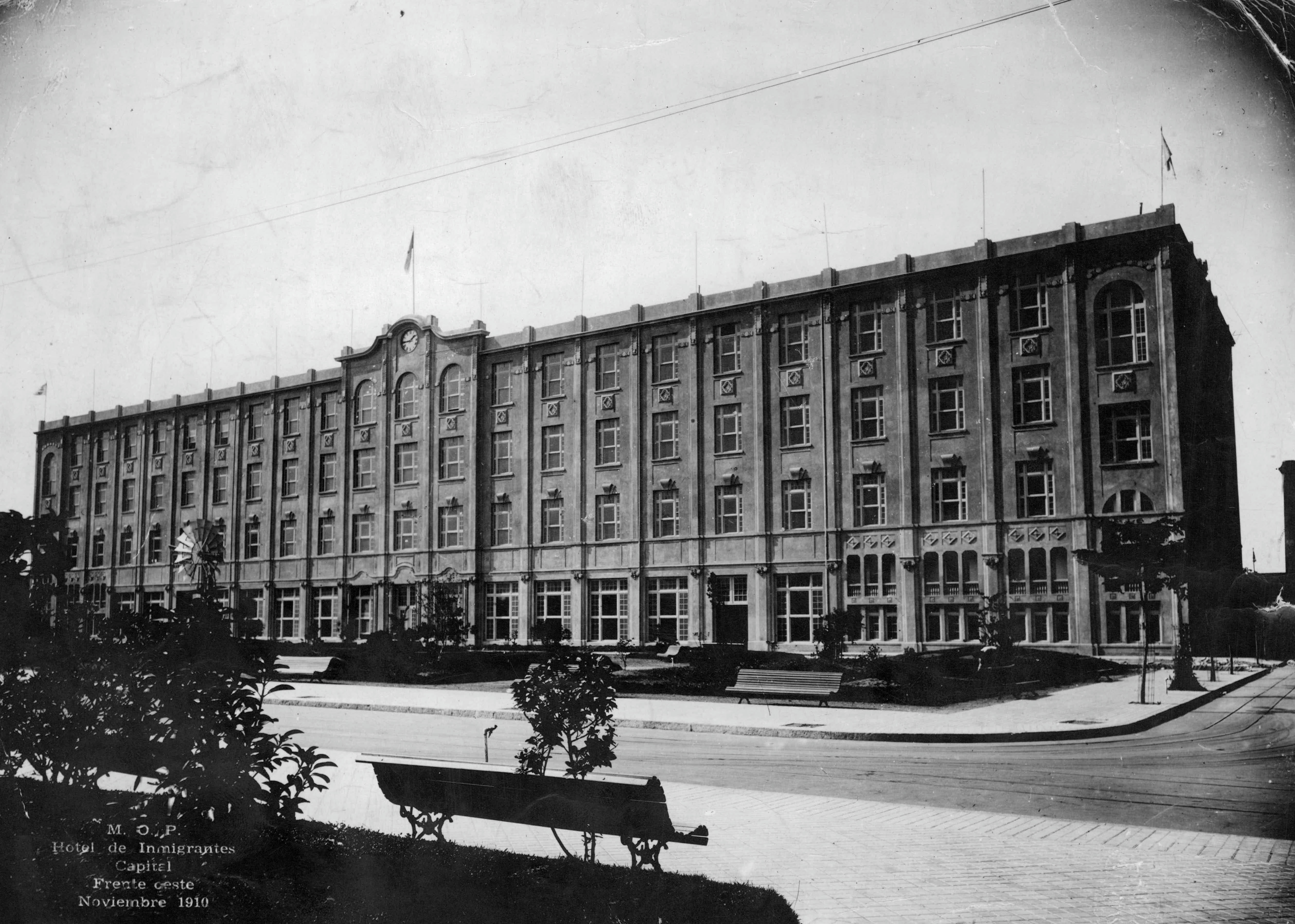
Hotel de Inmigrantes, Buenos Aires

On 12 November 1941 Nyassa left Lisbon carrying more than 600 refugees, most of whom were elderly. She disembarked 400 of them in Brazil, and then took more than 200 to Buenos Aires, where she arrived on 7 or 8 December. Argentinian immigration officers let 185 of them disembark on arrival, but 31 were at first denied permission to disembark. Most were in transit to either Colombia or Paraguay, and were allowed to disembark by 16 December. Three were detained in the Hotel de Inmigrantes, and one married couple was sent back to Europe because the wife was suffering from trachoma.

=== 1942 refugee voyages ===
Nyassa left Lisbon in January 1942, and sailed via Casablanca to North America. On 3 March she reached Veracruz in Mexico, where disembarked 48 Spanish Republican refugees and a number of Jewish refugees. She also disembarked Jewish refugees at Newport News, Virginia on 17 March, and at Ciudad Trujillo (now Santo Domingo) in the Dominican Republic on 20 March. Her passengers on this voyage also included Jewish refugees destined for Cuba.

On 3 June 1942 Nyassa reached New York with 64 passengers after another voyage from Lisbon via Casablanca and Veracruz. At Veracruz she disembarked 865 Spanish Republicans. In New York she embarked 180 or 200 German nationals for repatriation to Europe, and left on 13 June.

On 10 July 1942 Nyassa left Lisbon, and a few days later she called at Casablanca to embark refugees who had arrived there from Marseille. On 21 July she arrived in Bermuda, where the United Kingdom authorities held her for five days. On 30 July she arrived in Baltimore carrying nearly 800 refugees, of whom 350 were Jewish and 198 were children. On arrival, two sick passengers were removed from the ship on stretchers. One, Bertha Klein, was taken by ambulance to the Marine Hospital in Baltimore, where she was declared dead on arrival. US authorities held the remainder aboard the ship, while US Navy intelligence, US Army intelligence, the FBI, and Baltimore Police Department checked each passenger. By the next day, nearly 200 passengers had been detained at Fort Howard.

The United States Customs Service seized jewellery from one refugee aboard Nyassa who had failed to declare them. At first it was reported that he had concealed diamonds, emeralds, rings and brooches worth a total of $50,000. On 11 September 1942 he pleaded guilty to smuggling uncut diamonds worth $9,000. US District Court judge William Calvin Chesnut fined him $1,000 and sentenced him to 30 days' imprisonment, after which both the defendant and his wife were to be deported from the US.

=== 1943 refugee voyages ===
Nyassa left Lisbon in April 1943. By 7 May she had arrived in the US, carrying refugees including Oliver Freud, one of the sons of psychologist Sigmund Freud. On 24 June she left Lisbon with another party of refugees travelling to the US.

=== 1944 refugee voyages ===
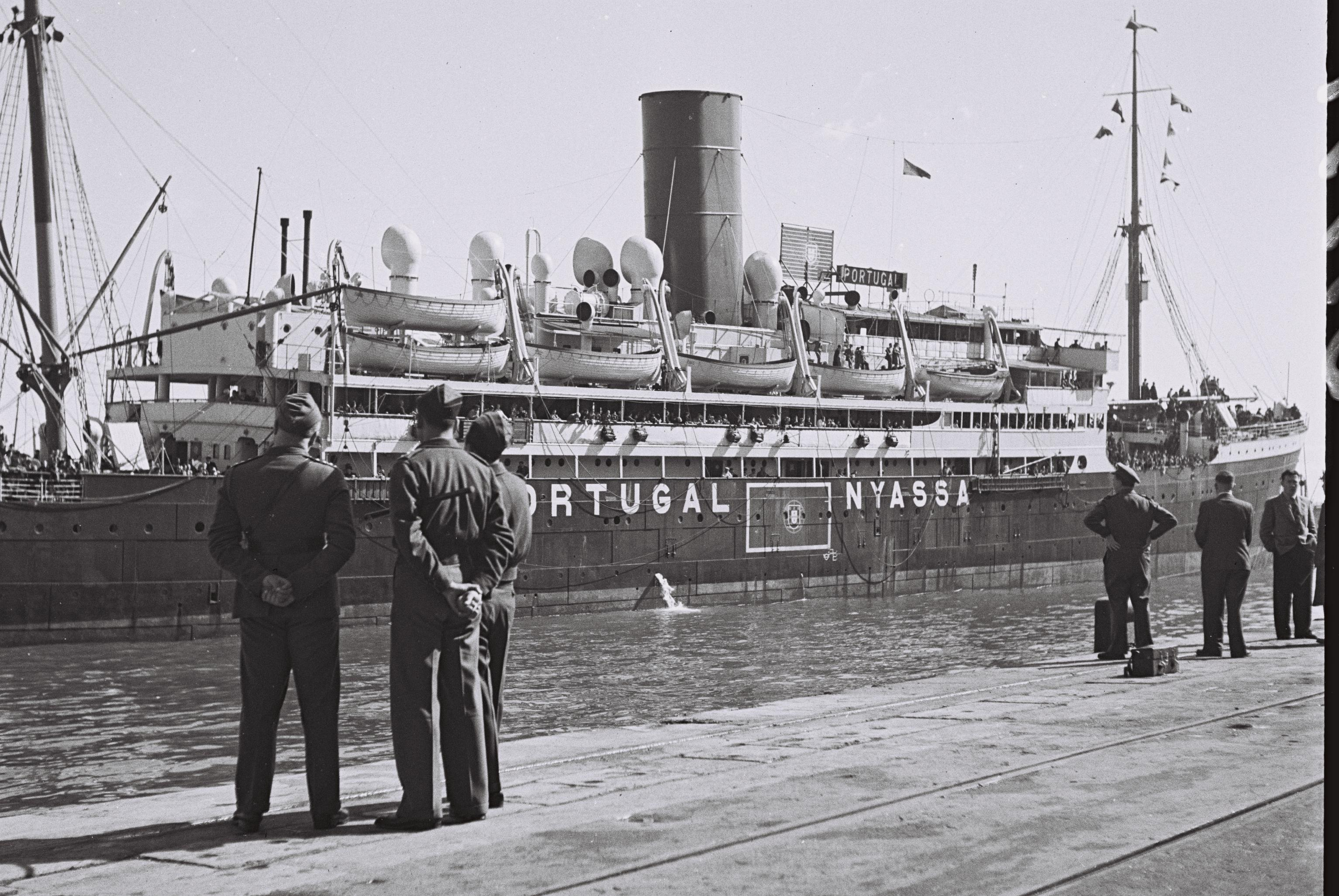
Nyassa in Haifa, Palestine, 1 February 1944

Nyassa left Lisbon on 25 January 1944 carrying 172 Jewish refugees, some of whom had been in Portugal since 1933. She then called at Cádiz, where she embarked another 570 refugees. She was then to continue through the Suez Canal to Portuguese India and return via Moçambique to Portugal, repatriating civil servants who were long overdue home leave because of the war. The voyage made Nyassa the first merchant ship to make a commercial voyage through the Mediterranean and the Suez Canal since Italy joined the Second World War in June 1940.

In June 1944 Nyassa left Lisbon carrying 75 refugees and 25 US citizens. On 8 July she reached Philadelphia after a 17-day crossing. On 18 September she left Lisbon with 118 passengers, including 95 refugees. On 1 October she reached Philadelphia. 13 of her refugees were to join relatives already living in the US. The remainder were to travel onward to Canada.

=== Final years ===
After the Second World War, Nyassa returned to her scheduled route between Lisbon and Moçambique. More than four decades after she was built, her machinery was still capable of 14 knots (26 km/h). From January 1950 she was laid up in Lisbon. In 1951 she was scrapped in Blyth, England.

== See also ==
- SS Lourenço Marques

== Bibliography ==
- Hughes, David; Humphries, Peter (1977). In South African Waters Passenger Liners Since 1930. Cape Town: Oxford University Press. ISBN 0-19-570120-8.
- Lloyd's Register of British and Foreign Shipping. Vol. I.–Steamers. London: Lloyd's Register of Shipping. 1907 – via Internet Archive.
- Lloyd's Register of British and Foreign Shipping. Vol. I.–Steamers. London: Lloyd's Register of Shipping. 1910 – via Internet Archive.
- Lloyd's Register of Shipping. Vol. II.–Steamers. London: Lloyd's Register of Shipping. 1917 – via Internet Archive.
- Lloyd's Register of Shipping. Vol. II.–Steamers. London: Lloyd's Register of Shipping. 1921 – via Internet Archive.
- Lloyd's Register of Shipping. Vol. II.–Steamers & Motorships. London: Lloyd's Register of Shipping. 1924 – via Internet Archive.
- Lloyd's Register of Shipping. Vol. II.–Steamers and Motorships of 300 tons gross and over. London: Lloyd's Register of Shipping. 1931 – via Southampton City Council.
- Lloyd's Register of Shipping. Vol. II.–Steamers and Motorships of 300 tons gross and over. London: Lloyd's Register of Shipping. 1934 – via Southampton City Council.
- Lloyd's Register of Shipping. Vol. II.–Steamers and Motorships of 300 tons gross and over. London: Lloyd's Register of Shipping. 1938 – via Southampton City Council.
- The Marconi Press Agency Ltd (1913). The Year Book of Wireless Telegraphy and Telephony. London: The St Katherine Press.
- Rothe, Klaus (1986). Deutsche Ozean-Passagierschiffe 1896 bis 1918. Bibliothek der Schiffstypen (in German). Berlin: VEB Verlag für Verkehrswesen. ISBN 3-344-00059-4.
