= General G. W. Goethals =

General G. W. Goethals may refer to:

== People ==
- George Washington Goethals (1858–1928), a United States Army officer and civil engineer

== Ships ==
- USS General G. W. Goethals (ID-1443), a cargo ship and that was an US Navy troop transport in 1919
