= USS E-2 =

E-class submarine of the United States

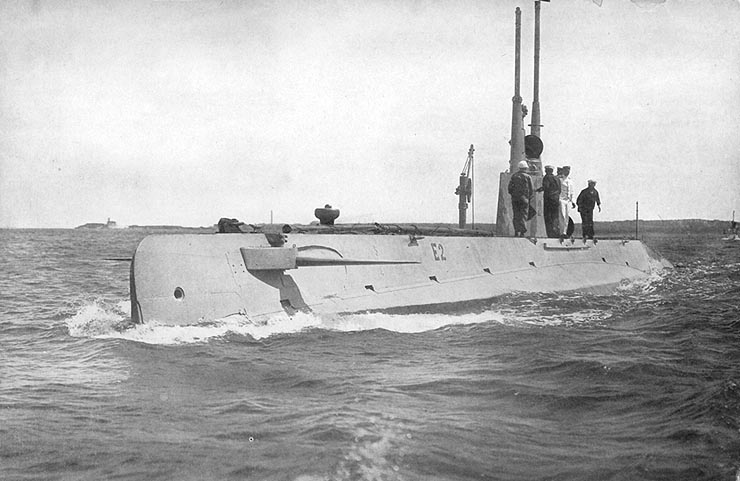
- USS E-2, ex-Sturgeon, underway prior to World War I

History

United States
- Name: Sturgeon
- Namesake: The sturgeon
- Builder: Fore River Shipyard, Quincy, Massachusetts
- Cost: $390,930.12 (hull and machinery)
- Laid down: 22 December 1909
- Launched: 16 June 1911
- Sponsored by: Miss Margaret Nelson Little
- Commissioned: 14 February 1912
- Decommissioned: 13 March 1916
- Recommissioned: 25 March 1918
- Decommissioned: 20 October 1921
- Renamed: E-2 (Submarine No.25), 17 November 1911
- Stricken: 20 October 1921
- Identification: Hull symbol: SS-25 (17 July 1920); Call sign: NTJ
- Fate: Sold for scrapping, 19 April 1922

General characteristics
- Class & type: E-class submarine
- Displacement: 287 long tons (292 t) surfaced; 342 long tons (347 t) submerged
- Length: 135 ft 3 in (41.22 m)
- Beam: 14 ft 7 in (4.45 m)
- Draft: 11 ft 8 in (3.56 m)
- Installed power: 700 hp (522 kW) (diesel); 600 hp (447 kW) (electric)
- Propulsion: 2 × NELSECO diesel engines; 2 × Electro Dynamic electric motors; 2 × 60-cell batteries; 2 × Propellers
- Speed: 13.5 kn (25.0 km/h; 15.5 mph) surfaced; 11.5 kn (21.3 km/h; 13.2 mph) submerged
- Range: 2,100 nmi (3,900 km; 2,400 mi) at 11 kn (20 km/h; 13 mph) surfaced; 100 nmi (190 km; 120 mi) at 5 kn (9.3 km/h; 5.8 mph) submerged
- Test depth: 200 ft (61 m)
- Capacity: 8,486 US gal (32,120 L; 7,066 imp gal) fuel
- Complement: 1 officer; 19 enlisted
- Armament: 4 × 18 inch (450 mm) bow torpedo tubes (4 torpedoes)

USS Sturgeon/E-2 (SS-25), also known as "Submarine No. 25", was an E-class submarine of the United States Navy (USN). She was the first boat of the USN named for the sturgeon, though she was renamed E-2 prior to commissioning.

== Construction ==
Sturgeon was laid down on 22 December 1909, by the Fore River Shipbuilding Company, in Quincy, Massachusetts. She was launched on 16 June 1911, sponsored by Miss Margaret Nelson Little. She was renamed E-2 on 17 November 1911; and commissioned on 14 February 1912.

== Service history ==
Serving in the Atlantic Submarine Flotilla, E-2 sailed out of Newport, Rhode Island, for developmental exercises and training. From 5 January–21 April 1914, she cruised to Guantanamo Bay and the Gulf of Mexico. She returned to Naval Station Newport, on 27 July, for training operations for the remainder of the summer and from February–May 1915 off Florida.

On 19 June 1915, she entered New York Navy Yard, for overhaul. While sitting in dry dock Number 2, E-2 suffered a violent explosion and fire, on 15 January 1916, when hydrogen gas ignited during conditions of severe battery testing; tests made under the direction of the Edison Storage Battery Company. At the time, E-2 was the test submarine for new nickel–iron battery designed to eliminate the danger from chlorine gas asphyxiation. There were 32 men aboard the submarine at the time of the explosion, consisting of both Navy and civilian electricians and mechanics making repairs. Four men were killed and seven injured. The government investigation, led by then Lieutenant Chester W. Nimitz, pointed blame away from the submarine's commanding officer, then Lieutenant Charles M. Cooke, Jr.

On 13 March, E-2 was placed out of commission for use as a laboratory, for exhaustive tests of the Edison storage battery. Recommissioned on 25 March 1918, E-2 served in training and experimental work at New London, until 16 May. Two days later she arrived at Norfolk, to operate against enemy submarines off Cape Hatteras. From 21 May–27 August, she made four war patrols, sighting a large enemy submarine for which she made extended submerged search on her last patrol. E-2 was commended by the Chief of Naval Operations for two of these anti-submarine patrols, which were exceptionally long for a submarine of her size.

Returning to New London, on 31 August 1918, E-2 made two more patrols before the end of the war, then returned to training student officers and qualifying men for duty in submarines.

== Fate ==
She sailed from New London to Norfolk, on 19 April 1920, arriving two days later. There she was placed in commission in ordinary, on 18 July 1921. On 17 September, she sailed for Philadelphia Navy Yard, where she was decommissioned on 20 October 1921, and sold on 19 April 1922.

== Bibliography ==
- "Table 21 - Ships on Navy List June 30, 1919". Congressional Serial Set. U.S. Government Printing Office: 764. 1921.
- Gary, Priolo. "Sturgeon / E-2 (SS-25)". Navsource.net.
- Cressman, Robert J. (11 January 2022). "E-2". Dictionary of American Naval Fighting Ships. Navy Department, Naval History and Heritage Command. This article incorporates text from this source, which is in the public domain.
- "2 Killed on U.S. Submarine Blown up in Brooklyn Dock". The Evening World. New York. 15 January 1916. p. 1.
- "Naval Board of Inquiry proceedings regarding culpable explosion of the Edison battery installation". The New York Times. 16 February 1916.
