= USS General G. W. Goethals =

German-built cargo and passenger ship

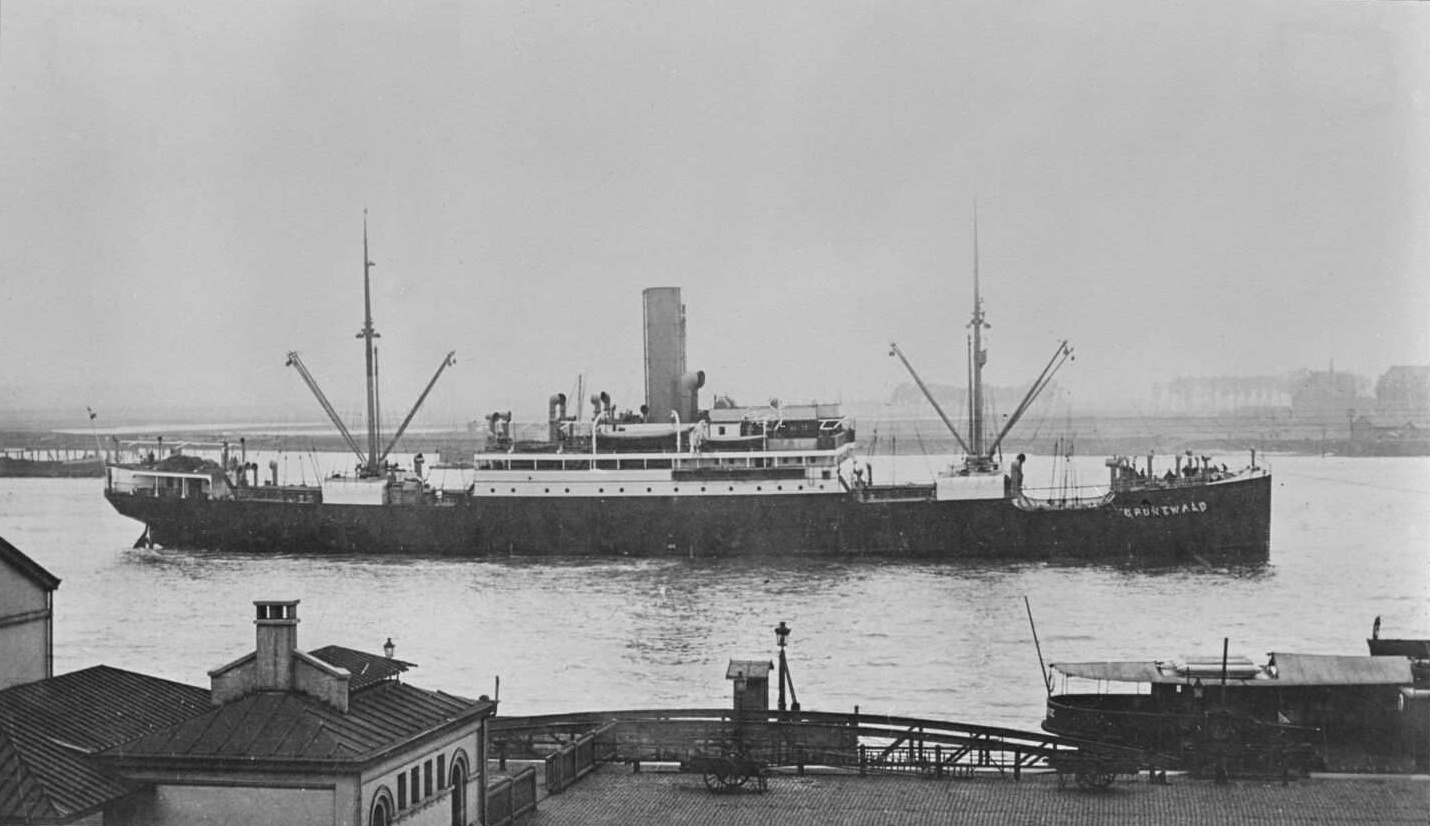
- The ship as Grunewald

History
- Name: 1912: Grunewald; 1917: General G. W. Goethals; 1926: Munorleans
- Namesake: 1912: Grunewald; 1917: George W Goethals; 1926: Munson + New Orleans
- Owner: 1912: Hamburg America Line; 1917: US Shipping Board; 1920: Panama Canal Railway; 1925: Winthrop Waite; 1926: Munson Steamship Line
- Operator: 1917: Panama Canal Railway; 1919 United States Navy
- Port of registry: 1912: (German Empire) Hamburg; 1917: (United States) New York
- Builder: Bremer Vulkan, Vegesack
- Yard number: 551
- Completed: 1911 or 1912
- Acquired: for US Navy, 10 Mar 1919
- Commissioned: into US Navy, 10 Mar 1919
- Decommissioned: from US Navy, 13 Sep 1919
- Identification: 1912: code letters RSDN; by 1914: call sign DGR; 1917: US official number 215106; 1917: code letters LHDT; 1919: Naval Registry ID-1443; 1919: US Navy code letters GJKM; by 1934: call sign WNCG
- Fate: scrapped 1937

General characteristics
- Type: cargo liner
- Tonnage: 4,707 GRT, 2,883 NRT
- Displacement: 2,783 tons
- Length: 367 ft (112 m) overall; 353.1 ft (107.6 m) registered
- Beam: 48.7 ft (14.8 m)
- Draft: 27 ft 6 in (8.4 m)
- Depth: 25.0 ft (7.6 m)
- Decks: 2
- Installed power: 400 NHP
- Propulsion: 1 × quadruple-expansion engine; 1 × screw
- Speed: 11 knots (20 km/h)
- Troops: nearly 1,000
- Complement: in US Navy service: 77
- Crew: 1931: 71
- Notes: sister ships: Schwarzwald, Steigerwald, Wasgenwald

USS General G. W. Goethals (ID-1443) was a German cargo liner that the United States seized during the First World War. She was launched in 1911 for the Hamburg America Line (HAPAG) as Grunewald. In 1917 the US seized her in Panama, and the Panama Canal Railway (PCR) operated her for the United States Shipping Board (USSB). In 1919 she spent six months in the United States Navy, in which she made three round trips to and from France to repatriate US troops. In 1920 the PRC bought her from the USSB. In 1925 the Black Star Line owned her. In 1926 the Munson Steamship Line bought her and renamed her Munorleans. She was scrapped in Scotland in 1937.

This was the first of three steamships that HAPAG named Grunewald. The second was her sister ship Wasgenwald, which HAPAG renamed in 1926. The third was a ship that was built in 1940, and HAPAG bought and renamed in 1951.

== Building ==
In 1907 and 1908 Furness, Withy & Co in England built a class of three single-screw ships for HAPAG: Westerwald, Spreewald, and Frankenwald. In 1911 HAPAG ordered a class of four sister ships for the "–wald" class that were similar, but with a beam about 3.6 feet (1.1 m) wider; a quadruple-expansion engine instead of a triple-expansion engine; and built in Germany instead of in England. Bremer Vulkan in Bremen-Vegesack built two of the ships: Grunewald and Schwarzwald. Flensburger Schiffbau-Gesellschaft in Flensburg built Steigerwald, and Schichau-Werke in Danzig (now Gdańsk in Poland) built Wasgenwald.

Grunewald was completed in 1911 or 1912. Her lengths were 367 ft (112 m) overall and 353.1 ft (107.6 m) registered. Her beam was 48.7 ft (14.8 m), her depth was 25.0 ft (7.6 m), and her draft was 27 ft 6 in (8.4 m). Her tonnages were 4,707 GRT, 2,883 NRT, and 2,783 tons displacement. Bremer Vulkan built her quadruple-expansion engine, which was rated at 400 NHP, and gave her a speed of 11 knots (20 km/h).

== Grunewald ==
HAPAG registered Grunewald in Hamburg. Her code letters were RSDN. She was equipped with wireless telegraphy, and by 1914 her call sign was DGR.

At 11:00 hrs on 1 August 1914, with the First World War imminent, HAPAG announced the suspension of its services. Germany ordered its merchant ships to take refuge in the nearest German or neutral port. Grunewald took refuge in Colón, Panama. On 12 September 1916 it was reported that her Chief Engineer was drowned when a launch in which he was traveling overturned in the Chagres River below the spillway of the Gatun Dam.

== General G. W. Goethals ==
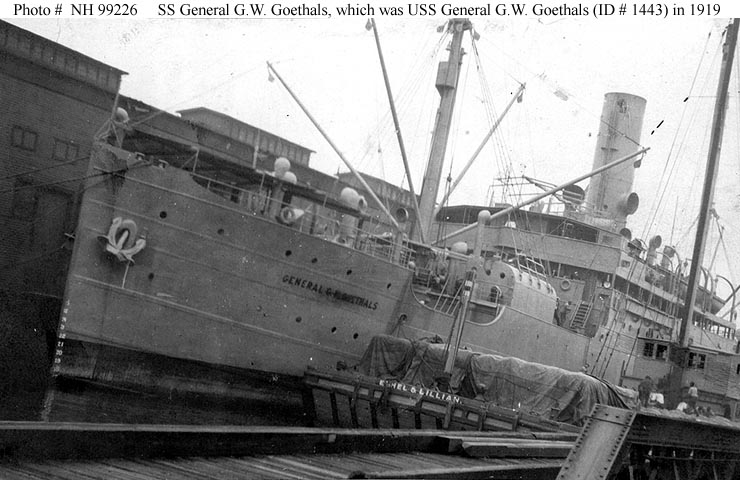
General G. W. Goethals in port sometime between 1917 and 1919

On 6 April 1917 the USA declared war on Germany, and seized German ships in US ports. On 30 June President Woodrow Wilson issued an executive order authorising the USSB to take possession and title of 87 German ships, including Grunewald. The USSB appointed the Panama Canal Railway to manage Grunewald. She was renamed after General George Washington Goethals, who had supervised the building of the Panama Canal, and was now General Manager of the Emergency Fleet Corporation. The ship General G. W. Goethals was registered in New York; her US official number was 215106; and her code letters were LHDT.

The US Navy's Cruiser and Transport Force took over General G. W. Goethals. She was commissioned at Hoboken, New Jersey with the Naval Registry ID-1443, and US Navy code letters GJKM. The Navy operated it under United States Army account.

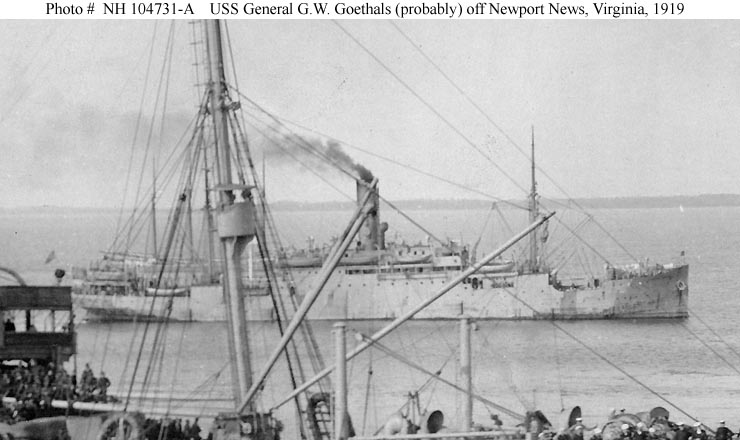
A ship, probably General G. W. Goethals, off Newport News in 1919

General G. W. Goethals made three transatlantic round trips between the US and France. On each trip she took supplies to France, and repatriated American Expeditionary Forces troops to the US. On her first voyage she left New York on 2 April, sailed to Bordeaux, and returned on 4 May. On her three return voyages she repatriated a total of nearly 3,000 troops.

On 21 August 1919 General G. W. Goethals left Charleston carrying supplies to New Orleans, San Cristóbal, Panama, and San Juan. On 13 September she arrived in New York, was decommissioned, and transferred to the US Department of War for return to the USSB. By June 1920 ownership of the ship had passed from the USSB to the PRC.

== USS S-5 rescue ==
On 24 August 1920 General G. W. Goethals left Colón for New York via Haiti. At about 14:00 hrs on 1 September the submarine USS S-5 sank accidentally during a practice crash dive at position 38°36′N 74°00′W, 55 nautical miles (102 km) east of Cape Henlopen. Her crew partly refloated her, raising her stern at a 60-degree angle about 30 feet (9 m) above the surface of the sea. Using a various drills and other tools they made a hole in her hull, about 7 by 5/8 inch (178 by 16 mm). Through it they poked a brass pipe on which they waved a man's undershirt as an improvised white flag.

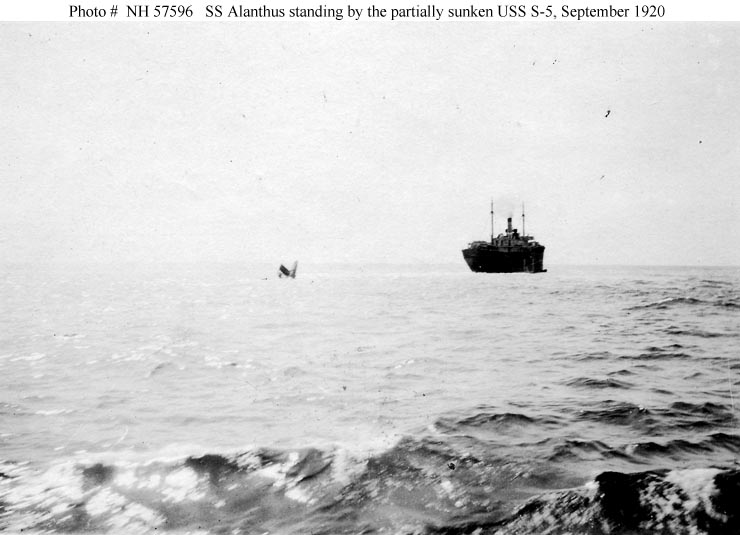
Alanthus (right) standing by the disabled USS S-5 (left)

On 2 September the cargo steamship Alanthus sighted S5's stern and saw her white flag being waved. Alanthus' crew secured the submarine to the ship's stern, and rigged a floating staging around it. With a hose and a deck pump they supplied S-5's crew with air, and with buckets and a funnel they supplied fresh water, but they were unable to enlarge the hole to enable the submariners to escape. Alanthus had a wireless, but no wireless operator, so she was unable to radio for help.

At about 17:20 hrs on 2 September General G. W. Goethals was about 45 nautical miles (83 km) east of the Delaware Capes when her lookout sighted Alanthus about 7 nautical miles (13 km) off her port bow. Alanthus was flying a distress signal with signal flags. Goethals' Master, Captain EO Swensen, changed course toward Alanthus. When Goethals was 1/2 nautical mile (1 km) away she lowered a boat, in which her Chief Engineer, Chief Officer, Chief Wireless Operator and two ship's doctors transferred to Alanthus.

The Chief Engineer, William Grace, returned to Goethals to fetch tools and his first assistant. The Chief Wireless Operator, CF Asche, found that Alanthus' transmitter had a range of only about 20 nautical miles (37 km). His Assistant Wireless Operator, HO Byers, used Goethals' apparatus to transmit the first signal about the emergency at 18:00 hrs. The Fourth Naval District at Philadelphia Navy Yard received the signal, and sent the destroyer USS Breckinridge to assist.

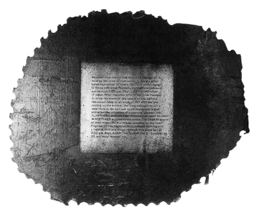
The piece of plate that General G. W. Goethals' crew cut from S-5's hull to allow men to escape is on display at the National Museum of the United States Navy in Washington, D.C.

The plates of S-5's hull were about 3/4 inch (19 mm) thick. At about 19:00 hrs Grace, using a ratchet drill, started making a line of holes around an area of hull plating about 12 by 10 inches (300 by 250 mm). He then used a chisel to cut the steel between each pair of holes. At about 01:20 hrs Grace and his first assistant, R McWilliam, used a crowbar to prise the cut-out section from S-5's hull. At about 01:45 hrs the first submariner emerged through the hole. S-5's commander, Lieutenant Commander Charles M. Cooke, Jr., was last to leave. He ensured that all the watertight doors in the submarine were closed, to help to keep her afloat, and emerged through the hole at 02:45 hrs.

Alanthus' crew had swung the boom of a derrick over the stern. From it they suspended a bosun's chair, with which each submariner was brought aboard. All 37 submariners were rescued. After the rescue was completed, Breckinridge arrived, and Goethals resumed her voyage to New York. On 9 September Goethals left New York on her next voyage to Haiti.

After the rescue on 3 September, Alanthus started to tow S-5 toward the Delaware Breakwater. Later the battleship USS Ohio arrived, S-5's crew transferred to her, and the battleship took over the towing. But the towline broke, and S-5 sank later that day. The piece of S-5's hull plating that Chief Engineer Grace removed to free the submariners is displayed in the National Museum of the United States Navy in the Washington Navy Yard in Washington, D.C.

== The UNIA and Munorleans ==
On 10 January 1925 the Universal Negro Improvement Association (UNIA) bought General G. W. Goethals for the Black Star Line. However, in March 1926 the UNIA was forced to sell her to pay mooring charges and repair costs. In June 1926 a Winthrop Waite was registered as her legal owner. This may have been the Winthrop Waite who later became President of the Northern Railroad of New Jersey. Munson Line bought the ship at auction for a fraction of what the UNIA had paid for her, and renamed her Munorleans.

On 4 November 1926 Munorleans left San Juan, Puerto Rico. She called at Havana, Cuba and Nassau, Bahamas, and on 27 November 1926 arrived in New York. There United States Customs Service officers found 14 Spanish and Portuguese stowaways hiding under a wooden structure in one of her coal bunkers. The stowaways were sent to Ellis Island, and three members of Munorleans' crew were arrested on suspicion of helping them.

In 1929 Munorleans' route was between New York and Brazil. By 1934 her wireless call sign was WNCG, and this had superseded her code letters. She was scrapped in Ardrossan, Scotland in 1937.

== Bibliography ==
- Garvey, Marcus (1995). Hill, Robert Abraham (ed.). The Marcus Garvey and Universal Negro Improvement Association Papers. Vol. IX: Africa for the Africans, June 1921 – December 1922. Berkeley: University of California Press. ISBN 978-0520916821.
- Haws, Duncan (1980). The Ships of the Hamburg America, Adler and Carr Lines. Merchant Fleets in Profile. Vol. 4. Cambridge: Patrick Stephens Ltd. ISBN 0-85059-397-2.
- Lloyd's Register of British and Foreign Shipping. Vol. II.–Steamers. London: Lloyd's Register of Shipping. 1912 – via Internet Archive.
- Lloyd's Register of Shipping. Vol. II.–Steamers. London: Lloyd's Register of Shipping. 1919 – via Internet Archive.
- Lloyd's Register of Shipping. Vol. II.–Steamers. London: Lloyd's Register of Shipping. 1920 – via Internet Archive.
- Lloyd's Register of Shipping. Vol. II.–Steamers and Motorships. London: Lloyd's Register of Shipping. 1926 – via Internet Archive.
- Lloyd's Register of Shipping (PDF). Vol. II.–Steamers and Motorships of 300 tons gross and over. London: Lloyd's Register of Shipping. 1934 – via Southampton City Council.
- The Marconi Press Agency Ltd (1914). The Year Book of Wireless Telegraphy and Telephony. London: The Marconi Press Agency Ltd.
- White, Wallace H (1930). To Further Develop an American Merchant Marine: Hearings Before the Committee on the Merchant Marine and Fisheries, House of Representatives, Seventy-First Congress, Second Session, on H. R. 8361. Washington: United States Government Printing Office.
