= USS S-5 =

S-class submarine of the United States

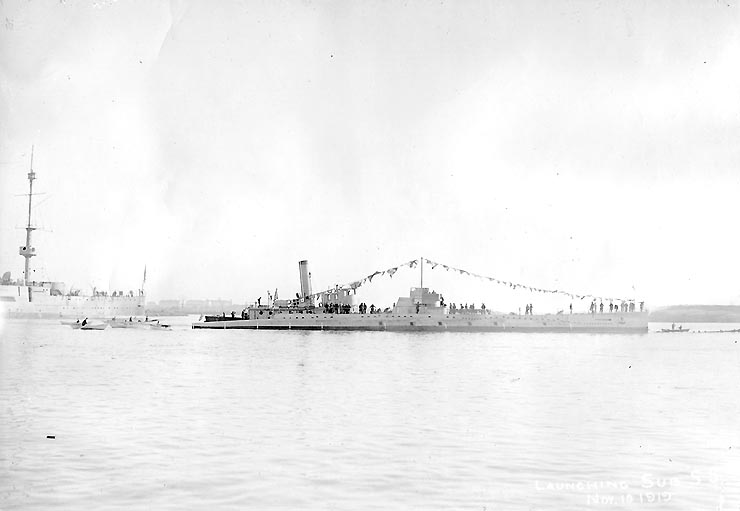
- USS S-5 immediately after her launching at Portsmouth Navy Yard, in Kittery, Maine, on 10 November 1919, she is dressed overall

History

United States
- Name: S-5
- Builder: Portsmouth Navy Yard, on Seavey Island, Kittery, Maine
- Cost: $675,391.67 (hull and machinery)
- Laid down: 4 December 1917
- Launched: 10 November 1919
- Sponsored by: Mrs. Geraldine Burrell
- Commissioned: 6 March 1920
- Stricken: 1921
- Identification: Hull symbol: SS-110 (17 July 1920); Call sign: NIMM
- Fate: Foundered, 1 September 1920

General characteristics
- Class & type: S-3-class submarine
- Displacement: 875 long tons (889 t) surfaced; 1,088 long tons (1,105 t) submerged
- Length: 231 feet (70 m)
- Beam: 21 ft 10 in (6.65 m)
- Draft: 13 ft 1 in (3.99 m)
- Installed power: 1,400 brake horsepower (1,044 kW) diesel; 1,200 hp (895 kW) electric
- Propulsion: 2 × NELSECO diesel engines; 2 × Westinghouse Electric Corporation electric motors; 1 × 120-cell batteries; 2 × propellers
- Speed: 15 knots (28 km/h; 17 mph) surfaced; 11 kn (20 km/h; 13 mph) submerged
- Test depth: 200 ft (61 m)
- Capacity: 36,950 US gallons (139,900 L; 30,770 imp gal) fuel
- Complement: 4 officers; 34 enlisted
- Armament: 4 × 21-inch (533 mm) torpedo tubes (12 torpedoes); 1 × 4-inch (102 mm)/50-caliber

USS S-5 (SS-110), also known as "Submarine No. 110", was an S-3-class, also referred to as a "Government"-type, submarine of the United States Navy.

She sank on 1 September 1920, when the main air induction valve jammed in the open position, causing her to flood. The crew was rescued, but the boat was lost.

== Design ==
The "Government"-type had a length of 231 feet (70.4 m) overall, a beam of 21 ft 10 in (6.7 m), and a mean draft of 13 ft 1 in (4.0 m). They displaced 875 long tons (889 t) on the surface and 1,088 long tons (1,105 t) submerged. All S-class submarines had a crew of 4 officers and 34 enlisted men, when first commissioned. They had a diving depth of 200 ft (61.0 m).

For surface running, the S-3-class were powered by two 700-brake-horsepower (522 kW) NELSECO diesel engines, each driving one propeller shaft. When submerged each propeller was driven by a 600-horsepower (447 kW) Westinghouse Electric Corporation electric motor. They could reach 15 knots (28 km/h; 17 mph) on the surface and 11 kn (20 km/h; 13 mph) underwater.

The boats were armed with four 21-inch (533 mm) torpedo tubes in the bow. They carried eight reloads, for a total of twelve torpedoes. The S-3-class submarines were also armed with a single 4 in (100 mm)/50 caliber deck gun.

== Construction ==
S-5's keel was laid down on 4 December 1917, by the Portsmouth Navy Yard, of Kittery, Maine. She was launched on 10 November 1919, sponsored by Mrs. Geraldine Burrell, and commissioned on 6 March 1920, with future Admiral, Lieutenant Commander Charles M. "Savvy" Cooke, Jr., in command.

== Service history ==
When the US Navy adopted its hull classification system on 17 July 1920, she received the hull number SS-110.

Following builder's trials, outfitting, and crew training, S-5 departed the Boston Navy Yard, on 30 August 1920, to undergo full-power trials 55 nautical miles (102 km; 63 mi) off the Delaware Capes.

=== Sinking ===
At 13:00, on 1 September 1920, she commenced a dive for a submerged test run. Water unexpectedly entered the submarine through the main air induction system, pouring into the control room, engine room, torpedo room, and the motor room.

Normal procedure was to leave the main air induction valve open until the engines had a chance to come to a full stop, this operation being so timed as to occur just prior to complete submergence. In the case of S-5, however, the chief of the boat, Gunner's Mate Percy Fox, the man responsible for operating this valve, was momentarily distracted. Noticing the mistake, he grabbed the valve lever and jerked hard, causing the valve to jam open. After considerable difficulty, the system valves in the other compartments were closed, but all efforts to secure the torpedo room valve met with failure. The abandoned torpedo room flooded, making the boat bow-heavy. An additional 80 long tons (81 t) of water in the motor room bilges caused her to settle on the bottom. It was now impossible to eject water from the torpedo room. An attempt was then made to pump out the motor room, but a gasket blew out and there were no means for repair. Lying 194 ft (59 m) on the bottom, the crew had little hope of being found, much less being rescued.

The crew reasoned that sufficient buoyancy in the after section could tilt the sub on her nose and extend the stern above the surface. The tilt would cause the water in the motor room to drain forward and increase buoyancy further. However, there was great risk involved because this would allow salt water into the battery room, which would generate deadly chlorine gas. They hoped to have enough time, after the water had entered, to close the watertight door before the gas could reach a dangerous level.

After making preparations, air was applied to the after ballast and fuel tanks, blowing them dry. The stern began to rise and then shot to the surface. Men, floor plates, bilge water, and other loose objects fell through the length of the submarine. One man nearly drowned in the battery room, but was fished out, and the compartment door was sealed against the gas.

By tapping on the hull, it was determined that the stern extended about 17 ft (5.2 m) above the water. With inadequate tools, they took turns trying to cut a hole in the thick hull. After 36 hours, they had only succeeded in making a hole 3 in (76 mm) in diameter.

The steamship Alantus detected the plight of the submarine. With additional assistance from the Panama Railway Company steamship General G. W. Goethals, a much larger hole was cut, and the entire crew was rescued.

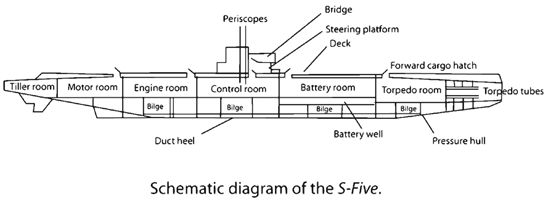
Side view of USS S-5

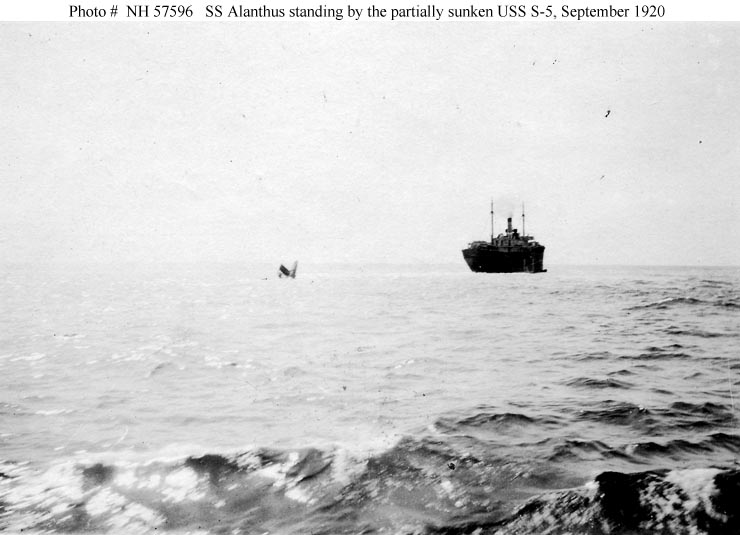
The steamship Alantus standing by the stern of S-5 on 2 September 1920, the day after S-5 accidentally sank off the Delaware Bay

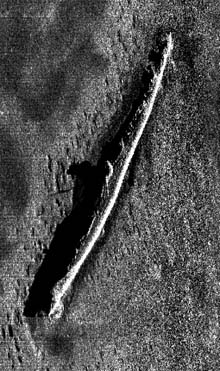
NOAAS Whiting's sonar image of the wreck of S-5 on the ocean bottom, made in late July 2001, when Whiting surveyed the site

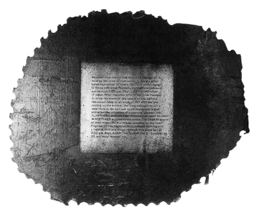
The circle of plating General G. W. Goethals cut from S-5's hull, to allow men to escape, is on display at the Navy Museum, at the Washington Navy Yard, in Washington, D.C., it is approximately 2 ft (0.61 m) in diameter and 3/4 in (19 mm) thick

Once the crew was offloaded from S-5, the battleship Ohio secured a towline to her stern and proceeded to tow her to shallower water. The towline, however, parted and the loose submarine bobbed, then plunged to the bottom about 15 nmi (28 km; 17 mi) off Cape May, New Jersey.

The Navy began an unsuccessful attempt to raise S-5, but called it off in November 1920. A second effort in 1921, also was unsuccessful, and S-5 was struck from the Naval Vessel Register that year. She was the fourth submarine lost in US Navy history.

The wreck was dived immediately after the sinking, by US Navy divers who surveyed it with a view of possible salvage. As a known net-snag, the location of the wreck was known by local fishermen for years, and beginning in the early 1970’s it was regularly visited by sport scuba divers, who have explored it to the present day. Laying on a white sand bottom in an area with generally good visibility, she is one of the most accessible and interesting United States submarines dived by divers on the east coast of the United States.

Claims that she was “first located” by a NOAA research ship in 2001 have been made, but do not stand to scrutiny.

== Museum holdings and displays ==
The portion of S-5's hull plating that General G. W. Goethals removed to permit the crew of the submarine to escape is on exhibit in the National Museum of the United States Navy, in the Washington Navy Yard, in Washington, D.C.

NOAA donated the sonar data Whiting gathered in 2001, during her discovery of the wreck of S-5, to the Submarine Force Library and Museum, in Groton, Connecticut, for archiving and display.

== Bibliography ==
- "Table 21 - Ships on Navy List June 30, 1919". Congressional Serial Set. U.S. Government Printing Office: 770. 1921.
- Friedman, Norman (1995). U.S. Submarines Through 1945: An Illustrated Design History. Annapolis, Maryland: Naval Institute Press. ISBN 1-55750-263-3.
- Priolo, Gary. "S-5 (SS-110)". Navsource.net.
- Hall, Anne Martin (1925). Ships of the United States navy and their sponsors, 1913-1923.
- "S-5". Dictionary of American Naval Fighting Ships. Navy Department, Naval History and Heritage Command. 1 September 2015. This article incorporates text from this source, which is in the public domain.
- "Submarine Casualties Booklet". U.S. Naval Submarine School. 1966. Archived from the original on 11 September 2009.
- Blair, Clay Jr. (1975). Silent Victory. Philadelphia: Lippincott.
- Rear, Laura. "History of the USS S-Five Submarine". oceanexplorer.noaa.gov.
- Weirich, Jeremy B. LTJG. "How the NOAA Ship Whiting Found the USS S-Five". oceanexplorer.noaa.gov.
