= Charles M. Cooke Jr. =

United States admiral

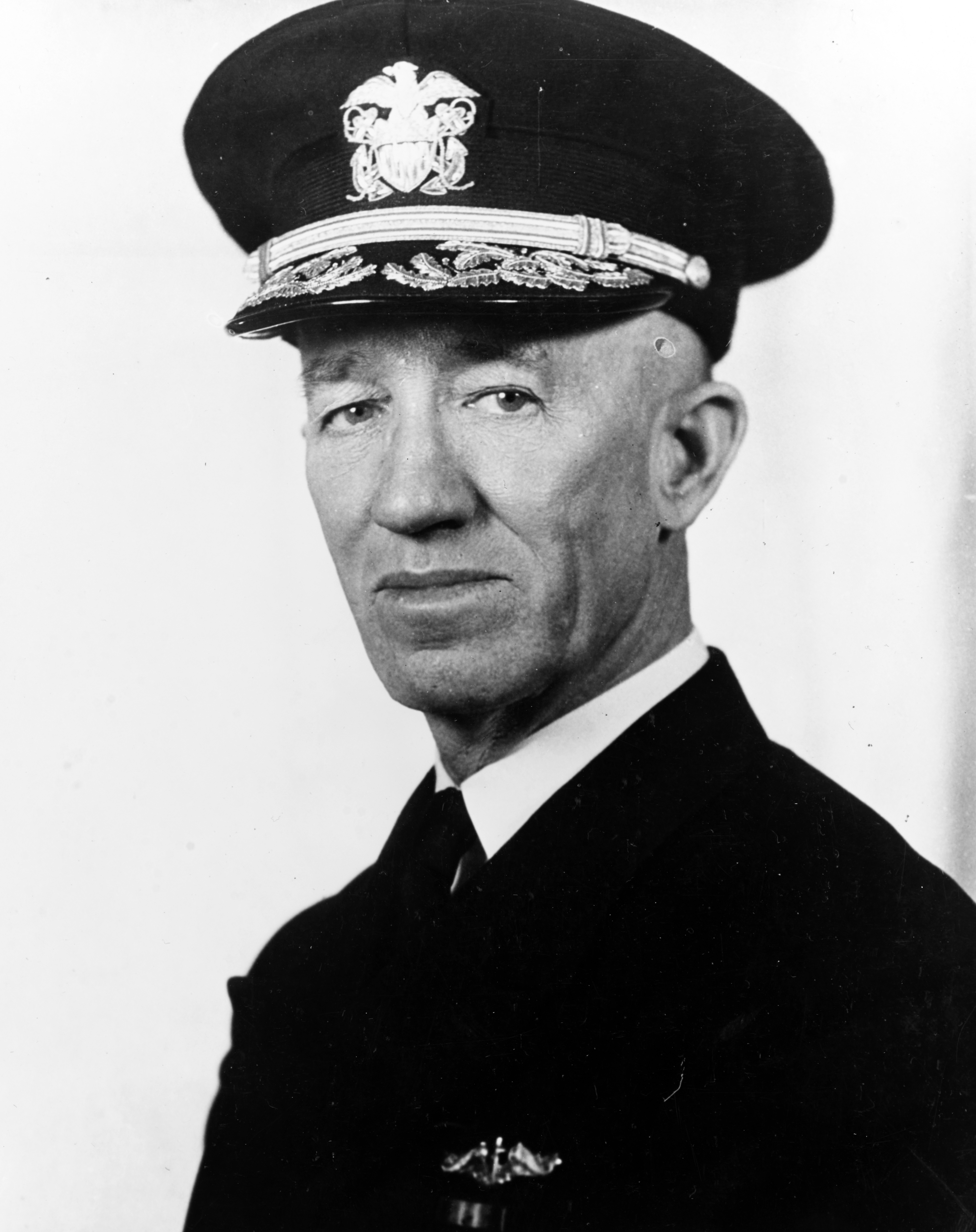
- Born: 19 December 1886; Fort Smith, Arkansas, U.S.
- Died: 24 December 1970 (aged 84); Palo Alto, California, U.S.
- Burial place: Arlington National Cemetery in Arlington, Virginia
- Military career
- Allegiance: United States of America
- Branch: United States Navy
- Service years: 1910–1948
- Rank: Admiral
- Nickname: "Savvy"
- Commands: USS E-2 (SS-25); USS R-2 (SS-79); USS S-5 (SS-110); Unidentified submarine division; Guantanamo Bay Naval Base; USS Pennsylvania (BB-38); United States Seventh Fleet; Naval Forces, Western Pacific
- Conflicts: World War I; World War II; Japanese attack on Pearl Harbor; Omaha Beach
- Awards: Navy Distinguished Service Medal

Charles Maynard "Savvy" Cooke Jr. (19 December 1886 – 24 December 1970), was a United States Navy admiral who saw service in World War I and World War II and later served as commander of United States Seventh Fleet from 1946 to 1947 and commander of U.S. Naval Forces, Western Pacific from 1947 to 1948.

== Biography ==
Cooke was born in Fort Smith, Arkansas, on 19 December 1886. In 1906, after receiving a degree from the University of Arkansas, he entered the United States Naval Academy, graduating second in the Class of 1910. Between then and 1913, during which time he was commissioned as an ensign, Cooke served in the battleships USS Connecticut, USS Maine, and USS Alabama. He then received submarine instruction and, as a lieutenant, junior grade, took command of the submarine USS E-2. From 1916 to 1918, he was assigned to shipyard inspection duty at Quincy, Massachusetts. Promoted to lieutenant in June 1917 and receiving a wartime temporary promotion to lieutenant commander in July 1918, he supervised the outfitting of the submarine USS R-2 and became her commanding officer when she was commissioned in January 1919.

In 1919 and 1920, Lieutenant Commander Cooke repeated the process for the larger submarine USS S-5 (SS-110), distinguishing himself when she accidentally sank on 1 September 1920 by saving the lives of 37 men trapped in her wreck. This is documented in A. J. Hill's book, "Under Pressure: The Final Voyage of Submarine S-5". During the remainder of the 1920s, he was executive officer of the submarine tender USS Rainbow (AS-7), had shore duty at the Cavite and Mare Island Navy Yards, was gunnery officer of the battleship USS Idaho (BB-42), and served at the United States Department of the Navy in Washington, D.C. From 1931 to 1933, Commander Cooke commanded a submarine division, attended the Naval War College Senior Course, was Commandant of the Guantanamo Bay Naval Base, had further Navy Department duty and was war plans and logistics officer with the United States Fleet staff.

Promoted to captain in June 1938, Cooke soon returned to Washington, D.C., for duty with the Chief of Naval Operations' war plans staff. He took command of the battleship USS Pennsylvania (BB-38) in February 1941, saw her through the 7 December 1941 Japanese attack on Pearl Harbor, Hawaii, that brought the United States into World War II, and remained with her into 1942.

By then a rear admiral, Cooke became the principal planning officer for Admiral Ernest J. King, who was both Commander in Chief, U.S. Fleet, and Chief of Naval Operations. He played a vital role on King's staff as a brilliant strategist until after the end of World War II in 1945, serving as Chief of Naval Plans and as Advocate for Naval Management of War in Pacific and working on issues related to the Navy's transition from a battleship-centered orientation to one focused on aircraft carrier task forces. He was present at Omaha Beach during the Allied invasion of Normandy on 6 June 1944, and finished the war as Deputy Chief of Naval Operations for Operations with the rank of vice admiral.

Between the end of 1945 and early 1948, as an admiral, Cooke commanded the Seventh Fleet and Naval Forces, Western Pacific, also serving as naval consultant to the Republic of China's leader, Generalissimo Chiang Kai-shek.

Cooke retired from the navy at the beginning of May 1948.

== Personal ==
Cooke's elder brother, John B. Cooke also served in the Navy and was elected to five terms in the California State Assembly. His younger brother, LCDR Stephen B. Cooke, USN, was killed in an airplane accident in 1941.

Cooke was married to the former Mary Louise Cooper (1887-1976). In retirement he made his home in Sonoma County, California.

== Death ==
Cooke died in Palo Alto, California, on 24 December 1970. He is buried at Arlington National Cemetery in Arlington, Virginia.
