= HMS Lucia =

British-built steamship

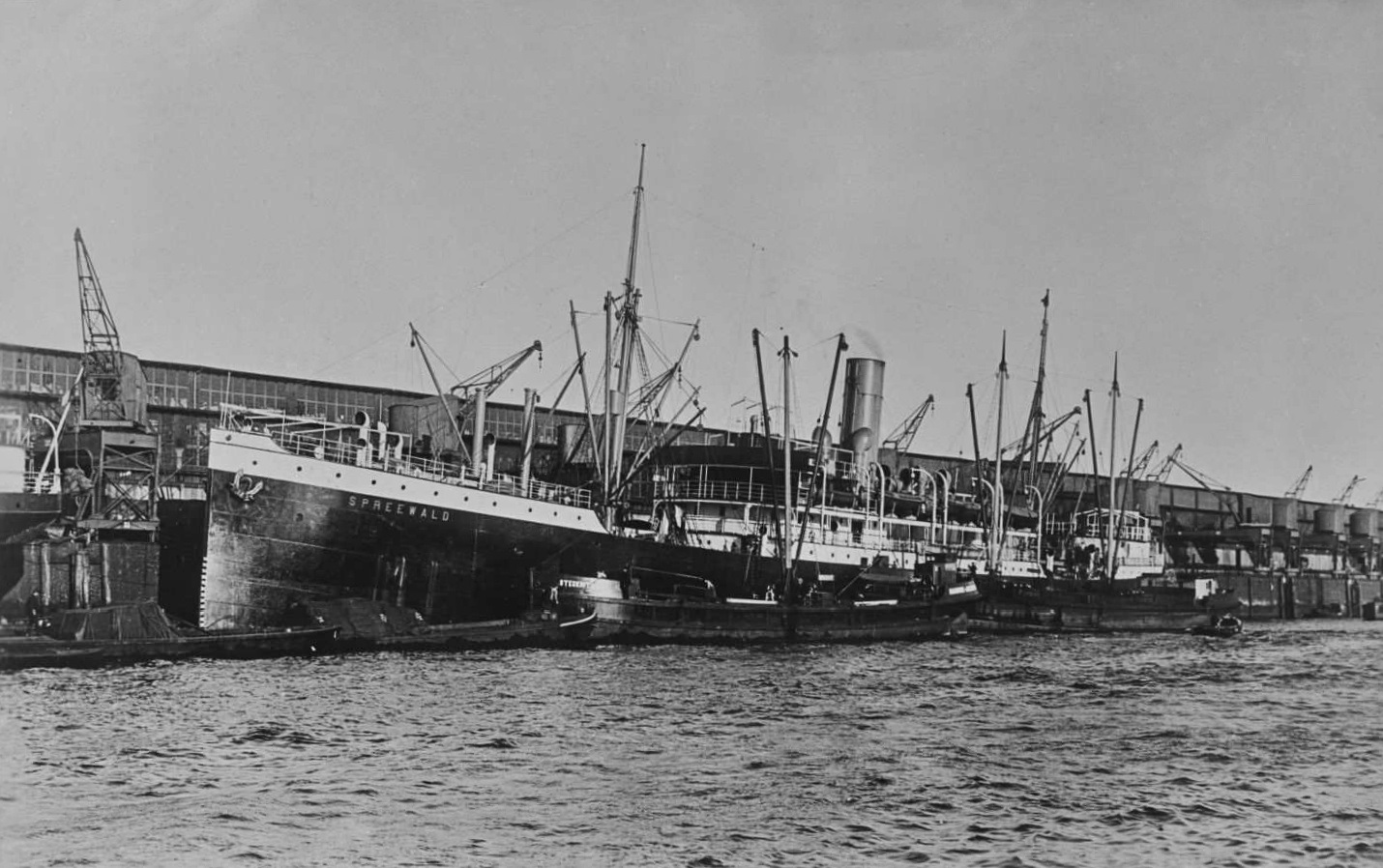
- The ship as Spreewald

History
- Name: 1908: Spreewald; 1915: Lucia; 1948: Sinai
- Namesake: 1908: Spreewald; 1915: Saint Lucia; 1948: Sinai
- Owner: 1908: Hamburg America Line; 1914: Admiralty; 1948: Cia Maritima Geojunior
- Operator: 1914: Elder Dempster Lines; 1916: (United Kingdom) Royal Navy; 1948: Till & Co
- Port of registry: 1908: (German Empire) Hamburg; 1915: (United Kingdom) London; 1948: Panama
- Route: 1913: Hamburg – Caribbean
- Builder: Furness, Withy, Middleton
- Yard number: 307
- Launched: 21 November 1907
- Completed: September 1908
- Identification: 1908: code letters RPWS; 1914: call sign DSO; 1915: UK official number 136789; 1915: code letters JKFV; 1916: pennant number F27; 1918: pennant number P.2A
- Fate: scrapped May 1951

General characteristics
- Type: 1908: passenger and cargo ship; 1916: submarine depôt ship; 1948: cargo ship
- Tonnage: 3,899 GRT, 2,414 NRT
- Length: 352.0 ft (107.3 m)
- Beam: 45.0 ft (13.7 m)
- Depth: 26.0 ft (7.9 m)
- Decks: 2
- Installed power: 359 NHP
- Propulsion: 1 × triple-expansion engine; 1 × screw
- Speed: 12 3/4 knots (24 km/h)
- Complement: in Royal Navy: 245
- Notes: sister ships: Westerwald, Frankenwald

HMS Lucia was a steamship that was launched in England in 1907 as the passenger and cargo ship Spreewald for Hamburg America Line (HAPAG)'s Caribbean services. The Royal Navy captured her in 1914, and renamed her Lucia. Elder Dempster Lines managed her until 1916, when she was converted into the submarine depôt ship HMS Lucia.

HMS Lucia served in home waters in the First World War, and in Malta and home waters between the wars. In the Second World War she served in the Indian Ocean, and in 1942 she was damaged in a Japanese air attack in Ceylon, the Easter Sunday Raid. Later in the war she was a repair ship for surface ships.

In 1946 Lucia was sold back into merchant service. By 1948 she had been converted into a cargo ship, renamed Sinai, and registered in Panama. She was scrapped in Italy in 1951.

This was the first of three HAPAG ships that were named after the Spreewald district of Lusatia. The second Spreewald was a motor ship that was completed in 1923 and sank in 1942. The third was a motor ship that was completed in 1951 and scrapped in 1979.

== Building ==
In 1907 and 1908 Furness, Withy & Co built three sister ships in Middleton, Hartlepool for HAPAG. Yard number 306 was launched on 22 October 1907 as Westerwald, and completed in July 1908. Yard number 307 was launched on 21 November 1907 as Spreewald, and completed in September 1908. Yard number 308 was launched on 20 January 1908 as Frankenwald, and completed in October 1908.

Spreewald's registered length was 352.0 ft (107.3 m), her beam was 45.0 ft (13.7 m), and her depth was 26.0 ft (7.9 m). Her tonnages were 3,899 GRT and 2,414 NRT. She had a single screw, driven by a three-cylinder triple-expansion steam engine built by Richardsons Westgarth & Company. It was rated at 359 NHP, and gave her a speed of up to 12 3/4 knots (24 km/h).

== Spreewald ==
HAPAG registered Spreewald at Hamburg. Her code letters were RPWS. By 1912 she was equipped with wireless telegraphy. By 1914 her call sign was DSO.

On 9 August 1913 Spreewald reached New Orleans carrying passengers from Tampico including 38 US refugees from the Mexican Revolution. On 2 February 1914 Spreewald reached San Juan, Puerto Rico from Europe. She discharged cargo, and embarked passengers for Sánchez, Puerto Plata, and Haiti.

== Capture ==
On 12 July 1914 Spreewald left Antwerp for the Caribbean. She was due to reach Puerto Rico on 1 or 2 August, and Saint Thomas in the Danish West Indies on 4 August. On 29 July she left Saint Croix, also in the Danish West Indies, bound for Puerto Rico, Santo Domingo and Haiti. Ultimately she was due to return to Hamburg.

However, at 11:00 hrs on 1 August 1914, with the First World War imminent, HAPAG announced the suspension of its services. Germany ordered its merchant ships to take refuge in the nearest German or neutral port. However, Spreewald found that she "could not communicate with Sánchez" in the Dominican Republic, and found a place called "Guanita" abandoned, so by 8 August she had returned to Saint Croix.

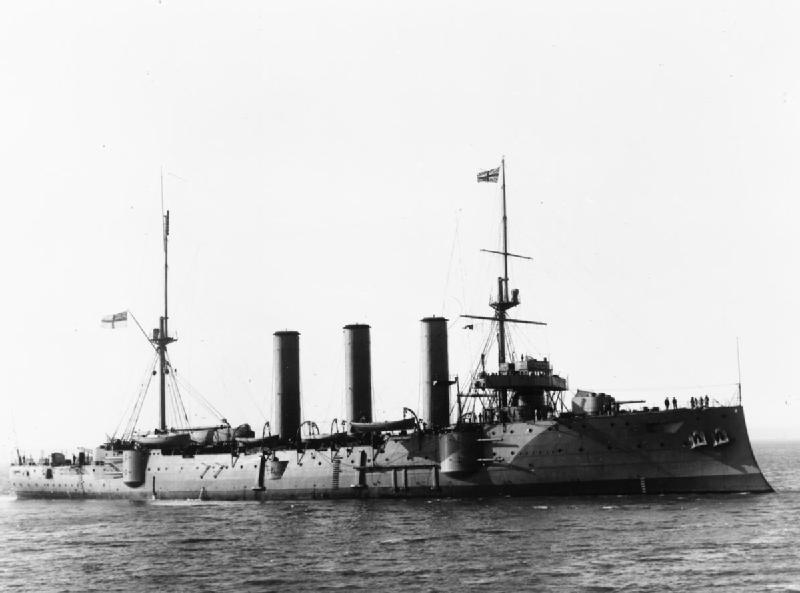
The cruiser HMS Berwick

At 15:37 hrs on the afternoon of 10 September, at position 10°39′N 56°50.5′W in the North Atlantic, the armoured cruiser HMS Berwick intercepted the New York and Porto Rico SS Co steamship Lorenzo, which HAPAG had chartered. Berwick put a boarding party aboard, and then at 16:20 hrs Berwick sighted Spreewald. Spreewald raised the ensign of the Imperial German Navy Naval Reserve, and Berwick closed on her.

At 17:14 hrs Spreewald hove to, and a party from Berwick boarded her. Spreewald's Master was taken prisoner and transferred to Berwick, and a prize crew took over Spreewald. Berwick escorted Lorenzo and Spreewald to Saint Lucia in the British West Indies. On 12 September the three ships reached Castries, where Berwick disembarked Spreewald's master as a prisoner of war.

== Lucia ==
The UK Admiralty assumed ownership of Spreewald, and renamed her Lucia after the island to which Berwick escorted her. In 1915 the Admiralty registered her in London as a merchant ship, with the UK official number 136789 and code letters JKFV. That January, the Admiralty appointed Elder, Dempster & Co to manage her.

In 1916 the Clyde Shipbuilding Company converted Lucia into a submarine depot ship. She was completed in August 1916. The Royal Navy commissioned her as HMS Lucia, with a complement of 245 officers and ratings. She served with the 10th Submarine Flotilla in the River Tees. Her tender was the naval trawler Repton. By January 1918 her pennant number was P.2A. She was decommissioned in 1918.

On 8 December 1919 Lucia was recommissioned. On 19 June 1920 there was an incident in which five members of her complement died: three petty officers, a leading seaman and an able seaman.

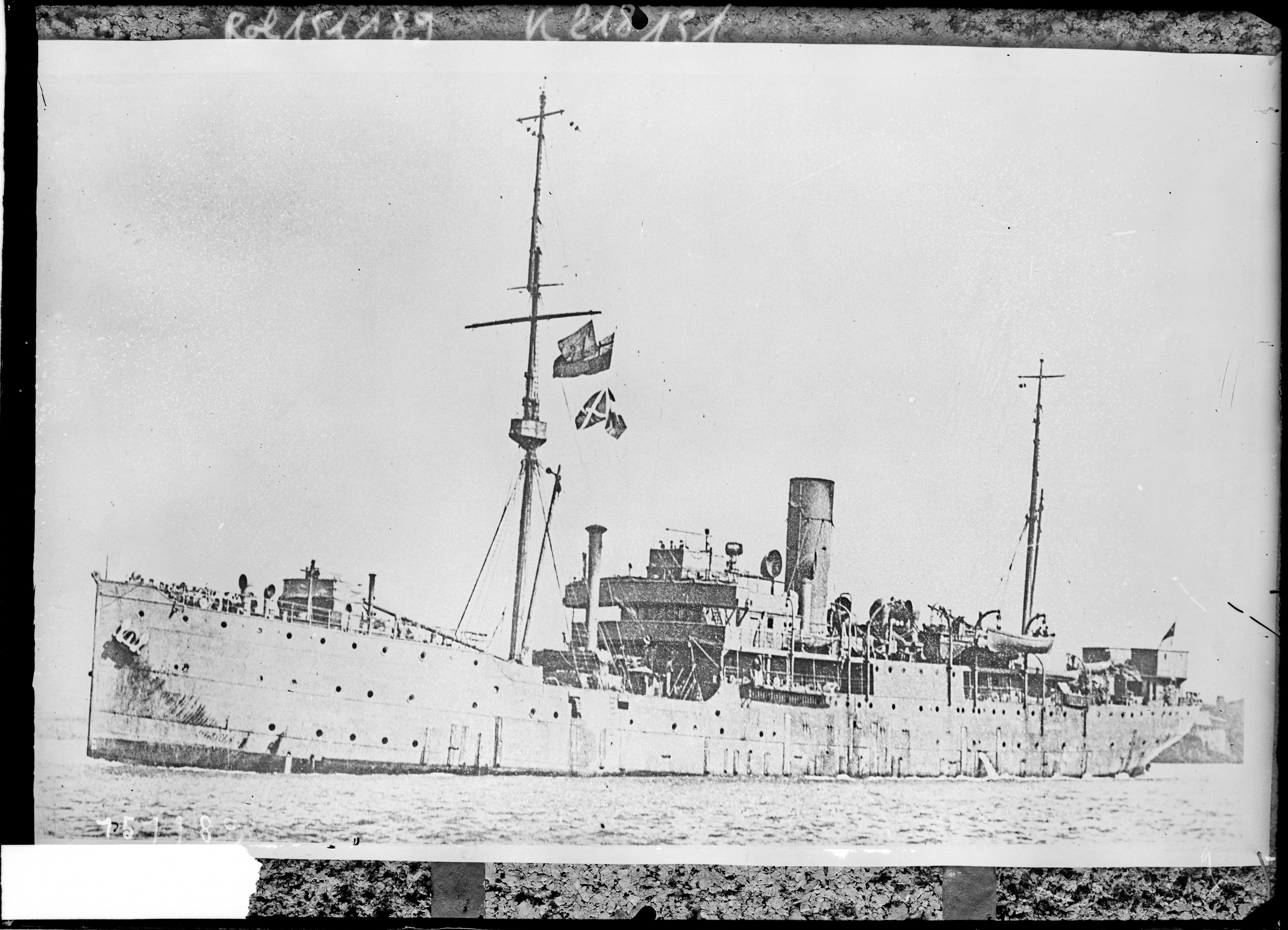
HMS Lucia

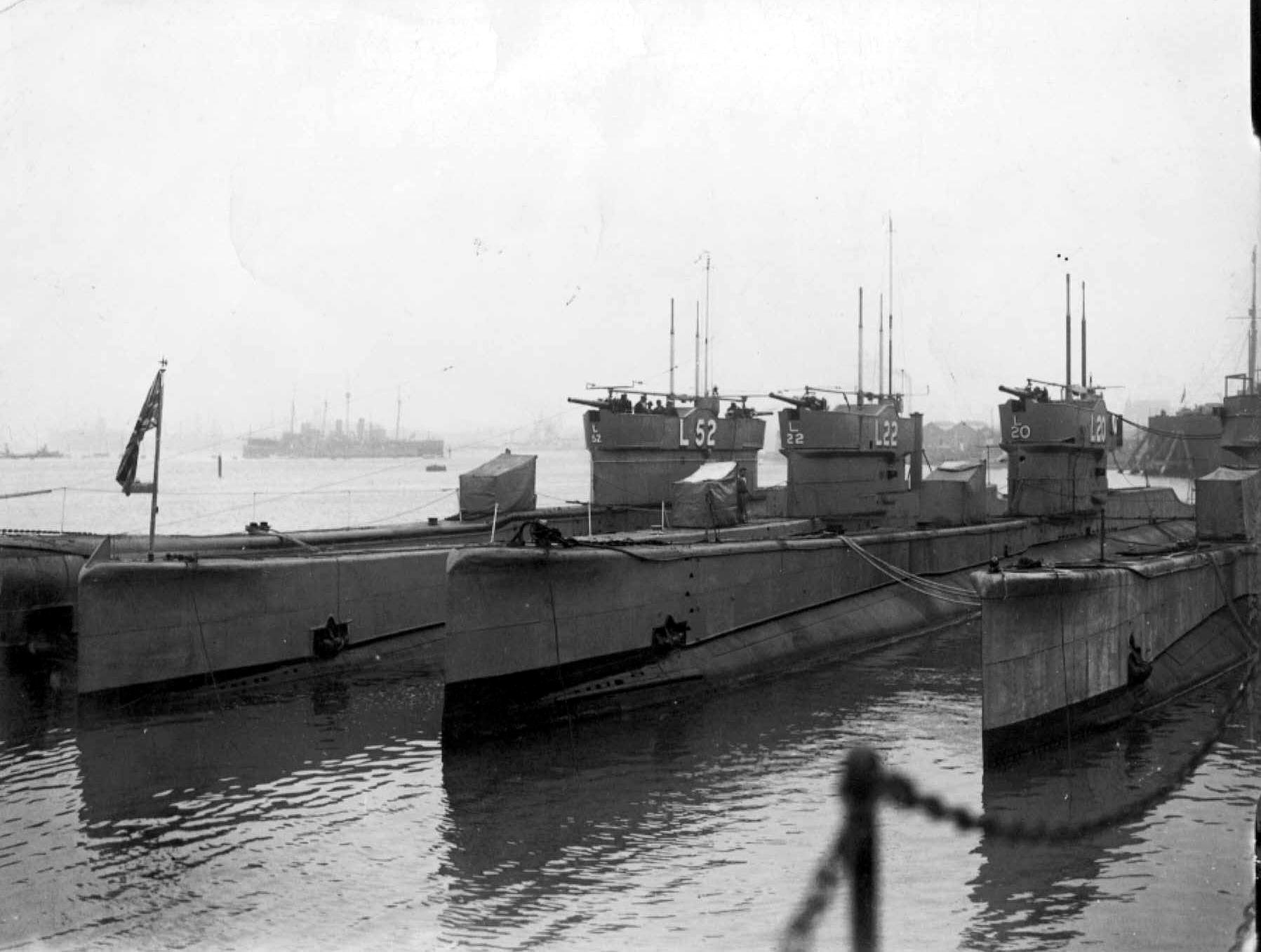
L-class submarines

From 1922 until 1936 Lucia was a depot ship for L-class submarines. On 26 October 1926 she and five L-class submarines of the 2nd Submarine Flotilla left Malta for Devonport, where they were due to arrive in 7 November. Lucia was paid off into dockyard control at Chatham Dockyard on 9 December.

On 4 January 1931, 30 members of Lucia's complement refused orders because bad weather and a forthcoming exercise had prevented them from being offered weekend leave. On 20 January four of the men were court-martialled for mutiny.

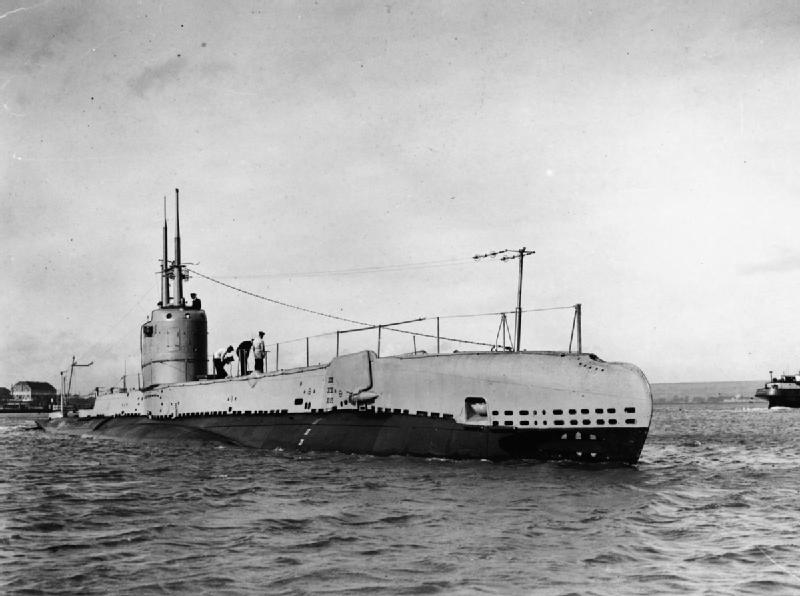
The S-class submarine HMS Seahorse

From 1936 to 1939 Lucia was a depot ship for mainly S-class submarines. By 8 September 1939 she was in the Indian Ocean. She was in Aden in February 1941, and Eritrea that April and August. On 5 January 1942 she left Bombay (now Mumbai) for Colombo, where she arrived five days later. In the Easter Sunday Raid on 5 April 1942, 70 dive bombers from Imperial Japanese Navy aircraft carriers attacked Colombo. Lucia was damaged, and one of her crew was killed.

Later in the war, Lucia became a "small ship" repair ship, serving ships up to the size of destroyers. She was in Colombo in December 1942 and March 1943. She visited Durban in August 1943, and Port Elizabeth that December. She was back in Colombo by June 1945.

== Sinai ==
The Admiralty sold Lucia on 4 September 1946. She was converted into a cargo ship and renamed Sinai. By 1948 the Compañía Maritima Geojunior had registered her under the Panamanian flag of convenience. An English firm, Till & Company, managed her. On 5 January 1951 she arrived in La Spezia to be scrapped.

== Bibliography ==
- Dittmar, FJ; Colledge, JJ (1972). British Warships 1914–1919. Shepperton: Ian Allan. ISBN 978-0711003804.
- Haws, Duncan (1980). The Ships of the Hamburg America, Adler and Carr Lines. Merchant Fleets in Profile. Vol. 4. Cambridge: Patrick Stephens Ltd. ISBN 0-85059-397-2.
- Haws, Duncan (1990). Elder Dempster Lines. Merchant Fleets. Vol. 20. Hereford: Travel Creatours Ltd Publications. ISBN 0-946378-17-7.
- Lloyd's Register of British and Foreign Shipping. Vol. I.–Steamers. London: Lloyd's Register of Shipping. 1911 – via Internet Archive.
- Lloyd's Register of British and Foreign Shipping. Vol. II.–Steamers. London: Lloyd's Register of Shipping. 1912 – via Internet Archive.
- The Marconi Press Agency Ltd (1914). The Year Book of Wireless Telegraphy and Telephony. London: The Marconi Press Agency Ltd.
- Mercantile Navy List. London. 1916 – via Crew List Index Project.
- Register Book. Vol. II.–M–Z. London: Lloyd's Register of Shipping. 1948 – via Internet Archive.
