= SS Frankenwald =

British-built steamship

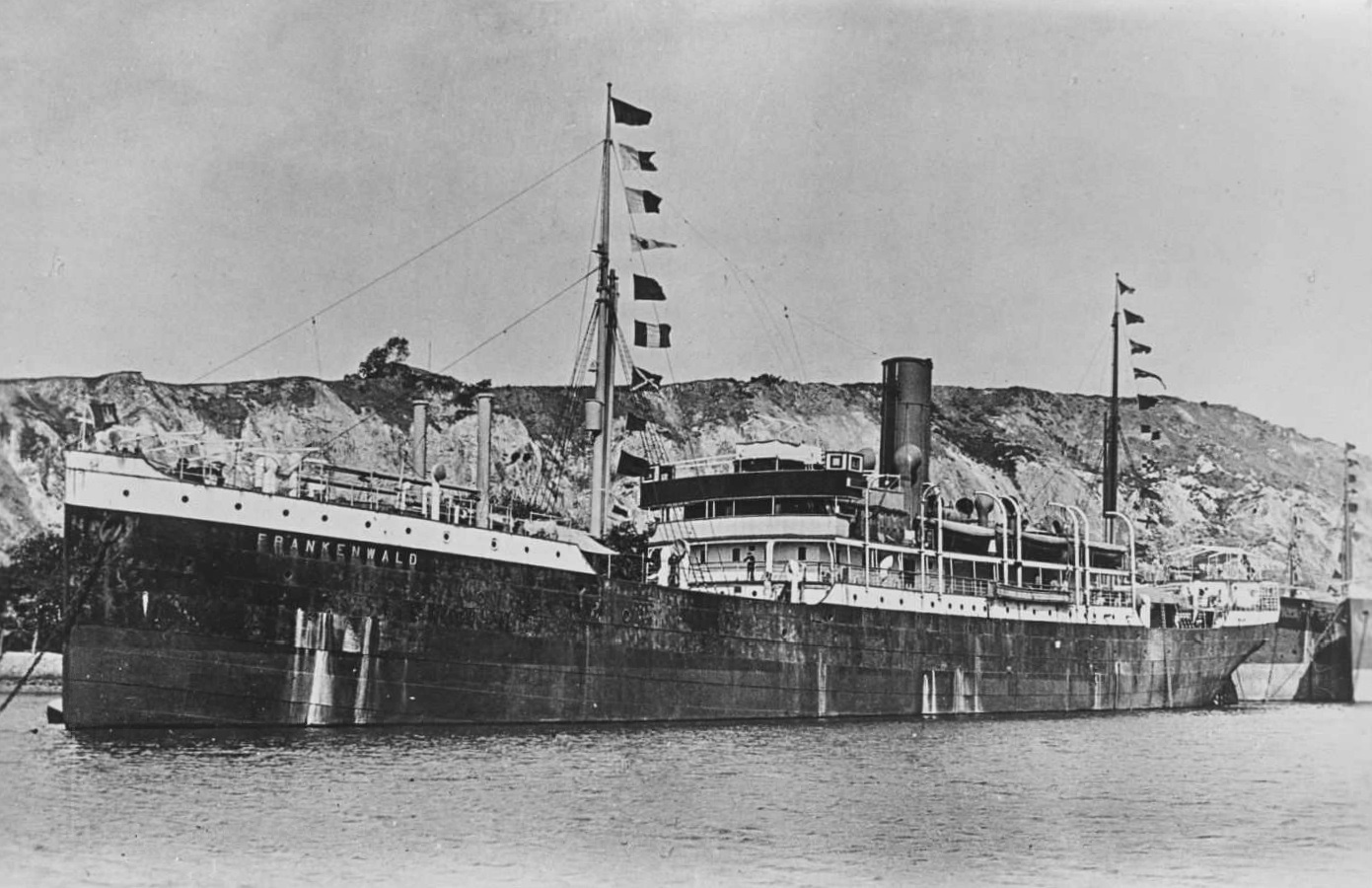
- Frankenwald at anchor

History
- Name: 1908: Frankenwald; 1920: Tadla; 1934: Tari
- Namesake: 1908: Frankenwald; 1920: Tadla
- Owner: 1908: Hamburg America Line; 1919: French Government; 1920: Cie de Navigation Paquet; 1934: Vapurculuk Turk AS; 1936: Denizyollari Idaresi; 1940: TC Münakalât Vekâleti Devlet Denizyollari Isletme UM; 1952: Denizcilik Bankasi TAO
- Port of registry: 1908: (German Empire) Hamburg; 1920: (France) Marseille; 1934: (Turkey) Istanbul
- Builder: Furness, Withy, Middleton
- Yard number: 308
- Launched: 20 January 1908
- Completed: October 1908
- Identification: 1908: code letters RQBK; 1914: call sign DFD; 1919: code letters OUBE; 1934: call sign TCEO
- Fate: scrapped 1967

General characteristics
- Type: passenger and cargo ship
- Tonnage: 3,898 GRT, 2,391 NRT
- Length: 352.1 ft (107.3 m)
- Beam: 45.1 ft (13.7 m)
- Depth: 26.0 ft (7.9 m)
- Decks: 2
- Installed power: 359 NHP
- Propulsion: 1 × triple-expansion engine; 1 × screw
- Speed: 10 knots (19 km/h)
- Notes: sister ships: Westerwald, Spreewald

SS Frankenwald was a passenger and cargo steamship that was launched in England in 1908 for Hamburg America Line. In 1919 France seized her as part of Germany's World War I reparations. In 1920 the Compagnie de Navigation Paquet bought her and renamed her Tadla. A Turkish shipowner bought her in 1934 and renamed her Tari. She passed through a succession of Turkish owners, and was scrapped in 1967.

This was the first of two HAPAG ships called Frankenwald. The second was built in Germany in 1922 and wrecked in Norway in 1940.

== Building ==
In 1907 and 1908 Furness, Withy & Co built three sister ships in Middleton, Hartlepool for HAPAG. Yard number 306 was launched on 22 October 1907 as Westerwald, and completed in July 1908. Yard number 307 was launched on 21 November 1907 as Spreewald, and completed in September 1908. Yard number 308 was launched on 20 January 1908 as Frankenwald, and completed in October 1908.

Frankenwald's registered length was 352.1 ft (107.3 m), her beam was 45.1 ft (13.7 m), and her depth was 26.0 ft (7.9 m). Her tonnages were 3,838 GRT and 2,391 NRT. She had a single screw, driven by a three-cylinder triple-expansion steam engine built by Richardsons Westgarth & Company. It was rated at 359 NHP, and gave her a speed of 10 knots (19 km/h).

== Frankenwald ==
HAPAG registered Frankenwald at Hamburg. Her code letters were RQBK. By 1912 she was equipped with wireless telegraphy. By 1914 her call sign was DFD.

== Tadla ==
In 1919 HAPAG surrendered Frankenwald to the French government under Article 231 of the Treaty of Versailles. In 1920 the Compagnie de Navigation Paquet bought her, renamed her Tadla, and registered her in Marseille. Her code letters were OUBE. Cie de Navigation Paquet operated cargo and passenger services to and from Morocco, other parts of French West Africa, and the Canary Islands.

== Tari ==
In 1934 Vapurculuk Turk Anonym Sirketi bought Tadla, renamed her Tari, and registered her in Istanbul. In 1936 her ownership passed to Denizyollari Idaresi, and her call sign was TCEO. Her ownership changed again to TC Münakalât Vekâleti Devlet Denizyollari Isletme UM in 1940, and Denizcilik Bankasi TAO in 1952.

Tari was scrapped in Halič in Istanbul in 1967. Work to break her up started on 17 March 1967.

== Bibliography ==
- Haws, Duncan (1980). The Ships of the Hamburg America, Adler and Carr Lines. Merchant Fleets in Profile. Vol. 4. Cambridge: Patrick Stephens Ltd. ISBN 0-85059-397-2.
- Lloyd's Register of British and Foreign Shipping. Vol. II.–Steamers. London: Lloyd's Register of Shipping. 1911 – via Internet Archive.
- Lloyd's Register of British and Foreign Shipping. Vol. II.–Steamers. London: Lloyd's Register of Shipping. 1912 – via Internet Archive.
- Lloyd's Register of Shipping. Vol. II.–Steamers. London: Lloyd's Register of Shipping. 1920 – via Internet Archive.
- Lloyd's Register of Shipping. Vol. II.–Steamers. London: Lloyd's Register of Shipping. 1921 – via Internet Archive.
- Lloyd's Register of Shipping (PDF). Vol. II.–Steamers and Motorships of 300 tons gross and over. London: Lloyd's Register of Shipping. 1934 – via Southampton City Council.
- Lloyd's Register of Shipping (PDF). Vol. II.–Steamers and Motorships of 300 tons gross and over. London: Lloyd's Register of Shipping. 1936 – via Southampton City Council.
- Lloyd's Register of Shipping (PDF). Vol. II.–Steamers and Motorships of 300 tons gross and over. London: Lloyd's Register of Shipping. 1940 – via Southampton City Council.
- The Marconi Press Agency Ltd (1914). The Year Book of Wireless Telegraphy and Telephony. London: The Marconi Press Agency Ltd.
- Register Book. Vol. II.–M–Z. London: Lloyd's Register of Shipping. 1952 – via Internet Archive.
