= SS Lima =

British-built steamship

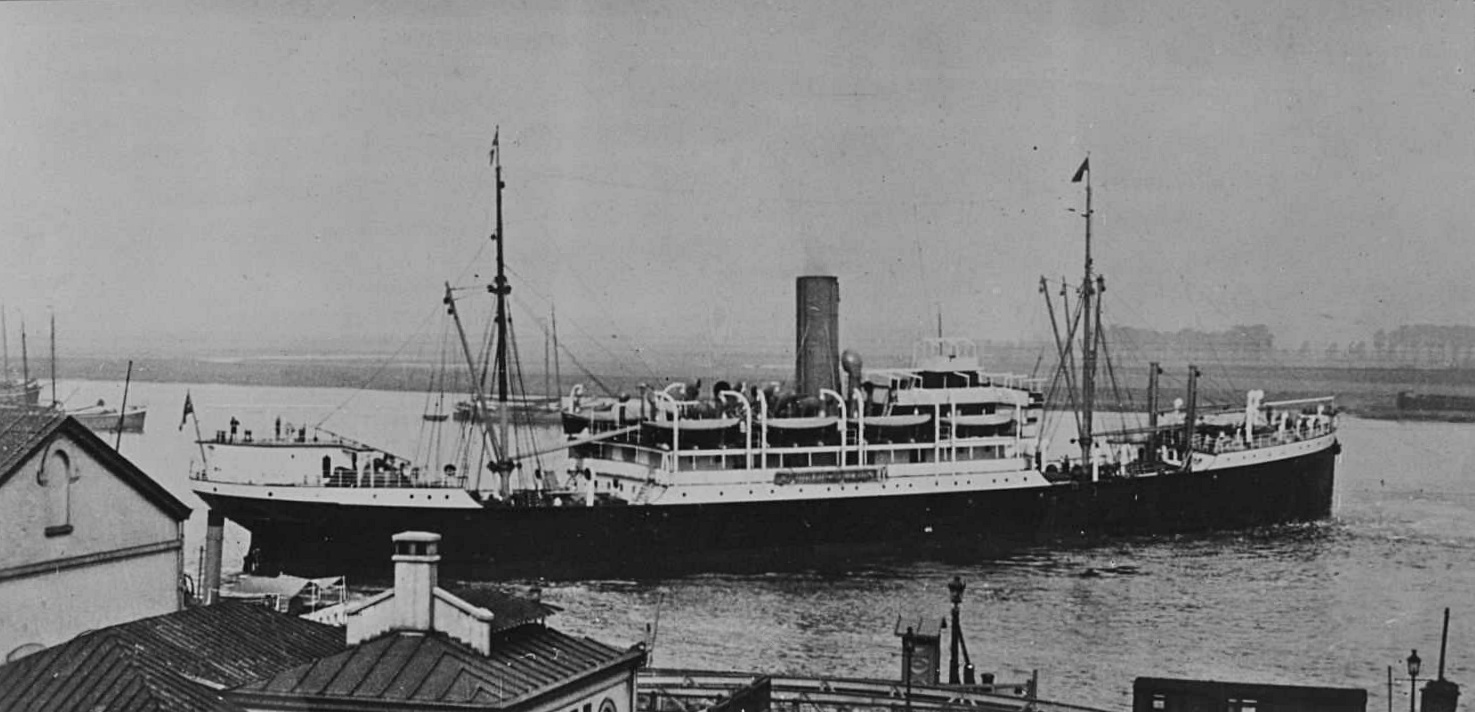
- The ship as Westerwald

History
- Name: 1908: Westerwald; 1916: Lima
- Namesake: 1908: Westerwald
- Owner: 1908: Hamburg America Line; 1916: Government of Portugal; 1926: Empresa Insulana de Nav
- Operator: 1916: Transportes Mar do Estado; 1926: Bensaude & Cia
- Port of registry: 1908: (German Empire) Hamburg; 1916: (Portugal) Lisbon
- Route: 1908: Hamburg – Caribbean; 1912: New York – Cartagena; 1926: Lisbon – Azores – Madeira
- Builder: Furness, Withy, Middleton
- Yard number: 306
- Launched: 22 October 1907
- Completed: July 1908
- Identification: 1908: code letters RPWH; 1914: call sign DWE; 1919: code letters HLIM; 1934: call sign CSAZ
- Fate: scrapped December 1969

General characteristics
- Type: passenger and cargo ship
- Tonnage: 3,901 GRT, 2,390 NRT
- Length: 352.1 ft (107.3 m)
- Beam: 45.1 ft (13.7 m)
- Depth: 26.0 ft (7.9 m)
- Decks: 2
- Installed power: 359 NHP
- Propulsion: 1 × triple-expansion engine; 1 × screw
- Speed: 11 knots (20 km/h)
- Sensors & processing systems: by 1942: echo sounding device
- Notes: sister ships: Spreewald, Frankenwald

SS Lima was a passenger and cargo steamship that was launched in England in 1907 as Westerwald for Hamburg America Line (HAPAG)'s Caribbean services. Portugal seized her in 1916, renamed her Lima, and used her as a troopship. By 1926 the Empresa Insulana de Navegação (EIN) had bought her for its service to Madeira and the Azores. She was scrapped in Portugal in 1969.

She was the first of two HAPAG ships that were called Westerwald. The second was launched in 1921 and sunk in 1940. She was also the first of two EIN ships that were called Lima. The second was a Danish ship that was built in 1966, and which EIN bought and renamed Lima in 1972.

== Building ==
In 1907 and 1908 Furness, Withy & Co built three sister ships in Middleton, Hartlepool for HAPAG. Yard number 306 was launched on 22 October 1907 as Westerwald, and completed in July 1908. Yard number 307 was launched on 21 November 1907 as Spreewald, and completed in September 1908. Yard number 308 was launched on 20 January 1908 as Frankenwald, and completed in October 1908.

Westerwald's registered length was 352.1 ft (107.3 m), her beam was 45.1 ft (13.7 m), and her depth was 26.0 ft (7.9 m). Her tonnages were 3,901 GRT and 2,390 NRT. She had a single screw, driven by a three-cylinder triple-expansion steam engine built by Richardsons Westgarth & Company. It was rated at 359 NHP, and gave her a speed of 11 knots (20 km/h).

== Westerwald ==
HAPAG registered Westerwald at Hamburg. Her code letters were RPWH. By 1912 she was equipped with wireless telegraphy. By 1914 her call sign was DWE.

HAPAG ran a service between Denmark, Germany, and the Danish West Indies, using ships including St. Croix, St. Jan and St. Thomas, which it had bought from the Østasiatiske Kompagni (ØK) and renamed Sachsenwald, Odenwald, and Niederwald. By October 1908 Westerwald had joined this route, with ports of call including San Juan, Puerto Rico. There are records from 1910 of her calling at Saint Croix as well as San Juan.

By 1912 Westerwald was on HAPAG's Atlas Service between New York and the Caribbean. Her ports of call included Philadelphia, Inagua, Jamaica, and Port-au-Prince. HAPAG advertised that for the season from September 1912 to January 1913 Westerwald's route was between New York and Cartagena in Colombia. On outward voyages she was to call at Inagua, Saint-Marc, Port-au-Prince, Petit-Goâve, Miragoâne, and Jacmel. On return voyages she was to call at Puerto Colombia, Santa Marta, Jérémie, Port-au-Prince, and Inagua. Westerwald remained on this route until at least the end of March 1913.

In April 1913 HAPAG advertised that on 10 May Westerwald was to sail direct from New York to Hamburg. That transatlantic crossing was Westerwald's departure from the Atlas Service.

At 11:00 hrs on 1 August 1914, with the First World War imminent, HAPAG announced the suspension of its services. Germany ordered its merchant ships to take refuge in the nearest German or neutral port. Portugal was neutral, despite its long alliance with the United Kingdom, so from 4 August Westerwald sheltered in Lisbon.

== Seizure ==
On 23 February 1916, the commander of the Portuguese Navy division in Lisbon seized 36 German and Austro-Hungarian merchant ships that had been sheltering in the Tagus. Portugal denied that this was an act of war, and declared that it would respect the rights of German shipowners. Portugal stated that it had requisitioned the ships "in the public interest", for the "necessities of the nation's economic situation". It had not confiscated the ships, and they would be converted for "transport and other purposes".

On 25 February Portugal seized eight German ships in São Vicente, Cape Verde, and announced that it intended to requisition German and Austro-Hungarian ships in other ports in Portugal and the Portuguese Empire. On 28 February, a German diplomatic note to Portugal protested that the seizure of the ships violated German treaty rights. By 3 March, Portugal had seized all German ships in Mormugão in Goa. On 9 March, Germany declared war on Portugal.

== Lima ==
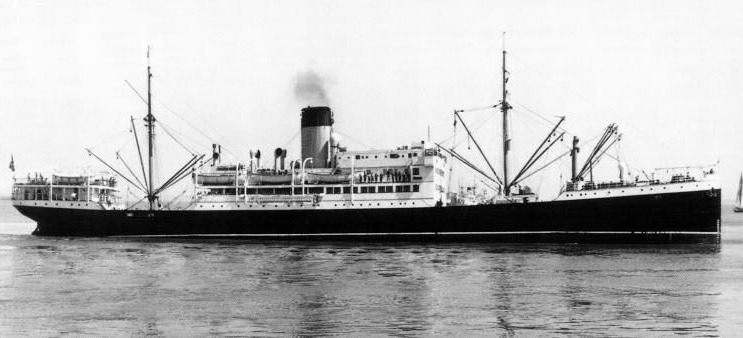
The ship as Lima

Westerwald was renamed Lima and registered in Lisbon. She was used to take troops to and from Madeira and the Azores. By 1919 her code letters were HLIM.

By 1926 the Portuguese government had sold Lima to the EIN, which was part of Bensaude & Companhia. EIN operated scheduled services between Lisbon, the Azores, Madeira, and the Canary Islands.

By 1934 Lima's wireless call sign was CSAZ, and this had superseded her code letters. By 1942 her navigation equipment included an echo sounding device.

On 23 June 1942 U-84 sank the Norwegian steamship Torvanger in the North Atlantic. Some of the survivors reached Faial in the Azores in two boats on 5 July. They embarked on Lima on 5 July, and disambarked in Lisbon nine days later.

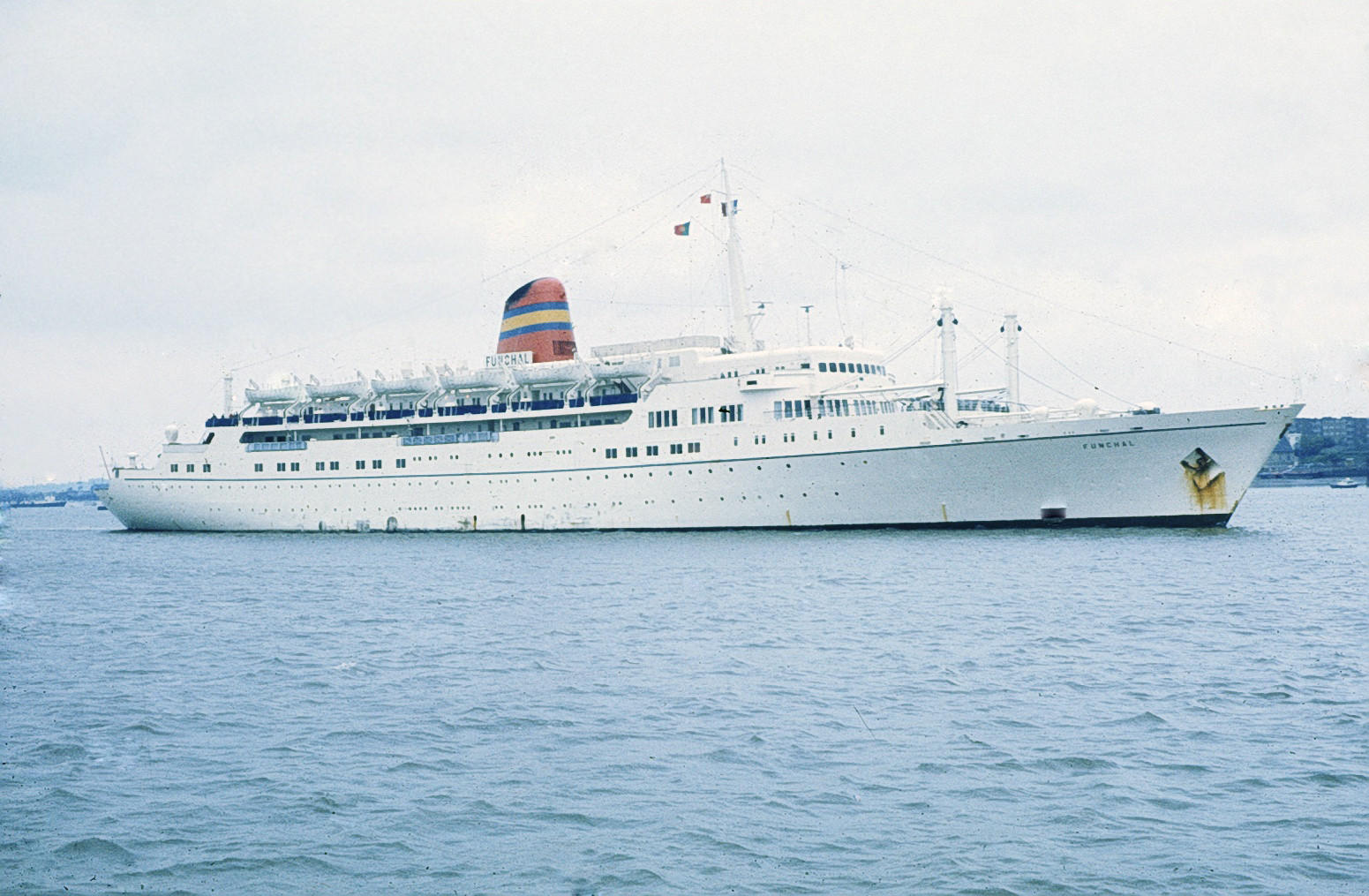
Funchal in 1977

In November 1961 the new motor ship Funchal joined Lima on EIN's Lisbon – Azores – Madeira service. Lima was scrapped in Lisbon in December 1969.

== Bibliography ==
- Haws, Duncan (1980). The Ships of the Hamburg America, Adler and Carr Lines. Merchant Fleets in Profile. Vol. 4. Cambridge: Patrick Stephens Ltd. ISBN 0-85059-397-2.
- Lloyd's Register of British and Foreign Shipping. Vol. II.–Steamers. London: Lloyd's Register of Shipping. 1911 – via Internet Archive.
- Lloyd's Register of British and Foreign Shipping. Vol. II.–Steamers. London: Lloyd's Register of Shipping. 1912 – via Internet Archive.
- Lloyd's Register of Shipping. Vol. II.–Steamers. London: Lloyd's Register of Shipping. 1917 – via Internet Archive.
- Lloyd's Register of Shipping. Vol. II.–Steamers. London: Lloyd's Register of Shipping. 1919 – via Internet Archive.
- Lloyd's Register of Shipping. Vol. II.–Steamers and Motorships. London: Lloyd's Register of Shipping. 1926 – via Internet Archive.
- Lloyd's Register of Shipping (PDF). Vol. II.–Steamers and Motorships of 300 tons gross and over. London: Lloyd's Register of Shipping. 1934 – via Southampton City Council.
- Lloyd's Register of Shipping (PDF). Vol. II.–Steamers and Motorships of 300 tons gorss and over. London: Lloyd's Register of Shipping. 1942 – via Southampton City Council.
- The Marconi Press Agency Ltd (1914). The Year Book of Wireless Telegraphy and Telephony. London: The Marconi Press Agency Ltd.
