= USS Kermoor =

Cargo steamship that served in the US Navy

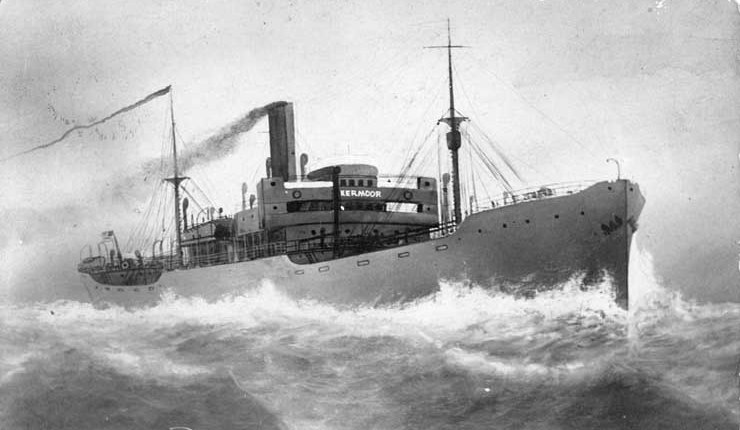
- Painting by an unknown artist of USS Kermoor under way in March 1919

History
- Name: 1907: Morawitz; 1917: Kermoor; 1922: Morawitz; 1927: Purley Oaks
- Namesake: 1927: Purley Oaks
- Owner: 1907: "Atlantica" SN Co, Ltd; 1917: Kerr Navigation Corp; 1920: American S&C Corp; 1922: Oceana Sea Nav Co, Ltd; 1927: TE Evans & Co, Ltd
- Operator: March 1918: US Army; November 1918: US Navy
- Port of registry: 1911: (Austria-Hungary) Fiume; 1917: (United States) New York; 1922: (Hungary) Budapest; 1927: (United Kingdom) London
- Builder: JL Thompson & Sons, Sunderland
- Yard number: 460
- Launched: 11 June 1907
- Completed: 27 July 1907
- Commissioned: into US Navy, 1 November 1918
- Decommissioned: from US Navy, 5 May 1919
- Identification: 1907: code letters JMVG; 1911: US official number 215398; 1911: code letters LHPG; 1922: code letters JZBH; 1927: UK official number 149786; 1930: call sign GMZP
- Fate: scrapped, 1936

General characteristics
- Type: cargo steamship
- Tonnage: 4,795 GRT, 3,106 NRT
- Length: 378.1 ft (115.2 m)
- Beam: 52.3 ft (15.9 m)
- Draft: 22 ft 6 in (6.86 m)
- Depth: 24.4 ft (7.4 m)
- Decks: 1
- Installed power: 1 × triple-expansion engine, 1,960 ihp, 392 NHP
- Propulsion: 1 × screw
- Speed: 9 knots (17 km/h)
- Complement: in US Navy: 67
- Armament: 1918: 1 × 3-inch/50-caliber gun
- Notes: sister ship: Kossuth Ferencz

USS Kermoor was a cargo steamship. She was built in England in 1907 as Morawitz for an Austro-Hungarian shipping company. The US interned her in 1914. In 1917 the US seized her, and sold her to the Kerr Navigation Corporation, who renamed her Kermoor. The US Army took her over in March 1918. The United States Navy requisitioned her in November 1918, and commissioned her as USS Kerwood. She was decommissioned in and returned to her owner in May 1919. The American Shipping and Commerce Corporation bought her in 1921. A Hungarian company bought her in 1922, and reverted her name to Morawitz. A UK company bought her in 1927, and changed her name to Purley Oaks. She was scrapped in Scotland in 1936.

== Morawitz and her sisters ==
In 1907, J. L. Thompson and Sons of Sunderland, on the River Wear in North East England, built a pair of cargo ships for the "Atlantica" Steam Navigation Co, Ltd of Fiume in Austria-Hungary (now Rijeka in Croatia). Yard number 459 was launched on 29 April 1907 as Kossuth Ferencz. Yard number 460 was launched on 11 June that year as Morawitz, and completed on 27 July.

In 1911, Armstrong, Whitworth & Co, Ltd of Low Walker on the River Tyne built a second pair of sister ships for "Atlantica" to the same dimensions. Yard number 832 was launched on 15 February 1911 as Gróf Khuen Héderváry, and yard number 833 was launched on 12 April that year as Atlantica.

Morawitz's registered length was 378.1 ft (115.2 m), her beam was 52.3 ft (15.9 m), her depth was 24.4 ft (7.4 m), and her draft was 22 ft 6 in (6.86 m). Her tonnages were 4,795 GRT and 3,106 NRT. She had a single screw, driven by a three-cylinder triple-expansion engine built by Blair & Co, Ltd of Stockton. It was rated at 392 NHP, or 1,960 ihp, and gave her a speed of 9 knots (17 km/h). "Atlantica" registered her at Fiume. Her code letters were JMVG.

== Internment ==
When the First World War began on 3 August 1914, Morawitz was at sea. On 17 August, she reached Galveston, Texas. She claimed that three Royal Navy cruisers chased her near Barbados, but she escaped in darkness. She was one of 14 Austro-Hungarian merchant ships that took refuge in US ports, and one of two in Galveston. The other was D Tripcović's cargo ship Campania. By 18 August 1916, Campania been towed upriver to the turning basin of the Houston Ship Channel. On 1 September, Morawitz followed her.

== Seizure ==
At the beginning of February 1917, the Major commanding the coastal artillery near Galveston inquired into the condition of Campania and Morawitz. He refused to give any details as to the nature of his orders.

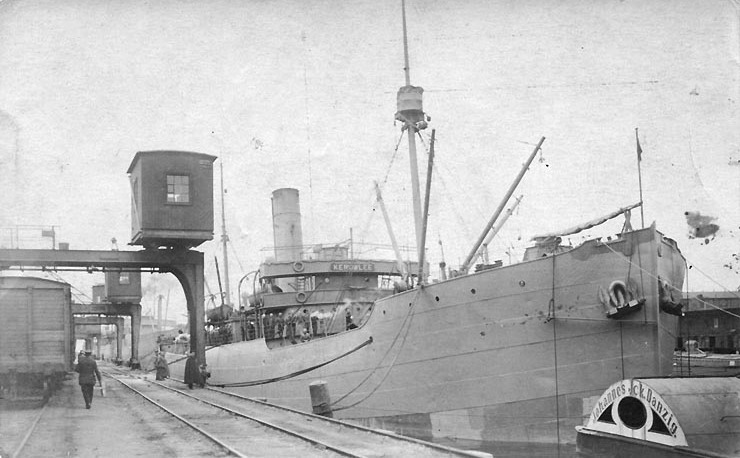
USS Kerowlee, formerly D Tripcović's Campania, in 1919

On 6 April 1917, the US declared war against Germany, and seized all German ships in its ports. The US did not declare war against Austria-Hungary, so the 14 Austro-Hungarian ships in US ports were not seized. However, two days later, Austria-Hungary terminated diplomatic relations with the US, so the US responded by seizing all of those Austro-Hungarian ships. Late on the afternoon of 9 April, US deputy marshals seized both Campania and Morawitz, and took their masters and crews to the immigration headquarters on Pelican Island. The boilers of both ships were found to have been disabled. Their masters, Captain Rakos of Morowitz and Captain Lupis of Campania, said they had been ordered to disable their ships' machinery. By 25 May, Morawitz had been towed from the turning basin back to Galveston, and Campania was to follow.

== Kermoor ==
By August 1917, the Kerr Navigation Corporation had bought Morawitz. She was one of eight Austro-Hungarian cargo ships that Kerr bought; with a combined tonnage of almost 57,000 GRT; for a total of $12 million. They included another "Atlantica" ship, Budapest, which was in Newport News. Kerr renamed its acquisitions, and registered them in New York. Budapest became Kerwood. Morawitz became Kermoor, and was given the US official number 215398, and code letters LHPG. By 15 August, those ships which had been damaged by their crews had been repaired, and Kerr was using them in transatlantic trade.

On 14 March 1918, the US Army took over Kermoor from her owner. She was defensively armed with one 3-inch/50-caliber gun. On 1 November, she was at Cardiff in Wales, when the US Navy requisitioned her. She was commissioned with Lieutenant Commander T Cartwright, USNRF, as her commanding officer. Unusually, she was not given a Naval Registry Identification Number. She carried coal and military supplies between Britain and France until 1 March 1919, when she was detached from English Channel service, and sailed for Queenstown (now Cobh), Ireland. On 6 March, she left Queenstown with a cargo of military stores. She reached Baltimore, Maryland on 27 March, where she left for New York on 21 April. She reached New York on 23 April, and discharged her cargo. She was decommissioned on 5 May, and returned via the United States Shipping Board to her owner on the same day.

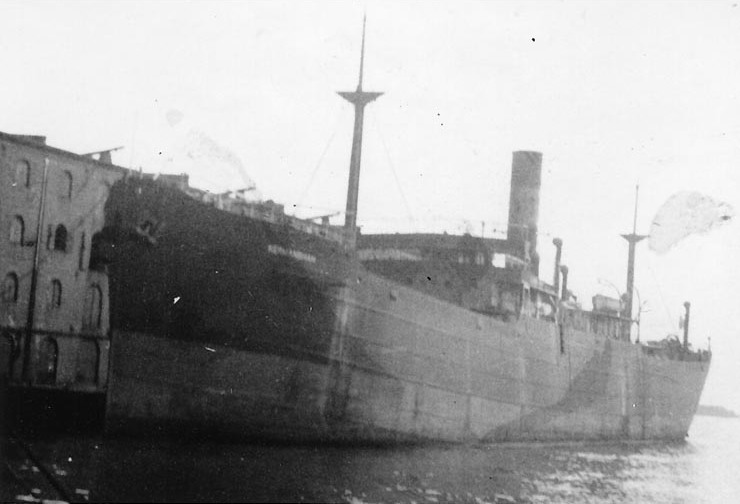
Kerr's Kermanshah

Kermoor was one of at least six Kerr ships that continued to trade between the US and Hamburg in 1920, in partnership with Hamburg America Line. The others were Keresan, Kerlew, Kermanshah, Kerowlee, and Kerkenna. In Germany and Austria, the population was recovering from hardships caused by the Entente blockade of the Central Powers. In February 1920, the American Merchants Shipping & Forwarding Co advertised a service for people to send "Self-packed food and clothing boxes" to Germany via various steamships, including Kerr's Kerkenna and Kermoor.

In October 1920, United American Lines acquired ten Kerr ships, including Kermoor. The ships continued a weekly cargo service between Hamburg and New York, and also a service between Hamburg and the Río de la Plata, via ports in Brazil. Keresan went to Rosario and Buenos Aires in Argentina, and left Buenos Aires on 20 December.

== Morawitz and Purley Oaks ==
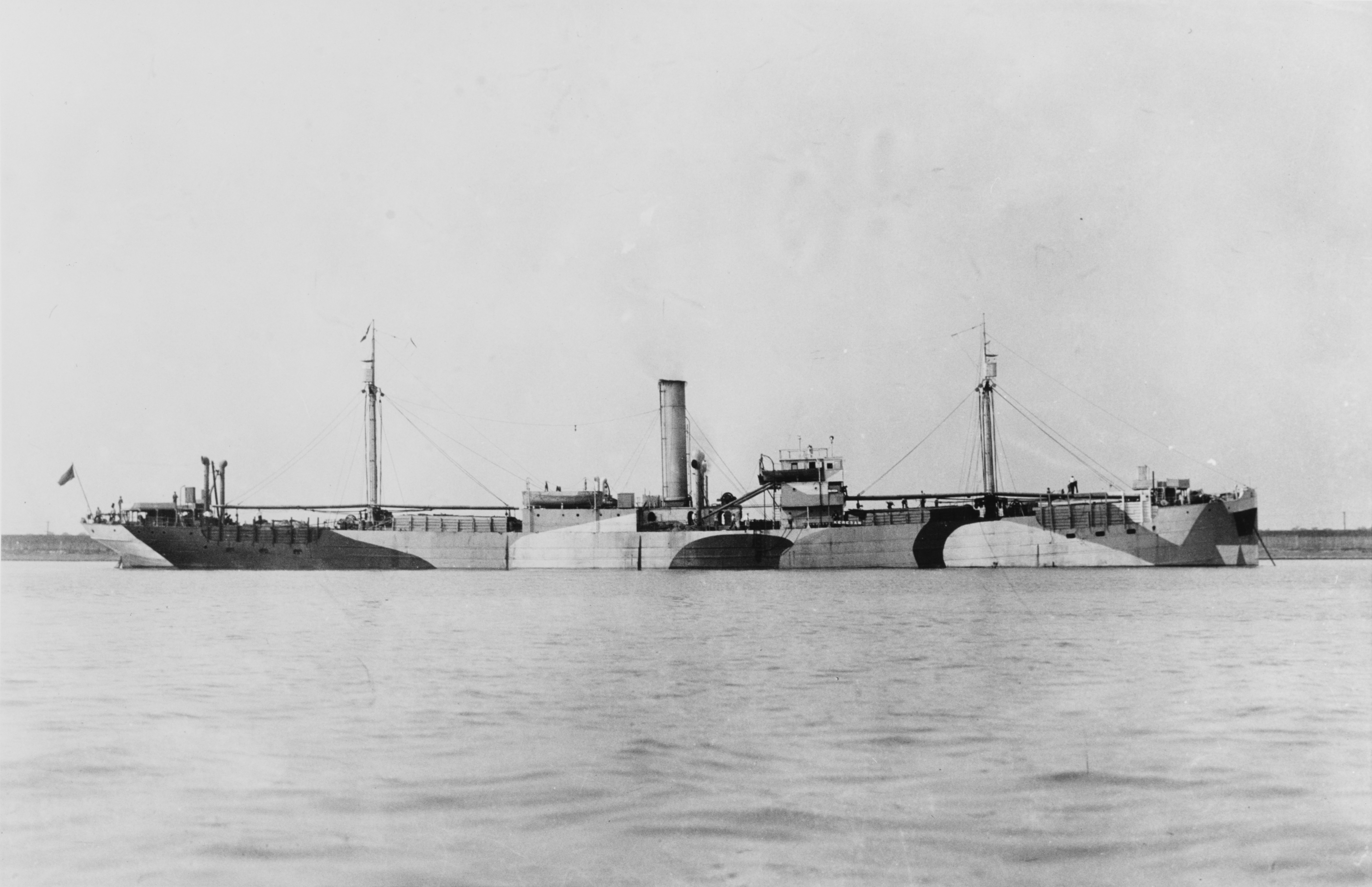
Keresan in 1918 or 1919

On 7 February 1922, it was announced that the Oceana Sea Navigation Co, Ltd, had bought seven former Austro-Hungarian merchant ships from the American Shipping and Commerce Corporation. Kermoor was one of them; along with Keresan, Keresaspa, Kerkenna, Kermanshah, Mount Sterling (formerly Kerowlee), and Mount Summit (formerly Kerlew). Oceana renamed the ships, and registered them in Budapest. Kermoor reverted to Morawitz, and her code letters were JZBH.

In 1927, TE Evans & Co, Ltd acquired Morawitz and renamed her Purley Oaks, after a neighbourhood in Croydon, in England. Her UK official number was 149786, and she was registered in London. She seems not to have been assigned code letters, but by 1930, her wireless telegraph call sign was GMZP.

In 1936, Purley Oaks was sold to Metal Industries, Limited for scrap. On 18 January that year, she arrived at Rosyth on the Firth of Forth to be broken up.

== Bibliography ==
- Bureau of Navigation (1918). Fiftieth Annual List of Merchant Vessels of the United States (PDF). Washington, DC: United States Department of Commerce and Labor – via HyperWar.
- Lloyd's Register of British and Foreign Shipping. Vol. I.–Steamers. London: Lloyd's Register of Shipping. 1908 – via Internet Archive.
- Lloyd's Register of Shipping. Vol. II.–Steamers. London: Lloyd's Register of Shipping. 1919 – via Internet Archive.
- Lloyd's Register of Shipping. Vol. II.–Steamers and Motor Vessels. London: Lloyd's Register of Shipping. 1922 – via Internet Archive.
- Lloyd's Register of Shipping. Vol. II.–Steamers and Motorships. London: Lloyd's Register of Shipping. 1927 – via Internet Archive.
- Mercantile Navy List. London: Registrar General of Shipping and Seamen. 1930 – via Crew List Index Project.
