= USS Kerkenna =

Cargo steamship that served in the US Navy

History
- Name: 1900: Borneo; 1917: Kerkenna; 1921: Mount Summit; 1922: Alföld; 1925: Doris; 1929: Ikbal
- Namesake: 1900: Borneo; 1917: Kerkennah Islands; 1921: Mount Summit, IN; 1922: Alföld
- Owner: 1900: SA Ungherse di Arm Mar Oriente; 1917: Kerr Navigation Corp; 1920: American S&C Corp; 1922: Oceana Sea Nav Co, Ltd; 1927: GF Andriadis; 1929: Barzilay & Benjamin; 1943: TC Münakalât Vekaleti Devlet Denizyollari ve Limanlari İşletme UM; 1952: Denizcilik Bankası TAO
- Operator: 1917: US Army; 1918: US Navy
- Port of registry: 1900: (Austria-Hungary) Fiume; 1917: (United States) New York; 1922: (Hungary) Budapest; 1925: (Greece) Chios; 1929: (Turkey) Istanbul
- Builder: Wm Hamilton & Co, Port Glasgow
- Yard number: 148
- Launched: 25 July 1900
- Completed: August 1900
- Commissioned: into US Navy, 28 September 1918
- Decommissioned: from US Navy, 16 April 1919
- Identification: 1900: code letters JCPN; 1917: US official number 215394; 1917: code letters LHPB; by 1928: code letters JBQW; by 1932: code letters HBGL; by 1934: call sign TCBT
- Fate: scrapped, 1963

General characteristics
- Type: cargo steamship
- Tonnage: 3,685 GRT, 2,400 NRT
- Length: 330.8 ft (100.8 m)
- Beam: 45.7 ft (13.9 m)
- Draft: 22 ft 2 in (6.76 m)
- Depth: 16.2 ft (4.9 m)
- Installed power: 1 × triple-expansion engine, 1,505 ihp, 301 NHP
- Propulsion: 1 × screw
- Speed: 8 knots (15 km/h)
- Complement: in US Navy: 65
- Armament: 1918: 2 × 3-inch/50-caliber guns

USS Kerkenna was a cargo steamship. She was built in Scotland in 1900 as Borneo for an Austro-Hungarian shipping company. In 1917 the Kerr Navigation Corporation bought her, and renamed her Kerkenna. The US Army took her over in November 1917. The US Navy requisitioned her in 1918, and commissioned her as USS Kerkenna. She was decommissioned in and returned to her owner in 1919. The American Shipping and Commerce Corporation bought her in 1920, and in 1921 renamed her Mount Summit. A Hungarian company bought her in 1922, and renamed her Alföld. A Greek shipowner bought her in 1925, and renamed her Doris. Turkish shipowners bought her in 1929, and renamed her Ikbal. She was later owned by a Turkish government ministry, and a Turkish bank. She was scrapped in Istanbul in 1963.

== Building and registration ==
William Hamilton and Company, of Port Glasgow on the River Clyde built the ship as yard number 148. She was launched on 25 July 1900 as Borneo for the Società Anonima Ungherese di Armamento Marittime Oriente ("Hungarian Eastern Maritime Shipping Company"), and completed that August. Her registered length was 330.8 ft (100.8 m), her beam was 45.7 ft (13.9 m), her depth was 16.2 ft (4.9 m), and her draft was 22 ft 2 in (6.76 m). Her tonnages were 3,685 GRT and 2,400 NRT. She had a single screw, driven by a three-cylinder triple-expansion engine that was built by David Rowan & Co of Glasgow. It was rated at 301 NHP, or 1,505 ihp, and gave her a speed of 8 knots (15 km/h). Her owners registered her at Fiume in Austria-Hungary (now Rijeka in Croatia). Her code letters were JCPN.

== Internment ==
When the First World War began in August 1914, Germany and Austria-Hungary ordered their merchant ships to return home if possible, or otherwise take shelter in a neutral port. That September, Borneo reached Tampa, Florida, and remained anchored there. She was the only ship of the Central Powers that sheltered in Tampa.

In December 1915, a Royal Navy warship arrived off Tampa, apparently in response to a report that Borneo might try to go to New Orleans. The same warship had previously appeared off Pensacola, where one Austro-Hungarian and two German ships were sheltering. (Note: US newspaper reports claim that the Royal Navy warship was "a cruiser of the same class as HMAS Sydney", but named her as "HMS Iris". This is self-contradictory, as Sydney was a Town-class cruiser, whereas the only Iris in the Royal Navy in WW1 was a Acacia-class sloop.)

By 5 February 1917, as the US's relationship with the Central Powers deteriorated, a detachment of United States Marines from USCGC Tampa was stationed on Ballast Point to watch Borneo, and report hourly to the cutter. A few days later, there was speculation that Borneo's crew might try to scuttle her, either at her anchorage, or in the harbour mouth.

== Seizure ==
On 6 April 1917, the US declared war against Germany, and seized all German ships in its ports. The US did not declare war against Austria-Hungary, so the 14 Austro-Hungarian ships in US ports were not seized. However, two days later, Austria-Hungary terminated diplomatic relations with the US, so the US responded by seizing all of those Austro-Hungarian ships.

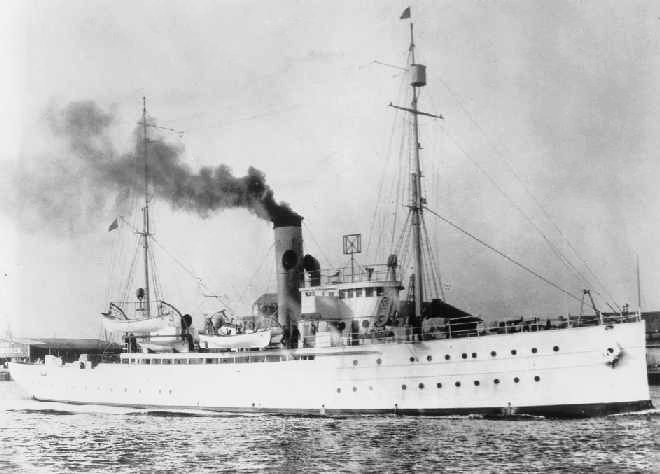
USCGC Tallapoosa, which seized Borneo

On 9 April, USCGC Tallapoosa left Tampa to steam the six miles to where Borneo was anchored. By April 1917, only a skeleton crew of nine men remained aboard Borneo: her Master, Captain Thian; with five other officers, and three ratings. Tallapoosa put guards aboard Borneo, and interned Captain Thian and his men. They were taken first to Jacksonville, where the officers and ratings of a German ship, Frieda Leonhardt, were also being held. Both crews were taken thence to New Orleans.

== Kerr Navigation Corporation ==
By 15 August 1917, the Kerr Navigation Corporation had bought Borneo and seven other Austro-Hungarian cargo ships; with a combined tonnage of almost 57,000 GRT; for a total of $12 million; and had put them into the transatlantic trade. Kerr renamed its acquisitions, and registered them in New York. Borneo was renamed Kerkenna, after the Kerkennah Islands off the coast of Tunisia in the Mediterranean. Her US official number was 215394, and her code letters were LHPB. On 22 November 1917, the US Army took over Kerkenna from her owner. She was defensively armed with two 3-inch/50-caliber guns.

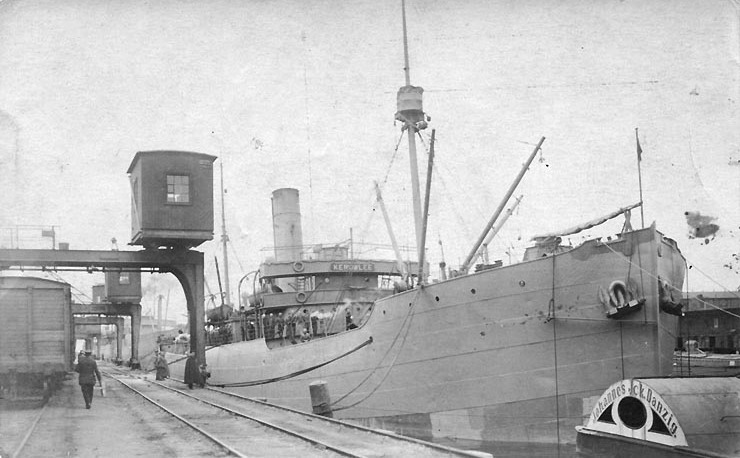
Kerowlee, formerly Campania; another of the Austro-Hungarian cargo ships that Kerr bought in 1917

On 28 September 1918, Kerkenna was at Brest, France when the US Navy requisitioned her, and commissioned her as USS Kerkenna, with Lieutenant Commander AF Dahlstedt, USNRF, as her commanding officer. Unusually, she was not given a Naval Registry Identification Number. She was assigned to the Naval Overseas Transportation Service (NOTS), and carried coal and Army supplies between Britain and France. On 24 February 1919, she left Inverness, Scotland, with a cargo of mines and mine supplies for return to the US. She called at New York on 19 March, and continued to Norfolk, Virginia, where she arrived on 24 March. On 16 April, she was decommissioned from the Navy, and simultaneously transferred to the United States Shipping Board (USSB) for immediate return to her owner.

== Kerr's trade with Europe ==
In June and July 1919, Kerkenna steamed from Norfolk, Virginia to Copenhagen. Later that year, she called at Danzig in Germany (now Gdańsk in Poland), Hamburg, Dartmouth in England, New York, Philadelphia, and Baltimore, where she arrived on 4 December. She was due to leave Philadelphia for Hamburg on 6 December, and passenger berths were advertised on that voyage. In fact, she left Philadelphia on 14 December, and reached Hamburg on 11 January 1920.

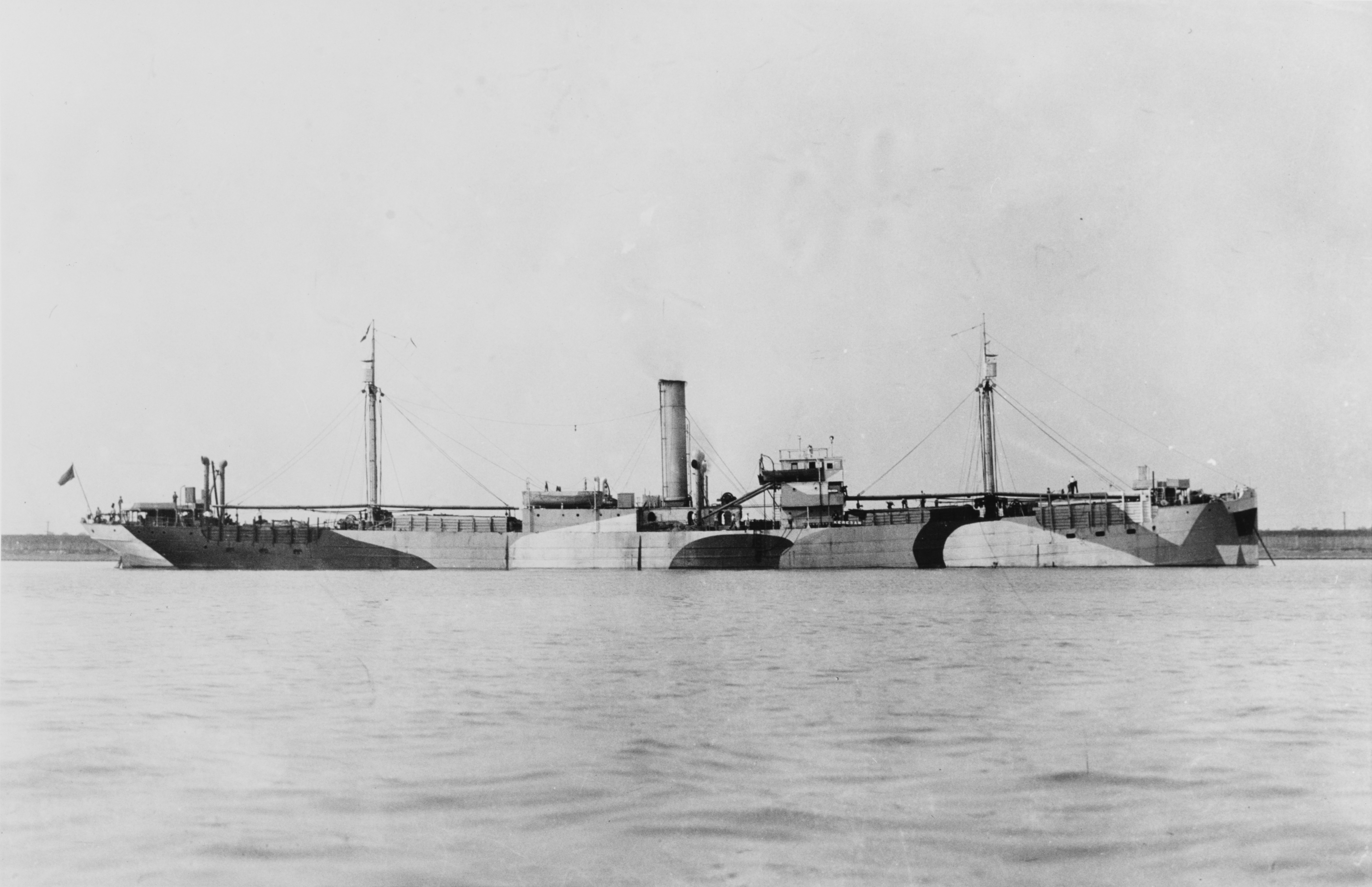
Keresan in 1918 or 1919

In Germany and Austria, the population was recovering from hardships caused by the Entente blockade of the Central Powers. In November 1919, three Kerr ships – Keresan and Kerowlee, and Kerwood – all left the US for Hamburg, carrying aid organised by the Central Committee for the Relief of Distress in Germany and Austria. In February 1920, the American Merchants Shipping & Forwarding Co advertised a service for people to send "Self-packed food and clothing boxes" to Germany via various steamships, including Kerkenna at the end of that month, and Kermoor early in March.

In February 1920, Kerkenna arrived in New York from Dartmouth. On 12 March, she left New York for Bordeaux, but she developed engine trouble, and had to return. After repairs, she was due to leave New York to resume her voyage on 23 March. She reached Bordeaux by 17 April, and continued to Hamburg, where she arrived on 5 May.

In September 1920, Kerr advertised passenger berths aboard Kerkenna from Philadelphia to Rotterdam and Hamburg. She was scheduled to leave Philadelphia on 10 October, but by 1 October, her departure date had been revised to 20 October, and by 8 October, it had been revised again, to 18 October.

== United American Lines ==
In October 1920, United American Lines (UAL) acquired ten Kerr ships, including Kerkenna. The ships continued a weekly cargo service between Hamburg and New York, and also a service between Hamburg and the Río de la Plata, via ports in Brazil. Under hew new owner, Kerkenna left Baltimore on 10 November for Hamburg via Bremen. She reached Hamburg on 9 December, where on 12 December the Associated Press noted US merchant ships outnumbered those of the Merchant Navy of the UK, which at that time was the biggest in the World. An AP reporter counted ten US ships in Hamburg, most of which were discharging grain. This compared with only six UK ships, four French, four Dutch, and one Japanese. However, this was only a small fraction of what had been normal trade in Hamburg until 1914. In the Hamburg America Line (HAPAG) docks there were only two ships: one each from the US and UK. Up until 1914, there was typically a total of about 25. The Entente Powers had confiscated nearly all German ocean-going merchant ships as part of World War I reparations. UAL ships were carrying cargoes for HAPAG, which was Germany's biggest shipping company, until HAPAG could replace the ships it had surrendered to the Entente.

While Kerkenna was steaming from Baltimore to Hamburg, UAL announced that her next trip would be from Hamburg to New Orleans. UAL believed she would be the first general cargo ship to work that route since the war, and hoped that this might be the beginning of a regular service. In January 1921, Kerkenna steamed from Hamburg via Boston to New Orleans, where she arrived on 31 January.

By 8 February 1921, Kerkenna had been renamed Mount Summit, presumably after Mount Summit, Indiana. On 31 March, 13 ships in New Orleans, including Mount Summit, dragged their anchors in a squall, and were all slightly damaged.

== Repatriation ==
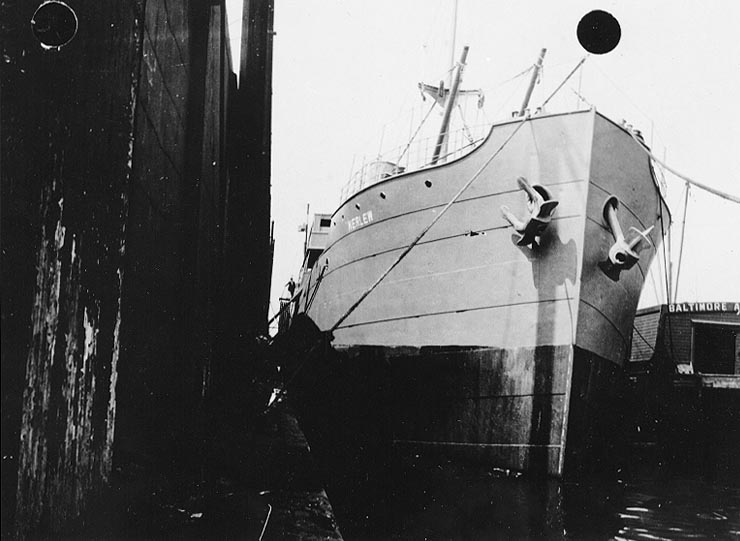
Kerlew, which UAL renamed Mount Sidney

In October 1921, Mount Summit and another UAL ship, Mount Sidney (formerly Kerlew), were described as "especially adapted to the Levant and Black Sea trades, but useless to the United American Lines". The USSB had granted permission for both ships to be transferred to the Hungarian registry, as UAL was negotiating to sell the ships to a Hungarian company. On 1 November, it was reported that the USSB had granted permission for the transfer "six weeks ago"; and that the Austrian Creditanstalt bank, HAPAG, and UAL were jointly creating a corporation called the Oesterreichsiche Reederei AG, ("Austrian Shipping Company, Ltd").

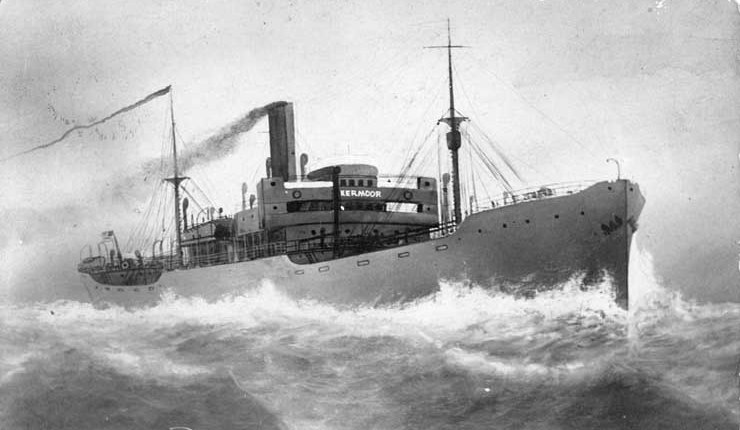
Kermoor, one of seven UAL ships that Oceana bought in 1922

Three months later, on 7 February 1922, it was announced that the Oceana Sea Navigation Co, Ltd had bought from UAL not only Mount Summit and Mount Sidney, but also Keresan, Keresaspa, Kermanshah, Kermoor, and Mount Sterling (formerly Kerowlee). Oceana renamed the ships, and registered them in Budapest. Kerkenna was renamed Alföld, the Hungarian name for the Great Hungarian Plain.

== Later career ==
By 1927, a Greek shipowner, George F Andriadis, had bought Alföld, renamed her Doris, and registered her in Chios. By 1928, her code letters were JBQW.

In 1929, Turkish shipowners, Barzilay & Benjamin, bought Doris, renamed her Ikbal, and registered her in Istanbul. By 1932, her code letters were HBGL. By 1934, her call sign was TCBT, and this had superseded her code letters.

By 1943, Ikbal was owned by TC Münakalât Vekaleti Devlet Denizyollari ve Limanlari İşletme UM, which was Turkey's ministry for the management of seaways and ports. By 1952, she was owned by Denizcilik Bankası TAO, or "Maritime Bank". By 1959, Ikbal was on record as still having her original David Rowan & Co steam engine. However, in that year, Lloyd's Register withdrew her insurance classification, at her owner's request.

In 1963, Ikbal was broken up at Kalafat Yeri, on the Bosphorus in Istanbul. Work to break her up began on 7 February, more than 62 years after she was launched, and 34 years after she was transferred to the Turkish registry.

== Bibliography ==
- Bureau of Navigation (1918). Fiftieth Annual List of Merchant Vessels of the United States (PDF). Washington, DC: United States Department of Commerce and Labor – via HyperWar.
- Bureau of Navigation (1921). Fifty-Third Annual List of Merchant Vessels of the United States (PDF). Washington, DC: United States Department of Commerce and Labor – via HyperWar.
- Lloyd's Register of British and Foreign Shipping. Vol. I.–Steamers. London: Lloyd's Register of Shipping. 1901 – via Internet Archive.
- Lloyd's Register of Shipping. Vol. II.–Steamers. London: Lloyd's Register of Shipping. 1919 – via Internet Archive.
- Lloyd's Register of Shipping. Vol. II.–Steamers. London: Lloyd's Register of Shipping. 1921 – via Internet Archive.
- Lloyd's Register of Shipping. Vol. II.–Steamers and Motor Vessels. London: Lloyd's Register of Shipping. 1922 – via Internet Archive.
- Lloyd's Register of Shipping. Vol. II.–Steamers and Motorships. London: Lloyd's Register of Shipping. 1926 – via Internet Archive.
- Lloyd's Register of Shipping. Vol. II.–Steamers and Motorships. London: Lloyd's Register of Shipping. 1927 – via Internet Archive.
- Lloyd's Register of Shipping. Vol. II.–Steamers and Motorships. London: Lloyd's Register of Shipping. 1928 – via Internet Archive.
- Lloyd's Register of Shipping (PDF). Vol. II.–Steamers and Motorships of 300 Tons Gross and Over. London: Lloyd's Register of Shipping. 1930 – via Southampton City Council.
- Lloyd's Register of Shipping (PDF). Vol. II.–Steamers and Motorships of 300 Tons Gross and Over. London: Lloyd's Register of Shipping. 1932 – via Southampton City Council.
- Lloyd's Register of Shipping (PDF). Vol. II.–Steamers and Motorships of 300 Tons Gross and Over. London: Lloyd's Register of Shipping. 1934 – via Southampton City Council.
- Lloyd's Register of Shipping (PDF). Vol. II.–Steamers and Motorships of 300 Tons Gross. Trawlers, Tugs, Dredgers, etc. London: Lloyd's Register of Shipping. 1943 – via Southampton City Council.
- Register Book. Vol. I: A–L. London: Lloyd's Register of Shipping. 1952 – via Internet Archive.
- Register Book. Vol. I: Register of Ships. London: Lloyd's Register of Shipping. 1959 – via Internet Archive.
