= USS Keresan =

Cargo steamship that served in the US Navy

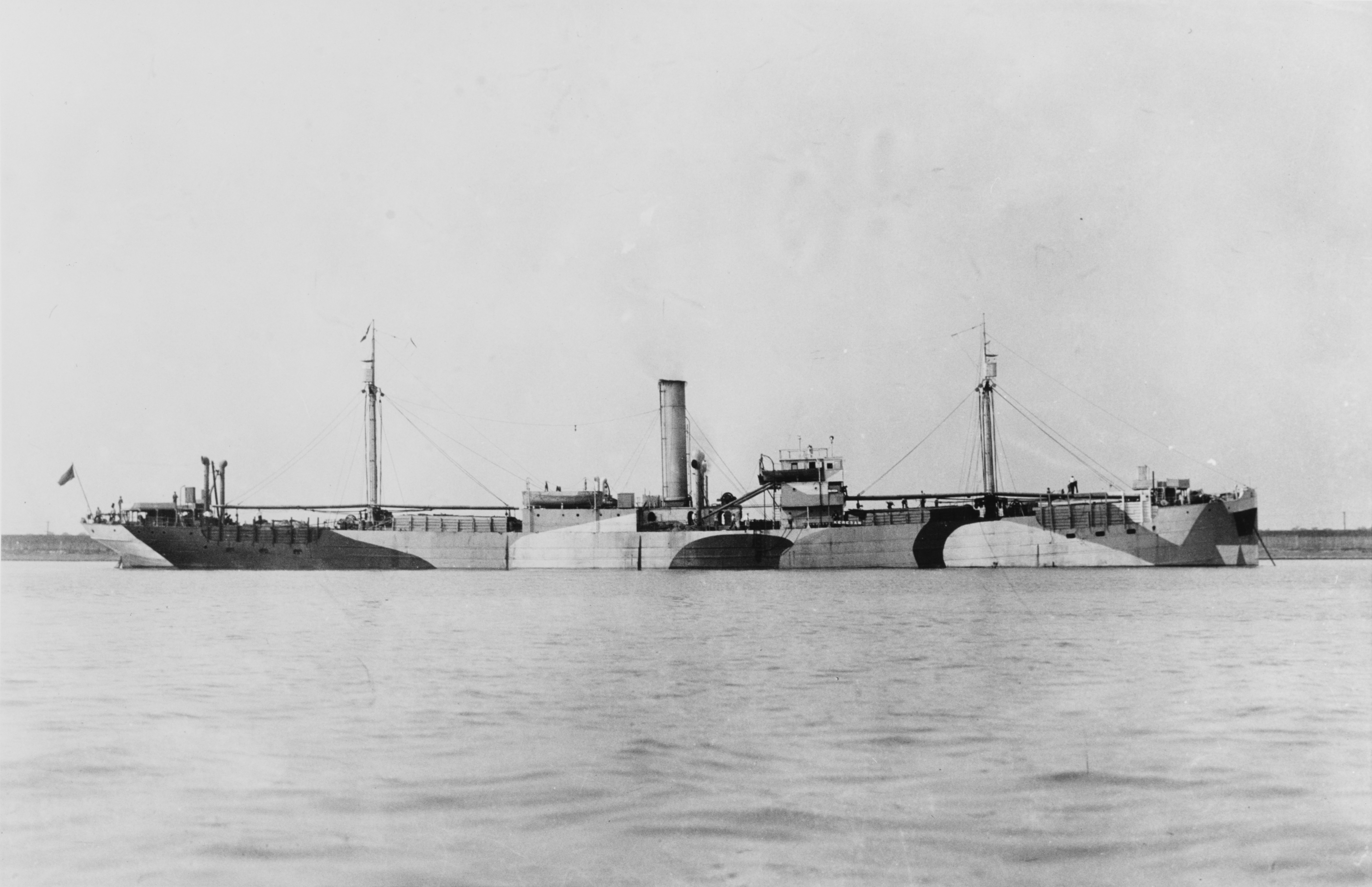
- USS Keresan in late 1918 or early 1919

History
- Name: 1911: Electra; 1912: Erodiade; 1917: Keresan; 1921: Mount Seward; 1922: Debreczen; 1927: Fenwell; 1928: Chislehurst; 1933: Yolande B.; 1934: Yolande
- Namesake: 1911: Electra; 1912: Herodias; 1917: Keresan; 1921: Seward Mountain; 1922: Debrecen; 1928: Chislehurst
- Owner: 1912: MU Martinolić & Co; 1917: Kerr Navigation Corp; 1921: American S&C Corp; 1922: Oceana Sea Nav Co, Ltd; 1927: Fen SS Co, Ltd; 1928: Britain SS Co, Ltd; 1933: LB Moller; 1934: OE Bertin
- Operator: 1918: US Navy; 1921: United American Lines; 1922: Atlantica Trust Co; 1927: P Samuel; 1928: Watts, Watts & Co, Ltd; 1933: Moller & Co
- Port of registry: 1912: (Austria-Hungary) Lussinpiccolo; 1917: (United States) New York; 1922: (Hungary) Budapest; 1927: (United Kingdom) London; 1933: (United Kingdom) Shanghai; 1933: (France) Shanghai
- Builder: Wm Pickersgill & Sons, Sunderland
- Yard number: 173
- Launched: 18 December 1911
- Completed: February 1912
- Commissioned: into US Navy, 18 September 1918
- Decommissioned: from US Navy, 26 June 1919
- Identification: 1912: code letters HGMQ; 1917: US official number 215395; 1917: code letters LHPC; 1918: Naval Registry ID-1806; 1922: code letters JZBF; 1927: UK official number 149905; 1927: code letters KWMP; 1930: call sign GNFX; 1934: call sign FPDI
- Fate: wrecked, 5 March 1938

General characteristics
- Type: cargo steamship
- Tonnage: 4,507 GRT, 2,891 NRT
- Displacement: 8,700 tons
- Length: 348.5 ft (106.2 m) registered
- Beam: 50.1 ft (15.3 m)
- Draft: 22 ft 8 1/2 in (6.92 m)
- Depth: 23.5 ft (7.2 m)
- Decks: 1
- Installed power: 1 × triple-expansion engine, 1,600 ihp, 323 NHP
- Propulsion: 1 × screw
- Speed: 11 knots (20 km/h)
- Complement: in US Navy: 62
- Armament: 1918: 1 × 6-inch/50-caliber gun; 1 × 3-inch/50-caliber gun

USS Keresan (ID-1806) was a cargo steamship. She was launched in England in 1911 as Electra, and completed in 1912 as Erodiade for an Austro-Hungarian ship-owner. When the First World War began in 1914, she took refuge in Argentina. In 1917 the Kerr Navigation Corporation bought her, and renamed her Keresan. The United States Navy requisitioned her in 1918, and commissioned her as USS Keresan. She was decommissioned in and returned to her owner in 1919.

The American Shipping and Commerce Corporation bought her in 1920, and in 1921 renamed her Mount Seward. A Hungarian company bought her in 1922, and renamed her Debreczen. A UK company bought her in 1927, and renamed her Fenwell. Another UK company bought her in 1928, and renamed her Chislehurst. LB Moller of Shanghai bought her in 1933, and renamed her Yolande B. Moller changed her ownership in 1934, and her name was shortened to Yolande. In 1938, she was wrecked on an island off the coast of Shandong in China.

== Electra to Erodiade ==
William Pickersgill & Sons, of Southwick, Sunderland, in North East England, built the ship as yard number 173. She was launched on 18 December 1911 as Electra, for Lucović & Co of Lussinpiccolo in Austria-Hungary (now Mali Lošinj in Croatia). However, she was completed for MU Martinolić & Co, also of Lussinpiccolo, as Erodiade.

Erodiade's registered length was 348.5 ft (106.2 m), her beam was 50.1 ft (15.3 m), her depth was 23.5 ft (7.2 m), and her draft was 22 ft 8 1/2 in (6.92 m). Her tonnages were 4,507 GRT, 2,891 NRT, and 8,700 tons displacement. She had a single screw, driven by a three-cylinder triple-expansion engine made by George Clark, Ltd, of Sunderland. It was rated at 323 NHP or 1,600 ihp, and gave her a speed of 11 knots (20 km/h). Martinolić registered her at Lussinpiccolo. Her code letters were HGMQ.

== Refuge in Argentina ==
When the First World War began in August 1914, Germany and Austria-Hungary ordered their merchant ships to return home if possible, or otherwise take shelter in a neutral port. Erodiade sheltered in Buenos Aires, in neutral Argentina. On 6 April 1917, the US declared war against Germany, but not against Austria-Hungary. However, the Federal Government seized ships of both countries in its ports, including 14 Austro-Hungarian ones.

== Kerr Navigation Corporation ==
By 15 August 1917, the Kerr Navigation Corporation had bought eight Austro-Hungarian cargo ships; with a combined tonnage of almost 57,000 GRT; for a total of $12 million; and was using them in transatlantic trade. Most were ships that the Federal Government had seized in US ports, but they also included Erodiade. Kerr renamed its acquisitions, and registered them in New York. Erodiade was renamed Keresan, after the Keres family of Pueblo peoples. Her US official number was 215395, and her code letters were LHPC.

By the beginning of November 1917, Keresan was in New York. Members of her crew complained to the US Shipping Commissioner about the ship's chief officer. The investigation found that one member of her crew was a 20-year-old German, who had joined the ship in Buenos Aires by posing as a Russian. A US Marshal arrested him, as the Brooklyn waterfront was an area from which German citizens were prohibited. The German was interned, and sent to Ellis Island.

== USS Keresan ==
In 1918, the US Navy requisitioned Keresan. She was defensively armed with one 6-inch/50-caliber gun and one 3-inch/50-caliber gun, painted in camouflage, and given the Naval Registry Identification Number 1806. On 18 September she was commissioned as USS Keresan, with Lieutenant Commander R Douglas was her commanding officer.

USS Keresan was assigned to the Naval Overseas Transportation Service, and on 1 October she left New York carrying a cargo of ammunition to the American Expeditionary Forces in Europe. After the Armistice of 11 November 1918, she returned to New York in 13 December. In 1919, she took a general cargo to Buenos Aires. In May she returned via Barbados, and on 5 June she reached New York. On 26 June she was decommissioned from the Navy, and returned to her owner.

== Kerr's trade with Germany ==
On 5 August 1919, Keresan left Hamburg with a cargo of glassware. She was the first US ship to leave Hamburg since the beginning of the First World War, and she reached New York on 23 August. That September and October, she made another return trip from New York to Hamburg and back.

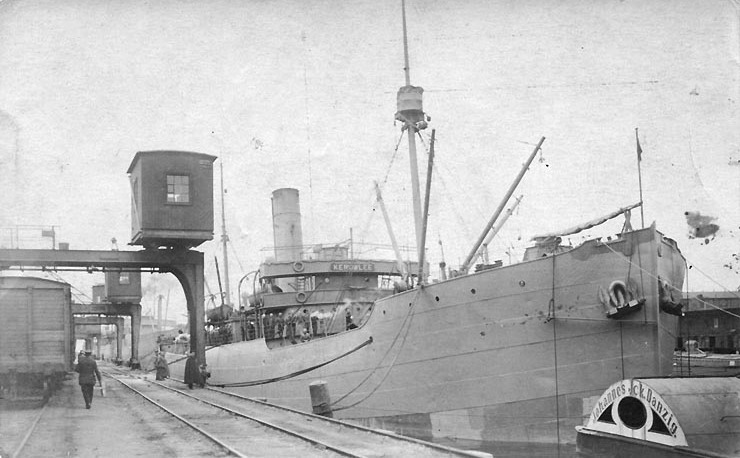
Kerr's Kerowlee in 1919

Keresan was one of four ships that left the US in November 1919, taking emergency aid to Hamburg, organised by the Central Committee for the Relief of Distress in Germany and Austria. The other ships were Kerr's Kerowlee and Kerwood, and the Spanish Mar Rojo. On her return voyage from Hamburg to New York, she spent Christmas 1919 and New Year 1920 at sea. Keresan's return voyage was much delayed, and included a call at Halifax, Nova Scotia; possibly for bunkering.

On about 4 February 1920, Keresan left New York on another voyage to Hamburg. Her cargo included aid for Czechoslovakia, which were transhipped in Hamburg, and continued up the Elbe by barge. By 4 March, the aid cargo had reached the border city of Děčín, on its way to Prague. Keresan was one of at least five Kerr ships that continued to trade between the US and Hamburg in 1920, in partnership with Hamburg America Line. In April, she sailed from Hamburg, via Bermuda, to Norfolk, Virginia. In May, she sailed from Philadelphia to Hamburg. On 4 October, she arrived in Hamburg at the end of a voyage from Buenos Aires via Amsterdam.

== United American Lines ==
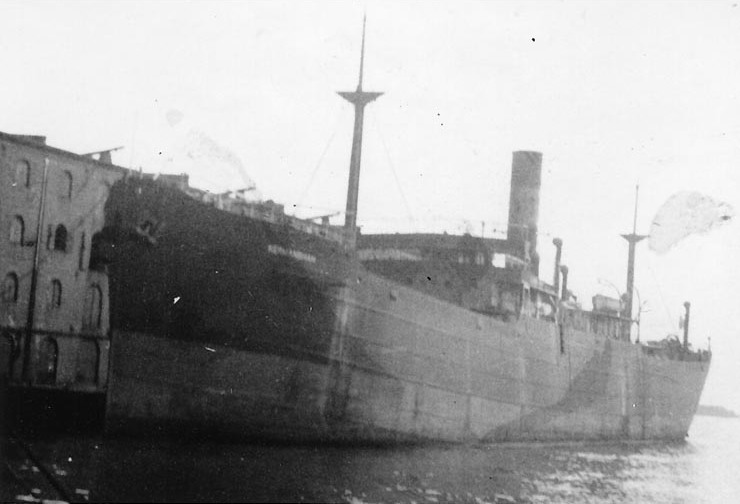
Kermanshah, another of the ships that United American Lines acquired from Kerr

In October 1920, United American Lines acquired ten Kerr ships, including Keresan. The ships continued a weekly cargo service between Hamburg and New York, and also a service between Hamburg and the Río de la Plata, via ports in Brazil. Keresan went to Rosario and Buenos Aires in Argentina, and left Buenos Aires on 20 December. She called at Santos in Brazil, where on 7 January 1921 a US member of her crew was murdered. She left Santos on 17 January, called at Santa Cruz de Tenerife, and reached Hamburg on 21 February.

Keresan was due to leave Hamburg for Boston, Massachusetts. However, on 10 March 1921, as she was leaving port, she grounded in the Elbe. She was refloated, leaking, and was to be dry docked for repair. On 21 or 22 March her repairs were completed, and she left Hamburg. She called via Boston and Philadelphia to Baltimore.

Toward the end of April 1921, Keresan was renamed Mount Seward, after Seward Mountain in the Adirondack Mountains. Her next voyage was in May, from Baltimore to Hamburg; where she loaded a mixed cargo of German-made toys, plus "paperware, hollow-ware, hardware, earthenware, woodenware, aluminumware, baskets, paintings and artificial flowers". She returned via Boston, and reached Baltimore on 18 June.

Mount Seward continued to trade between Baltimore and Hamburg, calling at Boston on her westward voyages. In September and October 1921, she made an eastward voyage from Baltimore to Hamburg via Norfolk, Virginia, and Bremen. On 28 December 1921, she left Bremen for Kiel.

== Later career ==
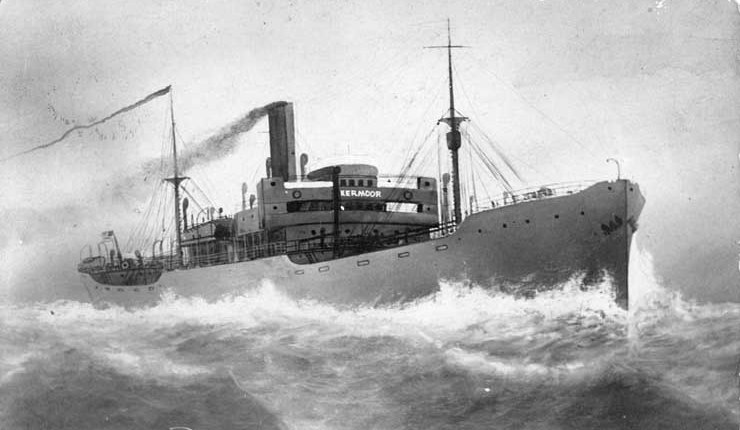
Kermoor, one of the seven former Austro-Hungarian ships that the Oceana Sea Navigation Co, Ltd bought from United American Lines in 1922

On 7 February 1922, it was announced that the Oceana Sea Navigation Co, Ltd, had bought seven former Austro-Hungarian merchant ships from the American Shipping and Commerce Corporation. Keresan was one of them; along with Keresaspa, Kerkenna, Kermoor, Kermanshah, Mount Sterling (formerly Kerowlee), and Mount Summit (formerly Kerlew). Oceana renamed the ships, and registered them in Budapest. Mount Seward became Debreczen, after the city of Debrecen in Hungary. Her code letters were JZBF.

In 1927, Percival Samuel, of the Fen Steamship Co, bought Debreczen, renamed her Fenwell, and registered her in London. Her UK official number was 149905, and her code letters were KWMP. In 1928, the Britain Steam Ship Co, whose managers were Watts, Watts & Co, bought Fenwell, and renamed her Chislehurst, after Chislehurst in what was then part of Kent (now part of south London). By 1930, her call sign was GNFX.

In 1933, LB Moller, a company controlled by Moller & Company, bought Chislehurst, renamed her Yolande B., and put her under the UK registry in the Shanghai International Settlement. In 1934, Moller transferred her ownership to OE Bertin, and her registration to the Shanghai French Concession. By 1935, her call sign was FPDI.

In March 1938, Yolande was taking a cargo of coal from Chinwangtao (now Qinhuangdao) to Shanghai. On 5 March, she was wrecked on an island near Weihaiwei, in the Shantung (now Shandong) province of China. Records call the location "Alceste Island", but no such island exists. It may be a British name for an island in either the Bohai Sea or the Yellow Sea, associated with the voyage of the sailing frigate HMS Alceste to China in 1816.

== Bibliography ==
- Bureau of Navigation (1918). Fiftieth Annual List of Merchant Vessels of the United States (PDF). Washington, DC: United States Department of Commerce and Labor – via HyperWar.
- Bureau of Navigation (1921). Fifty-Third Annual List of Merchant Vessels of the United States (PDF). Washington, DC: United States Department of Commerce and Labor – via HyperWar.
- Lloyd's Register of British and Foreign Shipping. Vol. II.–Steamers. London: Lloyd's Register of Shipping. 1912 – via Internet Archive.
- Lloyd's Register of Shipping. Vol. II.–Steamers. London: Lloyd's Register of Shipping. 1919 – via Internet Archive.
- Lloyd's Register of Shipping. Vol. II.–Steamers. London: Lloyd's Register of Shipping. 1921 – via Internet Archive.
- Lloyd's Register of Shipping. Vol. II.–Steamers and Motor Vessels. London: Lloyd's Register of Shipping. 1922 – via Internet Archive.
- Lloyd's Register of Shipping. Vol. II.–Steamers and Motorships. London: Lloyd's Register of Shipping. 1928 – via Internet Archive.
- Lloyd's Register of Shipping (PDF). Vol. II.–Steamers and Motorships of 300 Tons Gross and Over. London: Lloyd's Register of Shipping. 1930 – via Southampton City Council.
- Lloyd's Register of Shipping (PDF). Vol. II.–Steamers and Motorships of 300 Tons Gross and Over. London: Lloyd's Register of Shipping. 1933 – via Southampton City Council.
- Lloyd's Register of Shipping (PDF). Vol. II.–Steamers and Motorships of 300 Tons Gross and Over. London: Lloyd's Register of Shipping. 1934 – via Southampton City Council.
- Lloyd's Register of Shipping (PDF). Vol. II.–Steamers and Motorships Over 300 Tons. London: Lloyd's Register of Shipping. 1935 – via Southampton City Council.
- Mercantile Navy List. London: Registrar General of Shipping and Seamen. 1928 – via Crew List Index Project.
- Mercantile Navy List. London: Registrar General of Shipping and Seamen. 1929 – via Crew List Index Project.
- Mercantile Navy List. London: Registrar General of Shipping and Seamen. 1930 – via Crew List Index Project.
