= USS Kerlew =

Cargo steamship that served in the US Navy

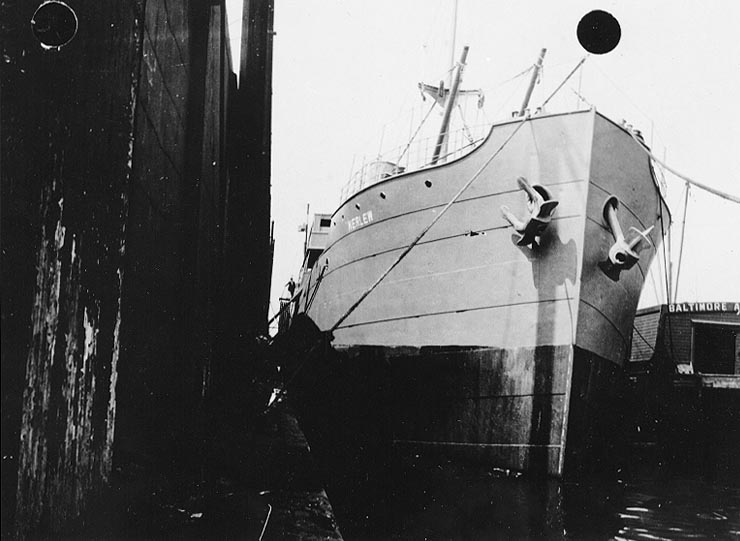
- USS Kerlew in 1918 or 1919, possibly in Baltimore, MD

History
- Name: 1906: Virginia; 1917: Kerlew; 1921: Mount Sidney; 1922: Háros; 1928: Paolina Giuffrida
- Namesake: 1921: Mount Sidney, VA; 1922: Háros Island
- Owner: 1906: Unione Austriaca di Nav; 1917: Kerr Navigation Corp; 1920: American S&C Corp; 1922: Oceana Sea Nav Co, Ltd; 1928: A Giuffrida fu Carmelo
- Operator: 1917: US Army; 1918: US Navy; 1919: Kerr Steamship Company
- Port of registry: 1906: (Austria-Hungary) Trieste; 1917: (United States) New York; 1922: (Hungary) Budapest; 1928: (Kingdom of Italy) Catania
- Builder: Craig, Taylor & Co, Ltd, Stockton
- Yard number: 113
- Launched: 26 December 1905
- Completed: 1 February 1906
- Commissioned: into US Navy, 13 November 1918
- Decommissioned: from US Navy, 12 April 1919
- Identification: 1906: code letters HTML; 1917: US official number 215396; 1917: code letters LHPD; 1918: Naval Registry ID-1325; 1922: code letters JSBG; by 1930: code letters PBWR
- Fate: scrapped, 1933

General characteristics
- Type: cargo steamship
- Tonnage: 3,563 GRT, 2,314 NRT
- Length: 326.0 ft (99.4 m)
- Beam: 42.0 ft (12.8 m)
- Draft: 25 ft 0 in (7.62 m)
- Depth: 17.6 ft (5.4 m)
- Decks: 1
- Installed power: 1 × triple-expansion engine, 1,505 ihp, 355 NHP
- Propulsion: 1 × screw
- Speed: 10 knots (19 km/h)
- Complement: in US Navy: 77
- Armament: in US Navy: 1 × 4 in (100 mm) naval gun
- Notes: sister ship: Irene

USS Kerlew (ID-1325) was a cargo steamship. She was launched in England in 1905 as Virginia for an Austro-Hungarian shipping company. In 1917 the Kerr Navigation Corporation bought her, and renamed her Kerlew. The US Army took her over in October 1917. The US Navy requisitioned her in 1918, and commissioned her as USS Kerlew. She was decommissioned in and returned to her owner in 1919. United American Lines (UAL) acquired her in 1920, which led to intervention by the US Internal Revenue Service in pursuit of excess profits tax, and a dispute in the New York Supreme Court between UAL and the Kerr Steamship Company. In 1921, UAL renamed her Mount Sidney. A Hungarian company bought her in 1922, and renamed her Háros. By 1928, an Italian shipowner had bought her, and renamed her Paolina Giuffrida. She was scrapped in Italy in 1932 or 1933.

== Irene and Virginia ==
In 1905, Craig, Taylor & Co, Ltd, of Stockton-on-Tees in North East England built a pair of sister ships for the Unione Austriaca di Navigazione (UAN), which is now Cosulich Line. Yard number 112 was launched on 13 November 1905 as Irene, and completed on 1 December. Yard number 113 was launched on 26 December 1905 as Virginia, and completed on 1 February 1906.

Virginia's registered length was 326.0 ft (99.4 m), her beam was 42.0 ft (12.8 m), her depth was 17.6 ft (5.4 m), and her draft was 25 ft 0 in (7.62 m). Her tonnages were 3,563 GRT and 2,314 NRT. She had a single screw, driven by a three-cylinder triple-expansion engine that was built by the North East Marine Engineering Company of Sunderland. It was rated at 1,505 ihp, or 355 NHP, and gave her a speed of 10 knots (19 km/h). UAN registered her in Trieste. Her code letters were HTML.

== Refuge ==
When the First World War began in August 1914, Germany and Austria-Hungary ordered their merchant ships to return home if possible, or otherwise take shelter in a neutral port. Virginia seems to have taken refuge in a neutral port somewhere in the Western Hemisphere. She does not appear in a list of merchant ships of the central powers interned in the United States by May 1915, or in a later list published in January 1917. She may have taken refuge in another neutral country in the Americas, as the Austro-Hungarian Erodiade did in Argentina.

== Kerlew ==
By 15 August 1917, the Kerr Navigation Corporation had bought eight Austro-Hungarian cargo ships; with a combined tonnage of almost 57,000 GRT; for a total of $12 million; and was using them in transatlantic trade. Most were ships that the Federal Government had seized in US ports, but they also included Erodiade and Virginia. Kerr renamed its acquisitions, and registered them in New York. Virginia was renamed Kerlew. Her US official number was 215396, and her code letters were LHPD.

On 17 October 1917, Kerlew was in New York, where the US Army bareboat chartered her. On 13 October 1918, she was in Cardiff, Wales, when the US Navy requisitioned her. She was commissioned as USS Kerlew, with the Naval Registry Identification Number 1325, and Lieutenant SV Kalhauge, USNRF, as her commanding officer. Kerlew was defensively armed with one 4 in (100 mm) naval gun. She continued to serve the US Army, by carrying coal between ports in Britain and France. On 29 January 1919, she arrived in Invergordon, Scotland, to load a cargo of mines to return to the United States. She left Invergordon on 19 February, and reached Norfolk, Virginia on 9 March. She was transferred to the United States Shipping Board, decommissioned on 12 April, and returned to her owner that same day.

Once back in merchant service, Kerlew's ports of call from May to October 1919 included Baltimore, New York, Barry, Hamburg, and Rotterdam. On 29 October, it was reported that Kerlew's Chief Officer and mess boy had been arrested in Brooklyn for smuggling whiskey into the US. This was after the Eighteenth Amendment to the United States Constitution, but before nationwide prohibition in the United States.

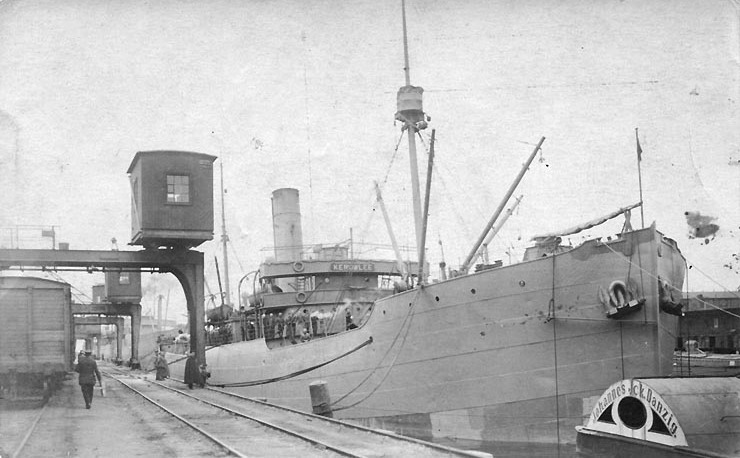
Kerr's Kerowlee in 1919

By 27 October 1919, the Kerr Steamship Co was advertising passenger berths aboard Kerlew from Philadelphia to Hamburg, due to leave Philadelphia on 6 November. Her departure date was deferred four times, and she seems to have eventually left Philadelphia on 21 November, 15 days later than originally advertised. She reached Hamburg on 8 December. Her cargo to Hamburg included aid for Germany and Austria, where the population was recovering from hardships caused by the Entente blockade of the Central Powers: 3,342 parcels sent by individuals; valued at $75,000, and 1,172 parcels for the German Red Cross, valued at $25,000. The cost for shipping the parcels was $14,000 In January 1920, the American Merchants Shipping & Forwarding Co advertised a service for people to send "Self-packed food and clothing boxes" to Germany via various steamships; including three Kerr ships: Kerlew on 17 January, Keresan on 24 January, and Kerowlee on 31 January.

In the first nine months of 1920, Kerlew's ports of call included Baltimore, Philadelphia, Hamburg, New York, Dartmouth, New York, Norfolk, VA, and Newport News. On 20 May, she docked at Pier 6, Brooklyn. In July 1920, one of her cargoes from the US to Germany included 25 boxes of canned milk for schoolchildren in the Elberfeld district of the city of Wuppertal. On 7 September, she docked at the foot of 57th Street, Manhattan.

== Contest for control ==
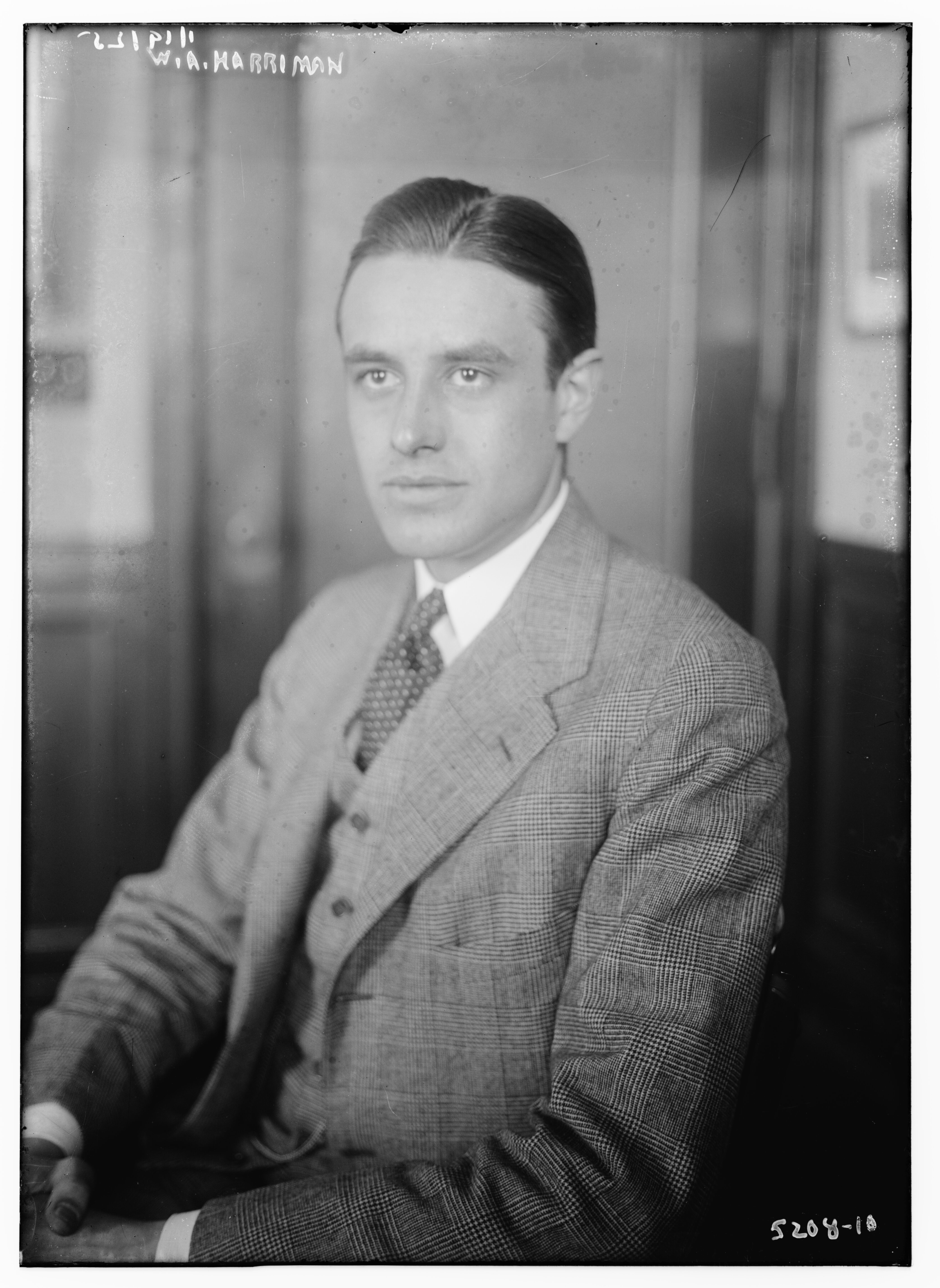
W. Averell Harriman in about 1920

By July 1920, the American Shipping and Commerce Corporation owned the Kerr Navigation Corporation. The Kerr Steamship Co, Inc was a separate entity, which managed the Kerr fleet. The contract guaranteed that the Kerr Steamship Co received a commission of five percent of the gross income of the ships. Harriman's representative considered this clause to be one-sided. On 24 July, the American Ship and Commerce Company notified the Kerr Steamship Co that it would terminate the management agreement. On 5 August, W. Averell Harriman, President of the American Shipping and Commerce Corporation, publicly announced that the Kerr Navigation Corporation would be renamed the American Ship and Navigation Corporation, and that the management agreement with the Kerr Steamship Co would be terminated. Another shipping company in Harriman's group would be renamed the United American Lines, and the former Kerr ships would also be operated under the UAL name. Harriman's group had recently made an agreement with the Hamburg America Line (HAPAG). HAPAG was short of ships, after surrendering nearly all of its fleet to the Entente powers as part of World War I reparations.

On 30 August, HF Kerr, President of the Kerr Navigation Company, announced the sale of eight ships of the Kerr fleet to Harriman's group for $4.9 million. However, on 5 September, the Internal Revenue Service, under Commissioner William F Williams, seized $4.9 million that Harriman and his associates had paid to the Kerr Navigation Corporation on 28 August via the Chase National Bank. The seizure seems to have been in lieu of a payment of excess profits tax. On 8 September, New York Supreme Court Justice Richard H. Mitchell issued a temporary injunction, restraining the American Ship and Commerce Company from taking control of Kerlew. The next day, Harriman's officials obtained from a US Marshal a libel on Kerlew and her cargo, which put US Marshals aboard her, and prevented Kerr Steamship Co officials from boarding her. On 10 September, Judge Mitchell held Harriman, plus his company vice-president, and his maritime lawyer, all to be in contempt of court. However, that same day, Judge Mitchell suspended punishment for the three men, after the NY Supreme Court was then informed that Harriman had restored Kerlew to the Kerr Steamship Co, and the libel had been quashed. Also by 10 September, the injunction included nine Kerr ships in total, and NY Supreme Court Justice Irving Lehman was considering extending the injunction until 25 October. The contracts under which the Kerr Steamship Co managed the ships of the Kerr Navigation Co were due to expire on 22 or 25 October (sources disagree as to the date). On 15 September, Judge Lehman ruled the sale of the ships illegal, and extended the injunctions on eight ships until 22 October.

The Vice-President of the Kerr Steamship Co, AE Clegg, believed that the contract between UAL and HAPAG was unfairly favourable to HAPAG, and against US interests. However, the Chairman of the USSB, Admiral William S. Benson, favoured the contract. In September 1920, Kerlew was allowed to leave New York, and on 3 October she reached Bremen.

== United American Lines ==
By 21 October 1920, UAL had gained control of ten Kerr ships, including Kerlew. The ships continued a weekly cargo service between Hamburg and New York, and also a service between Hamburg and the Río de la Plata, via ports in Brazil. On 13 November, Kerlew left New York for Emden and Hamburg. She reached Hamburg on 4 December. Her cargo included grain, which led to an infestation of rats aboard the ship. In December 1920 and January 1921, she returned to the US carrying general cargo; plus two thousand canaries, bullfinches, and goldfinches. The importer of the birds, Frank Vahls, said that the rats killed between 150 and 160 of them, that he poisoned 50 or more rats, and that he killed another 20 with his bare hands. Kerlew arrived in Philadelphia from Hamburg on 3 January 1921.

In November and December 1920, UAL advertised passenger berths aboard Kerlew from Philadelphia to Hamburg, due to leave Philadelphia on 4 January 1921. However, she did not reach Philadelphia until 3 January. By 11 January, Kerlew had been renamed Mount Sidney, presumably after Mount Sidney, Virginia, and had left Baltimore for Hamburg. However, as late as 24 January, passenger berths on her next eastward voyage, scheduled to leave Philadelphia on 5 March, were still being advertised under her former name Kerlew. In 1921, Mount Sidney's ports of call included Philadelphia, Baltimore, and Hamburg.

On 3 March 1921, Mount Sidney was arriving in Baltimore from Hamburg, en route to Philadelphia, when she grounded near Kent Island in Chesapeake Bay. Tugboats were sent to her aid, and at 12:40 hrs on 8 March she was refloated. She continued to trade until at least 10 May, when she arrived in Norfolk, VA, from Philadelphia.

== Repatriation ==
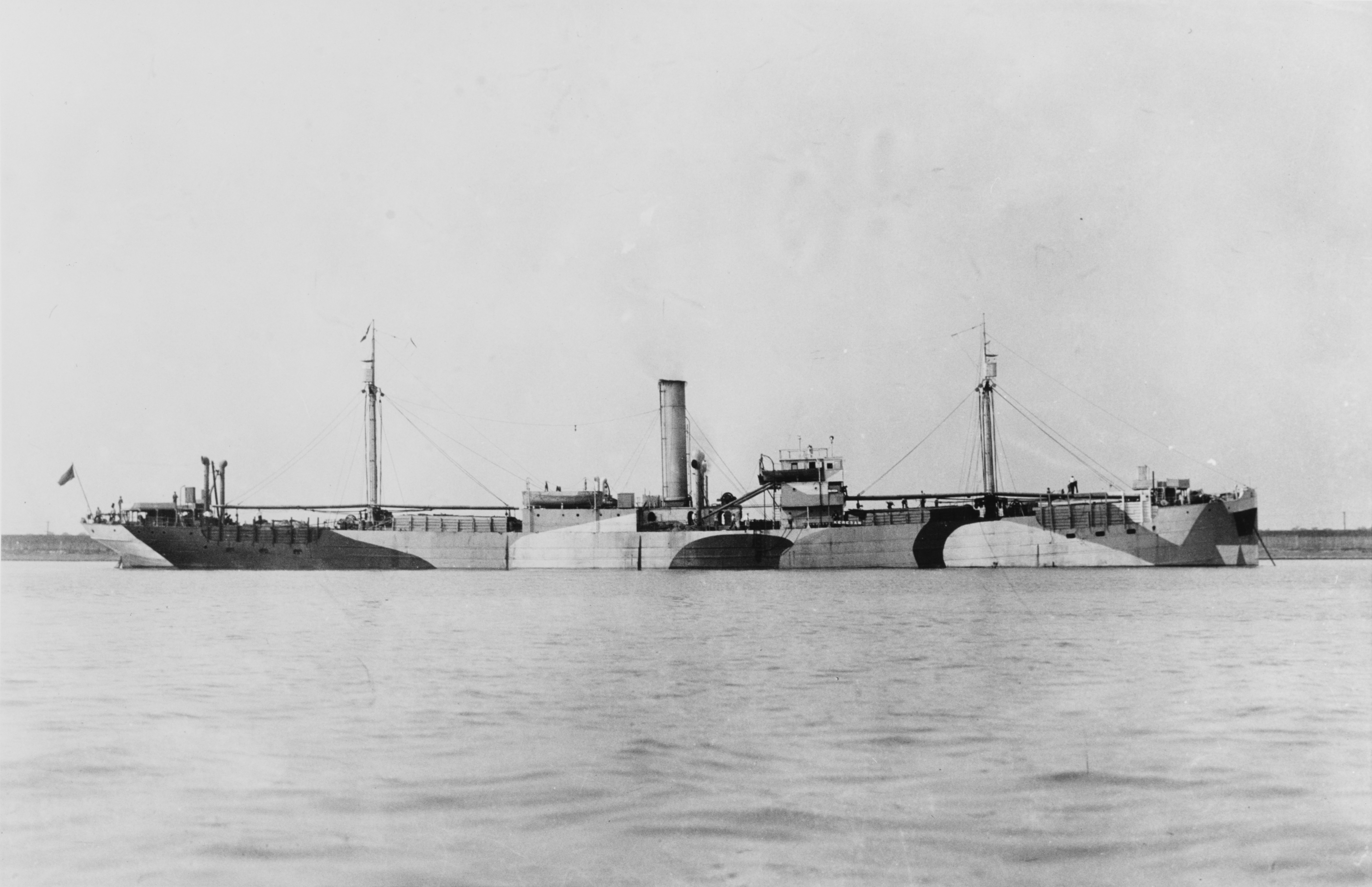
Keresan in 1918 or 1919

On 12 September 1921, it was reported that Mount Sidney and another UAL ship, Mount Seward (formerly Keresan), had been laid up in Baltimore "for two months". On 31 October, Mount Sidney was reported to have been laid up there for "several months". On 28 October, Mount Sidney and another UAL ship, Mount Summit (formerly Kerkenna), were described as "especially adapted to the Levant and Black Sea trades, but useless to the United American Lines". The USSB had granted permission for both ships to be transferred to the Hungarian registry, as UAL was negotiating to sell the ships to a Hungarian company. On 1 November, it was reported that the USSB had granted permission for the transfer "six weeks ago"; and that the Austrian Creditanstalt bank, HAPAG, and UAL were jointly creating a corporation called the Oesterreichsiche Reederei AG, ("Austrian Shipping Company, Ltd"). The USSB had given its permission on condition that Mount Sidney must not engage in US coastal trade.

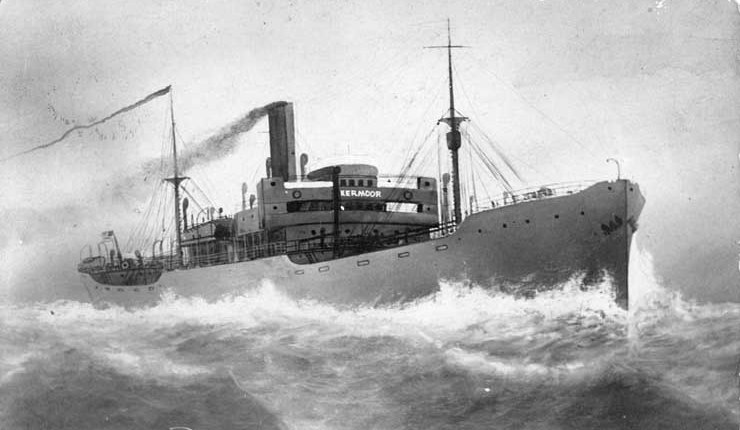
Kermoor, one of seven UAL ships that Oceana bought in 1922

Three months later, on 7 February 1922, it was announced that the Oceana Sea Navigation Co, Ltd had bought from UAL not only Mount Sidney and Mount Summit, but also Keresan, Keresaspa, Kermanshah, Kermoor, and Mount Sterling (formerly Kerowlee). Oceana renamed the ships, and registered them in Budapest. Kerlew was renamed Háros, apparently after Háros Island, which is on the Danube in Budapest. Her code letters were JSBG.

== Paolina Giuffrida ==
By 1928 an Italian shipowner, A Giuffrida, had bought Háros, and renamed her Paolina Giuffrida. He registered her in Catania, and by 1930 her code letters were PBWR. Paolina Giuffrida was scrapped in Venice in either the second half of 1932, or the first half of 1933.

== Bibliography ==
- Bureau of Navigation (1918). Fiftieth Annual List of Merchant Vessels of the United States (PDF). Washington, DC: United States Department of Commerce and Labor – via HyperWar.
- Bureau of Navigation (1921). Fifty-Third Annual List of Merchant Vessels of the United States (PDF). Washington, DC: United States Department of Commerce and Labor – via HyperWar.
- Haws, Duncan (2001). Italia 1881–2001. Merchant Fleets. Vol. 40. Pembroke. ISBN 0-946378-43-6.
- Lloyd's Register of British and Foreign Shipping. Vol. I.–Steamers. London: Lloyd's Register of Shipping. 1907 – via Internet Archive.
- Lloyd's Register of Shipping. Vol. II.–Steamers. London: Lloyd's Register of Shipping. 1919 – via Internet Archive.
- Lloyd's Register of Shipping. Vol. II.–Steamers. London: Lloyd's Register of Shipping. 1921 – via Internet Archive.
- Lloyd's Register of Shipping. Vol. II.–Steamers and Motor Vessels. London: Lloyd's Register of Shipping. 1922 – via Internet Archive.
- Lloyd's Register of Shipping. Vol. II.–Steamers and Motorships. London: Lloyd's Register of Shipping. 1928 – via Internet Archive.
- Lloyd's Register of Shipping (PDF). Vol. II.–Steamers and Motorships of 300 Tons Gross and Over. London: Lloyd's Register of Shipping. 1930 – via Southampton City Council.
- Lloyd's Register of Shipping (PDF). Vol. II.–Steamers and Motorships of 300 Tons Gross and Over. London: Lloyd's Register of Shipping. 1932 – via Southampton City Council.
