= Kerwood =

Kerwood may refer to:

- USS Kerwood (ID-1489), a United States Navy cargo ship in commission from 1918 to 1919
- Kerwood, a community in Adelaide Metcalfe, Ontario, Canada
- Charlotte Kerwood (born 1986), British sports shooter
