= Kerkenna =

Kerkenna may refer to:

- The Kerkenna Islands, an alternative spelling for the Kerkennah Islands
- USS Kerkenna, a United States Navy cargo ship in commission from 1918 to 1919
