= Keresaspa =

Keresaspa may refer to:

== Mythology ==
- Kərəsāspa, the Avestan form of the name of Garshasp, a monster-slaying hero in Iranian mythology

== Ships ==
- SS Keresaspa, a cargo ship that was renamed SS Malakoff in 1927
