= SS Malakoff =

Wreck diving site and former cargo steamship

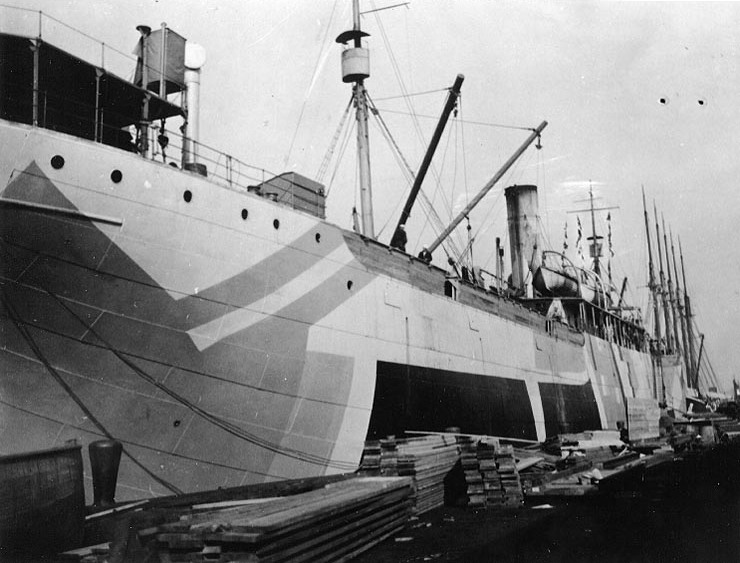
- The ship as USS Keresaspa, in about 1918

History
- Name: 1903: Franconia; 1917: Keresaspa; 1922: Pannonia; 1927: Malakoff
- Namesake: 1903: Franconia; 1917: Kərəsāspa; 1922: Pannonia; 1927: Duc de Malakoff
- Owner: 1903: Franconia SS Co; 1917: Kerr Navigation Corp; 1920: American S&C Corp; 1922: Oceana Sea Nav Co, Ltd; 1927: Soc Auxil des Chg Français
- Operator: 1903:D Tripcović; 1918: US Navy
- Port of registry: 1903: (Austria-Hungary) Trieste; 1917: (United States) New York; 1922: (Hungary) Budapest; 1927: (France) Rouen
- Builder: Northumberland Sb Co, Howdon
- Yard number: 100
- Launched: 13 February 1903
- Completed: April 1903
- Commissioned: into US Navy, 31 October 1918
- Decommissioned: from US Navy, 11 February 1919
- Identification: 1903: code letters HJLQ; 1917: US official number 215399; 1917: code letters LHPJ; 1918: Naval Registry ID-1484; 1922: code letters JZBL; by 1928: code letters OTJB
- Fate: wrecked, 2 January 1929

General characteristics
- Type: cargo steamship
- Tonnage: 4,637 GRT, 3,019 NRT
- Length: 360.8 ft (110.0 m)
- Beam: 48.0 ft (14.6 m)
- Draft: 13 ft 5 in (4.09 m)
- Depth: 20.2 ft (6.2 m)
- Decks: 1
- Installed power: 1 × triple-expansion engine, 1,785 ihp, 357 NHP
- Propulsion: 1 × screw
- Speed: 9 knots (17 km/h)
- Complement: in US Navy, 86
- Crew: in 1929, 31
- Armament: in US Navy: 1 × 5 in (130 mm) naval gun
- Notes: sister ship: Ellenia

SS Malakoff was a cargo steamship, and is now a shipwreck and wreck diving site in the Mediterranean Sea. She was built in England in 1903 as Franconia for an Austro-Hungarian shipping company. The US interned her in 1914. In 1917 the US seized her, and sold her to the Kerr Navigation Corporation, who renamed her Keresaspa. The United States Navy requisitioned her in October 1918, and commissioned her as USS Keresaspa (ID-1484). She was decommissioned in and returned to her owner in 1919. The American Shipping and Commerce Corporation acquired her in 1920. A Hungarian company bought her in 1922, and renamed her Pannonia. A French company bought her in 1927, and renamed her Malakoff. She was wrecked on the coast of Menorca in 1929, with the loss of 27 lives. Her wreck is now rich in marine life, and is a recreational diving site.

== Ellenia and Franconia ==
In 1900, the Northumberland Shipbuilding Company at Howdon, on the River Tyne in North East England built a cargo steamship for Diodato Tripcović, a shipowner in Trieste, which then was part of Austria-Hungary. She was built as yard number 88, launched in October 1900 as Ellenia, and completed that November. In 1903, the same shipyard built a sister ship for the same owners. She was built as yard number 100, launched on 13 February 1903, and completed that April.

Franconia's length was 360.8 ft (110.0 m), her beam was 48.0 ft (14.6 m), her depth was 20.2 ft (6.2 m), and her draft was 13 ft 5 in (4.09 m). Her tonnages were 4,637 GRT, 3,019 NRT. She had a single screw, driven by a three-cylinder triple-expansion engine, built by the North East Marine Engineering Company of Newcastle. It was rated at 357 NHP, or 1,785 ihp, and gave her a speed of 9 knots (17 km/h).

Tripcović created single-ship companies to own some of his ships. The Franconia Steamship Company owned Franconia, but Tripcović managed her. He registered her at Trieste, and her code letters were HJLQ.

== Internment ==
When the First World War began in August 1914, Germany and Austria-Hungary ordered their merchant ships to return home if possible, or otherwise take shelter in a neutral port. Franconia stayed in Philadelphia, and by 24 December 1914, she was in the Port Richmond part of the city. Three German ships also sheltered in Philadelphia: the Hamburg America Line ships Prinz Oskar and Rhaetia at the foot of Catharine Street, and the cargo ship Ems at Point Breeze on the Schuylkill River. From the beginning of the war, US authorities placed interned ships of the Central Powers under guard.

A total of 14 Austro-Hungarian merchant ships took refuge in US ports. Among them were another two of Tripcović's ships: Campania, in Galveston; and Himalaia, in New York.

By 1 January 1917, Franconia, Prinz Oskar, and Rhaetia were all still in Philadelphia. On 1 February 1917, Germany resumed unrestricted submarine warfare against the Entente Powers. On 4 February the US government ordered that the crews of Central Powers ships in US-controlled ports be confined to their ships. The Collector of Customs of the Port of Philadelphia increased the number of US Customs men guarding Franconia, Prinz Oskar, and Rhaetia.

== Seizure ==
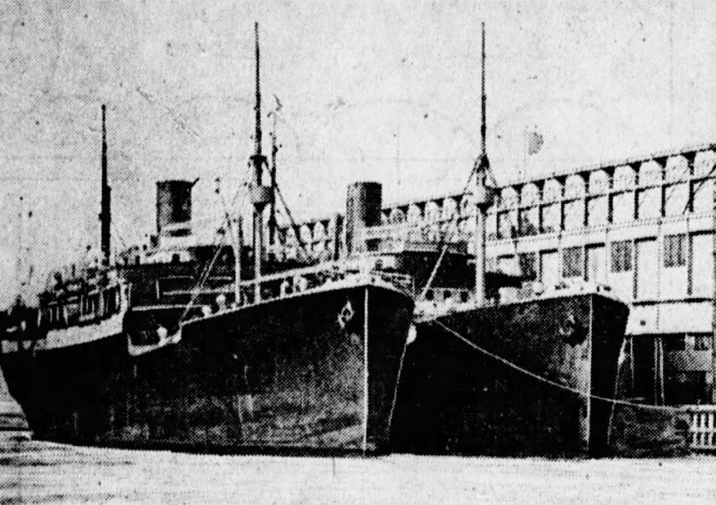
Hamburg America Line's Prinz Oskar and Rhaetia in Philadelphia

On 6 April 1917, the US declared war against Germany, and seized all German ships in its ports. US Marines boarded and seized Prinz Oskar and Rhaetia, which by then were moored at 40 South Wharves.

The US did not declare war against Austria-Hungary, so the 14 Austro-Hungarian ships in US ports were not seized. However, two days later, Austria-Hungary terminated diplomatic relations with the US, so the US responded by seizing all of those Austro-Hungarian ships. On 9 April, the Collector sent six US Customs officers aboard Franconia to seize her. They found a skeleton crew of only four men aboard. Her Master was absent, having notified the Collector that he would be on holiday in Washington.

== Kerr Navigation Corporation ==
By August 1917, the Kerr Navigation Corporation had bought Franconia. She was one of eight Austro-Hungarian cargo ships that Kerr bought; with a combined tonnage of almost 57,000 GRT; for a total of $12 million. Kerr renamed its acquisitions, and registered them in New York. Franconia became Keresaspa, presumably named after Kərəsāspa, a hero in Persian mythology. She was given the US official number 215399, and code letters LHPJ. By 15 August, Kerr was using the eight ships in transatlantic trade.

On 31 October 1918, the US Navy commissioned the ship as USS Keresaspa, with the Naval Registry Identification Number 1484, and Lieutenant Commander James J Boyce as her commanding officer. She was defensively armed with one 5 in (130 mm) naval gun, and painted in dazzle camouflage. She was assigned to the Naval Overseas Transportation Service, and took 400 horses and mules from New York to La Pallice in France, where she arrived on 15 December, before continuing to Saint-Nazaire.

Keresaspa left France on 24 December, bringing home a number of US troops. Some reports said she carried six officers and 144 men; others said that she carried 39 casuals. She was scheduled to reach Newport News on 13 January 1919, but in fact arrived on 17 January. She continued to Baltimore, where she arrived on 20 January. On 23 January, the United States Shipping Board gave notice that 18 merchant ships, including Keresaspa, would be returned to their owners. She was repaired, and on 11 February was decommissioned and returned to her owner.

Back in merchant service, in March 1919 Keresaspa left New York for Copenhagen and Gothenburg. She encountered heavy weather, in which she was damaged, and lost 85 percent of her deck cargo. On 9 April, she put into Falmouth, England, for repair. She reached Gothenburg on 20 May. Later in 1919, she sailed from New York via Bahia to Rio de Janeiro, where she arrived on 15 December.

== United American Lines ==
In the latter part of 1920, Keresaspa sailed from Montevideo to Hamburg, where she arrived on 15 October. By 21 October 1920, the American Shipping and Commerce Corporation (United American Lines) had acquired ten Kerr ships, including Keresaspa. The ships continued a weekly cargo service between Hamburg and New York, and also a service between Hamburg and the Río de la Plata, via ports in Brazil. On 29 December, Keresaspa left Buenos Aires for Hamburg. En route, she called at Santa Cruz de Tenerife on 30 January 1921.

== Pannonia ==
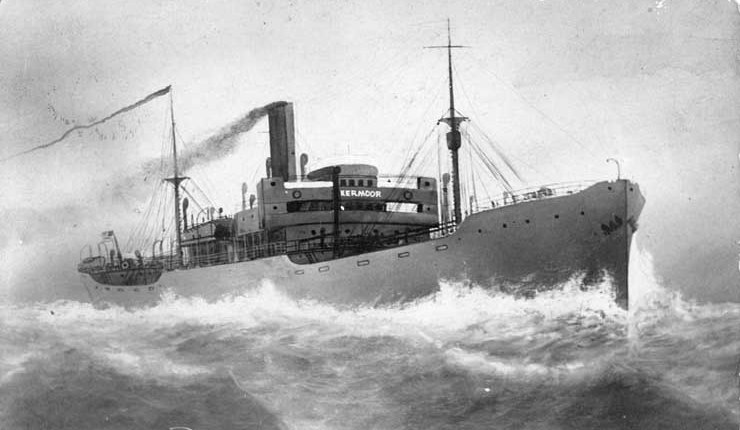
Kermoor, one of seven ships that Oceana bought in 1922

On 7 February 1922, it was announced that the Oceana Sea Navigation Co, Ltd, had bought seven former Austro-Hungarian merchant ships from the American Shipping and Commerce Corporation. Keresaspa was one of them; along with Kerkenna, Kermanshah, Kermoor, Mount Seward (formerly Keresan), Mount Sterling (formerly Kerowlee), and Mount Summit (formerly Kerlew). Oceana renamed the ships, and registered them in Budapest. Keresaspa became Pannonia, after the former Roman province of Pannonia. Her code letters were JZBL.

== Malakoff ==
In 1927, the Société Auxiliaire des Chargeurs Français bought Pannonia, and renamed her Malakoff, apparently after Aimable Pélissier, who was created Duc de Malakoff after capturing the Malakhov Kurgan in the Battle of Malakoff in 1855 in the Crimean War. She was registered in Rouen, and by 1928 her code letters were OTJB.

In December 1928, Malakoff left either Antwerp, or Dunkirk and Le Havre, (sources differ), with a cargo of bagged cement for Madagascar via Algiers. Her Master was a Captain Quemper. Reports of the number of people aboard vary, but the likely figures seem to be 30 or 31 officers and crew, plus two or three women passengers. One of the latter was Mme Quemper, the Master's wife, who boarded at Brest, and was to disembark at Marseille to return home to their children.

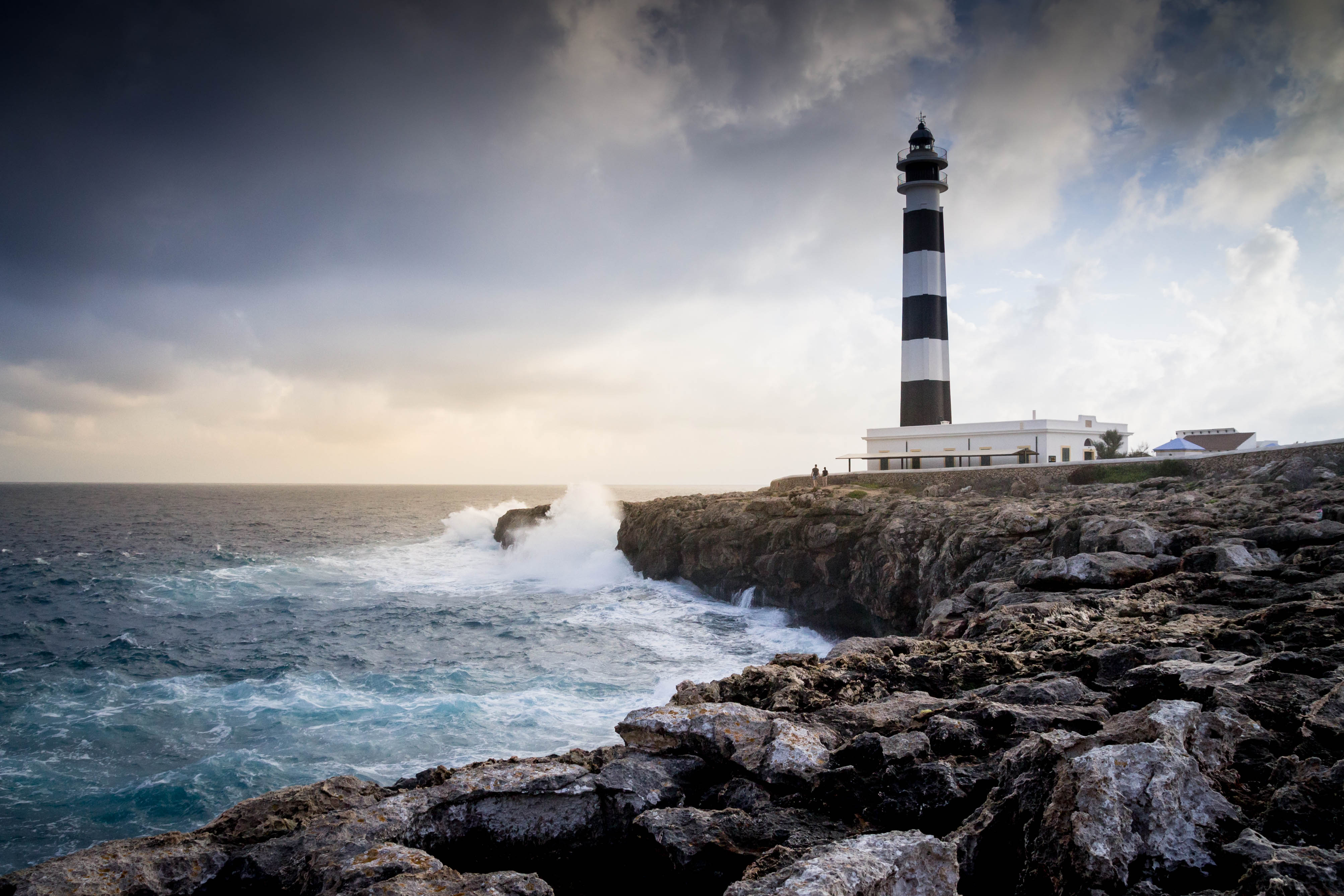
Cap d'Artrutx Lighthouse

Malakoff entered the Mediterranean via the Strait of Gibraltar. She was caught in a storm off Menorca on 2 or 3 January. At night, in rain and fog, her lookouts, helmsman, and officer of the watch failed to see Cap d'Artrutx Lighthouse. She struck rocks off Cap d'Artrutx, and sank in six or seven minutes. The heavy sea, and the speed with which she sank, prevented her crew from launching her lifeboats. All of those killed were asleep in their bunks, and there was no time to rouse them. One sailor swam ashore, and the French cargo steamship Ville de Paris reported the rescue of three survivors. The survivors were cared for in Ciutadella de Menorca.

Sources vary as to the number of people killed, and the number who survived. It seems that 27 were killed, including Captain Quemper, and the two or three women; and six survived, being one officer and five crewmen who were on watch when the ship grounded. However, there were also news agency reports of 38 people missing, and 44 survivors, including two women.

== Wreck ==
Malakoff's wreck lies upright on the seabed, at 39°55′04″N 3°57′25″E. The seabed is 38 to 40 metres (125 to 131 ft) below sea level, and her deck is 30 to 32 metres (98 to 105 ft) below sea level. Visibility at the level of the wreck is about 19 metres (62 ft). In the 1950s, salvage divers used explosives to remove her superstructure above deck level, and gain access to her boilers and engine. Ceramic tiles, crockery, and cutlery, can still be found in the wreck. The wreck is suitable for advanced, experienced divers only; because of its depth, and strong currents.

Her cargo of bagged cement has set, creating an artificial reef with many holes in it. Diverse marine life has colonised the reef, including sponges, red sea squirts, and sea slugs. The wreck attracts damselfish, red mullet, barracudas, congers, groupers, rare species of triggerfish.

== Bibliography ==
- Bureau of Navigation (1918). Fiftieth Annual List of Merchant Vessels of the United States (PDF). Washington, DC: United States Department of Commerce and Labor – via HyperWar.
- Lloyd's Register of British and Foreign Shipping. Vol. I.–Steamers. London: Lloyd's Register of Shipping. 1904 – via Internet Archive.
- Lloyd's Register of Shipping. Vol. II.–Steamers. London: Lloyd's Register of Shipping. 1919 – via Internet Archive.
- Lloyd's Register of Shipping. Vol. II.–Steamers and Motor Vessels. London: Lloyd's Register of Shipping. 1922 – via Internet Archive.
- Lloyd's Register of Shipping. Vol. II.–Steamers and Motorships. London: Lloyd's Register of Shipping. 1927 – via Internet Archive.
- Lloyd's Register of Shipping. Vol. II.–Steamers and Motorships. London: Lloyd's Register of Shipping. 1928 – via Internet Archive.
