= USS Kerowlee =

Cargo steamship that served in the US Navy

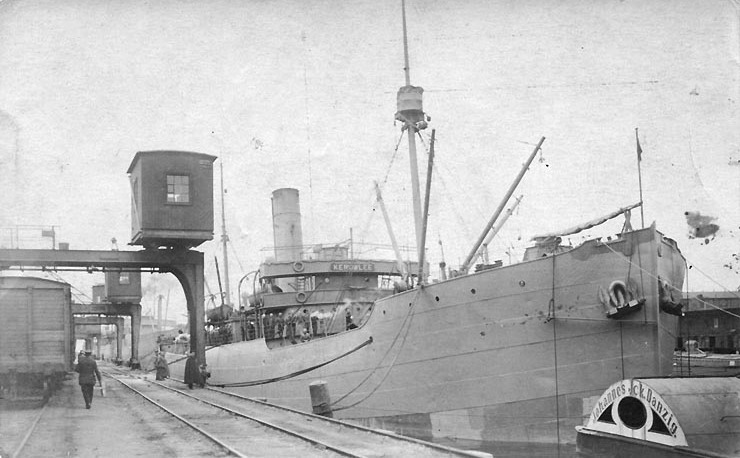
- USS Kerowlee in port in 1919, possibly in Danzig

History
- Name: 1901: Campania; 1917: Kerowlee; 1921: Mount Sterling; 1922: Balaton; 1927: Nicolaos A.; 1931: Evi
- Namesake: 1901: Campania; 1917: Karauli; 1921: Mount Sterling; 1922: Lake Balaton
- Owner: 1901: Campania SS Co, Ltd; 1917: Kerr Navigation Corp; 1920: American S&C Corp; 1922: Oceana Sea Nav Co, Ltd; 1927: NG Livanos
- Operator: 1901: L Kosović & D Tripcović; 1904: D Tripcović; 1917: US Army; 1918: US Navy
- Port of registry: 1901: (Austria-Hungary) Trieste; 1917: (United States) New York; 1922: (Hungary) Budapest; 1927: (Greece) Chios
- Route: 1920: Philadelphia – Baltimore – Hamburg
- Builder: J Readhead & Sons, S Shields
- Yard number: 352
- Launched: 18 February 1901
- Completed: March 1901
- Commissioned: into US Navy, 17 October 1918
- Decommissioned: from US Navy, 11 August 1919
- Identification: code letters HDJS; 1917: US official number 215400; 1917: code letters LHPK; 1922: code letters JZBD; 1928: code letters JCNP
- Fate: scrapped, 1933

General characteristics
- Type: cargo steamship
- Tonnage: 3,076 GRT, 2,267 NRT
- Displacement: 3,350 tons
- Length: 350 ft (110 m) overall; 341.2 ft (104.0 m) registered
- Beam: 46.7 ft (14.2 m)
- Draft: 23 ft 0 in (7.01 m)
- Depth: 37.8 ft (11.5 m)
- Decks: 1
- Installed power: 1 × triple-expansion engine, 1,475 ihp, 295 NHP
- Propulsion: 1 × screw
- Speed: 10 knots (19 km/h)
- Complement: in US Navy: 84
- Armament: 1918: 2 × 3-inch/50-caliber guns
- Notes: sister ship: Dardania

USS Kerowlee was a cargo steamship. She was built in England in 1901 as Campania for an Austro-Hungarian shipping company. The US interned her in 1914. In 1917 the US seized her, and sold her to the Kerr Navigation Corporation, who renamed her Kerowlee. The US Army took her over in December 1917. The United States Navy requisitioned her in October 1918, and commissioned her as USS Kerowlee. She was decommissioned in and returned to her owner in August 1919. The American Shipping and Commerce Corporation bought her in 1920, and by the end of that year had renamed her Mount Sterling. A Hungarian company bought her in 1922, and renamed her Balaton. A member of the Livanos Greek shipping family bought her in 1927, and renamed her Nicolaos A.. She was renamed Evi in 1931, and scrapped in Italy in 1933.

== Campania and Dardania ==
In 1899 and 1900, John Readhead & Sons of South Shields, on the River Tyne in North East England, built a pair of sister ships, of about 3,090 GRT each, for Lorenzo Kosović, an Austro-Hungarian shipowner. Yard number 339 was launched in April 1899 as Arcadia, and yard number 350 was launched in November 1900 as Bitinia.

Kosović went into partnership with Diodato Tripcović, and in 1901 Readhead built a pair of larger ships for the partners. Yard number 352 was launched on 18 February 1901 as Campania, and completed that March. Yard number 353 was launched on 16 April 1901 as Dardania, and completed that May.

Campania's lengths were 350 ft (110 m) overall, and 341.2 ft (104.0 m) registered. Her beam was 46.7 ft (14.2 m), her depth was 37.8 ft (11.5 m), and her draft was 23 ft 0 in (7.01 m). Her tonnages were 3,076 GRT, 2,267 NRT, and 3,350 tons displacement. She had a single screw, driven by a three-cylinder triple-expansion engine. It was rated at 295 NHP, or 1,475 ihp, and gave her a speed of 10 knots (19 km/h).

Kosović and Tripcović created single-ship companies to own some of their ships. The Campania Steamship Company owned Campania, and the Dardania Steamship Company owned Dardania, but both ships were managed by Kosović and Tripcović. They registered Campania at Trieste. Her code letters were HDJS. By 1904, Tripcović was listed as her sole manager.

== Internment ==
When the First World War began in August 1914, Campania took refuge in Galveston, Texas. By 17 August, another Austro-Hungarian cargo steamship, Morawitz, had also arrived in Galveston. They were two among a total of 14 Austro-Hungarian merchant ships took refuge in US ports. Among them were another two of Tripcović's ships, Franconia, Philadelphia; and Himalaia, in New York.

By 18 August 1916, Campania been towed upriver to the turning basin of the Houston Ship Channel. On 1 September, Morawitz followed her.

== Seizure ==
At the beginning of February 1917, the Major commanding the coastal artillery near Galveston inquired into the condition of Campania and Morawitz. He refused to give any details as to the nature of his orders.

On 6 April 1917, the US declared war against Germany, and seized all German ships in its ports. The US did not declare war against Austria-Hungary, so the 14 Austro-Hungarian ships in US ports were not seized. However, two days later, Austria-Hungary terminated diplomatic relations with the US, so the US responded by seizing all of those Austro-Hungarian ships. Late on the afternoon of 9 April, US deputy marshals seized both Campania and Morawitz, and took their masters and crews to the immigration headquarters on Pelican Island. The boilers of both ships were found to have been disabled. Their masters, Captain Rakos of Morowitz and Captain Lupis of Campania, said they had been ordered to disable their ships' machinery. By 25 May, Morawitz had been towed from the turning basin back to Galveston, and Campania was to follow.

== Kerr Navigation Corporation ==
By August 1917, the Kerr Navigation Corporation had bought Campania. She was one of eight Austro-Hungarian cargo ships that Kerr bought; with a combined tonnage of almost 57,000 GRT; for a total of $12 million. Kerr renamed its acquisitions, and registered them in New York. Campania became Kerowlee, which is an old spelling of Karauli, a city in Rajasthan. She was given the US official number 215400, and code letters LHPK. By 15 August, those ships which had been damaged by their crews had been repaired, and Kerr was using them in transatlantic trade.

On 1 December 1917, Kerowlee was in Le Havre, France, when the US Army took her over. She was defensively armed with two 3-inch/50-caliber guns. On 17 October 1918, she was in Cardiff in Wales, when the US Navy requisitioned her. She was commissioned with Lieutenant Commander WL Strong, USNRF, as her commanding officer. Unusually, she was not given a Naval Registry Identification Number. On 3 November, she left Cardiff for Brest. She carried coal and military supplies across the English Channel between Britain and France. On 11 April 1919, she was assigned to the United States Food Administration to carry food between Saint-Nazaire and Danzig. On 1 June, she was transferred to the United States Shipping Board (USSB) account. and on 4 June she left Rotterdam for New York. She left St-Nazaire on 8 July with an Army cargo to the US, calling at Cardiff, where she left on 10 July. On 24 July she was expected in New York, but she seems to have put into in Norfolk, Virginia instead, on 25 July. On 11 August was decommissioned from the Navy, and returned via the USSB to her owner.

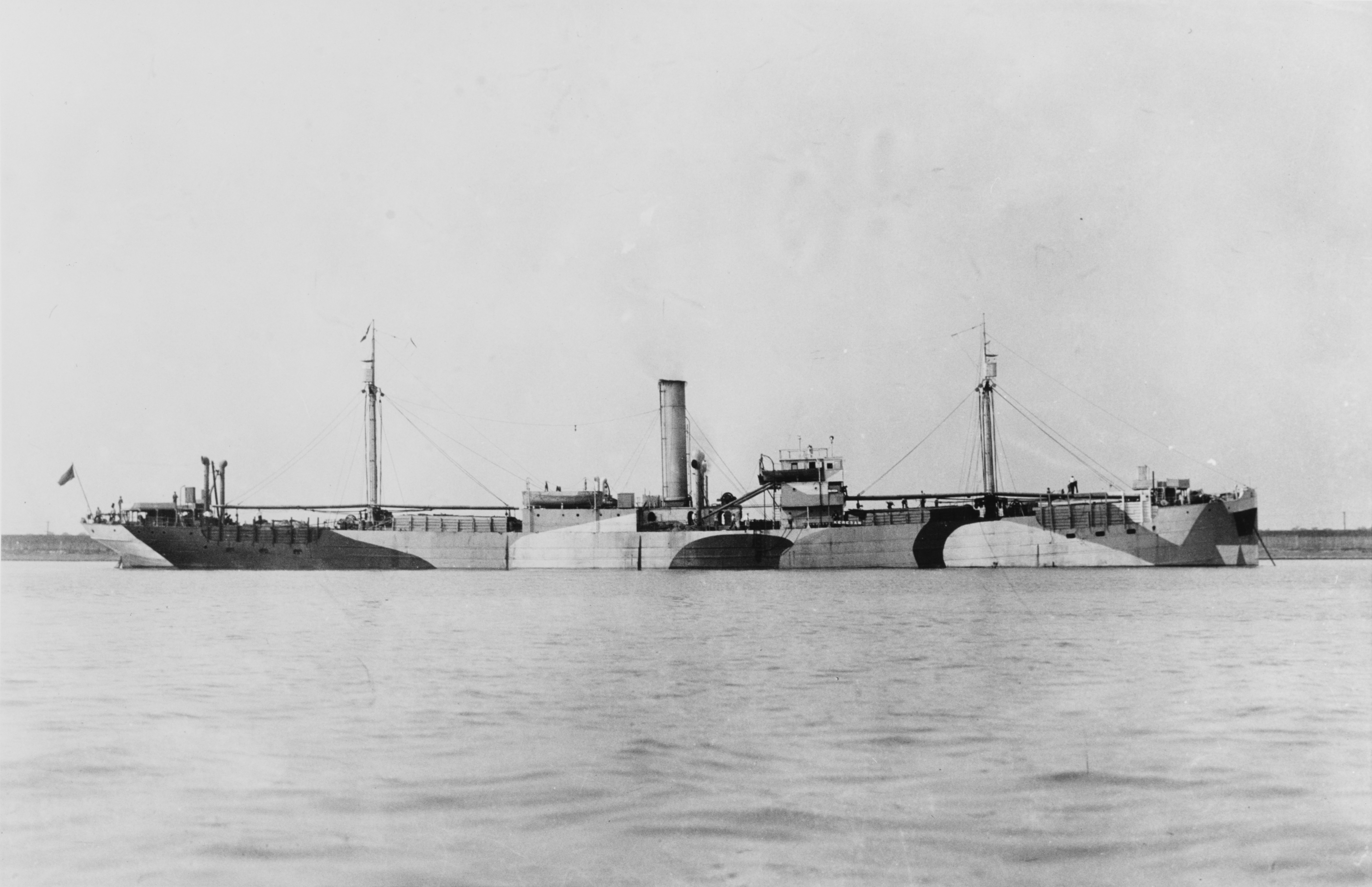
Kerr's Keresan in camouflage in 1918

Back with her civilian owner, Kerowlee left Norfolk the same day, and on 13 August she reached New York. Kerr ran her between Hamburg and the US ports of Baltimore, New York, and Norfolk, VA, continuing into 1920. On at least one eastbound sailing, which left New York on 26 November 1919, she carried mail destined for Germany, Austria, and Czechoslovakia; and emergency aid organised by the Central Committee for the Relief of Distress in Germany and Austria. At the same time, three other cargo ships carried relief from the US destined for Germany and Austria: Kerr's Keresan and Kerwood, and the Spanish Mar Rojo. Kerowlee was one of at least five Kerr ships that continued to trade between the US and Hamburg in 1920, in partnership with Hamburg America Line.

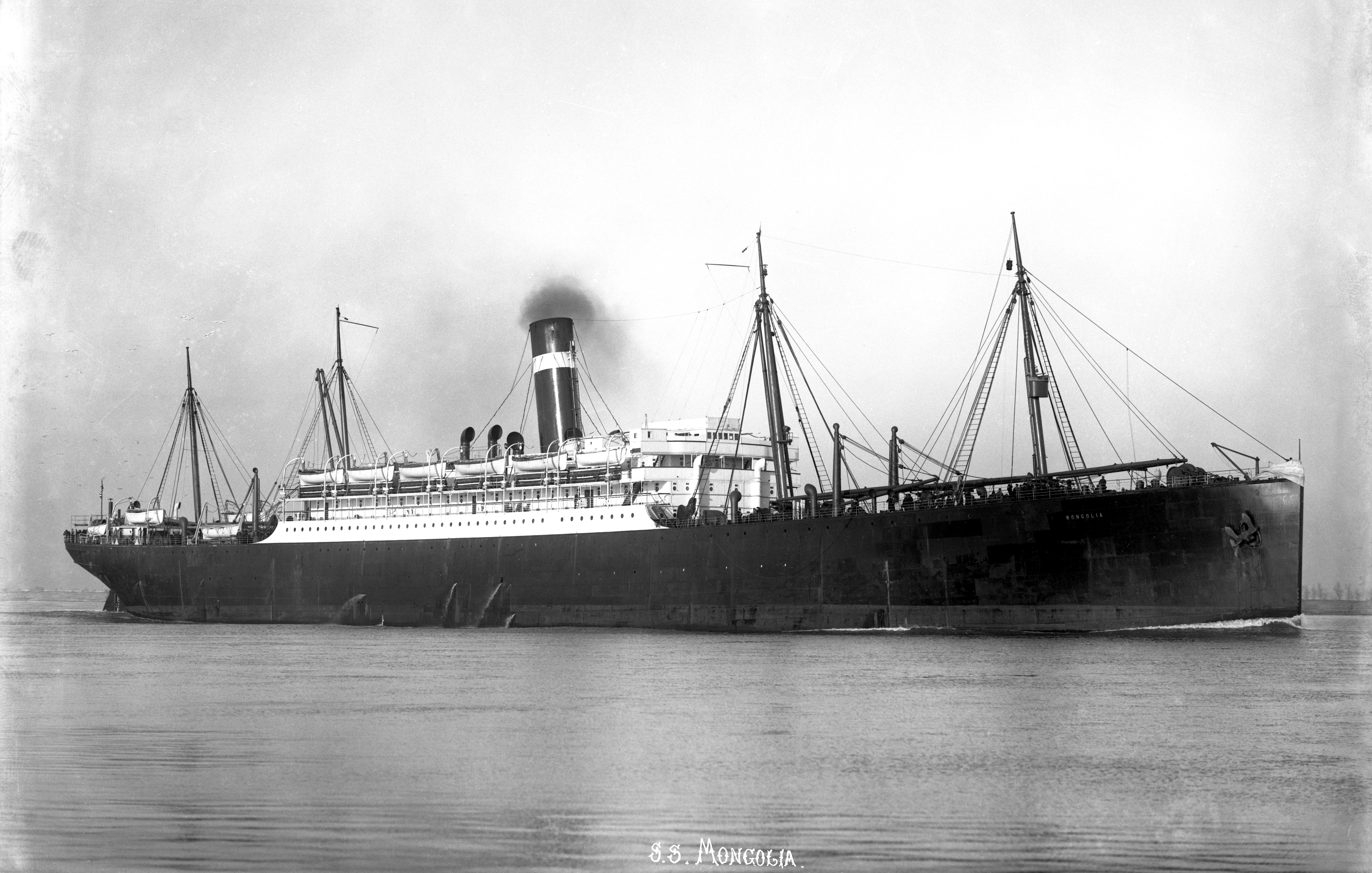
The ocean liner Mongolia, which repatriated Kerowlee's crew in May 1920

In late March 1920, Kerowlee grounded at the mouth of the Weser, the river on which are the ports of Bremen and Bremerhaven. She was refloated at 15:00 hrs on 25 March, and went to Schillig Road for her hull to be examined. On 30 March, she reached the mouth of the Elbe, on her way to Hamburg. She was found to be unseaworthy, so that May her crew was repatriated to New York aboard Atlantic Transport Line's passenger liner Mongolia. The number of her officers and ratings aboard Mongolia was variously reported as 33 or 37.

== United American Lines ==
In October 1920, United American Lines acquired ten Kerr ships, including Kerowlee. The ships continued a weekly cargo service between Hamburg and New York, and also a service between Hamburg and the Río de la Plata, via ports in Brazil. By November 1920, Kerowlee's advertised route was between Philadelphia and Hamburg, in a service run jointly by United American Lines and Hamburg America Line. She also served Baltimore, MD, and New Orelans. By December 1920, Kerowlee was also serving Stettin, on the Baltic coast of Germany (now Szczecin in Poland). By 1 January 1921, Kerowlee had been renamed Mount Sterling. She continued to run between Philadelphia, Baltimore, and Hamburg until at least the end of January 1921.

== Hungarian and Greek ownership ==
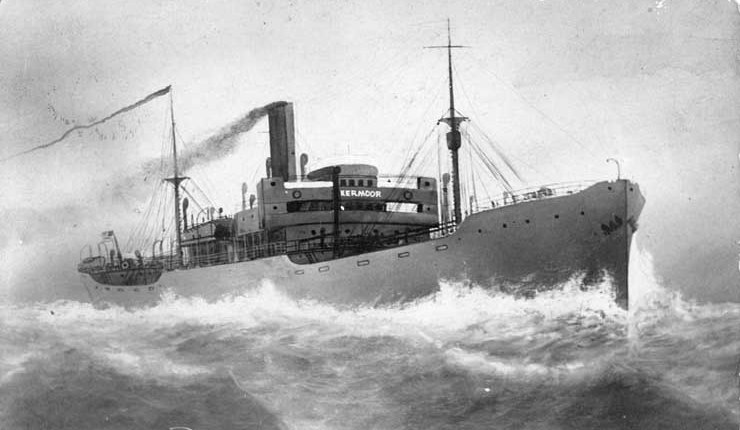
Kermoor, one of seven ships that Oceana bought in 1922

On 7 February 1922, it was announced that the Oceana Sea Navigation Co, Ltd, had bought seven former Austro-Hungarian merchant ships from the American Shipping and Commerce Corporation. Mount Sterling was one of them; along with Keresaspa, Kerkenna, Kermoor, Kermanshah, Mount Seward (formerly Keresan), and Mount Summit (formerly Kerlew). Oceana renamed the ships, and registered them in Budapest. Mount Sterling became Balaton, after Lake Balaton in Hungary. Her code letters were JZBF.

In 1927, NG Livanos, a relative of Stavros G. Livanos, bought Balaton. He renamed her Nicolaos A., and registered her in Chios in Greece. By 1928, her code letters were JCNP. In 1931, she was renamed Evi. In the third quarter of 1933, she was scrapped in Italy.

== Bibliography ==
- Bureau of Navigation (1918). Fiftieth Annual List of Merchant Vessels of the United States (PDF). Washington, DC: United States Department of Commerce and Labor – via HyperWar.
- Bureau of Navigation (1921). Fifty-Third Annual List of Merchant Vessels of the United States (PDF). Washington, DC: United States Department of Commerce and Labor – via HyperWar.
- Lloyd's Register of British and Foreign Shipping. Vol. I.–Steamers. London: Lloyd's Register of Shipping. 1902 – via Internet Archive.
- Lloyd's Register of British and Foreign Shipping. Vol. I.–Steamers. London: Lloyd's Register of Shipping. 1904 – via Internet Archive.
- Lloyd's Register of Shipping. Vol. II.–Steamers. London: Lloyd's Register of Shipping. 1921 – via Internet Archive.
- Lloyd's Register of Shipping. Vol. II.–Steamers and Motor Vessels. London: Lloyd's Register of Shipping. 1922 – via Internet Archive.
- Lloyd's Register of Shipping. Vol. II.–Steamers and Motorships. London: Lloyd's Register of Shipping. 1927 – via Internet Archive.
- Lloyd's Register of Shipping. Vol. II.–Steamers and Motorships. London: Lloyd's Register of Shipping. 1928 – via Internet Archive.
- Lloyd's Register of Shipping (PDF). Vol. II.–Steamers and Motorships of 300 Tons Gross and Over. London: Lloyd's Register of Shipping. 1931 – via Southampton City Council.
