= Kerowlee =

Kerowlee may refer to:

== Places ==
- Kerowlee, a former spelling of Karauli, a town in the state of Rajasthan in India

== Ships ==
- USS Kerowlee, a cargo ship that was in United States Navy from 1918 to 1919
