= Kerr Steamship Company =

Shipping Company

- Industry: Maritime transport
- Founded: 1916
- Founder: H. Farquharson Kerr
- Fate: Sold in 1994
- Successor: Norton Lilly International
- Headquarters: New York City
- Area served: Worldwide
- Key people: A.E. Clegg
- Services: passenger and cargo liners

Kerr Steamship Company, Kerr Company, ran passenger and cargo ships from New York City the Dutch East Indies, Ceylon, Egypt and other ports. Kerr Company was founded in 1916, and was sold to Norton Lilly International in 1994 after a Kerr-Norton joint venture that started in 1981. In the 1920s Kerr Steamship Company was the largest steamship company in the United States. Kerr Steamship Company served during World War I taking supplies to the War. Kerr Steamship Company opened an office at 7 Rue Scribe, Paris and ran docks at Bordeaux. Later, Kerr Steamship Company opened operations in Marseilles, Chicago, and New Orleans to support the war effort. In the “K” Line shipping system, the Kerr Steamship Company shipped most and sometimes all the cargo in Atlantic Ocean, "K" Line-Kerr Corporation. In 1994 Kerr Company was the sub-agent for United Arab Shipping Company, and is an agent for Torm West Africa Line, Alliance Navigation, Compagnie Generale Maritime, and Compania Chilena de Navegacion Interoceanica. Kerr was the sub-agent in the South Atlantic region for the "K" Line America.

== Early steamships ==
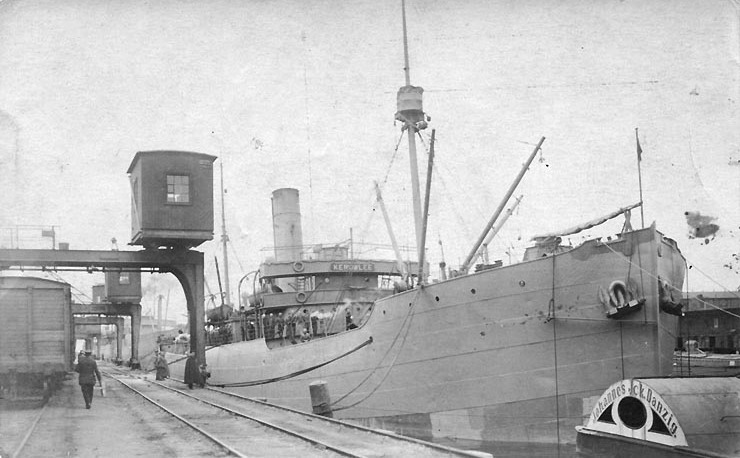
Kerowlee in port in 1919, possibly at Danzig (now Gdańsk)

Early Kerr steamships:

- Kerkenna (was Borneo, completed 1900)
- Kerowlee (was Campania, completed 1901)
- Keresaspa (was Franconia, completed 1903)
- Kerlew (was Virginia, completed 1906)
- Kermoor (was Morawitz, completed 1907)
- Kermanshah (was Himalaia, completed 1910)
- Kerwood (was Budapest, completed 1911)
- Keresan (was Erodiade, completed 1912)
- Rochester, sunk 1917 by U-boat (was Yagüez)
- Malama (1919)
- Shoshone (1911)
- Mount Clay (1904)
- DeKalb (1904)

== World War II ==
Kerr-Silver line:

- Bowness Park
- Mohawk Park
- Fort St. Antoine
- Fort Dearborn

Tanker:

- Andrew Dillion (1950s)

== Kerr-Silver Services ==
- Kerr-Silver Services 1920-1930's ships:
- Silversandal
- Silverteak
- Silvercypress
- Silveryew
- Silverwalnut
- Silverpalm
- Silverwillow
- Silvermaple
- Silveroak
- Silverelm
- Silverguava
- Silverbelle
- Silverash
- Silverbeech
- Silverhazel
- Silverlarch
- Silverpine
- Silvercypress
- Silversandal
- Silverteak
- Silverwalnut
- Silveryew

- Prince Line services: 1930's ships, working with Stanley & John Thompson of the United Kingdom (later merged with Java Pacific) :
- Chinese Prince
- Cingalese Prince
- Javanese Prince
- Malayan Prince
- Siamese Prince

== See also ==
- Yusuf bin Ahmed Kanoo
