= USS Kerwood =

Cargo steamship that served in the US Navy

History
- Name: 1911: Budapest; 1917: Kerwood
- Namesake: 1911: Budapest
- Owner: 1911: "Atlantica" SN Co, Ltd; 1917: Kerr Navigation Corp; 1919: American S&C Corp
- Operator: 1918: US Navy
- Port of registry: 1911: (Austria-Hungary) Fiume; 1917: (United States) New York
- Builder: Richardson, Duck & Co, Stockton
- Yard number: 616
- Launched: 28 February 1911
- Completed: March 1911
- Commissioned: into the US Navy, 5 Nov 1918
- Decommissioned: from US Navy, 19 March 1919
- Identification: 1911: code letters JCQT; 1917: US official number 215397; 1917: code letters LHPF; 1918: Naval Registry ID-1489
- Fate: mined, 1 December 1919

General characteristics
- Type: cargo steamship
- Tonnage: 3,651 GRT, 2,321 NRT
- Length: 331.0 ft (100.9 m)
- Beam: 48.3 ft (14.7 m)
- Draft: 21 ft 4 1/2 in (6.52 m)
- Depth: 22.2 ft (6.8 m)
- Decks: 1
- Installed power: 1 × triple-expansion engine, 1,480 ihp, 296 NHP
- Propulsion: 1 × screw
- Speed: 10 knots (19 km/h)
- Complement: in US Navy: 52
- Crew: in merchant service: 36
- Armament: 1918: 2 × 3-inch/50-caliber guns
- Notes: sister ship: Fiume

USS Kerwood (ID-1489) was a cargo steamship. She was built in England in 1911 as Budapest for an Austro-Hungarian shipping company. The US interned her in 1914. In 1917 the US seized her, and sold her to the Kerr Navigation Corporation, who renamed her Kerwood. The United States Navy requisitioned her in 1918, and commissioned her as USS Kerwood. She was decommissioned in and returned to her owner in March 1919, and sunk by a mine in December 1919.

== Budapest and her sisters ==
In 1907, William Gray & Company of West Hartlepool, on the River Tees in North East England, built a class of four cargo steamships for the "Atlantica" Steam Navigation Co, Ltd of Fiume in Austria-Hungary (now Rijeka in Croatia). Yard numbers 741 and 742 were launched on 28 February 1907 as Szterényi and Magyarorszag respectively. Yard numbers 743 and 744 were launched on 28 March that year as Gróf Serenyi Bela and Pollacsek respectively.

In 1911, Richardson, Duck and Company of Stockton-on-Tees, built a further pair of sister ships for "Atlantica" to the same dimensions. Yard number 616 was launched on 28 February 1911 as Budapest, and completed that March. Yard number 617 was launched on 29 March 1911 as Fiume, and completed that April.

Budapest's registered length was 331.0 ft (100.9 m); her beam was 48.3 ft (14.7 m); her depth was 22.2 ft (6.8 m); and her draft was 21 ft 4 1/2 in (6.52 m). Her tonnages were 3,651 GRT and 2,321 NRT. She had a single screw, driven by a three-cylinder triple-expansion engine built by Blair & Co, Ltd of Stockton. It was rated at 296 NHP, or 1,480 ihp, and gave her a speed of 10 knots (19 km/h). "Atlantica" registered her at Fiume. Her code letters were JCQT.

== Internment ==
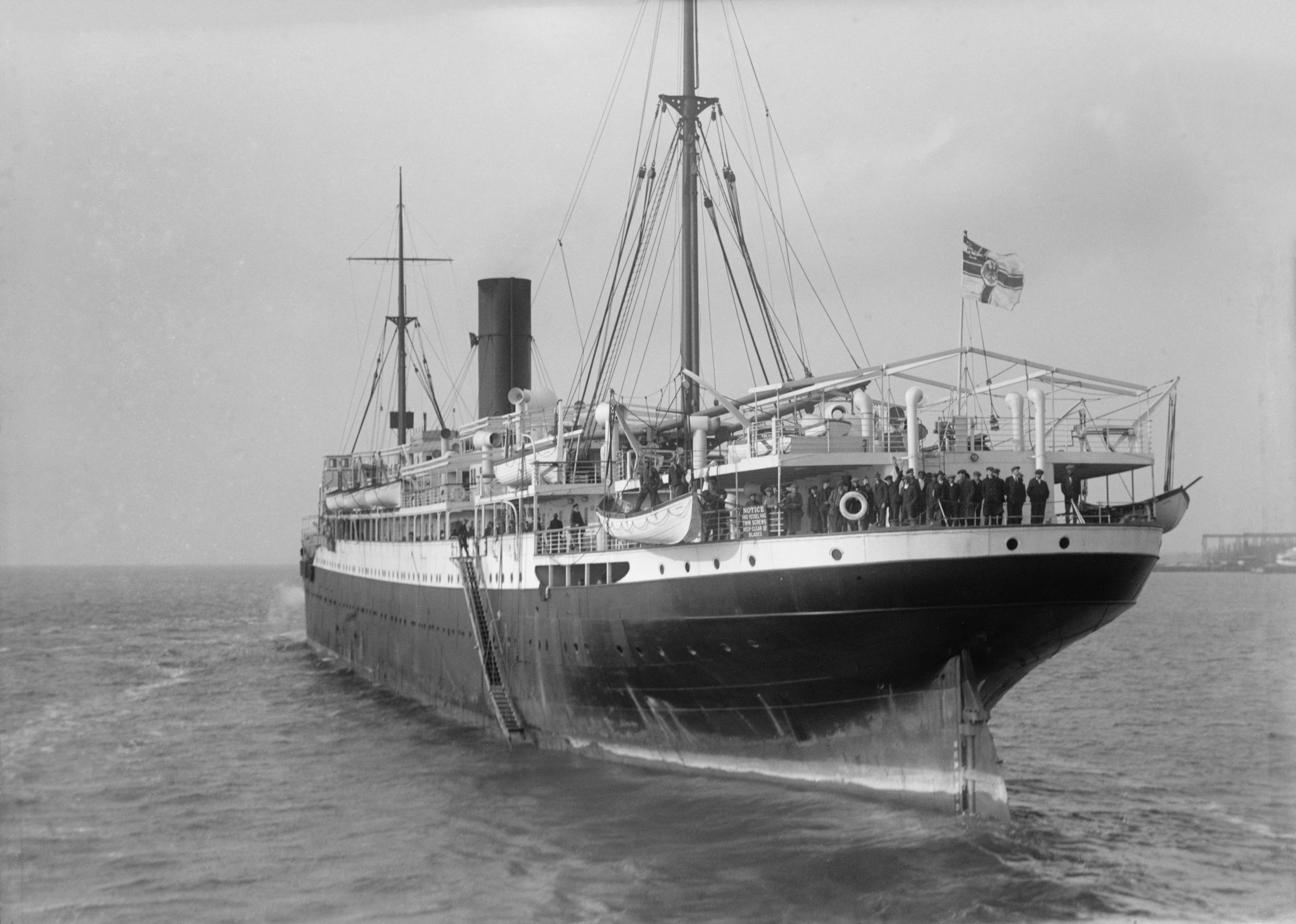
The prize ship Appam in Hampton Roads in 1916

When the First World War began in August 1914, Budapest took refuge in Hampton Roads in Virginia. By April 1915, she was in Newport News, along with the Hamburg America Line cargo ship Arcadia. That August, both Budapest and Arcadia dressed overall to celebrate the 85th birthday of the Habsburg Emperor Franz Joseph I. In February 1916, the two ships were joined in the James River by Appam; a UK passenger liner that the German commerce raider SMS Möwe had captured, and sent to the US as a prize ship. During Budapest's internment, the Second Officer, R Randić, got married, and his bride joined him aboard ship. In about October 1916, she gave birth to a baby.

In February 1917, Norman R. Hamilton, Collector of Customs for the Commonwealth of Virginia, had the US Navy and US Army keep both Arcadia and Budapest under close watch. Guards were placed aboard the two ships, but on 8 February, the Immigration Inspector, WR Morton, removed them, under orders from the Federal Government. However, even after the removal of the guards, the crews of Arcadia and Budapest were not allowed to leave their ships.

== Seizure ==
On 6 April 1917, the US declared war against Germany, but not against Austria-Hungary. The Federal Government immediately seized all German ships in US ports, including Arcadia. The US did not declare war against Austria-Hungary, so the 14 Austro-Hungarian ships in US ports were not seized. As Collector Hamilton led a boarding party aboard Arcadia, and raised the US flag on her poop, Budapest defiantly raised the Austro-Hungarian flag. By April 1917, only a skeleton crew of eight men remained aboard Budapest: her Master, Captain S Kehrer, plus Second Officer Randić, the chief and third engineers, the steward, the donkeyman, and two seamen.

Two days later, Austria-Hungary terminated diplomatic relations with the US, so the US prepared to seize the Austro-Hungarian ships in its ports. Captain Kehrer and his skeleton crew promptly responded by smashing the cylinders of Budapest's engine, and wrecking parts of her machinery.

The torpedo boat USS Bailey

On 10 April, Hamilton sent a boarding party from the torpedo boat USS Bailey, led by a lieutenant, to Budapest. At about 12:30 hrs, the party seized the ship, and took the crew into custody. The Chesapeake and Ohio Railway steamship Virginia took the crew to Norfolk; and Mrs Randić and her six-month-old baby went to stay with a friend in Newport News. Kehrer said that he received orders on 1 January to disable Budapest's machinery. On 12 April, an immigration board ordered that the crews of both Budapest and Arcadia be excluded from the US.

That night, 18 members of the crews of both ships tried to escape from the detention rooms at the immigration station in Norfolk. One of the men lowered a fishing line from one of the barred windows. An accomplice attached this to a large manila rope, the end of which the crewman hauled up to the window. However, a night watchman at a bank opposite the station saw the rope, and telephoned the police. A squad of Norfolk Police Department reserve officers arrived to prevent the escape. Captain Kehrer was transferred to a detention camp in Philadelphia, but by early July had been allowed to return to Newport News, as the US was not at war with Austria-Hungary.

== Kerwood ==
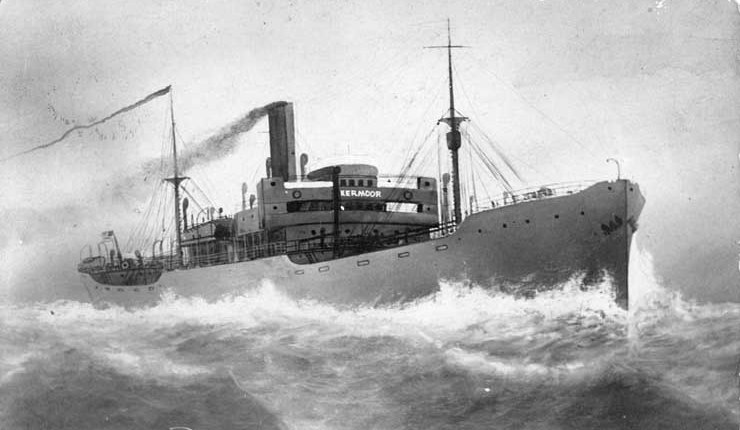
The "Atlantica" cargo ship Morawitz

By 4 July, the Kerr Navigation Corporation had bought Budapest. She was one of eight Austro-Hungarian cargo ships that Kerr bought; with a combined tonnage of almost 57,000 GRT; for a total of $12 million. They included another "Atlantica" ship, Morawitz, which was in Galveston. Kerr renamed its acquisitions, and registered them in New York. Morawitz became Kermoor. Budapest became Kerwood, and was given the US official number 215397, and code letters LHPF. By 15 August, those ships which had been damaged by their crews had been repaired, and Kerr was using them in transatlantic trade.

On 5 November 1918, the US Navy requisitioned Kerwood, with Lieutenant Commander B Ellis as her commanding officer. Her Naval Registry Identification Number was 1489, she was defensively armed with two 3-inch/50-caliber guns, and she was assigned to the Naval Overseas Transportation Service (NOTS). By then, Austria-Hungary had already signed the Armistice of Villa Giusti with the Entente Powers, and a week later, the Germany signed the Armistice of 11 November 1918. However, the American Expeditionary Forces were still in France, so USS Kerwood provided support by shipping Welsh coal from Cardiff to French ports. On 28 December she docked in Bordeaux carrying 1,000 tons of Army stores. She returned to Cardiff, where she left on 29 January 1919 to return to the US. She reached Norfolk, VA on 27 February. On 19 March she was decommissioned, and returned via the United States Shipping Board to her owner.

== Voyages to Hamburg ==
Later in 1919, the American Ship and Commerce Corporation bought Kerwood. On 14 October, she was due to leave New York for Hamburg. On 13 November, she left New York on her next transatlantic crossing to Hamburg. Her Master was a Captain Abernathy, and her crew comprised 36 officers and men. Five of her crew were German seamen, who were working their passage to be repatriated. Much of her cargo was food and clothing, being sent by US residents to relatives in Germany. She also carried 2,114 sacks of mail, destined for Germany, Austria, and Czechoslovakia.

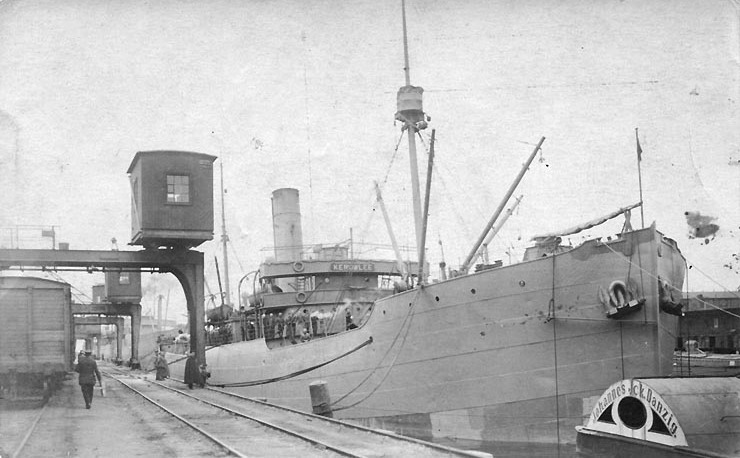
Kerr's Kerowlee in 1919

Kerwood was one of four ships that left the US in November 1919, taking emergency aid to Hamburg, organised by the Central Committee for the Relief of Distress in Germany and Austria. The other ships were Kerr's Keresan and Kerowlee, and the Spanish Mar Rojo. The aid included sweetened condensed milk, creamed coconut, cod liver oil, pasta, gifts of clothing, and items for hospitals. On 30 November, Kerwood passed Dungeness in the English Channel. On 1 December, she struck a mine in the North Sea off the Dutch Frisian island of Terschelling. She broadcast a wireless distress signal, and a salvage tug was sent to assist her. According to one report, the tug failed to find her; but according to another, it succeeded. She sank at position 53°31′57″N 04°44′20″E, but all of her crew were rescued. 25 of them were repatriated aboard the USSB cargo ship Edellyn, which reached New York on 1 January 1920.

== Bibliography ==
- Bureau of Navigation (1918). Fiftieth Annual List of Merchant Vessels of the United States (PDF). Washington, DC: United States Department of Commerce and Labor – via HyperWar.
- Bureau of Navigation (1919). Fifty-First Annual List of Merchant Vessels of the United States (PDF). Washington, DC: United States Department of Commerce and Labor – via HyperWar.
- Lloyd's Register of British and Foreign Shipping. Vol. II.–Steamers. London: Lloyd's Register of Shipping. 1911 – via Internet Archive.
- Lloyd's Register of Shipping. Vol. II.–Steamers. London: Lloyd's Register of Shipping. 1919 – via Internet Archive.
