= Naval Registry Identification Number =

Unique Naval identification number

A Naval Registry Identification Number is a unique identifier that the U.S. Navy used for privately owned and naval vessels in the first half of the 20th century.

== Overview ==
During World War I, in 1916, the U.S. Navy began a registry of privately owned pleasure craft and yachts that were available for patrol service in the event the United States was drawn into the conflict. "Section Patrol" ("SP") numbers were assigned in a series beginning with SP-1 and ultimately extending to well over 4,000. As the registration process continued, other types of ships and craft were included for which the "Section Patrol" designation was clearly inappropriate, and these were generally given "Identification" ("ID") numbers in the same series as the "SP"s. In addition, some vessels that were numbered with an "SP" prefix before 1918 later had that prefix changed to "ID". The registry, and the SP/ID number series, was continued at least into the early 1920s, with new numbers being assigned to ships completed or examined after the end of World War I. The latter category included some ships that served in the Navy, without numbers, during 1917–1919.

Strictly speaking, these SP/ID registry numbers were not U.S. Navy "hull numbers", which would not be formally adopted until mid-1920. Many of the ships and craft so numbered had no Navy service, while others that were acquired and employed by the Navy received no numbers. However, like hull numbers, the SP/ID numbers were used for record-keeping purposes and were often painted on the exterior of vessels (especially patrol types) to facilitate identification.

== See also ==
- Hull classification symbol
