= United American Lines =

Defunct American shipping company

United American Lines, the common name of the American Shipping and Commercial Corporation, was a shipping company founded by W. Averell Harriman in 1920. Intended as a way for Harriman to make his mark in the business world outside of his father, railroad magnate E. H. Harriman, the company was financed by the younger Harriman's mother, Mary Williamson Harriman. Entering into the shipping world with little experience, Harriman's United American Lines entered into agreements with Hamburg America Line (German: Hamburg Amerikanische Packetfahrt Actien Gesellschaft or HAPAG), which was determined to recover after the financial disaster that befell the German company as a result of World War I.

After the brief and unsuccessful attempt at transatlantic service by the United States Mail Steamship Company (U.S. Mail Line) ended, Harriman's United American Line was temporarily assigned control over the former U.S. Mail Line ships in 1921.

His inexperience taken advantage of by HAPAG and the almost complete end of immigration to the United States drained millions of dollars from the company and led Harriman to sell the company to HAPAG in 1926.

== Passenger fleet ==
- Cleveland
- Mount Carroll
- Mount Clay
- Mount Clinton
- Reliance
- Resolute
