= September 1941 =

Month of 1941

<<	September 1941					>>
Su	Mo	Tu	We	Th	Fr	Sa
	1	2	3	4	5	6
7	8	9	10	11	12	13
14	15	16	17	18	19	20
21	22	23	24	25	26	27
28	29	30

The following events occurred in September 1941:

== September 1, 1941 (Monday) ==
- The Germans recaptured Mga from the Soviets.
- German forces came within artillery range of Leningrad.
- A Nazi regulation announced that starting September 19, all Jews of the Reich would be required to wear the yellow Star of David badge.
- U.S. President Franklin D. Roosevelt gave a Labor Day radio address to the American people. "American labor now bears a tremendous responsibility in the winning of this most brutal, most terrible of all wars," the president said. "In our factories and shops and arsenals we are building weapons on a scale great in its magnitude. To all the battle fronts of this world these weapons are being dispatched, by day and by night, over the seas and through the air. And this Nation is now devising and developing new weapons of unprecedented power toward the maintenance of democracy ... Our vast effort, and the unity of purpose that inspires that effort, are due solely to our recognition of the fact that our fundamental rights - including the rights of labor — are threatened by Hitler's violent attempt to rule the world."
- KYW-TV, the first American television station outside New York, went on the air in Philadelphia, Pennsylvania.
- Born: George Saimes, American football player, in Canton, Ohio (d. 2013)
- Died: Karl Parts, 55, Estonian military commander (executed by the Soviets)

== September 2, 1941 (Tuesday) ==
- The Royal Air Force began daylight bombing of targets in northern France.
- Ponary massacre: German police and local auxiliaries massacred more than 3,700 Jews at Ponary near Vilnius.
- Born: David Bale, entrepreneur and activist, in South Africa (d. 2003); Jyrki Otila, quiz show judge and member of the European Parliament, in Helsinki, Finland (d. 2003); Sadhana Shivdasani, actress, in Karachi, British India (d. 2015); John Thompson, basketball player and coach, in Washington, D.C. (d. 2020)

== September 3, 1941 (Wednesday) ==
- German heavy artillery began shelling Leningrad.
- Operation Gauntlet ended in Allied success.
- Zyklon B was used experimentally at Auschwitz concentration camp, gassing 600 Soviet prisoners of war and 250 sick Polish prisoners. The experiment was deemed a success.
- German submarine U-702 was commissioned.
- Born: Sergei Dovlatov, journalist and writer, in Ufa, USSR (d. 1990)

== September 4, 1941 (Thursday) ==
- The Greer incident occurred in the North Atlantic when the German submarine U-652 fired a torpedo at the American destroyer USS Greer, perhaps believing that the American ship had launched an attack that had actually come from a British bomber.
- The Finnish conquest of East Karelia began.
- The New York Yankees clinched their fifth American League pennant in six seasons with a 6–3 win over the Boston Red Sox. This was the earliest major league clinching date ever for a 154-game season.
- German submarines U-156 and U-586 were commissioned.
- Born: Ken Harrelson, baseball player and broadcaster, in Woodruff, South Carolina; Sushilkumar Shinde, politician, in Solapur, British India

== September 5, 1941 (Friday) ==
- The Finnish reconquest of the Karelian Isthmus was completed.
- The Pavoloch massacre occurred when the Einsatzgruppen shot 1,500 Jews in the Ukrainian shtetl of Pavoloch.
- The film Citizen Kane, directed by and starring Orson Welles, was released in the US.
- Died: George Marchant, 83, Australian soft drink manufacturer and philanthropist

== September 6, 1941 (Saturday) ==
- The Battle of Changsha began as part of the Second Sino-Japanese War.
- During the Yelnya Offensive, the Soviets retook Yelnya itself.
- Hitler issued Directive No. 35, Moscow Offensive. Army Group Centre was instructed to prepare for a drive on Moscow at the end of September.
- The German training ship Bremse was rammed and sunk with the loss of over half the crew off the coast of Norway by the British cruiser HMS Nigeria.
- The Vilna Ghetto was established.

== September 7, 1941 (Sunday) ==
- The German 6th Army broke through Soviet defenses near Konotop.
- German XIII, XLIII and XXXV Army Corps captured Chernihiv.
- 360 refugees disembarked the Spanish freighter Navemar at Havana. Four died in the overcrowded conditions during the voyage across the Atlantic.
- The results of a Gallup poll were published asking Americans, "Should the United States take steps now to keep Japan from becoming more powerful, even if it means risking a war with Japan?" 70% said yes, 18% said no and 12% expressed no opinion.
- Died: Sara Roosevelt, 86, mother of U.S. President Franklin D. Roosevelt

== September 8, 1941 (Monday) ==
- The Yelnya Offensive ended in Soviet victory.
- The Siege of Leningrad began.
- The Germans captured Kremenchuk.
- Hungarian Regent Miklós Horthy began a three-day visit to Hitler at his Wolf's Lair.
- Born: Bernie Sanders, politician, in Brooklyn, New York

== September 9, 1941 (Tuesday) ==
- Allied convoy SC 42 was sighted near Cape Farewell, Greenland by the German submarine U-85. Over the next three nights a total of 16 ships from the convoy were sunk by a German Wolfpack.
- Iran agreed to the terms of the occupying Allied forces. All Axis-aligned consulates would be closed and German nationals would be turned over to the British or Russians. The Allies would control Iranian roads, airports and communication.
- Congressional hearings opened in Washington investigating allegations of propaganda in American films. North Dakota Senator Gerald Nye set the tone of the hearings on the first day by suggesting that propaganda was being injected into films by a cabal of foreign-born Jews who owned or operated the major movie studios.
- German submarine U-162 was commissioned.
- Born: Otis Redding, soul singer, in Dawson, Georgia (d. 1967); Dennis Ritchie, computer scientist, in Bronxville, New York (d. 2011)
- Died: Hans Spemann, 72, German embryologist

== September 10, 1941 (Wednesday) ==
- 3rd Panzer Division reached Romny.
- In Nazi-occupied Norway, martial law was declared and trade union officials were arrested in order to prevent a trade union plan for a general strike.
- German submarine U-501 was depth charged and sunk in the Denmark Strait by the Canadian corvette HMCS Chambly.
- The Van–Erciş earthquake in eastern Turkey killed 192 people.
- German submarine U-168 was commissioned.
- Born: Christopher Hogwood, conductor and harpsichordist, in Nottingham, England (d. 2014); Gunpei Yokoi, video game designer, in Kyoto, Japan (d. 1997)

== September 11, 1941 (Thursday) ==
- Joseph Stalin fired Semyon Budyonny as Commander-in-Chief of the Southwest Direction and replaced him with Semyon Timoshenko.
- Charles Lindbergh made a speech on behalf of the America First Committee in Des Moines, Iowa which included remarks that would be instantly controversial: "The three most important groups who have been pressing this country toward war are the British, the Jewish and the Roosevelt administration." Lindbergh said he admired the British and Jewish races, but claimed that the Jews' "greatest danger to this country lies in their large ownership and influence in our motion pictures, our press, our radio and our government."
- The German submarine U-207 was sunk in the Denmark Strait by depth charges from the British destroyers Leamington and Veteran.
- German submarine U-587 was commissioned.
- President Roosevelt gave a fireside chat on maintaining freedom of the seas and the Greer incident, an incident that led President Franklin D. Roosevelt to issue what became known as his "shoot-on-sight" order. Roosevelt publicly confirmed the "shoot on sight" order on 11 September 1941, effectively declaring naval war against Germany and Italy in the Battle of the Atlantic, 3 months prior to Pearl Harbor.
- Died: Alipio Ponce, 35, Peruvian police officer, was killed in an ambush in the Ecuadorian–Peruvian War.

== September 12, 1941 (Friday) ==
- An authorized Nazi spokesperson said that President Roosevelt "wants war" and that Germany would take "appropriate measures". That same day, an editorial by the prominent Italian journalist and unofficial Axis spokesman Virginio Gayda was published in the Giornale d'Italia, in which he declared that the "act of unprovoked aggression" by Roosevelt had left the Axis warships no alternative "but to attack United States naval ships on sight."
- White House Press Secretary Stephen Early said there was "striking similarity" between Nazi propaganda and Charles Lindbergh's comments in Des Moines. Lindbergh's remarks were widely criticized in the American press, even among pro-isolationist newspapers such as the Chicago Tribune and the Hearst media empire. The public standing of the America First Committee was severely damaged as a result.
- The collaborationist Norwegian government of Vidkun Quisling banned the Boy Scouts. Boys were now required to join the youth leagues of the Nasjonal Samling.
- The Spanish freighter Navemar arrived in New York with 787 refugees.
- Died: Eugen Ritter von Schobert, 58, German general (plane crash on the Eastern Front)

== September 13, 1941 (Saturday) ==
- Georgy Zhukov arrived in Leningrad to replace Kliment Voroshilov as the commanding officer of the city's garrison.
- XXIV Panzer Corps took Lokhvytsia.
- Norwegian passenger ship Barøy was sunk in the Vestfjord by a Fairey Albacore of 817 Squadron, Royal Australian Navy.
- Born: Tadao Ando, architect, in Minato-ku, Osaka, Japan

== September 14, 1941 (Sunday) ==
- 3rd and 16th Panzer Divisions linked up at Lokhvitsa, completing the encirclement of Kiev.
- The U.S. Navy provided escorts for British convoy Hx 150, the first time that the Americans took a direct part in the North Atlantic campaign.
- The unfinished Soviet cruiser Petropavlovsk (formerly the German cruiser Lützow) was sunk at Leningrad by German artillery.
- Born: Alberto Naranjo, musician, in Caracas, Venezuela (d. 2020)

== September 15, 1941 (Monday) ==
- Hitler re-activated the rocket program at Peenemünde Army Research Center.
- The British passenger ship Empire Eland was torpedoed and sunk in the Atlantic Ocean by German submarine U-94.
- The Orson Welles Show premiered on CBS Radio.
- German submarines U-157 and U-506 were commissioned.
- Born: Mirosław Hermaszewski, cosmonaut, in Lipniki, Reichskommissariat Ukraine (d. 2022)
- Died: Alanson B. Houghton, 77, American businessman, politician and diplomat

== September 16, 1941 (Tuesday) ==
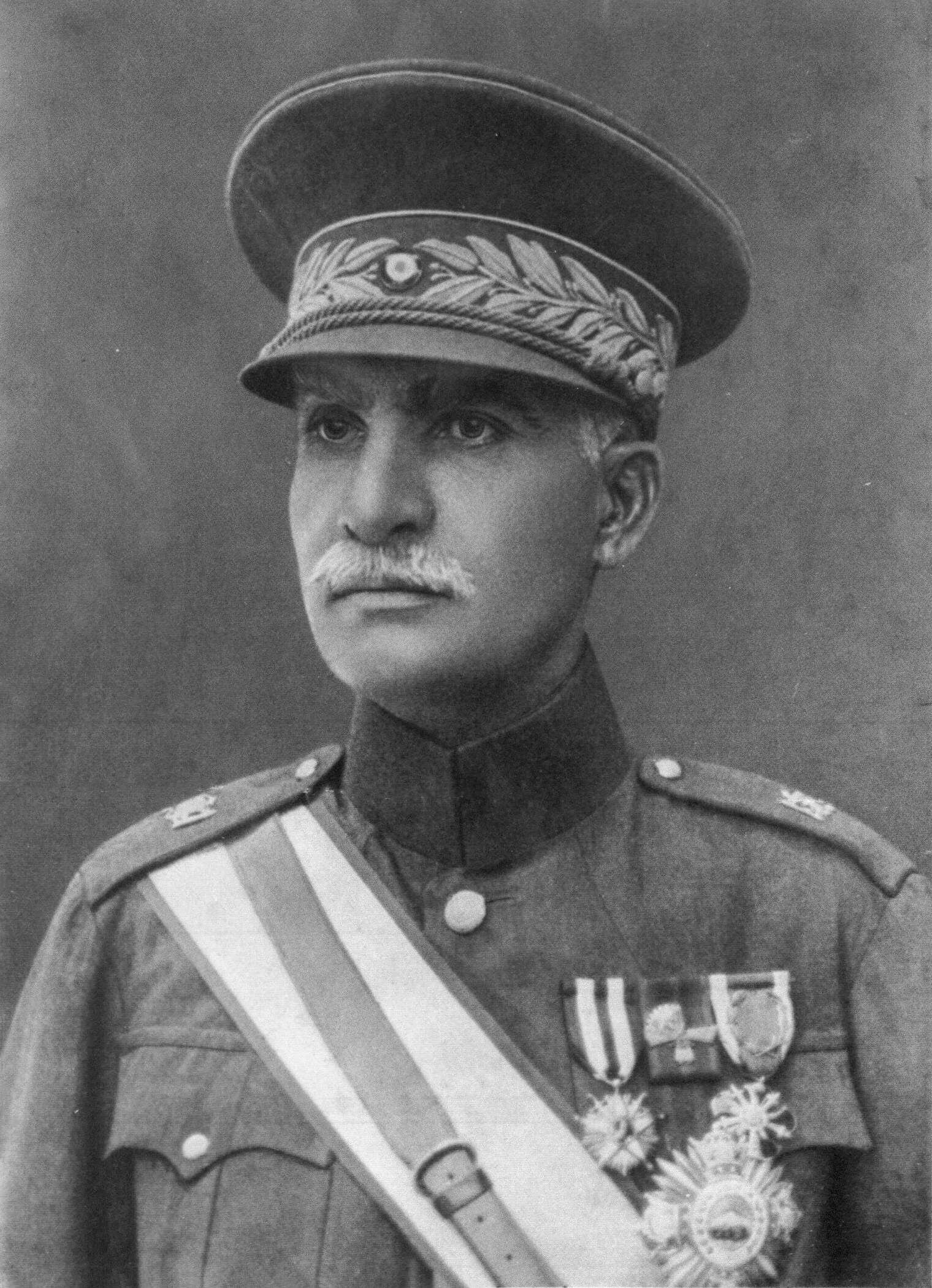
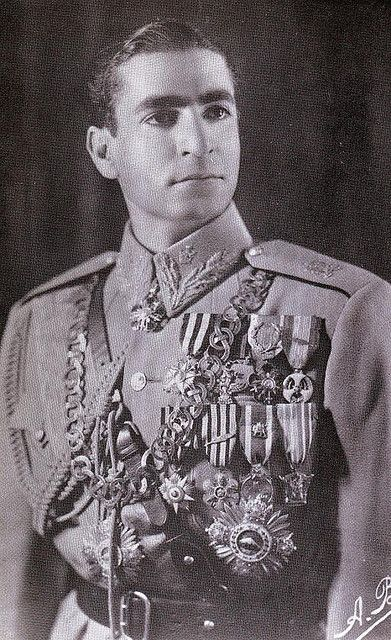
September 16, 1941: Iran's ruler Reza Shah abdicates and replaced by his son, Mohammad Reza
- Reza Shah abdicated under pressure as Shah of Iran in favour of his son Mohammad Reza Pahlavi. "I have spent all my power and energy in the service of the country," his abdication letter read. "I am no longer able to continue in the same vein. I feel the time has come for a younger and more energetic power to take charge of the affairs of the nation, which require constant attention, and to work for the happiness and welfare of the people. Therefore, I resign, bequeathing the crown to my heir and crown prince."
- Iran broke diplomatic relations with Bulgaria, Hungary, Italy and Romania.
- XLI Panzer Corps occupied Strelna, cutting off the Soviet 8th Army from Leningrad.
- Nazi authorities decreed that for every German soldier killed in occupied territories, 50 to 100 communists were to be shot.

== September 17, 1941 (Wednesday) ==
- The Anglo-Soviet invasion of Iran concluded. Great Britain and the Soviet Union set up a joint occupation of the country.
- Erich von Manstein took command of the German 11th Army following the death of Eugen Ritter von Schobert.
- Listening to foreign radio in the German Reich became punishable by death.
- The British government ordered potatoes to be sold at 1d so people would eat more of them.
- German submarine U-405 was commissioned.
- Born: Bob Matsui, politician, in Sacramento, California (d. 2005)

== September 18, 1941 (Thursday) ==
- The Soviet Union announced conscription for all males aged 16–50.
- The Soviet river monitor Vitebsk was scuttled near Kiev to avoid capture by the Germans.
- German submarine U-588 was commissioned.
- The drama film Lydia starring Merle Oberon was released.
- Died: Fred Karno, 75, English theatre impresario

== September 19, 1941 (Friday) ==
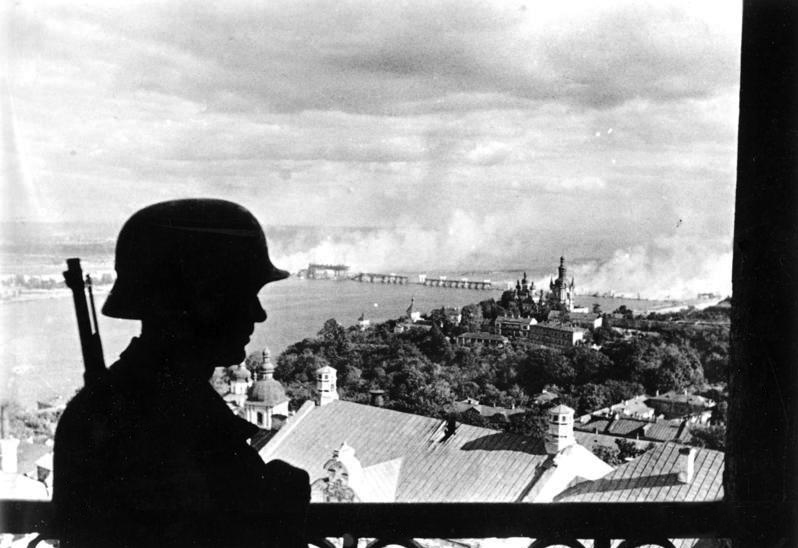
Kiev falls into German hands

- The Germans captured Kiev and took 500,000 Red Army soldiers prisoner.
- Over 1,000 civilians were killed in a German air-raid on Leningrad.
- Draža Mihailović and Josip Broz Tito met at Struganik in an attempt to reach an agreement to co-operate. The talks went well enough but no real agreement was reached due to the different concepts of resistance between the two groups.
- The Canadian corvette HMCS Lévis was torpedoed and damaged off Cape Farewell, Greenland by German submarine U-74. Corvette Mayflower began to tow the ship but the Lévis capsized and sank later that day.
- The Bulgarian cargo ship Rodina struck a naval mine in the Black Sea and sank.
- The comic book superhero Green Arrow made his first appearance in More Fun Comics issue #73 (cover date November).
- Sunspots caused a major geomagnetic storm, knocking out radio equipment and telegraph lines.
- Born: Cass Elliot, singer and member of The Mamas & the Papas, in Baltimore, Maryland (d. 1974)

== September 20, 1941 (Saturday) ==
- Allied convoy SC 44 was attacked in the North Atlantic by Wolfpack Brandenburg. The CAM ship SS Empire Burton was sunk by U-74 and the cargo ship Pink Star (flying under the Panamanian flag) and tanker T.J. Williams were sunk by U-552.
- Martial law was declared in Bulgaria.
- The British ferry Portsdown struck a mine and sank in the Celtic Sea with the loss of 23 lives.
- German submarine U-251 was commissioned.
- Born: Dale Chihuly, glass sculptor, in Tacoma, Washington
- Died: Mikhail Kirponos, 49, Soviet Ukrainian general, Commander of the Southwestern Front

== September 21, 1941 (Sunday) ==
- 180 bombers of the Luftwaffe struck the Soviet naval base at Kronstadt and destroyed much of the dockyard.
- The Mediterranean U-boat Campaign began when U-371 passed Gibraltar.
- Born: Jack Brisco, professional wrestler, in Seminole, Oklahoma (d. 2010)

== September 22, 1941 (Monday) ==
- Hitler issued Directive No. 36, Instructions for Winter operations in Norway.
- King George II of Greece arrived in exile in England from Egypt with members of his family and government.
- "Russian Tank Week" began in the United Kingdom. From this day through September 26, all armored vehicles produced in Britain were to be delivered to the Soviets.
- Eleanor Roosevelt, the First Lady of the United States, was appointed assistant director of the Office of Civilian Defense.
- Born: Ernest Green, one of the Little Rock Nine, in Little Rock, Arkansas

== September 23, 1941 (Tuesday) ==
- German Stukas attacked Kronstadt again and sank the anchored battleship Marat, marking the first time in history that a battleship was sunk by dive bombers.
- German submarine U-118 was commissioned.
- US battleship USS Massachusetts BB-59 was launched.

== September 24, 1941 (Wednesday) ==
- The Inter-Allied Council met in St James's Palace. Representatives of the Soviet Union and Free France as well the governments-in-exile of Belgium, Czechoslovakia, Greece, Luxembourg, the Netherlands, Norway, Poland and Yugoslavia unanimously affirmed the common principles of policy set forth in the Atlantic Charter.
- 70,000 Yugoslav Partisans captured Užice and made it the capital of the mini-state known as the Republic of Užice.
- On the defensive since Lindbergh's remarks in Des Moines, the America First Committee issued a statement denying that Lindbergh or his fellow AFC members were anti-Semitic and invited Jews to join the organization's ranks.
- Born: Guy Hovis, singer, in Tupelo, Mississippi; Linda McCartney, née Eastman, musician, photographer and animal rights activist, in Scarsdale, New York (d. 1998)
- Died: Gottfried Feder, 58, German economist and early member of the Nazi Party

== September 25, 1941 (Thursday) ==
- The Japanese aircraft carrier Zuikaku was commissioned.
- German submarines U-158 and U-589 were commissioned.
- Convoy HG 73 came under attack in the North Atlantic. The British liner SS Avoceta was torpedoed and sunk by the German submarine U-203.
- The Brooklyn Dodgers clinched the National League pennant with a 6–0 win over the Boston Braves.
- The war film A Yank in the R.A.F. starring Tyrone Power and Betty Grable had its world premiere at Grauman's Chinese Theatre in Hollywood.
- Died: Clifford Grey, 54, English songwriter, librettist and actor; Hall Roosevelt, 50, American engineer, banker and soldier, brother of Eleanor Roosevelt

== September 26, 1941 (Friday) ==
- The First Battle of Kiev ended in German victory.
- 1,608 Jews in Kaunas were loaded into trucks, driven to the outskirts of the city and killed.
- The British cargo ship Avoceta from convoy HG 73 was torpedoed and sunk north of the Azores by German submarine U-203.
- The Congressional hearings on allegations of propaganda in American films adjourned with the intention to resume in January 1942. The media was almost universally critical of the attacks made on the film industry during the hearings, as the isolationist Senators who initiated the proceedings came across as anti-Semitic and more paranoid about Hollywood than any threat from Hitler.
- Born: Martine Beswick, actress and model, in Port Antonio, Jamaica

== September 27, 1941 (Saturday) ==
- Georges Catroux, the Chief of Free French forces in the Levant, declared the independence of the Syrian Republic.
- The Germans launched Operation Uzice, directed against the Republic of Užice.
- In the Crimean Campaign, the German 11th Army captured Perekop.
- 3,446 Jews in Eišiškės were taken to pits dug in the town's Jewish cemetery and machine-gunned into them.
- The Italian torpedo boat Albatros was sunk off Messina, Sicily by the British submarine HMS Upright.
- Reinhard Heydrich was appointed Deputy Reich Protector of the Protectorate of Bohemia and Moravia.
- British Commandos executed Operation Chopper, an overnight raid on Saint-Aubin-d'Arquenay in occupied France.
- German submarine U-436 was commissioned.
- Melbourne defeated Essendon by 29 points in the VFL Grand Final.
- "Blue Champagne" by Jimmy Dorsey and His Orchestra hit No. 1 on the Billboard singles charts.
- Born: Gay Kayler, country music singer, in Gatton, Queensland, Australia; Sam Zell, business magnate, in Chicago, Illinois (d. 2023); Dicky Suprapto, Indonesian actor and film producer, husband of Indonesian 1st president Sukarno's daughter, Rachmawati Soekarnoputri. (d. 2006)

== September 28, 1941 (Sunday) ==
- The Drama Uprising began in Axis-occupied Greece.
- The Operation Halberd convoy reached Malta with 50,000 tons of urgently needed supplies.
- The first British convoy of supplies for the Soviet Union departed Iceland for Arkhangelsk.
- Ted Williams of the Boston Red Sox entered the final day of the baseball season batting .3995535, which would have been rounded up to .400 in the official statistics. Williams believed he didn't deserve to hit .400 if he couldn't do it from the beginning of the season to the end, so he played in the doubleheader at Shibe Park against the Philadelphia Athletics, telling a reporter that "I either make it or I don't." Williams went 4-for-5 in the first game and 2-for-3 in the second game to finish the season with a batting average of .4057, or rounded up, .406. No one has ever hit .400 in the major leagues since.
- Born: Edmund Stoiber, politician, in Oberaudorf, Germany

== September 29, 1941 (Monday) ==
- The Moscow Conference began with representatives of Britain, the United States and the Soviet Union meeting for the first time in the war.
- Special SS squads began massacring thousands of Jews at Babi Yar ravine outside Kiev.
- The Drama Uprising was suppressed.
- Reinhard Heydrich arranged for the arrest of the Protectorate of Bohemia and Moravia Prime Minister Alois Eliáš.
- In a statement to The Globe and Mail, Commander Andrew McNaughton called the Canadian Corps "a dagger pointed at the heart of Berlin," a phrase that made for great copy in the press back home while Canadian forces continued waiting to see front line action.
- Joe Louis beat Lou Nova by technical knockout in the sixth round at the Polo Grounds in New York City to retain the world heavyweight boxing title.
- Born: Fred West, serial killer, in Much Marcle, Herefordshire, England (d. 1995)
- Died: Herbert Samuel Holt, 85, Irish-born Canadian civil engineer and businessman

== September 30, 1941 (Tuesday) ==
- The Germans launched Operation Typhoon, the assault on Moscow, when Heinz Guderian's forces attacked along the Bryansk Front.
- The two-day Babi Yar massacre ended with almost 34,000 Ukrainian Jews killed and covered over with dirt and rock.
- Winston Churchill gave a speech in the House of Commons reviewing the war situation.
- The Soviet cruiser Aurora was sunk in Oranienbaum harbour.
- Born: Angela Pleasence, actress, in Chapeltown, South Yorkshire, England
