= HMCS Agassiz =

Flower-class corvette

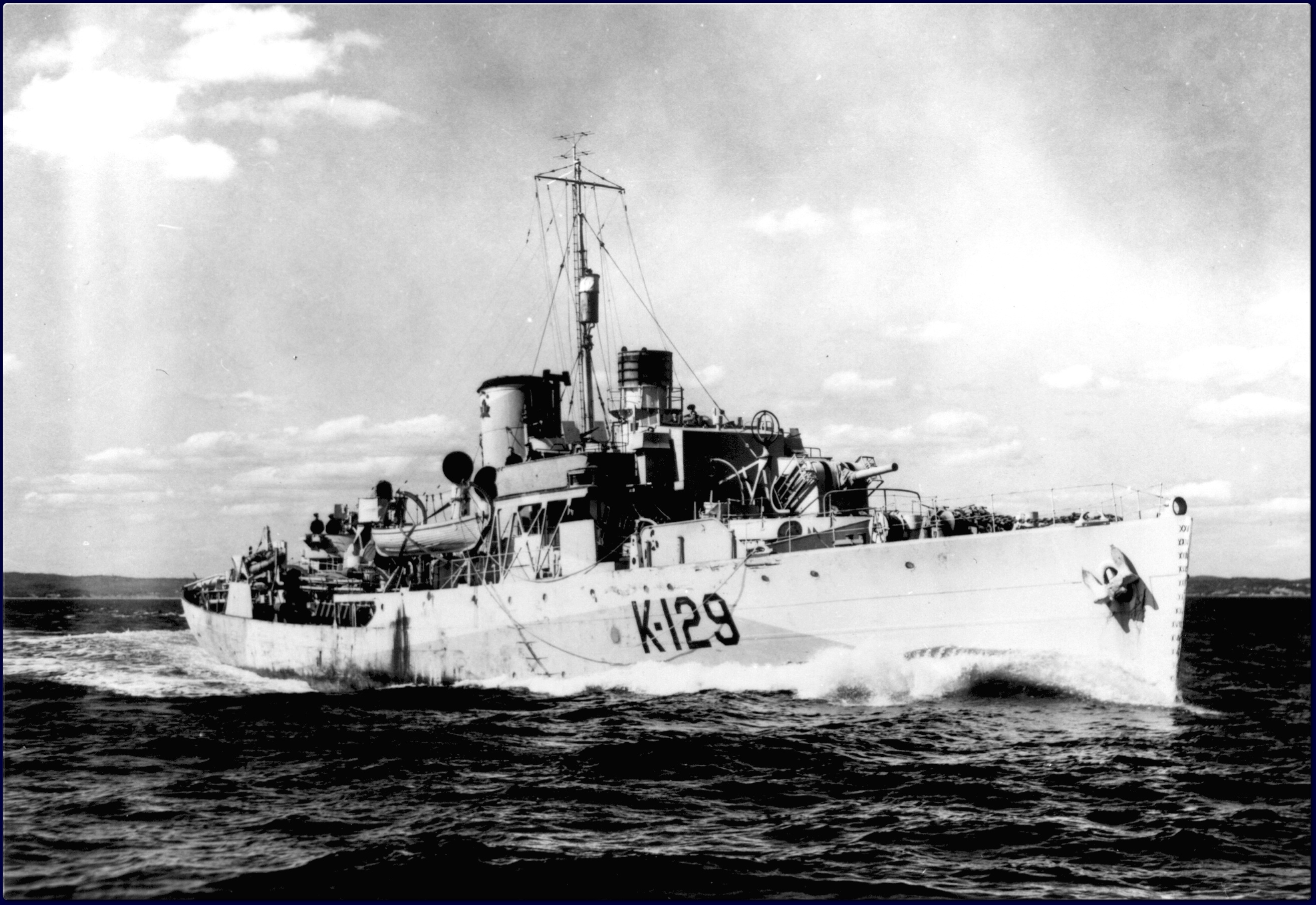
- HMCS Agassiz, taken sometime in 1944 or 1945.

History

Canada
- Name: Agassiz
- Namesake: Agassiz, British Columbia
- Ordered: January 1940
- Builder: Burrard Dry Dock Co. Ltd., North Vancouver
- Laid down: 29 April 1940
- Launched: 15 August 1940
- Commissioned: 23 January 1941
- Decommissioned: 14 June 1945
- Identification: Pennant number: K129
- Honours and awards: Atlantic 1941–45; Gulf of St. Lawrence 1944
- Fate: Sold in 1945 for scrapping

General characteristics
- Class & type: Flower-class corvette (original)
- Displacement: 950 long tons (970 t)
- Length: 205 ft 1 in (62.51 m) o/a
- Beam: 33 ft 1 in (10.08 m)
- Draught: 13 ft 5 in (4.09 m)
- Propulsion: single shaft; 2 × Scotch boilers; 1 × 4-cylinder triple-expansion reciprocating steam engine; 2,750 ihp (2,050 kW)
- Speed: 16 knots (30 km/h; 18 mph)
- Range: 3,450 nmi (6,390 km; 3,970 mi) at 12 kn (22 km/h; 14 mph)
- Complement: 47
- Sensors & processing systems: 1 × SW1C or 2C radar; 1 × Type 123A or Type 127DV sonar
- Armament: 1 × BL 4-inch (101.6 mm) Mk.IX single gun; 2 × .50 cal machine gun (twin); 2 × Lewis .303 cal machine gun (twin); 2 × Mk.II depth charge throwers; 2 × depth charge rails with 40 depth charges; originally fitted with minesweeping gear, later removed

HMCS Agassiz was a Flower-class corvette of the Royal Canadian Navy. Named after the community of Agassiz, British Columbia, the ship was constructed by Burrard Dry Dock Co. Ltd. in North Vancouver, British Columbia and was launched on 15 August 1940. The corvette was commissioned on 23 January 1941 in Vancouver, British Columbia. The Flower class were initially designed for coastal service during the Second World War, but due to the demands of the Battle of the Atlantic, Agassiz was used primarily as an ocean escort for convoys crossing the Atlantic Ocean in engagements with German submarines. Following the war, the corvette was sold for scrap.

== Design and description ==
Flower-class corvettes like Agassiz serving with the Royal Canadian Navy during the Second World War were different from earlier and more traditional sail-driven corvettes. The Flower-class corvettes originated from a need that arose in 1938 to expand the Royal Navy following the Munich Crisis. A design request went out for a small escort for coastal convoys. Based on a traditional whaler-type design, the initial Canadian ships of the Flower class had a standard displacement of 950 long tons (970 t). They were 205 feet 1 inch (62.51 m) long overall with a beam of 33 feet 1 inch (10.08 m) and a maximum draught of 13 feet 5 inches (4.09 m). The initial 1939–1940 corvettes were powered by a four-cylinder vertical triple expansion engine powered by steam from two Scotch boilers turning one three-bladed propeller rated at 2,800 indicated horsepower (2,100 kW). The Scotch boilers were replaced with water-tube boilers in later 1939–1940 and 1940–1941 Programme ships. The corvettes had a maximum speed of 16 knots (30 km/h; 18 mph). This gave them a range of 3,450 nautical miles (6,390 km; 3,970 mi) at 12 knots (22 km/h; 14 mph). The vessels were extremely wet.

The Canadian Flower-class vessels were initially armed with a Mk IX BL 4-inch (102 mm) gun forward on a CP 1 mounting and carried 100 rounds per gun. The corvettes were also armed with a QF Vickers 2-pounder (40 mm, 1.6 in) gun on a bandstand aft, two single-mounted .303 Vickers machine guns or Browning 0.5-calibre machine guns for anti-aircraft defence and two twin-mounted .303 Lewis machine guns, usually sited on bridge wings. For anti-submarine warfare, they mounted two depth charge throwers and initially carried 25 depth charges. The corvettes were designed with a Type 123 ASDIC sonar set installed. The Flower-class ships had a complement of 47 officers and ratings. The Royal Canadian Navy initially ordered 54 corvettes in 1940 and these were fitted with Mark II Oropesa minesweeping gear used for destroying contact mines. Part of the depth charge rails were made portable so the minesweeping gear could be utilised.

=== Modifications ===
In Canadian service the vessels were altered due to experience with the design's deficiencies. The galley was moved further back in the ship and the mess and sleeping quarters combined. A direction-finding set was installed and enlarged bilge keels were installed to reduce rolling. After the first 35–40 corvettes had been constructed, the foremast was shifted aft of the bridge and the mainmast was eliminated. Corvettes were first fitted with basic SW-1 and SW-2 CQ surface warning radar, notable for their fishbone-like antenna and reputation for failure in poor weather or in the dark. The compass house was moved further aft and the open-type bridge was situated in front of it. The ASDIC hut was moved in front and to a lower position on the bridge. The improved Type 271 radar was placed aft, with some units receiving Type 291 radar for air search. The minesweeping gear, a feature of the first 54 corvettes, was removed. Most Canadian Flower-class corvettes had their forecastles extended which improved crew accommodation and seakeeping. Furthermore, the sheer and flare of the bow was increased, which led to an enlarged bridge. This allowed for the installation of Oerlikon 20 mm (0.8 in) cannon, replacing the Browning and Vickers machine guns. Some of the corvettes were rearmed with Hedgehog anti-submarine mortars. The complements of the ships grew throughout the war rising from the initial 47 to as many as 104.

== Construction and career ==
The vessel was ordered as part of the 1939–1940 Programme in January 1940, and laid down on 29 April 1940 by Burrard Dry Dock Co. Ltd. in North Vancouver, British Columbia. Corvettes commissioned by the Royal Canadian Navy during the Second World War were not named after flowers, as the class name might suggest, but after communities for the most part, to better represent the people who took part in building them. This idea was put forth by Admiral Percy W. Nelles. Sponsors were commonly associated with the community for which the ship was named. Agassiz, named for the town in British Columbia, was launched on 15 August 1940 and commissioned on 23 January 1941 in Vancouver, British Columbia with the pennant number K129.

After completion Agassiz was sent to Halifax, Nova Scotia, with sister ships HMCS Wetaskiwin and HMCS Alberni via the Panama Canal arriving on 13 April 1941. In May 1941 she was assigned to the Newfoundland Escort Force. She served continuously as an ocean escort until the end of 1943. In August 1941, Agassiz was part of the escort 57-ship HX 143 convoy, which was guided around a German U-boat concentration in the North Atlantic. On 1 September 1941, the escort groups were reformed and Agassiz joined Escort Group 19.

On 18 September 1941, the German submarine U-74 sighted the convoy SC 44 in the North Atlantic. The convoy was guarded by the destroyer HMS Chesterfield and the corvettes Agassiz, HMCS Mayflower, HMCS Lévis and HMS Honeysuckle. Only four U-boats moved to engage and during the first night of battle, Lévis was sunk. Agassiz recovered her survivors. Four merchant vessels were sunk as well on 18/19 September. In response to the sinkings, the convoy protection was enhanced with the arrival of three more corvettes.

Agassiz participated in the battle for convoy ON 102 with Mid-Ocean Escort Force (MOEF) group A3 in July 1942. She also fought the battles for convoy SC 97 with MOEF group C2 and the battles for convoy ON 115 and convoy SC 109 with MOEF group C3. During the battle for ON 115, Agassiz opened fire on a surfaced U-boat, then aided in the recovery of the crew of the sunken RMS Lochkatrine. The corvette then took the tanker G. S. Waldron under tow after the ship had been torpedoed and crippled and brought it to safety. The crew received salvage money for the effort. In August 1942, Agassiz was re-assigned to the Caribbean Sea, escorting convoys of oil tankers between Caribbean ports. The corvette was part of the escort of the convoy TAW 12, travelling between Trinidad, Aruba and Key West that lost several ships.

The ship's first major refit took place at Liverpool, Nova Scotia from early January 1943 until mid-March. Following her workups after her first major refit in early 1943, Agassiz was assigned to MOEF group C1 and escorted 12 trans-Atlantic convoys without loss before another major yard overhaul. The second took place at New York, beginning in December 1943 and taking until March 1944 to complete. During her second refit, her forecastle was extended. After that overhaul, Agassiz escorted North American coastal convoys with the Western Local Escort Force from March 1944 until February 1945. In April 1944, she was assigned to escort group W-2 and in August of that year to W-7. She remained with that group until the end of the war.

Following the end of hostilities Agassiz was paid off 14 June 1945 at Sydney, Nova Scotia. For service in during the Second World War, Agassiz was awarded the battle honours "Atlantic 1941–45" and "Gulf of St. Lawrence 1944." She was sold for scrap November 1945 and broken up at Moncton, New Brunswick in 1946.

=== Trans-Atlantic convoys escorted ===
Convoy	Escort Group	Dates	Notes
OB 347		22–31 July 1941	64 ships escorted without loss from Iceland to dispersal
HX 143		8–17 August 1941	73 ships escorted without loss from Newfoundland to Iceland
ON 8		21–25 August 1941	46 ships escorted without loss from Iceland to Newfoundland
SC 44		12–22 September 1941	Newfoundland to Iceland; 4 ships torpedoed & sunk
ON 19A		22 September-4 October 1941	Iceland shuttle
SC 50		19–31 October 1941	41 ships escorted without loss from Newfoundland to Iceland
ON 32		6–14 November 1941	49 ships escorted without loss from Iceland to Newfoundland
SC 56		24 November-5 December 1941	45 ships escorted without loss from Newfoundland to Iceland
HX 184		12–19 April 1942	30 ships escorted without loss from Newfoundland to Northern Ireland
ON 91		2–11 May 1942	31 ships escorted without loss from Northern Ireland to Newfoundland
HX 190	MOEF group A3	20–27 May 1942	18 ships escorted without loss from Newfoundland to Northern Ireland
ON 102	MOEF group A3	10–21 June 1942	Northern Ireland to Newfoundland; 1 ship torpedoed & sunk
HX 196	MOEF group A3	2–10 July 1942	42 ships escorted without loss from Newfoundland to Northern Ireland
ON 114	MOEF group A3	20–30 July 1942	32 ships escorted without loss from Northern Ireland to Newfoundland
ON 115	MOEF group C3	31 July-3 August 1942	battle reinforcement
SC 97	MOEF group C2	22–26 August 1942	Newfoundland to Northern Ireland: 2 ships torpedoed & sunk
SC 98	MOEF group C3	2–8 September 1942	69 ships escorted without loss from Newfoundland to Northern Ireland
ON 131	MOEF group C3	19–28 September 1942	54 ships escorted without loss from Northern Ireland to Newfoundland
HX 210	MOEF group C3	7–14 October 1942	36 ships escorted without loss from Newfoundland to Northern Ireland
ON 141	MOEF group C3	26 October-3 November 1942	59 ships escorted without loss from Northern Ireland to Newfoundland
SC 109	MOEF group C3	16–27 November 1942	Newfoundland to Northern Ireland; 2 ships torpedoed (1 sank)
ON 152	MOEF group C3	10–28 December 1942	15 ships escorted without loss from Northern Ireland to Newfoundland
SC 127	MOEF group C1	20 April-2 May 1943	55 ships escorted without loss from Newfoundland to Northern Ireland
ON 184	MOEF group C1	16–25 May 1943	39 ships escorted without loss from Northern Ireland to Newfoundland
HX 242		6–14 June 1943	61 ships escorted without loss from Newfoundland to Northern Ireland
ON 190		25 June-3 July 1943	87 ships escorted without loss from Northern Ireland to Newfoundland
HX 247		14–21 July 1943	71 ships escorted without loss from Newfoundland to Northern Ireland
ON 195		1–8 August 1943	51 ships escorted without loss from Northern Ireland to Newfoundland
HX 252		20–27 August 1943	52 ships escorted without loss from Newfoundland to Northern Ireland
ON 201		10–18 September 1943	70 ships escorted without loss from Northern Ireland to Newfoundland
HX 258		28 September-5 October 1943	59 ships escorted without loss from Newfoundland to Northern Ireland
ON 207		19–28 October 1943	52 ships escorted without loss from Northern Ireland to Newfoundland
HX 264		5–16 November 1943	65 ships escorted without loss from Newfoundland to Northern Ireland
ON 213		27 November–7 December 1943	60 ships escorted without loss from Northern Ireland to Newfoundland

== Sources ==
- Brown, David K. (2007). Atlantic Escorts Ships: Ships, Weapons & Tactics in World War II. Barnsley, UK: Seaforth Publishing. ISBN 978-1-84415-702-0.
- Fitzsimons, Bernard, ed. (1978). The Illustrated Encyclopedia of 20th Century Weapons & Warfare. Vol. 11. London: Phoebus. OCLC 8842839.
- Jane's Fighting Ships of World War II. New Jersey: Random House. 1996. ISBN 0-517-67963-9.
- Lynch, Thomas G. (1981). Canada's Flowers, History of the Corvettes of Canada. Halifax, Nova Scotia: Nimbus Publishing. ISBN 0-920852-15-7.
- Macpherson, Ken & Barrie, Ron (2002). The Ships of Canada's Naval Forces 1910–2002 (Third ed.). St. Catharines, Ontario: Vanwell Publishing. ISBN 1-55125-072-1.
- McKay, John & Harland, John (1993). Anatomy of the Ship: The Flower Class Corvette Agassiz. St. Catharines, Ontario: Vanwell Publishing. ISBN 1-55068-084-6.
- Preston, Antony & Raven, Alan (1973). Flower Class Corvettes. Signal. London: Bivouac Books. ISBN 0-85680-004-X.
- Rohwer, Jürgen (2005). Chronology of the War at Sea 1939–1945: The Naval History of World War Two (Revised & Expanded ed.). Annapolis, Maryland: Naval Institute Press. ISBN 1-59114-119-2.
- Thomas, David A. (1998). Battles and Honours of the Royal Navy. Barnsley, UK: Leo Cooper. ISBN 085052-623-X.
