= Nottingham (disambiguation) =

Nottingham is a city in England, and the county town of Nottinghamshire.

Nottingham may also refer to:

== Places ==
=== United Kingdom ===
- Nottingham (UK Parliament constituency), 1295–1885
- Nottingham (European Parliament constituency), 1979–1994
- Greater Nottingham, a unitary authority due to be formed in 2028

=== United States ===
- Nottingham, Indiana
- Nottingham, Maryland
- Nottingham, Prince George's County, Maryland
- Nottingham, New Hampshire
- Nottingham, New Jersey
- Nottingham, Ohio
- Nottingham, West Virginia
- Nottingham Township, Harrison County, Ohio
- Nottingham Township, Pennsylvania
- East Nottingham Township, Pennsylvania
- West Nottingham Township, Pennsylvania
- Livermore, California, which once had a post office referred to as Nottingham

== People ==
- Earl of Nottingham, a title in the Peerage of England, including a list of men who have borne this title
- Edward Nottingham (born 1948), United States federal judge
- Jacob Nottingham (born 1995), American baseball player
- Wayne B. Nottingham (1899–1964), physics professor at Massachusetts Institute of Technology.

== Ships ==
- HMS Nottingham, various Royal Navy ships
- MV Nottingham (1941), a merchant ship sunk in 1941
- MV Nottingham (1949), a merchant ship scrapped in 1971
- Nottingham (1787 EIC ship), an East Indiaman

== Fiction ==
- Sheriff of Nottingham, the fictional villain in the Robin Hood legend
- Ian Nottingham, a character from the Witchblade comic and television series
- Robin Hood (2010 film) (original title: Nottingham)

== Other uses ==
- Nottingham (HM Prison), a Category B men's prison in Nottingham, England
- Nottingham (speedway), a 1930s motorcycle racing team
- Nottingham Cooperative, a housing cooperative in Madison, Wisconsin
- "Nottingham Lace", a song by guitarist Buckethead from the 2005 album Enter the Chicken
- Nottingham system, a modification of the Bloom–Richardson grading system for breast tumors

== See also ==
- Mottingham, a district of London
