= MV Nottingham (1941) =

Refrigerated cargo motor ship torpedoed on her maiden voyage

Coordinates: 53°24′N 31°51′W

History

United Kingdom
- Name: Nottingham
- Namesake: Nottingham
- Owner: Federal Steam Nav Co
- Port of registry: London
- Builder: Alexander Stephen & Sons
- Yard number: 576
- Launched: 12 August 1941
- Completed: November 1941
- Identification: UK Official number 168227; Call sign BCPS
- Fate: Sunk by torpedo, 7 Nov 1941

General characteristics
- Type: refrigerated cargo ship
- Tonnage: 8,532 GRT, 5,022 NRT
- Length: 457.5 ft (139.4 m)
- Beam: 60.3 ft (18.4 m)
- Draught: 27 ft 5 in (8.36 m)
- Depth: 35.6 ft (10.9 m)
- Decks: 3
- Installed power: 1,294 NHP
- Propulsion: single-acting two-stroke diesel
- Speed: 15 knots (28 km/h)
- Crew: 56 crew + 6 DEMS gunners
- Sensors & processing systems: wireless direction finding; echo sounding device
- Notes: sister ship: Gloucester

MV Nottingham was a refrigerated cargo motor ship that was built in Scotland in 1941 for the Federal Steam Navigation Co. On her maiden voyage a u-boat torpedoed her, sinking her with all hands.

She was the first of two ships of this name in the Federal Steam fleet. The second Nottingham was a motor ship that was launched in 1949 and scrapped in 1971.

== Building ==
In 1941 Alexander Stephen and Sons of Linthouse, Glasgow built a pair of refrigerated cargo ships for Federal Steam. Gloucester was launched on 3 March 1941 and completed that July. Her sister ship Nottingham was launched on 12 August and completed at the beginning of November.

Each ship had a registered length of 457.5 ft (139.4 m), beam of 60.3 ft (18.4 m) and depth of 35.6 ft (10.9 m). Each had a single screw driven by a Barclay, Curle & Co six-cylinder, single-acting, two-stroke diesel engine. Nottingham's engine was rated at 1,294 NHP and gave her a speed of 15 knots (28 km/h).

== Loss ==
At the beginning of November 1941 Nottingham left Glasgow on her maiden voyage. She was bound for New York with a general cargo that included Scotch whisky. Her Master was Captain Francis Cecil Pretty, who in 1917 had been awarded the DSC when he was a Lieutenant in the Royal Naval Reserve, and in February 1941 had been made an OBE for keeping control of his ship after she was damaged by enemy action.

On the night of 7 November U-74 engaged Nottingham in mid-Atlantic about 550 nautical miles (1,020 km) southeast of Cape Farewell, Greenland. Nottingham tried to ram the U-boat, but missed. The U-boat fired a torpedo from one of its stern tubes, which hit Nottingham in the stern at 2234 hrs. Nottingham stopped, and at 2250 hrs U-74 fired a spread of two torpedoes, both of which missed. At 2259 hrs a further torpedo from the U-boat hit Nottingham, sinking her.

U-74 saw Nottingham's crew abandon ship in her lifeboats. But none of the boats was seen again, and all of Nottingham's 56 crew and six DEMS gunners were lost.
