= Convoy PQ 3 =

- Part of Arctic Convoys of the Second World War
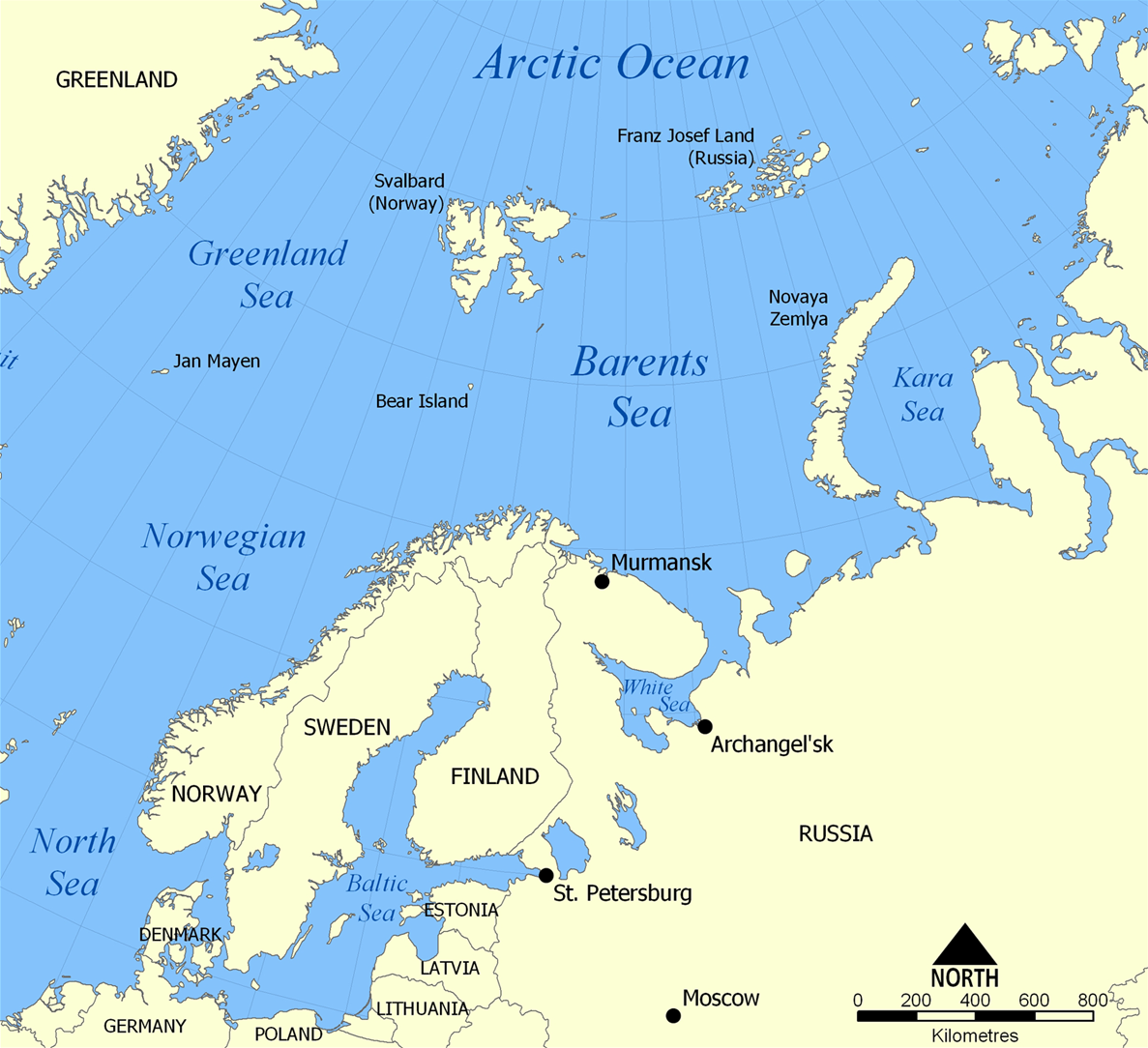
- The Norwegian and the Barents seas, site of the Arctic convoys
Date	9−22 November 1941
Location	Arctic Ocean
Result	British victory

Belligerents
Royal Navy; Merchant Navy; Panama	Kriegsmarine; Luftwaffe

Strength
8 merchant ships; 8 escorts (in relay)	Luftflotte 5; Kriegsmarine

Casualties and losses
1 early return, ice damage	Nil

Convoy PQ 3 (9−22 November 1941) was the fourth of the Arctic Convoys of the Second World War by which the Western Allies supplied the Soviet Union in its fight with Nazi Germany. The departure of Convoy PQ 3 was delayed for destroyers to repair weather damage and because of intelligence reports of an imminent sortie by the German battleship Tirpitz and the heavy cruiser Admiral Scheer.

The convoy sailed from Hvalfjord in Iceland and arrived unhindered at Arkhangelsk, except for the British freighter SS Briarwood that suffered ice damage and returned to Iceland, escorted by the trawler HMT Hamlet. On 28 November Convoy PQ 3 entered the Northern Dvina with Convoy PQ 4, a faster convoy that had caught up since leaving Iceland on 17 November.

== Background ==
=== Arctic Ocean ===
Between Greenland and Norway are some of the most stormy waters of the world's oceans, 890 mi (1,440 km) of water under gales full of snow, sleet and hail. Around the North Cape and the Barents Sea the sea temperature rarely rises about 4° Celsius and a man in the water would probably die unless rescued immediately. The cold water and air made spray freeze on the superstructure of ships, which had to be removed quickly to avoid the ship becoming top-heavy. The cold Arctic water is met by the Gulf Stream, warm water from the Gulf of Mexico, which becomes the North Atlantic Drift. Arriving at the south-west of England, the drift moves between Scotland and Iceland.

North of Norway the drift splits, one stream of the North Atlantic Drift goes north of Bear Island to Svalbard and the southern stream follows the coast of Murmansk into the Barents Sea. The mingling of cold Arctic water and warmer water of higher salinity generates thick banks of fog for convoys to hide in but the waters drastically reduce the effectiveness of Asdic as U-boats moved in waters of differing temperatures and density. In winter, polar ice can form as far south as 50 mi (80 km) of the North Cape forcing ships closer to Luftwaffe air bases or being able to sail further out to sea in summer when the ice can recede northwards as far as Svalbard. The region is in perpetual darkness in winter and permanent daylight in the summer which makes air reconnaissance almost impossible or easy.

=== Arctic convoys ===
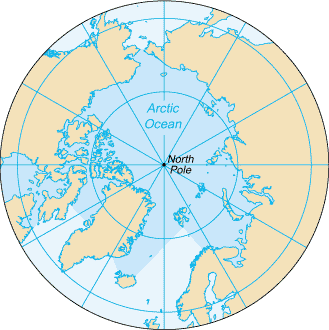
Diagram of the Arctic Ocean

The Soviet authorities had claimed that the unloading capacity of Arkhangelsk was 300,000 long tons (300,000 t), Vladivostok 140,000 long tons (140,000 t) and 60,000 long tons (61,000 t) by the Persian Gulf route. When surveyed by British and US technicians, the capacity of the ten berths at Arkhangelsk was assessed as 90,000 long tons (91,000 t) and the same from Murmansk from its eight berths. By late 1941, the convoy system used in the Atlantic had been established on the Arctic run; a convoy commodore ensured that the ships' masters and signals officers attended a briefing before sailing to make arrangements for the management of the convoy, which sailed in a formation of long rows of short columns. The commodore was usually a retired naval officer, aboard a ship identified by a white pendant with a blue cross. The commodore was assisted by a Naval signals party of four men, who used lamps, semaphore flags and telescopes to pass signals, coded from books carried in a bag, weighted to be dumped overboard. In large convoys, the commodore was assisted by vice- and rear-commodores to direct the speed, course and zig-zagging of the merchant ships and liaise with the escort commander.

A convoy was defined as at least one merchant ship sailing under the protection of at least one warship. At first the British had intended to run convoys to Russia on a forty-day cycle (the number of days between convoy departures) during the winter of 1941–1942 but this was shortened to a ten-day cycle. The round trip to Murmansk for warships was three weeks and each convoy needed a cruiser and two destroyers, which severely depleted the Home Fleet. Convoys left port and rendezvoused with the escorts at sea. A cruiser provided distant cover from a position to the west of Bear Island. Air support was limited to 330 Squadron and 269 Squadron, RAF Coastal Command from Iceland, with some help from anti-submarine patrols from Sullom Voe, in Shetland, along the coast of Norway. Anti-submarine trawlers escorted the convoys on the first part of the outbound journey. Built for Arctic conditions, trawlers were coal-burning ships with sufficient endurance. The trawlers were operated by their peacetime crews and captains, with the rank of Skipper, Royal Naval Reserve (RNR), who were used to Arctic conditions, supplemented by anti-submarine specialists of the Royal Naval Volunteer Reserve (RNVR).

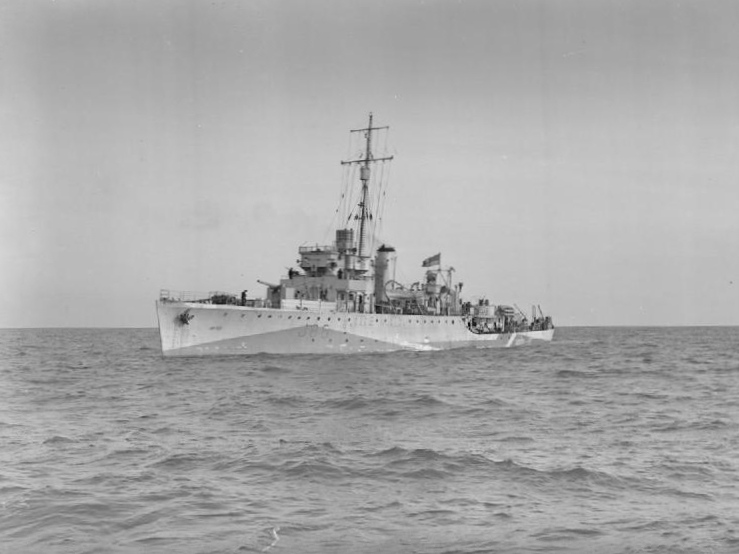
Example of a Halcyon-class minesweeper (HMS Salamander in 1943)

British minesweepers based at Arkhangelsk met the convoys to join the escort for the remainder of the voyage. In October 1941, the unloading capacity of Arkhangelsk was 300,000 long tons (300,000 t), Vladivostok (in the Pacific) 140,000 long tons (140,000 t) and 60,000 long tons (61,000 t) in the Persian Gulf (for the Persian Corridor route) ports. The first convoy was due at Murmansk around 12 October and the next convoy was to depart Iceland on 22 October. A motley of British, Allied and neutral shipping loaded with military stores and raw materials for the Soviet war effort assembled at Hvalfjörður (Hvalfiord) in Iceland, convenient for ships from both sides of the Atlantic. In winter, due to the polar ice expanding southwards, the convoy route ran closer to Norway. The voyage was between 1,400 and 2,000 nmi (2,600 and 3,700 km; 1,600 and 2,300 mi) each way, taking at least three weeks for a round trip.

=== First Protocol ===
The Soviet leaders needed to replace the colossal losses of military equipment lost after Operation Barbarossa the German invasion began, especially when Soviet war industries were being moved out of the war zone and emphasised tank and aircraft deliveries. Machine tools, steel and aluminium was needed to replace indigenous resources lost in the invasion. The pressure on the civilian sector of the economy needed to be limited by food deliveries. The Soviets wanted to concentrate the resources that remained on items that the Soviet war economy that had the greatest comparative advantage over the German economy. Aluminium imports allowed aircraft production to a far greater extent than would have been possible using local sources and tank production was emphasised at the expense of lorries and food supplies were squeezed by reliance on what could be obtained from lend–lease. At the Moscow Conference, it was acknowledged that 1.5 million tons of shipping was needed to transport the supplies of the First Protocol and that Soviet sources could provide less than 10 per cent of the carrying capacity.

The British and Americans accepted that the onus was on them to find most of the shipping, despite their commitments in other theatres. The Prime Minister, Winston Churchill, made a commitment to send a convoy to the Arctic ports of the USSR every ten days and to deliver 1,200 tanks a month from July 1942 to January 1943, followed by 2,000 tanks and another 3,600 aircraft more than already promised. In November, the US president, Franklin D. Roosevelt, ordered Admiral Emory Land of the US Maritime Commission and then the head of the War Shipping Administration that deliveries to Russia should only be limited by 'insurmountable difficulties'. The first convoy was due at Murmansk around 12 October and the next convoy was to depart Iceland on 22 October. A motley of British, Allied and neutral shipping loaded with military stores and raw materials for the Soviet war effort would be assembled at Hvalfjörður in Iceland, convenient for ships from both sides of the Atlantic.

From Operation Dervish to Convoy PQ 11, the supplies to the USSR were mostly British, in British ships defended by the Royal Navy. A fighter force that could defend Murmansk was delivered that protected the Arctic ports and railways into the hinterland. British supplied aircraft and tanks reinforced the Russian defences of Leningrad and Moscow from December 1941. The tanks and aircraft did not save Moscow but were important in the Soviet counter-offensive. The Luftwaffe was by then reduced to 600 operational aircraft on the Eastern Front, to an extent a consequence of Luftflotte 2 being sent to the Mediterranean against the British. Tanks and aircraft supplied by the British helped the Soviet counter-offensive force back the Germans further than might have been possible. In January and February 1941, deliveries of tanks and aircraft allowed the Russians to have a margin of safety should the Germans attempt to counter-attack.

=== Signals intelligence ===
==== Bletchley Park ====
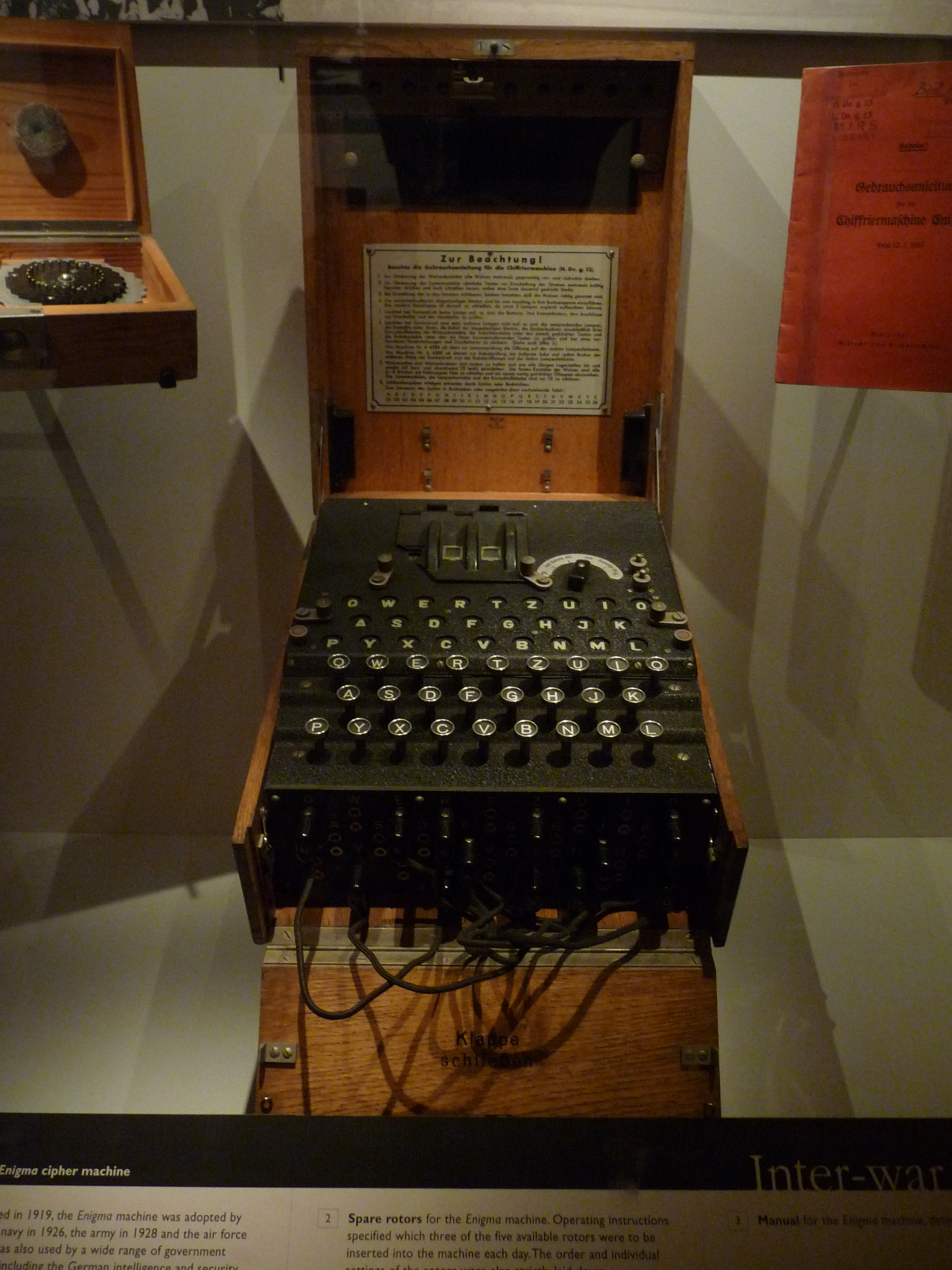
Photograph of a German Enigma coding machine

The British Government Code and Cypher School (GC&CS) based at Bletchley Park housed a small industry of code-breakers and traffic analysts. By June 1941, the German Enigma machine Home Waters (Heimish) settings used by surface ships and U-boats could quickly be read. On 1 February 1942, the Enigma machines used in U-boats in the Atlantic and Mediterranean were changed but German ships and the U-boats in Arctic waters continued with the older Heimish (Hydra from 1942, Dolphin to the British). By mid-1941, British Y-stations were able to receive and read Luftwaffe W/T transmissions and give advance warning of Luftwaffe operations. In 1941, naval Headache personnel, with receivers to eavesdrop on Luftwaffe wireless transmissions, were embarked on warships.

==== B-Dienst ====
The rival German Beobachtungsdienst (B-Dienst, Observation Service) of the Kriegsmarine Marinenachrichtendienst (MND, Naval Intelligence Service) had broken several Admiralty codes and cyphers by 1939, which were used to help Kriegsmarine ships elude British forces and provide opportunities for surprise attacks. From June to August 1940, six British submarines were sunk in the Skaggerak using information gleaned from British wireless signals. In 1941, B-Dienst read signals from the Commander in Chief Western Approaches informing convoys of areas patrolled by U-boats, enabling the submarines to move into "safe" zones.

== Prelude ==
=== Kriegsmarine ===
German naval forces in Norway were commanded by Hermann Böhm, the Kommandierender Admiral Norwegen. Two U-boats were based in Norway in July 1941, four in September, five in December and four due in January 1942. Grand Admiral (Großadmiral) Erich Raeder, head of the Kriegsmarine, proposed a sortie to the Führer, Adolf Hitler, on 13 November but fuel shortage and the fate of Bismarck, led Hitler to veto the suggestion; Admiral Scheer was sent to northern Norway. Raeder withdrew the torpedo boats in the north and replaced them with Type 1934-class destroyers. The destroyers carried a heavy armament of five 5-inch guns and eight torpedo tubes but suffered from unreliable boilers. Raeder ordered Karl Dönitz, the commander of the U-boat arm (Befehlshaber der U-Boote [BdU]) to send U-boats to Norway sufficient to keep three on patrol.

=== Luftflotte 5 ===
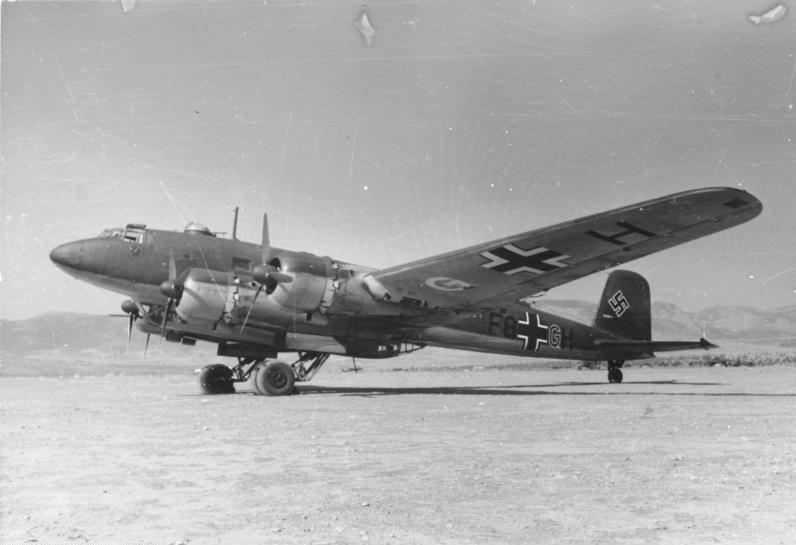
A Focke-Wulf Fw 200 Kondor of KG 40

In mid-1941, Luftflotte 5 (Air Fleet 5) had been re-organised for Operation Barbarossa when Luftgau Norwegen (Air Region Norway) was headquartered in Oslo. Fliegerführer Stavanger (Air Commander Stavanger) the centre and north of Norway, Jagdfliegerführer Norwegen (Fighter Leader Norway) commanded the fighter force and Fliegerführer Kerkenes (Oberst [colonel] Andreas Nielsen) in the far north had airfields at Kirkenes and Banak. The Air Fleet had 180 aircraft, sixty of which were reserved for operations on the Karelian Front against the Red Army.

The distance from Banak to Arkhangelsk was 560 mi (900 km) and Fliegerführer Kerkenes had only ten Junkers Ju 88 bombers of Kampfgeschwader 30, thirty Stukas, ten Messerschmitt Bf 109 fighters of Jagdgeschwader 77, five Messerschmitt Bf 110 heavy fighters of Zerstörergeschwader 76, ten reconnaissance aircraft and an anti-aircraft battalion. Sixty aircraft were far from adequate in such a climate and terrain where "there is no favourable season for operations" (Earl F. Ziemke). The emphasis of air operations changed from army support to anti-shipping operations as Allied Arctic convoys became more frequent.

==== Air-sea rescue ====
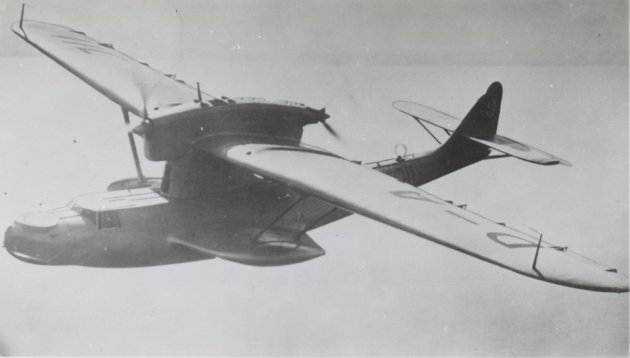
Example of a Dornier Do 18 seaplane

The Luftwaffe Sea Rescue Service (Seenotdienst) along with the Kriegsmarine, the Norwegian Society for Sea Rescue (RS) and ships on passage, recovered aircrew and shipwrecked sailors. The service comprised Seenotbereich VIII at Stavanger, covering Bergen and Trondheim with Seenotbereich IX at Kirkenes for Tromsø, Billefjord and Kirkenes. Co-operation was as important in rescues as it was in anti-shipping operations if aircrew were to be saved before they succumbed to the climate and severe weather.

Aircraft comprised Heinkel He 59 floatplanes, with Dornier Do 18 and Dornier Do 24 seaplanes. Oberkommando der Luftwaffe (OKL, the high command of the Luftwaffe) was not able to increase the number of search and rescue aircraft in Norway, due to a general shortage of aircraft and crews, despite Stumpff pointing out that coming down in such cold waters required extremely swift recovery and that his crews "must be given a chance of rescue" or morale could not be maintained.

=== Home Fleet ===
Admiral John Tovey managed to postpone the sailing of Convoy PQ 3 to have time for repairs to be undertaken by destroyers that had suffered storm damage and also because of intelligence reports that a sortie by the German battleship Tirpitz and the heavy cruiser Admiral Scheer. The convoy consisted of the British SS Briarwood, SS Cape Corso, SS Cape Race, SS Cocle, SS San Ambrosio, SS Trekieve, SS Wanstead and the Panamanian-flagged SS El Capitan. The convoy was escorted from Iceland by the armed trawlers HMT Hamlet and HMT Macbeth and then met by the cruiser HMS Kenya and the destroyers HMS Bedouin Intrepid; Macbeth making the journey straight through to Murmansk.

== Voyage ==
The convoy made a delayed departure on 9 November and MV Briarwood, returned to Iceland with ice damage, escorted by Hamlet. The convoy was met by on 14 November by met by the cruiser Kenya and the destroyers Bedouin and Intrepid. The Soviet destroyer Sokrushitelny and the Halcyon-class minesweepers HMS Bramble, Seagull and Speedy of the eastern local escort, joined for the last leg to Arkhangelsk on 20 November. On 28 November Convoy PQ 3 entered the Northern Dvina with Convoy PQ 4, a faster convoy that had overhauled Convoy PQ 3 since leaving Iceland on 17 November.

== Aftermath ==
=== Analysis ===
Convoy PQ 3 escaped detection by German reconnaissance aircraft in the winter weather and arrived without loss, except for the early return to Iceland by Briarwood. Neither side suffered casualties. Convoy PQ 3 arrived without loss on 22 November 1941. The convoy was part of a run to Convoy PQ 11 that had little difficulty apart from the weather, in reaching the Arctic north of the USSR. The convoys delivered 75 ships out of 77, with one early return and one loss to a U-boat.

== British order of battle ==
=== Merchant ships ===
Sailing order
Ship	Year	Flag	GRT	P'n	Notes
SS Briarwood	1930	Merchant Navy	4,019	—	Ice damage, returned with Hamlet
SS Cape Corso	1929	Merchant Navy	3,807	—	Convoy position not known
SS Cape Race	1930	Merchant Navy	3,807	32	
SS Cocle	1920	Merchant Navy	5,630	31	
SS El Capitan	1917	Panama	5,255	12	
SS San Ambrosio	1935	Merchant Navy	7,410	22	
SS Trekieve	1919	Merchant Navy	5,244	11	
SS Wanstead	1928	Merchant Navy	5,486	21	Convoy Commodore

=== Convoy formation ===
The position of Cape Corso is not known, Briarwood was forced out the convoy with ice damage and returned to Iceland.

Convoy formation (Note: Convoys had a standard formation of short columns, number 1 to the left in the direction of travel. Each position in the column was numbered; 11 was the first ship in column 1 and 12 was the second ship in the column; 21 was the first ship in column 2.)
column 1	column 2	column 3
11 Trekieve	21 Wanstead	31 Cocle
12 El Capitan	22 San Ambrosio	32 Cape Race
13 —	23 Cape Corso?	33 —

=== Convoy escorts ===
Convoy escorts
Ship	Flag	Type	Notes
Icelandic local escort
HMT Hamlet	Royal Navy	Shakespearian-class trawler	9–14 November
HMT Macbeth	Royal Navy	Shakespearian-class trawler	9–15 November
Oceanic escort
HMS Kenya	Royal Navy	Fiji-class cruiser	14–20 November
HMS Bedouin	Royal Navy	B-class destroyer	14–20 November
HMS Intrepid	Royal Navy	I-class destroyer	14 –20 November
Murmansk local escort
Sokrushitelny	Soviet Navy	Gnevny-class destroyer	20–22 November
HMS Bramble	Royal Navy	Halcyon-class minesweeper	20–22 November
HMS Seagull	Royal Navy	Halcyon-class minesweeper	20–22 November
HMS Speedy	Royal Navy	Halcyon-class minesweeper	20–22 November
