= HMS Honeysuckle (K27) =

Flower-class corvette

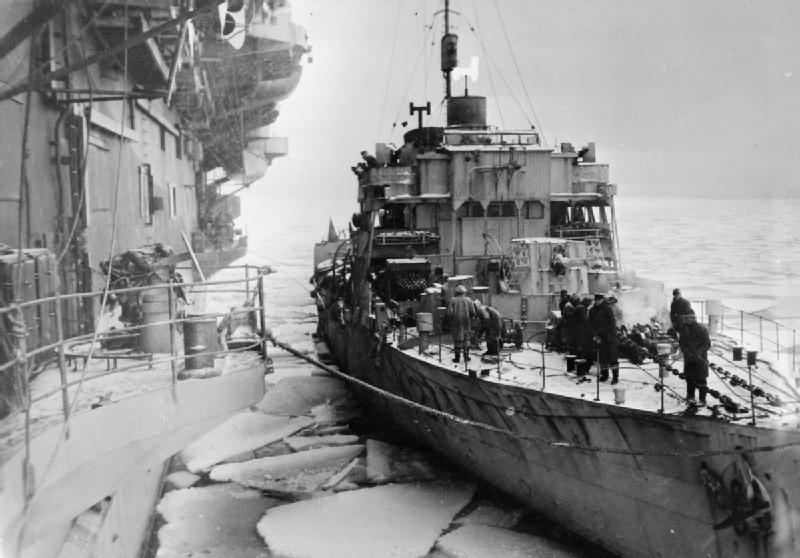
- HMS Honeysuckle coming alongside the aircraft carrier Trumpeter in the Kola Inlet

History

United Kingdom
- Name: Rhododendron
- Ordered: 31 August 1939
- Builder: (Scotland) Ferguson Shipbuilders. Ltd., Port Glasgow
- Laid down: 26 October 1939
- Launched: 22 April 1940
- Commissioned: 14 September 1940
- Out of service: 1950 – sold to T.W. Ward
- Identification: Pennant number: K27
- Fate: Sold 1950; scrapped November 1950

General characteristics
- Class & type: Flower-class corvette (original)
- Displacement: 925 long tons (940 t; 1,036 short tons)
- Length: 205 ft (62.48 m)o/a
- Beam: 33 ft (10.06 m)
- Draught: 11.5 ft (3.51 m)
- Propulsion: single shaft; 2 × fire tube Scotch boilers; 1 × 4-cycle triple-expansion reciprocating steam engine; 2,750 ihp (2,050 kW)
- Speed: 16 knots (29.6 km/h)
- Range: 3,500 nautical miles (6,482 km) at 12 knots (22.2 km/h)
- Complement: 85
- Sensors & processing systems: 1 × SW1C or 2C radar; 1 × Type 123A or Type 127DV sonar
- Armament: 1 × BL 4-inch (101.6 mm) Mk.IX single gun; 2 x double Lewis machine gun; 2 × twin Vickers machine gun; 2 × Mk.II depth charge throwers; 2 × depth charge rails with 40 depth charges; initially with minesweeper equipment, later removed

HMS Honeysuckle was a Flower-class corvette that served with the Royal Navy during the Second World War. She served as an ocean escort in the Battle of the Atlantic.

== Background ==
The ship was commissioned on 31 August 1939 by Harland & Wolff from Port Glasgow in Scotland.

== War service ==
On 20 September 1941, HMS Honeysuckle picked up 51 survivors from the CAM ship Empire Burton, which was torpedoed by the German U-boat U-74. That same day, she picked up an additional 22 survivors from the tanker T.J. Williams, which has torpedoed by a different U-boat, U-552. On 4 July 1943, she picked up 276 survivors from the merchant St. Essylt, which was torpedoed by U-375 off of Algeria.

== Fate ==
She was scrapped in 1950 at Grays.

== Sources ==
- Gardiner, Robert (1987). Conway's All the World's Fighting Ships 1922–1946. London: Conway Maritime Press. ISBN 0-85177-146-7.
- Preston, Antony; Raven, Alan (1982). Flower Class Corvettes. London: Arms and Armour Press. ISBN 0-85368-559-2.
- Friedman, Norman (2008). British Destroyers & Frigates – The Second World War and After. Barnsley, UK: Seaforth Publishing. ISBN 978-1-84832-015-4.
