= SS Empire Burton =

World War II merchant ship of the United Kingdom

History
- Name: Empire Burton
- Owner: Ministry of War Transport
- Operator: Common Bros Ltd
- Port of registry: (United Kingdom) Sunderland
- Builder: Short Brothers Ltd, Pallion
- Yard number: 466
- Launched: 29 May 1941
- Completed: August 1941
- Out of service: 20 September 1941
- Identification: UK Official Number 168915; Code Letters BCMR
- Fate: Torpedoed and sunk 20 September 1941

General characteristics
- Tonnage: 6,966 GRT; 4,880 NRT
- Length: 427 ft 5 in (130.28 m)
- Beam: 57 ft (17.37 m)
- Depth: 34 ft 3 in (10.44 m)
- Propulsion: 1 x triple expansion steam engine
- Crew: 49, plus 5 DEMS gunners and 6 RAF personnel

Location of the sinking of Empire Burton.

Empire Burton was a 6,966 GRT CAM Ship which was built in 1941 for the Ministry of War Transport (MoWT). Completed in August 1941, she was torpedoed on 20 September 1941 by U-74 and sunk.

== Description ==
Empire Burton was built by Short Brothers Ltd, Pallion for the MoWT. She was yard number 466. Empire Burton was launched on 29 May 1941 and completed in August 1941.

The ship was 427 feet 5 inches (130.28 m) long, with a beam of 57 feet (17.37 m) and a depth of 34 feet 3 inches (10.44 m). She was propelled by a triple expansion steam engine which had cylinders of 24 inches (61 cm), 39 inches (99 cm), and 68 inches (170 cm) bore by 48 inches (120 cm) stroke. The engine was built by North East Marine Engine Works, Newcastle upon Tyne.

== Career ==
Empire Burton had a short career. She was completed in August 1941 and placed under the management of Common Brothers Ltd, Newcastle upon Tyne. Her port of registry was Sunderland. Empire Burton was a member of two convoys.

ON 9

Convoy ON 9 departed from Milford Haven on 19 August 1941 and Liverpool on 20 August. It dispersed at sea on 25 August. Empire Burton was bound for Halifax, Nova Scotia.

SC 44

Convoy SC 44 departed from Halifax, calling at Sydney from where the convoy departed on 11 September bound for Liverpool. She was carrying a cargo of 9,106 long tons (9,252 t) of wheat. At 01:13 (German time) on 20 September 1941, U-74 fired four torpedoes, one of which hit Empire Burton and sank her with the loss of two of the 60 crew. The ship was east of Cape Farewell at the time (61°34′N 35°05′W). The 58 survivors were rescued by HMS Honeysuckle and landed at Reykjavík, Iceland. Those lost on Empire Burton are commemorated at the Tower Hill Memorial, London.

== Official Numbers and Code Letters ==
Official Numbers were a forerunner to IMO Numbers. Empire Burton had the United Kingdom Official Number 168915 and used the Code Letters BCMR.
