= MV Nottingham (1949) =

Refrigerated cargo ship

History

United Kingdom
- Name: Nottingham
- Namesake: Nottingham
- Owner: Federal Steam Nav Co
- Port of registry: London
- Builder: John Brown & Company, Clydebank
- Yard number: 653
- Launched: 22 December 1949
- Completed: 1950
- Fate: Scrapped 1971

General characteristics
- Type: Refrigerated cargo ship
- Tonnage: 6,689 GRT, 3,701 NRT
- Length: 463.5 ft (141.3 m)
- Beam: 61.7 ft (18.8 m)
- Draught: 26.3 ft (8.0 m)
- Depth: 25.9 ft (7.9 m)
- Propulsion: single-acting two-stroke diesel

MV Nottingham was a refrigerated cargo ship that was built in Scotland in 1949 for the Federal Steam Navigation Co and scrapped in Taiwan in 1971.

She was the second of two ships of this name in the Federal Steam fleet. The first Nottingham was a motor ship that was launched in 1941 and sunk with all hands by enemy action on her maiden voyage.

== History ==
John Brown & Company built Nottingham in Clydebank, Glasgow. She was launched on 22 December 1949 and completed in 1950. She was 463.5 ft (141.3 m) long, her beam was 61.7 ft (18.8 m) and her depth was 25.9 ft (7.9 m). She had a single screw, powered by a single-acting two-stroke diesel engine.

Nottingham's usual trade was carrying fruit from New Zealand to the United Kingdom. On 11 August 1971 she arrived in Kaohsiung in Taiwan to be scrapped.

== Bibliography ==
- Laxon, WA; Farquhar, IJ; Kirby, NJ; Perry, FW (1997). Crossed Flags: The Histories of The New Zealand Shipping Company Limited and The Federal Steam Navigation Company Limited and their Subsidiaries. Gravesend: World Ship Society. ISBN 978-0905617879.
- Tysser, Harry F (1972). Fruit Trades World Directory. London: Haymarket Publishing.
