= Nottingham, West Virginia =

- Unincorporated community
- Location within West Virginia Location within the United States
- Coordinates: 38°31′05″N 79°50′35″W
- Country: United States
- State: West Virginia
- County: Pocahontas
- Elevation: 2,677 ft (816 m)
- Time zone: UTC-5 (Eastern (EST))
  - Summer (DST): UTC-4 (EDT)
- Area codes: 304 & 681
- GNIS feature ID: 1555245

Nottingham is an unincorporated community in Pocahontas County, West Virginia, United States. Nottingham is located on the Greenbrier River, 2 miles (3.2 km) south-southeast of Durbin.
