= HMCS Lévis (K115) =

Royal Canadian Navy Fowler-class corvette

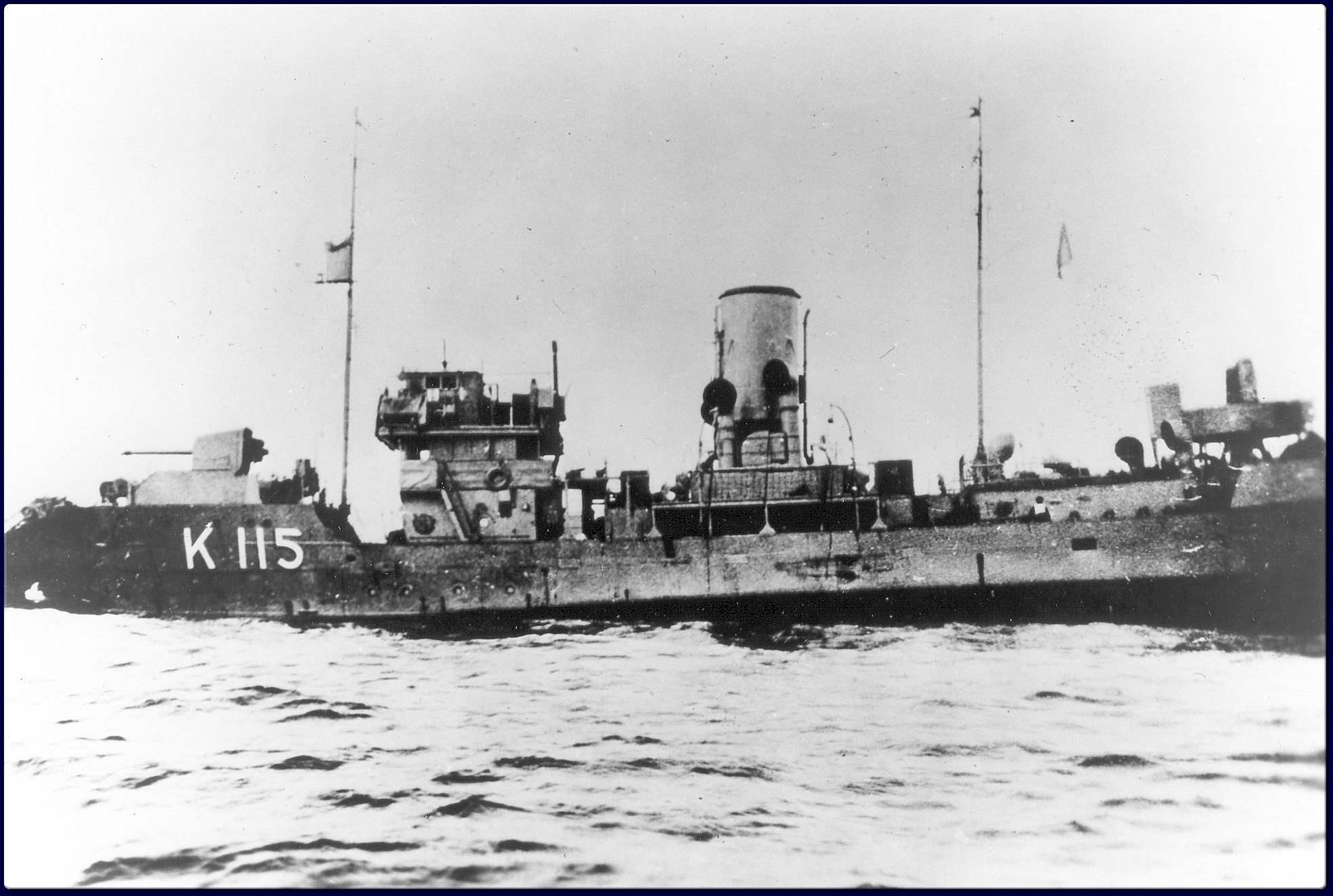
- HMCS Lévis sinking after being torpedoed, 19 September 1941

History

Canada
- Name: Lévis
- Namesake: Lévis, Quebec
- Ordered: 24 January 1940
- Builder: Davie Shipbuilding, Lauzon
- Laid down: 11 March 1940
- Launched: 4 September 1940
- Commissioned: 16 May 1941
- Out of service: 19 September 1941
- Identification: Pennant number: K115
- Honours and awards: Atlantic 1941
- Fate: Torpedoed and sunk 19 September 1941

General characteristics
- Class & type: Flower-class corvette (original)
- Displacement: 925 long tons (940 t; 1,036 short tons)
- Length: 205 ft (62.48 m)o/a
- Beam: 33 ft (10.06 m)
- Draught: 11.5 ft (3.51 m)
- Propulsion: single shaft; 2 × fire tube Scotch boilers; 1 × 4-cycle triple-expansion reciprocating steam engine; 2,750 ihp (2,050 kW)
- Speed: 16 knots (29.6 km/h)
- Range: 3,500 nautical miles (6,482 km) at 12 knots (22.2 km/h)
- Complement: 85
- Sensors & processing systems: 1 × SW1C or 2C radar; 1 × Type 123A or Type 127DV sonar
- Armament: 1 × BL 4 in (102 mm) Mk.IX gun; 2 × .50 cal machine gun (twin); 2 × Lewis .303 cal machine gun (twin); 2 × Mk.II depth charge throwers; 2 × depth charge rails with 40 depth charges

HMCS Lévis was a Royal Canadian Navy Flower-class corvette which took part in convoy escort duties during the Second World War. She was sunk in 1941. She was named for Lévis, Quebec.

== Background ==
Flower-class corvettes like Lévis serving with the Royal Canadian Navy during the Second World War were different from earlier and more traditional sail-driven corvettes. The "corvette" designation was created by the French as a class of small warships; the Royal Navy borrowed the term for a period but discontinued its use in 1877. During the hurried preparations for war in the late 1930s, Winston Churchill reactivated the corvette class, needing a name for smaller ships used in an escort capacity, in this case based on a whaling ship design. The generic name "flower" was used to designate the class of these ships, which – in the Royal Navy – were named after flowering plants.

Corvettes commissioned by the Royal Canadian Navy during the Second World War were named after communities for the most part, to better represent the people who took part in building them. This idea was put forth by Admiral Percy W. Nelles. Sponsors were commonly associated with the community for which the ship was named. Royal Navy corvettes were designed as open sea escorts, while Canadian corvettes were developed for coastal auxiliary roles which was exemplified by their minesweeping gear. Eventually the Canadian corvettes would be modified to allow them to perform better on the open seas.

== Construction ==
Lévis was ordered on 24 January 1940 as part of the 1939-1940 Flower-class building program. She was laid down at George T. Davie Shipbuilding in Lauzon on 11 March 1940 and launched on 4 September of that year. She was commissioned into the RCN on 16 May 1941 at Quebec City, Quebec.

== War service ==
Upon joining the fleet, Lévis was assigned to convoy escort duty in the Northwest Atlantic. In June 1941 she joined the Newfoundland Escort Force. She did one round trip to Iceland before joining convoy SC 44. Lévis was part of the 19th Escort Group escorting convoy SC 44 when she was torpedoed at 0205 local time on 19 September 1941 by U-74 under the command of Eitel-Friedrich Kentrat east of Cape Farewell at position 60°07′N 38°37′W.

The explosion of the torpedo on the port side killed all but 2 of the ratings on the stokers' messdeck. Compartments up to the No. 2 bulkhead were flooded. The surviving crew abandoned ship to Mayflower except for a damage control party of 10 officers and ratings. Mayflower took Lévis under tow for approximately 12 hours, however No. 2 bulkhead was buckled and not watertight and the ship sank at 1710 local time later that day. 91 crew were rescued and 18 were killed as a result of the torpedo attack. Lévis was the first Canadian Flower-class corvette to be sunk.

Her first and only commanding officer was Lieutenant Charles Walter Gilding RCNR.
