= HMCS Mayflower =

Canadian World War II Flower-class corvette

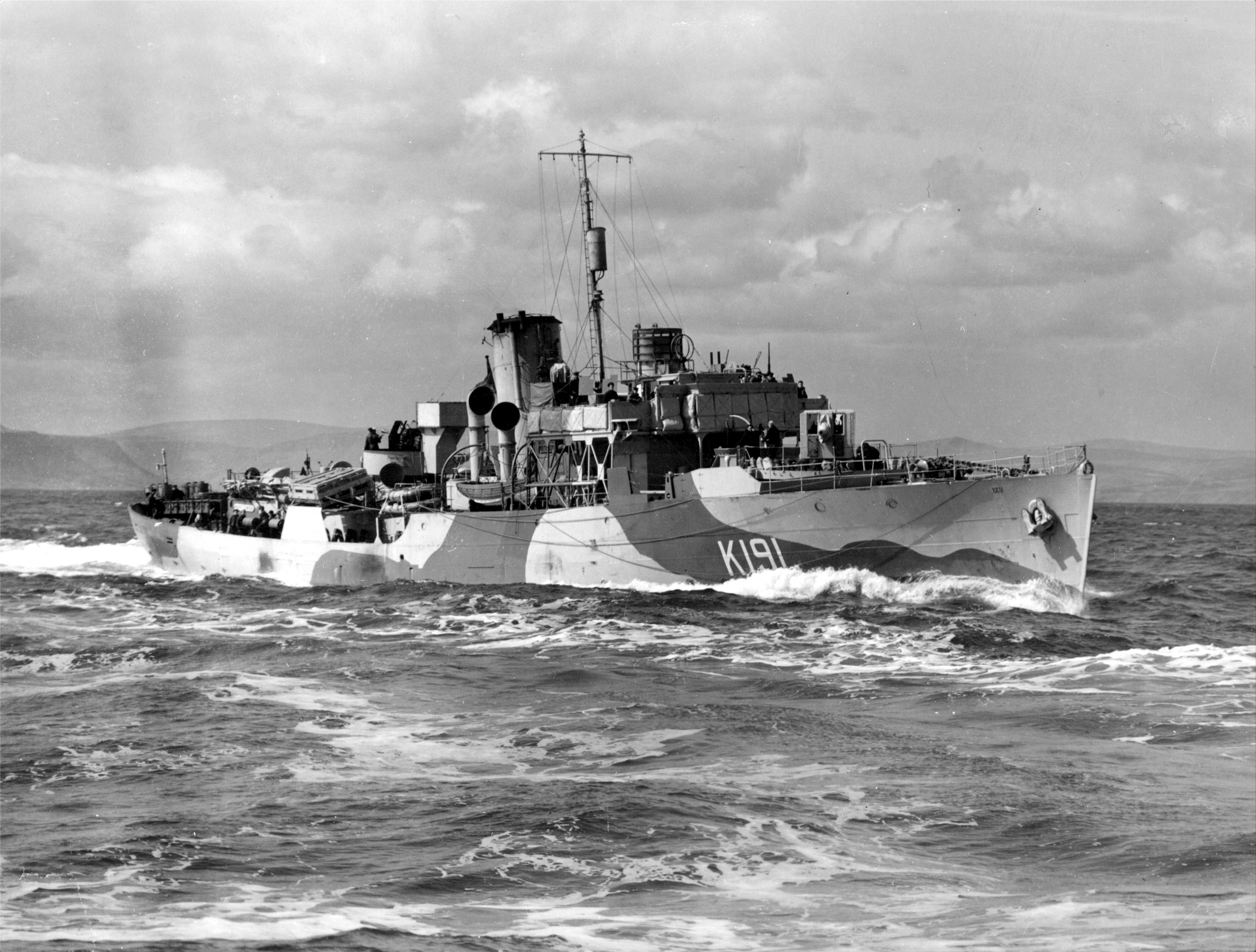
- HMCS Mayflower, circa 1942

History

United Kingdom
- Name: Mayflower
- Namesake: Maianthemum canadense
- Ordered: 20 January 1940
- Builder: Canadian Vickers Ltd., Montreal
- Laid down: 20 February 1940
- Launched: 3 July 1940
- Commissioned: 28 November 1940
- Out of service: 15 May 1941 - loaned to Canada
- Identification: Pennant number: K191
- Fate: Loaned to Canada 1941; returned 1945; scrapped 20 September 1949

Canada
- Name: Mayflower
- Acquired: Loaned from Royal Navy
- Commissioned: 15 May 1941
- Out of service: 31 May 1945
- Identification: Pennant number: K191
- Honours and awards: Atlantic 1941-43; Normandy 1944; English Channel 1945
- Fate: Returned to the Royal Navy 31 May 1945

General characteristics
- Class & type: Flower-class corvette (original)
- Displacement: 925 long tons (940 t; 1,036 short tons)
- Length: 205 ft (62.48 m)o/a
- Beam: 33 ft (10.06 m)
- Draught: 11.5 ft (3.51 m)
- Propulsion: single shaft; 2 × fire tube Scotch boilers; 1 × 4-cycle triple-expansion reciprocating steam engine; 2,750 ihp (2,050 kW)
- Speed: 16 knots (29.6 km/h)
- Range: 3,500 nautical miles (6,482 km) at 12 knots (22.2 km/h)
- Complement: 85
- Sensors & processing systems: 1 × SW1C or 2C radar; 1 × Type 123A or Type 127DV sonar
- Armament: 1 × BL 4 in (102 mm) Mk.IX single gun; 2 × .50 cal machine gun (twin); 2 × Lewis .303 cal machine gun (twin); 2 × Mk.II depth charge throwers; 2 × Depth charge rails with 40 depth charges; originally fitted with minesweeping gear, later removed

HMCS Mayflower was a Flower-class corvette that served mainly in the Royal Canadian Navy during the Second World War but began her service with the Royal Navy. She saw action primarily in the Battle of the Atlantic as an ocean escort. She was named after the flowering plant Maianthemum canadense.

== Background ==
Flower-class corvettes like Mayflower serving with the Royal Canadian Navy during the Second World War were different from earlier and more traditional sail-driven corvettes. The "corvette" designation was created by the French as a class of small warships; the Royal Navy borrowed the term for a period but discontinued its use in 1877. During the hurried preparations for war in the late 1930s, Winston Churchill reactivated the corvette class, needing a name for smaller ships used in an escort capacity, in this case based on a whaling ship design. The generic name "flower" was used to designate the class of these ships, which – in the Royal Navy – were named after flowering plants.

== Construction ==
Mayflower was ordered 20 January 1940 for the Royal Navy as part of the 1939-1940 Flower-class building program. She was laid down on 20 February 1940 by Canadian Vickers Ltd. at Montreal and was launched on 3 July 1940. She was commissioned on 28 November 1940 and sailed to the United Kingdom in February 1941 for completion on the Tyne River in May. On 15 May 1941 Mayflower was one of ten corvettes loaned to Canada. She could be told apart from other Canadian Flowers by her lack of minesweeping gear and the siting of the after gun tub amidships.

During her career, Mayflower had three significant refits. The first took place at Charleston, South Carolina from 9 December 1941 until February 1942. Her second major refit took place from 29 October 1942 until 11 January 1943 at Pictou, Nova Scotia. Mayflower's final refit was done at Norfolk, Virginia from 29 November 1943 to 14 February 1944. During this refit, she had her fo'c'sle extended.

== War service ==
=== Royal Navy ===
After workups, Mayflower had a brief period under Royal Navy command. She was assigned to escort group EG 4 before being transferred to the Royal Canadian Navy.

=== Royal Canadian Navy ===
After her transferral, Mayflower was assigned to Newfoundland Command in June 1941. With this force, she escorted convoys from St. John's to Iceland for the rest of the year with escort groups 19N and N16. In her first month with the group, she was escorting convoy SC 44 when one of the other escorts, HMCS Levis was torpedoed. Mayflower evacuated all non-essential personnel from the derelict ship except for the damage-control party. On 2 October 1941, Mayflower picked up 35 survivors from the British tanker San Florentino that was torpedoed and sunk by the German submarine U-94.

After returning from refit in early 1942, she was deployed as an ocean escort under Mid-Ocean Escort Force (MOEF) command on convoys between St. John's and Derry. She continued performing this duty until April 1944. Mayflower was initially assigned to escort group A-3 in April 1942, but was transferred to C-3 in February 1943.

In April 1944 she was assigned to Western Approaches Command to take part in Operation Neptune, the naval aspect of the invasion of Normandy. On 31 May 1944, she set out to escort the blockships from Oban, which would become part of the beachhead after D-day. After the invasion, Mayflower spent the rest of the war in the waters around the United Kingdom. She was returned to the Royal Navy 31 May 1945.

=== Trans-Atlantic convoys escorted ===
Convoy	Escort Group	Dates	Notes
HX 136		30 June-13 July 1941	Newfoundland to Iceland
HX 143		8-17 Aug 1941	Newfoundland to Iceland
ON 8		21-25 Aug 1941	Iceland to Newfoundland
SC 44		14-22 Sept 1941	Newfoundland to Iceland
ON 19		27 Sept-6 Oct 1941	Iceland to Newfoundland
SC 49		13-22 Oct 1941	Newfoundland to Iceland
ON 29		28 Oct-11 Nov 1941	Iceland to Newfoundland
SC 55		19 Nov-1 Dec 1941	Newfoundland to Iceland
ON 42		7-14 Dec 1941	Iceland to Newfoundland
SC 71		22-25 Feb 1942	Newfoundland to Iceland
HX 177		1–8 March 1942	Newfoundland to Northern Ireland
ON 77		18–25 March 1942	Northern Ireland to Newfoundland
HX 184		12–20 April 1942	Newfoundland to Northern Ireland
ON 91		2–11 May 1942	Northern Ireland to Newfoundland
HX 190	MOEF group A3	20–27 May 1942	Newfoundland to Northern Ireland
ON 102	MOEF group A3	10–21 June 1942	Northern Ireland to Newfoundland
HX 196	MOEF group A3	2–10 July 1942	Newfoundland to Northern Ireland
ON 114	MOEF group A3	20–30 July 1942	Northern Ireland to Newfoundland
SC 95	MOEF group A3	8-18 Aug 1942	Newfoundland to Northern Ireland
ON 125	MOEF group A3	29 Aug-7 Sept 1942	Northern Ireland to Newfoundland
SC 100	MOEF group A3	16-28 Sept 1942	Newfoundland to Northern Ireland
ON 135	MOEF group A3	3-15 Oct 1942	Northern Ireland to Newfoundland
Convoy SC 118	WLEF	27-31 Jan 1943	Halifax to Newfoundland
HX 226	MOEF group C3	14-17 Feb 1943	Newfoundland to Northern Ireland
ON 172	MOEF group C3	10–21 March 1943	Northern Ireland to Newfoundland
SC 124	MOEF group C3	26 March-6 April 1943	Newfoundland to Northern Ireland
ON 180	MOEF group C3	25 April-7 May 1943	Northern Ireland to Newfoundland
HX 238	MOEF group C3	13–21 May 1943	Newfoundland to Northern Ireland
ON 187		2–10 June 1943	Northern Ireland to Newfoundland
HX 244		20–29 June 1943	Newfoundland to Northern Ireland
ON 192		10–18 July 1943	Northern Ireland to Newfoundland
ONS 16		21-29 Aug 1943	Northern Ireland to Newfoundland
HX 255		8-15 Sept 1943	Newfoundland to Northern Ireland
ONS 19		27 Sept-9 Oct 1943	Northern Ireland to Newfoundland
HX 261		17-25 Oct 1943	Newfoundland to Northern Ireland
ON 210		7-17 Nov 1943	Northern Ireland to Newfoundland
ONS 22	WLEF	22 Nov 1943	Newfoundland to Halifax
ON 211	WLEF	26-29 Nov 1943	Newfoundland to Halifax

== Post-war service ==
After her return to the Royal Navy, Mayflower was laid up at Grangemouth. She was sold for scrapping on 20 September 1949 and broken up at Inverkeithing.
