= SS Rodina =

History
- Name: (Germany) Eisenach II (1922–1935); (Bulgaria) Rodina (1935–1941)
- Owner: Societe Commerciale Bulgare De Nav A. Vap
- Port of registry: Varna, Bulgaria
- Builder: Vulcan A. G.
- Yard number: 652
- Completed: September 1922
- Identification: LZDF
- Fate: Mined 19 September 1941

General characteristics
- Type: Cargo ship
- Tonnage: 4,159 GRT
- Length: 109.9 m (360 ft 7 in)
- Beam: 15.5 m (50 ft 10 in)
- Depth: 7.9 m (25 ft 11 in)
- Installed power: Triple expansion steam engine
- Propulsion: Screw propeller
- Speed: 10.5 knots (19.4 km/h; 12.1 mph)

SS Rodina was a Bulgarian cargo ship that struck a naval mine in the Black Sea 25 nautical miles (46 km) off Tsarevo, Bulgaria at 42°23′N 27°48′E.

== Construction ==
Rodina was constructed in 1922 at the Vulcan A. G. shipyard in Hamburg, Germany. The ship was 109.9 metres (360 ft 7 in) long, with a beam of 15.5 metres (50 ft 10 in) and a depth of 7.9 metres (25 ft 11 in). The ship was assessed at 4,159 GRT. She had a triple expansion steam engine driving a single screw propeller and the engine was rated at 260 nhp.

== Sinking ==
On 19 September 1941, Rodina struck a mine in the Black Sea 25 nautical miles (46 km) off Tsarevo, Bulgaria and sank to a depth of 40 metres (130 ft). There were no casualties.
