= German submarine U-74 (1940) =

German World War II submarine

Coordinates: 37°32′N 0°10′E

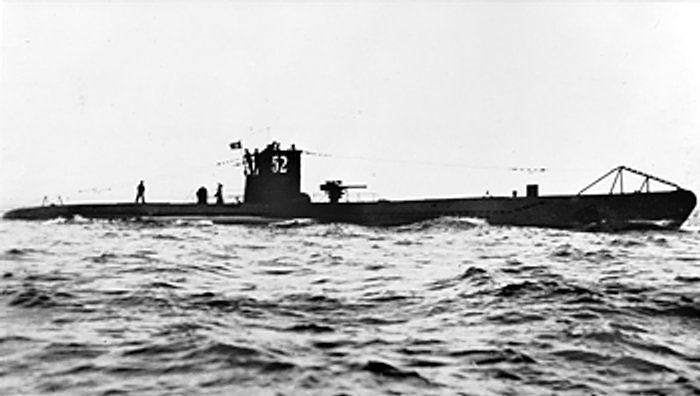
- U-52, a similar Type VIIB boat.

History

Nazi Germany
- Name: U-74
- Ordered: 2 June 1938
- Builder: Bremer Vulkan of Bremen-Vegesack
- Cost: 4,760,000 Reichsmark
- Yard number: 2
- Laid down: 5 November 1939
- Launched: 31 August 1940
- Commissioned: 31 October 1940
- Fate: Sunk, 2 May 1942

General characteristics
- Class & type: Type VIIB U-boat
- Displacement: 753 t (741 long tons) surfaced; 857 t (843 long tons) submerged
- Length: 66.50 m (218 ft 2 in) o/a; 48.80 m (160 ft 1 in) pressure hull
- Beam: 6.20 m (20 ft 4 in) o/a; 4.70 m (15 ft 5 in) pressure hull
- Draught: 4.74 m (15 ft 7 in)
- Installed power: 2,800–3,200 PS (2,100–2,400 kW; 2,800–3,200 bhp) (diesels); 750 PS (550 kW; 740 shp) (electric)
- Propulsion: 2 shafts; 2 × diesel engines; 2 × electric motors
- Speed: 17.9 knots (33.2 km/h; 20.6 mph) surfaced; 8 knots (15 km/h; 9.2 mph) submerged
- Range: 8,700 nmi (16,100 km; 10,000 mi) at 10 knots (19 km/h; 12 mph) surfaced; 90 nmi (170 km; 100 mi) at 4 knots (7.4 km/h; 4.6 mph) submerged
- Test depth: 230 m (750 ft); Calculated crush depth: 250–295 m (820–968 ft)
- Boats & landing craft carried: 1 inflatable rubber boat
- Complement: 4 officers, 40 to 56 enlisted
- Sensors & processing systems: FuMO 61 Hohentwiel U
- Armament: 5 × 53.3 cm (21 in) torpedo tubes (four bow, one stern); 14 × torpedoes or 26 TMA mines; 1 × 8.8 cm (3.46 in) deck gun (220 rounds); 1 × 2 cm (0.79 in) C/30 anti-aircraft gun

Service record
- Part of: 7th U-boat Flotilla; 31 October 1940 – 30 November 1941; 29th U-boat Flotilla; 1 December 1941 – 2 May 1942
- Identification codes: M 14 151
- Commanders: Kptlt. Eitel-Fredrich Kentrat; 31 October 1940 – 23 March 1942; Oblt.z.S. Karl Frederich; 24 March – 2 May 1942
- Operations: 8 patrols: 1st patrol: 5 March – 11 April 1941; 2nd patrol: 8 – 30 May 1941; 3rd patrol: 5 July – 12 August 1941; 4th patrol: 8 – 26 September 1941; 5th patrol: 22 October – 12 November 1941; 6th patrol: 9 – 24 December 1941; 7th patrol: 27 December 1941 – 8 January 1942; 8th patrol: 23 April – 2 May 1942
- Victories: 4 merchant ships sunk (24,694 GRT); 1 warship sunk (925 tons); 1 merchant ship damaged (123 GRT); 1 auxiliary warship damaged (11,402 GRT)

German submarine U-74 was a Type VIIB U-boat of Nazi Germany's Kriegsmarine during World War II.

Her keel was laid down on 5 November 1939, by Bremer Vulkan of Bremen-Vegesack, Germany as yard number 2. She was launched on 31 August 1940 and commissioned on 31 October, with Kapitänleutnant (Kptlt.) Eitel-Friedrich Kentrat in command until 23 March 1942, when he was succeeded by Oberleutnant zur See (Oblt.z.S.) Karl Friederich, who remained in charge until the U-boat's loss.

== Design ==
German Type VIIB submarines were preceded by the shorter Type VIIA submarines. U-74 had a displacement of 753 tonnes (741 long tons) when at the surface and 857 tonnes (843 long tons) while submerged. She had a total length of 66.50 m (218 ft 2 in), a pressure hull length of 48.80 m (160 ft 1 in), a beam of 6.20 m (20 ft 4 in), a height of 9.50 m (31 ft 2 in), and a draught of 4.74 m (15 ft 7 in). The submarine was powered by two MAN M 6 V 40/46 four-stroke, six-cylinder supercharged diesel engines producing a total of 2,800 to 3,200 metric horsepower (2,060 to 2,350 kW; 2,760 to 3,160 shp) for use while surfaced, two BBC GG UB 720/8 double-acting electric motors producing a total of 750 metric horsepower (550 kW; 740 shp) for use while submerged. She had two shafts and two 1.23 m (4 ft) propellers. The boat was capable of operating at depths of up to 230 metres (750 ft).

The submarine had a maximum surface speed of 17.9 knots (33.2 km/h; 20.6 mph) and a maximum submerged speed of 8 knots (15 km/h; 9.2 mph). When submerged, the boat could operate for 90 nautical miles (170 km; 100 mi) at 4 knots (7.4 km/h; 4.6 mph); when surfaced, she could travel 8,700 nautical miles (16,100 km; 10,000 mi) at 10 knots (19 km/h; 12 mph). U-74 was fitted with five 53.3 cm (21 in) torpedo tubes (four fitted at the bow and one at the stern), fourteen torpedoes, one 8.8 cm (3.46 in) SK C/35 naval gun, 220 rounds, and one 2 cm (0.79 in) anti-aircraft gun The boat had a complement of between forty-four and sixty.

== Service history ==
U-74 conducted eight patrols, sinking four ships totalling 25,619 GRT and damaging two others, totalling 11,525 GRT. She was a member of three wolfpacks.

=== First patrol ===
Having first moved from Kiel to the German controlled island of Helgoland (sometimes called 'Heligoland') and Bergen in Norway, U-74 departed for her first patrol on 5 March 1941. Her route took her through the gap between Iceland and the Faroe Islands and into the Atlantic Ocean, although one source - Uboat.net - gives her position as off the Belgian coast on 21 March. She sank Leonidas Z. Canbamis on 3 April southwest of Iceland, followed by damage to the armed merchant cruiser HMS Worcestershire close by on the same day. The auxiliary warship was fortunate because Kentrat, in U-74, had run out of torpedoes.

U-74 docked in St. Nazaire in occupied France on 11 April.

=== Second patrol ===
The boat's second foray was in a northwesterly direction, toward Greenland.

On 13 May she was assigned to group West in the area SSE of Cape Farewell, Groenland. On 16 May she comes across a group of American warships with 2 battleships and 3 destroyers.

On 21/22 May she was trying to attack convoy HX 126 but was driven off and attacked by two British warships; the vessels were the corvette HMS Verbena and the destroyer HMS Burnham. A mix of gunfire and depth charges (about 125 of them), were used. The damage inflicted was such that U-74 was obliged to return to France, but to Lorient, on the 30th. On 29 May, just before reaching the harbour she is fired upon with 6 fan of torpedoes by a British submarine, but she can evade the torpedoes.

==== U-74's involvement with the Bismarck ====
On 24 May 1941, the German battleship Bismarck and the heavy cruiser Prinz Eugen sank the British battlecruiser HMS Hood and damaged the accompanying battleship HMS Prince of Wales, beginning a three-day hunt that would involve nearly a hundred ships.

That concentration of ships was a very attractive set of targets; Kentrat was ordered to attack the British forces in this area. In the evening U-74 dived in order to listen for contact and detected another U-boat. By dawn on May 27, she surfaced; a hundred meters away, another U-boat appeared – U-556, commanded by Kapitänleutnant Wohlfarth.

Earlier, Flottenchef Admiral Lütjens requested that Befehlshaber der Unterseeboote (Commander-in-Chief for Submarines, Karl Dönitz) provide a U-boat to recover Bismarck's war diary. BdU had given the order to Wohlfarth, but U-556 was both out of torpedoes and very low on fuel. Using a megaphone, Wohlfarth now passed the order on to Kentrat. He accepted and proceeded toward Bismarck's last known position.

Bismarck was crippled and under fire from the battleships HMS Rodney and HMS King George V and the cruisers HMS Norfolk and HMS Dorsetshire. It was clear to her crew that she would not survive.

At 10:36 U-74 heard sinking sounds but Kentrat could not determine whether it was Bismarck or a British ship. He came to periscope depth and saw battleships and cruisers directly in front of him. He tried to maneuver into an attack position, but the weather was too bad and the seas too high to remain at periscope depth or to fire a torpedo. Wreckage and yellow life-jackets were visible.

After the British ships left, Kentrat surfaced amid debris and dead bodies. The sounds they had heard that morning was Bismarck's destruction. They searched but they could find no one alive until that evening when they came across a raft carrying three sailors, Georg Herzog, Otto Höntzsch, and Herbert Manthey. U-74 searched for another day but found no one else alive and was ordered to return to Lorient. On the return trip, the three survivors recovered from their shock and gave the first statements of Bismarck's loss.

=== Third patrol ===
For her third sortie, U-74 sank Kumasian on 5 August 1941 west of Ireland. She returned to St. Nazaire on the 12th.

=== Fourth patrol ===
Departing St. Nazaire on 8 September 1941, U-74 sank HMCS Levis about 120 nautical miles (220 km; 140 mi) east of Cape Farewell (Greenland) on 19 September 1941. This success was followed the next day when she sank the Catapult Armed Merchantman SS Empire Burton.

=== Fifth patrol ===
On 7 November 1941 U-74 sank MV Nottingham 550 nautical miles (1,020 km) southeast of Cape Farewell. This ship was on her maiden voyage, which was from Glasgow to New York. There were no survivors. The U-boat returned to St. Nazaire for the last time on 12 November 1941.

=== Sixth patrol ===
U-74's next patrol was into the Mediterranean. Leaving St. Nazaire on 9 December 1941, she had slipped past the heavily defended Straits of Gibraltar by the 16th. She entered La Spezia in Italy on 24 December.

=== Seventh patrol ===
The German submarine's first patrol in new surroundings was between Sicily and the Italian mainland and toward the British-controlled port of Alexandria in Egypt, which was reached on 3 January 1942. She returned to La Spezia on the eighth.

=== Eighth patrol and loss ===
Having been ordered to operate against Allied aircraft carriers at the western end of the Mediterranean, U-74 was diverted to search for U-573 (which had been damaged in an air attack), when she was bombed by a Lockheed Hudson of No. 233 Squadron RAF on 1 May 1942. That evening, she also had torpedoes fired at her by the British submarine HMS Unbroken off the southeastern Spanish coast. Both attacks were unsuccessful.

U-74 was detected and sunk by depth charges and 'Hedgehog' from the British destroyers HMS Wishart and HMS Wrestler east southeast of Cartagena in Spain on 2 May 1942.

47 men died; there were no survivors.

=== Wolfpacks ===
U-74 took part in three wolfpacks, namely:

- West (13 – 22 May 1941)
- Brandenburg (15 – 20 September 1941)
- Raubritter (1 – 6 November 1941)

== Previously recorded fate ==
U-74 was sunk by the British destroyers HMS Wishart and HMS Wrestler and a PBY Catalina of 202 Squadron east southeast of Cartagena in Spain on 2 May 1942.

== Summary of raiding history ==
Date	Ship	Nationality	Tonnage (Note: Merchant ship tonnages are in gross register tons. Military vessels are listed by tons displacement.)	Fate
11 March 1941	Frodi	Iceland	123	Damaged
3 April 1941	HMS Worcestershire	Royal Navy	11,402	Damaged
3 April 1941	Leonidas Z. Cambanis	Greece	4,274	Sunk
5 August 1941	Kumasian	United Kingdom	4,922	Sunk
19 September 1941	HMCS Lévis	Royal Canadian Navy	925	Sunk
20 September 1941	Empire Burton	United Kingdom	6,966	Sunk
7 November 1941	Nottingham	United Kingdom	8,532	Sunk

== See also ==
- Convoy SC 26
- Mediterranean U-boat Campaign (World War II)

== Bibliography ==
- Busch, Rainer; Röll, Hans-Joachim (1999). German U-boat commanders of World War II : a biographical dictionary. Translated by Brooks, Geoffrey. London, Annapolis, Md: Greenhill Books, Naval Institute Press. ISBN 1-55750-186-6.
- Busch, Rainer; Röll, Hans-Joachim (1999). Deutsche U-Boot-Verluste von September 1939 bis Mai 1945 [German U-boat losses from September 1939 to May 1945]. Der U-Boot-Krieg (in German). Vol. IV. Hamburg, Berlin, Bonn: Mittler. ISBN 3-8132-0514-2.
- Gröner, Erich; Jung, Dieter; Maass, Martin (1991). U-boats and Mine Warfare Vessels. German Warships 1815–1945. Vol. 2. Translated by Thomas, Keith; Magowan, Rachel. London: Conway Maritime Press. ISBN 0-85177-593-4.
- Gröner, Erich (1990). German Warships, 1815–1945. Conway Maritime Press.
- Hirschfeld, Wolfgang (1985). Feindfahrten. Logbuch eines U-Bootfunkers (in German). Munchen: Heyne. ISBN 3-453-02051-0.
- Kemp, Paul (1999). U-Boats Destroyed - German Submarine Losses in the World Wars. London: Arms & Armour. ISBN 1-85409-515-3.
