= List of shipwrecks in September 1941 =

The list of shipwrecks in September 1941 includes all ships sunk, foundered, grounded, or otherwise lost during September 1941.

== 1 September ==
List of shipwrecks: 1 September 1941
| Ship | State | Description |
|---|---|---|
| V 1512 Unitas 8 | Kriegsmarine | World War II: The vorpostenboot was severely damaged in a British air raid on Barfleur, Manche, France. |
| Zhitomir | Soviet Navy | World War II: The Zhitomir-class river monitor ran aground in the Dnepr River at Cherni. She was scuttled on 7 September to prevent capture. |

== 2 September ==
List of shipwrecks: 2 September 1941
| Ship | State | Description |
|---|---|---|
| HMS LCP(L) 59 | Royal Navy | The landing craft, personnel (large) was lost on this date. |
| HMS LCP(L) 71 | Royal Navy | The landing craft, personnel (large) was lost on this date. |
| VT-542 Meero | Soviet Navy | World War II: The requisitioned cargo ship (1,866 GRT) on a trip from Leningrad for Koivisto to evacuate Soviet troops, was torpedoed and sunk by Syöksy (Finnish Navy) off Björkö island (60°15′N 28°47′E). All crew were saved by Soviet Navy patrol boats. |
| Oslebhausen | Germany | World War II: The cargo ship struck a mine and sank in the North Sea off Obrestad, Norway. Also reported as torpedoed and sunk by British aircraft. |
| Peter Wessels | Germany | World War II: The salvage tug struck a mine and sank in the Ems. |

== 3 September ==
List of shipwrecks: 3 September 1941
| Ship | State | Description |
|---|---|---|
| Andrea Gritti | Italy | World War II: The cargo ship (6,338 GRT) travelling in a convoy from Naples for Tripoli with a cargo of fuel and ammunition, as well as some personnel from 101st Motorized Division "Trieste", was torpedoed and sunk in the Mediterranean Sea 25 nautical miles (46 km) south-southeast off Cape Spartivento (37°33′N 16°26′E) by 9 Fairey Swordfish aircraft of 830 Squadron, Fleet Air Arm. There were only two survivors of the 349 people on board. |
| Comandante Bafile | Italy | World War II: The 1,790 GRT cargo ship on a passage from Civitavecchia for Cagliari ran aground off Cape Comino, Sardinia and was wrecked. Attempts to raise the ship proved unsuccessful due to stormy weather, and she sank on 19 February 1942. |
| Fort Richepanse | United Kingdom | World War II: The cargo ship was torpedoed and sunk in the Atlantic Ocean (52°12′N 21°10′W) by U-567 (Kriegsmarine) with the loss of 41 of the 68 people on board. Survivors were rescued by ORP Garland and ORP Piorun (both Polish Navy). |
| Gustav | Soviet Navy | World War II: The requisitioned 107 GRT coaster (VT-575) was bombed and damaged at Kõiguste, Saaremaa by Luftwaffe aircraft and subsequently abandoned by her crew. Raised and repaired in 1942. |
| Kaganovich | Soviet Navy | World War II: The auxiliary river gunboat was scuttled on the Dnepr River near Kiev. |

== 4 September ==
List of shipwrecks: 4 September 1941
| Ship | State | Description |
|---|---|---|
| Abbas Combe | United Kingdom | World War II: The 489 GRT coaster on a passage from Liverpool for Watchet, was bombed and sunk in the Irish Sea 5 nautical miles (9.3 km) north-northwest off Bardsey Island, Caernarvonshire by Luftwaffe aircraft with the loss of four of her crew. |
| Tokustan Maru | Japan | The passenger ship collided with Koki Maru (Japan) in the La Perouse Strait and sank with the loss of seventeen of her crew. |

== 5 September ==
List of shipwrecks: 5 September 1941
| Ship | State | Description |
|---|---|---|
| Einvik | Norway | World War II: Convoy SC 41: The cargo ship straggled behind the convoy. She was torpedoed and sunk in the Atlantic Ocean (60°38′N 31°18′W) by U-501 (Kriegsmarine). Her 23 crew survived. |
| Isarco | Italy | World War II: The cargo ship was torpedoed and sunk in the Tyrrhenian Sea 28 nautical miles (52 km) south east of Ischia (42°48′N 9°58′E by HNLMS O 21 (Royal Netherlands Navy) with the loss of five or six of her crew. Twenty-two survivors were rescued by HNLMS O 21. |
| Jarlinn | Iceland | World War II: The 90-ton fishing trawler was torpedoed, blew up and sank in the Atlantic Ocean west of the Outer Hebrides, United Kingdom by U-141 (Kriegsmarine) with the loss of all eleven crew. |
| Maya | Italy | World War II: The tanker was torpedoed and damaged in the Dardanelles 6 nautical miles (11 km) off Tenedos, Turkey (39°43′N 25°57′E) by HMS Perseus (Royal Navy) and was beached. A crew member was killed. |
| Steel Seafarer | United States | World War II: The cargo ship was bombed and sunk in the Red Sea off Shadwan, Egypt (27°20′N 34°15′E) by Junkers Ju 88 aircraft of I and II Staffeln, Lehrgeschwader 1, Luftwaffe. Her 36 crew were rescued. |

== 6 September ==
List of shipwrecks: 6 September 1941
| Ship | State | Description |
|---|---|---|
| HMT Brora | Royal Navy | The naval trawler (545 GRT) ran aground onto rocks near the entrance to Obbe, on the island of South Harris, in the Outer Hebrides (57°46′N 7°02′W). She later capsized and was abandoned as a constructive total loss. There were no casualties. |
| Carla | Regia Marina | World War II: The anti-aircraft naval trawler was attacked in the Mediterranean Sea off La Spezia by HNLMS O 24 (Royal Netherlands Navy) and was driven ashore. Her 21 crew survived. |
| FR 5 | Kriegsmarine | World War II: The FR 1-class minesweeper was sunk by a mine in the Danube Estuary. She was raised and repaired. |
| FR 6 | Kriegsmarine | World War II: The FR 1-class minesweeper was sunk by a mine in the Danube Estuary. |
| King Erik | United Kingdom | World War II: The 114-foot (35 m), 227-ton fishing trawler was torpedoed, blew up and sank in the Atlantic Ocean off the coast of Iceland by U-141 (Kriegsmarine) with the loss of all fifteen crew. |
| M 4030 | Kriegsmarine | World War II: The auxiliary minesweeper struck a mine off Brest, Finistère, France. She returned to the port and sank there. |
| PK-404 | Soviet Navy | World War II: The MO-4-class patrol boat was shelled and sunk in the Baltic Sea off Kuivastu, Estonia by German shore-based artillery. |
| PK-407 | Soviet Navy | World War II: The MO-4-class patrol boat was shelled and sunk in the Baltic Sea off Kuivastu by German shore-based artillery. |
| HMT Strathborve | Royal Navy | World War II: The naval trawler (216 GRT) struck a mine and sank in the North Sea off the mouth of the Humber (53°33′N 0°18′E). 14 crew were killed or missing, and another died of his wounds the next day. |
| T-493 Khadzhibey | Soviet Navy | World War II: The auxiliary minesweeper as sunk by Luftwaffe aircraft at Odesa. |
| Trinidad | Panama | World War II : The coaster (434 GRT) was stopped, torpedoed and sunk in the Atlantic Ocean (46°06′N 17°04′W) by U-95 (Kriegsmarine). All ten crew were given time to abandon ship and survived. |

== 7 September ==
For scuttling of Soviet monitor Zhitomir on this date see the entry for 1 September.

List of shipwrecks: 7 September 1941
| Ship | State | Description |
|---|---|---|
| Bremse | Kriegsmarine | World War II: The artillery training ship was rammed and sunk in Hammerfjord, Norway by HMS Nigeria and HMS Aurora (both Royal Navy) with the loss of 160 of her 197 crews. |
| Duncarron | United Kingdom | World War II: The cargo ship was torpedoed and sunk in the North Sea 3 nautical miles (5.6 km) north of Sheringham, Norfolk by S-50 (Kriegsmarine) with the loss of nine of her crew. |
| Eikhaug | Norway | World War II: The cargo ship was torpedoed and sunk in the North Sea (53°05′52″N 1°20′50″E) by S-52 (Kriegsmarine) with the loss of fifteen of her nineteen crew. |
| Empire Gunner | United Kingdom | World War II: The cargo ship was bombed and sunk in St George's Channel (52°08′N 5°18′W) by Luftwaffe aircraft. |
| H 811 Maria Adriana | Kriegsmarine | The naval trawler was lost on this date. |
| Marcrest | United Kingdom | World War II: The cargo ship was bombed and sunk in the North Sea off Great Yarmouth, Norfolk by Dornier Do 217 aircraft of Kampfgeschwader 2, Luftwaffe. Her 38 crew were rescued. |
| Ophir II | United Kingdom | World War II: The fishing trawler struck a mine and sank in the North Sea 4 nautical miles (7.4 km) off the Humber Lightship ( Trinity House) with the loss of five of her crew. |
| SK-2 Pushkin | Soviet Navy | The auxiliary river guard ship was lost on this date. |
| Sirena | Italy | World War II: The coaster was torpedoed and sunk in the Mediterranean Sea 50 nautical miles (93 km) west of Benghazi, Libya by HMS Thunderbolt (Royal Navy) with the loss of seven of her nineteen crew. |
| Trsat | United Kingdom | World War II: The cargo ship was bombed and sunk in the North Sea 7 nautical miles (13 km) north east by east of Kinnaird Head, Aberdeenshire by Dornier Do 217 aircraft of Kampfgeshwader 2, Luftwaffe with the loss of three of her crew. |

== 8 September ==
List of shipwrecks: 8 September 1941
| Ship | State | Description |
|---|---|---|
| HMS Corfield | Royal Navy | World War II: The mine destructor ship (1,791 GRT) struck a mine and sank in the North Sea off Grimsby, Lincolnshire (53°27′N 0°19′E). There were no casualties. |
| Maggiore Baracca | Regia Marina | World War II: The Marconi-class submarine(1,191 GRT) was shelled, rammed, and sunk in the Atlantic Ocean (40°30′N 21°15′W) by HMS Croome (Royal Navy) with the loss of 28 of her 60 crew. The survivors were captured by HMS Croome. |

== 9 September ==
List of shipwrecks: 9 September 1941
| Ship | State | Description |
|---|---|---|
| Erna Oldendorf | Germany | The cargo ship collided with a tanker and sank in the Bay of Biscay off Saint-Nazaire, Finistère, France. |
| Empire Springbuck | United Kingdom | World War II: Convoy SC 42: The cargo ship straggled behind the convoy. She was torpedoed and sunk in the Atlantic Ocean off Cape Farewell, Greenland (61°38′N 40°40′W) by U-81 (Kriegsmarine) with the loss of all 39 crew. |
| Italo Balbo | Italy | World War II: The cargo ship was torpedoed and sunk in the Mediterranean Sea 10 nautical miles (19 km) west of Campo alle Serre, Elba (42°47′N 9°57′E) by HNLMS O 24 (Royal Netherlands Navy). Her 42 crew survived. |
| P-1 | Soviet Navy | The Pravda-class submarine was sighted off Hogland whilst on a voyage from Kronstadt to Hanko, Finland. No further trace, presumed foundered with the loss of all 54 crew. |
| Socony | United Kingdom | The tanker collided with Tongariro (United Kingdom) and sank in the Atlantic Ocean off the Azores, Portugal with the loss of two of her crew. |
| Trifels | Germany | World War II: The cargo ship was torpedoed and sunk in the English Channel off Boulogne, Pas-de-Calais, France by HM MTB 54 (Royal Navy). Her crew were rescued by V 202 Hermann Bösch and V 208 R. Walther Darré (both Kriegsmarine). |

== 10 September ==
List of shipwrecks: 10 September 1941
| Ship | State | Description |
|---|---|---|
| Baron Pentland | United Kingdom | World War II: Convoy SC 42: The cargo ship was torpedoed and damaged in the Atlantic Ocean by U-652 (Kriegsmarine). She was abandoned with the loss of two of her 41 crew. Survivors were rescued by HMCS Orillia (Royal Canadian Navy). The abandoned ship stayed afloat primarily because of her load of lumber until she was torpedoed and sunk at 58°15′N 40°36′W by U-372 (Kriegsmarine) on 19 September. |
| HMT Christine Rose | Royal Navy | The naval trawler ran aground on Knap Rock, Argyllshire and was wrecked with the loss of a crew member. |
| Empire Hudson | United Kingdom | World War II: Convoy SC 42: The CAM ship was torpedoed and sunk in the Atlantic Ocean (61°28′N 40°51′W) by U-82 (Kriegsmarine) with the loss of four of her crew. |
| Harry K. Fooks | United States | The schooner foundered off Cape May, New Jersey. |
| M 1102 H.A.W. Muller | Kriegsmarine | World War II: The auxiliary minesweeper was torpedoed and sunk in the North Sea (58°08′N 6°38′E) by Royal Air Force aircraft with the loss of fifteen of her 37 crew. Survivors were rescued by M 253 (Kriegsmarine. |
| Julius Hugo Stinnes 27 | Germany | World War II: The cargo ship struck a mine and sank in the Baltic Sea off Kolberg. |
| Mariann | Latvia | World War II: The cargo ship struck a mine and sank in the Baltic Sea off the coast of Germany. |
| Marken | Netherlands | World War II: The tanker was torpedoed and sunk in the Atlantic Ocean (1°36′N 36°55′W) by U-111 (Kriegsmarine). Her 37 crew were rescued by a Spanish merchant ship. |
| Muneric | United Kingdom | World War II: Convoy SC 42: The cargo ship was torpedoed and sunk in the Atlantic Ocean (61°38′N 40°40′W) by U-432 (Kriegsmarine) with the loss of all 63 people on board. |
| Murefte | United Kingdom | World War II: The ferry (691 GRT) was torpedoed and sunk in the Mediterranean Sea off Lebanon (33°27′N 34°54′E) by Topazio (Regia Marina) with the loss of a crew member. Survivors were rescued by Talodi (Egypt). |
| Norburg | Germany | World War II: The cargo ship was torpedoed and sunk at Heraklion, Greece by HMS Torbay (Royal Navy). She was later salvaged. |
| Sally Mærsk | United Kingdom | World War II: Convoy SC 42: The cargo ship straggled behind the convoy. She was torpedoed and sunk in the Atlantic Ocean (61°40′N 40°30′W) by U-81 (Kriegsmarine). Her 34 crew were rescued by HMCS Kenogami (Royal Canadian Navy). |
| Stargard | Norway | World War II: Convoy SC 42: The cargo ship was torpedoed and sunk in the Atlantic Ocean (61°30′N 40°30′W) by U-432 (Kriegsmarine) with the loss of two of her seventeen crew. Survivors were rescued by Regin (Norway) and one of the convoy's escorts. |
| Svam I | Italy | World War II: The coaster was torpedoed and sunk in the Gulf of Sirte by HMS Thunderbolt (Royal Navy). A crew member was killed. |
| Tahchee | United Kingdom | World War II: Convoy SC 42: The tanker was torpedoed and damaged in the Atlantic Ocean (61°15′N 41°05′W) by U-652 (Kriegsmarine). The crew abandoned the burning ship but later reboarded her and extinguished the fire. Tahchee was taken in tow by HMCS Orillia (Royal Canadian Navy) and arrived at Reykjavík, Iceland on 15 September. She was later repaired, and returned to service in November 1942. |
| Thistleglen | United Kingdom | World War II: Convoy SC 42: The cargo ship was torpedoed and sunk in the Atlantic Ocean (61°59′N 39°46′W) by U-85 (Kriegsmarine) with the loss of three of her 46 crew. Survivors were rescued by Lorient (United Kingdom) |
| U-501 | Kriegsmarine | World War II: The Type IXC submarine was depth charged and damaged in the Denmark Strait (62°50′N 37°50′W) by HMCS Chambly (Royal Canadian Navy). She surfaced and surrendered to HMCS Moose Jaw (Royal Canadian Navy), which put a party on board to retrieve secret documents. U-501 sank with the loss of eleven of her 46 crew and a crew member from HMCS Moose Jaw. |
| Winterswijk | Netherlands | World War II: Convoy SC 42: The cargo ship was torpedoed and sunk in the Atlantic Ocean (61°38′N 40°40′W) by U-432 (Kriegsmarine) with the loss of twenty of her 33 crew. Survivors were rescued by one of the escorting corvettes. |

== 11 September ==
List of shipwrecks: 11 September 1941
| Ship | State | Description |
|---|---|---|
| Alfredo Oriani | Italy | World War II: The 3,059 GRT cargo ship on a trip from Brindisi for Benghasi, was bombed and damaged in the Mediterranean Sea (35°50′N 20°30′E) by Bristol Blenheim bombers of No. 105 Squadron RAF. She sank on 13 September 180 nautical miles (330 km) north of Benghasi (35°50′N 20°16′E). Two of her 50 crew died. |
| Berury | United Kingdom | World War II: Convoy SC 42: The cargo ship was torpedoed and damaged in the Atlantic Ocean (62°40′N 38°50′W) by U-207) (Kriegsmarine) with the loss of one of her 42 crew. Survivors were rescued by HMCS Kenogami and HMCS Moose Jaw (both Royal Canadian Navy). Berury was scuttled by a Royal Navy ship. |
| Bulysses | United Kingdom | World War II: Convoy SC 42: The tanker was torpedoed and sunk in the Atlantic Ocean (62°40′N 38°50′W) by U-82 (Kriegsmarine) with the loss of one of her 61 crew. Survivors were rescued by Wisla (Poland). |
| Cormead | United Kingdom | The collier was bombed and damaged by Luftwaffe aircraft off Cromer, Norfolk. She was subsequently repaired and returned to service. |
| Empire Crossbill | United Kingdom | World War II: Convoy SC 42: The cargo ship was torpedoed and sunk in the Atlantic Ocean (63°14′N 37°12′W) by U-81 (Kriegsmarine), with the loss of all 49 people on board. |
| Garm | Sweden | World War II: Convoy SC 42: The cargo ship was torpedoed and sunk in the Atlantic Ocean (63°02′N 37°51′W) by U-432 (Kriegsmarine) with the loss of six of her twenty crew. Survivors were rescued by Bestum (Norway). |
| Gypsum Queen | United Kingdom | World War II: Convoy SC 42: The cargo ship was torpedoed and sunk in the Atlantic Ocean (63°05′N 37°50′W) by U-82 (Kriegsmarine) with the loss of ten of her 36 crew. Survivors were rescued by Vestland (Norway). |
| Livorno | Kriegsmarine | World War II: The transport ship was torpedoed and sunk in the Mediterranean Sea off Bougie, Algeria (31°58′N 19°23′E) by HMS Thunderbolt (Royal Navy). |
| Montana | Panama | World War II: The cargo ship was torpedoed and sunk in the Atlantic Ocean 400 nautical miles (740 km) off Cape Farewell, Greenland (63°40′N 35°50′W) by U-105 (Kriegsmarine) with the loss of eighteen of her 26 crew. |
| No. 1307 and No. 1308 | Soviet Navy | The KM-II-class minesweepers were lost on this date. |
| PiLB 202 | Kriegsmarine | The PiLB 40 type landing craft was lost on this date. |
| Sadko | Soviet Union | The icebreaker ran aground in the Kara Sea and sank. Her crew were rescued by Lenin (Soviet Union). |
| Scania | Sweden | World War II: Convoy SC 42: The cargo ship was torpedoed and damaged in the Atlantic Ocean (63°05′N 37°50′W) by U-82 (Kriegsmarine). She straggled behind the convoy and was torpedoed and sunk by U-202 (Kriegsmarine. Her 24 crew were rescued. |
| Stonepool | United Kingdom | World War II: Convoy SC 42: The cargo ship was torpedoed and sunk in the Atlantic Ocean (63°05′N 37°50′W) by U-207) (Kriegsmarine) with the loss of 42 of her 49 crew. Survivors were rescued by HMCS Kenogami (Royal Canadian Navy) |
| U-207 | Kriegsmarine | World War II: The Type VIIC submarine (1,070 GRT) was depth charged and sunk in the Strait of Denmark (63°59′N 34°48′W) by HMS Leamington and HMS Veteran (both Royal Navy) with the loss of all 41 crew. |

== 12 September ==
List of shipwrecks: 12 September 1941
| Ship | State | Description |
|---|---|---|
| Awatea | United Kingdom | The passenger ship was ramed by the tanker M. E. Lombardi (United States) off Victoria, British Columbia, Canada and was damaged. She put back to Victoria for repairs. |
| Caffaro | Italy | World War II: The cargo ship (6,476 GRT) travelling in a convoy from Naples for Tripoli with a cargo of ammunition, military supplies and vehicles, as well as 170 German and 17 Italian military personnel on board, was bombed, damaged and immobilized in the Mediterranean Sea about 105 nautical miles (194 km) north west of Tripoli (34°14′N 11°54′E) by 8 Bristol Blenheim bombers of No. 105 Squadron RAF. The cargo of ammunition soon caught fire, and the ship had to be abandoned. The ship soon sank, after the ammunition in the aft hold exploded breaking off the ship's keel. 1 German soldiers and one crew were killed in the attack, and one German officer later died of wounds. |
| T-402 Minrep | Soviet Navy | World War II: The Fugas-class minesweeper (500 GRT) struck a German mine outside of Feodosia harbor, and sank with the loss of 61 of the 77 people aboard. |
| Ottar Jarl | Norway | World War II: The cargo ship (1,459 GRT) on a trip from Kirkenes for Germany was torpedoed and sunk in Tanafjord (70°57′N 29°00′E) by Shch-422 (Soviet Navy) with the loss of a crew member. |
| PK-121 | Soviet Navy | World War II: The MO-4-class patrol vessel was bombed and sunk in the Black Sea off Tendra Spit by Luftwaffe aircraft. |
| Smolensk | Soviet Navy | World War II: The Smolensk-class river monitor was scuttled in the Desna River near Chernigov to avoid capture by the Germans. |
| Tai Koo | United Kingdom | World War II: The 688 GRT tug struck a mine while carrying out salvage operations at the port of Massawa, and sank with the loss of 26 of the 63 people on board, including Commander Joseph Stenhouse (16°45′N 40°05′E). |
| Tauri | Finland | World War II: The cargo ship was bombed and sunk off Moster, Norway by Fleet Air Arm aircraft. She was raised in 1953, and broken up in Stavanger, Norway. |

== 13 September ==
List of shipwrecks: 13 September 1941
| Ship | State | Description |
|---|---|---|
| Barøy | Norway | World War II: The 424 GRT passenger ship on a passage from Trondheim for Narvik with 105 passengers, was torpedoed and sunk in the Vestfjord off Bremneset by a Fairey Albacore aircraft of 817 Squadron, Fleet Air Arm. There were only 19 survivors saved by Skjerstad (Norway). |
| Bloomfield | United Kingdom | World War II: The cargo ship was bombed and sunk in the Atlantic Ocean (61°50′N 6°00′W) by Luftwaffe aircraft. There were no casualties. |
| Hiiula | Soviet Navy | World War II: The requisitioned 330 GRT coaster (VT-594) was sunk while anchored at Kärdla, Hiiumaa by Luftwaffe aircraft. |
| Ilmarinen | Finnish Navy | World War II: Operation Nordwind: The coastal defence ship struck a mine and sank in the Baltic Sea off Utö with the loss of 271 of her 403 crew. The Finnish Environment Institute and the Finnish Navy removed 60,000 of 100,000 liters of oil from the wreck between 14 July and 24 July, 2026. |
| Richard With | Norway | World War II: The 905 GRT cargo-passenger ship on a trip from Honningsvåg for Hammerfest was torpedoed and sunk in the Norwegian Sea south of Rolvsøya (70°50′N 23°57′E) by HMS Tigris (Royal Navy) with the loss of 101 lives. |

== 14 September ==
List of shipwrecks: 14 September 1941
| Ship | State | Description |
|---|---|---|
| M-1707 Lunenberg | Kriegsmarine | World War II: The auxiliary minesweeper was torpedoed and sunk in the Baltic Sea by TK-104 (Soviet Navy) after she had been abandoned due to damage from mines and coastal artillery batteries. |
| Moldavia | Soviet Union | World War II: The 1,190 GRT converted hospital ship was bombed and heavily damaged in the Black Sea off Tendra Spit (46°20′N 31°32′E) by Luftwaffe aircraft and subsequently beached and burnt out. The vessel was raised in March 1946 and scrapped in 1947. |
| No. 84 | Soviet Navy | The G-5-class motor torpedo boat was lost on this date. |
| Nicolò Odero | Italy | World War II: The 6,003 GRT cargo ship travelling in a convoy from Naples for Tripoli with a cargo of ammunition, was bombed and set afire in the Mediterranean Sea 30 nautical miles (56 km) off Tripoli (32°51′N 12°18′E) by 7 Vickers Wellington bombers of No. 38 Squadron RAF. She was beached 6 nautical miles (11 km) east from Zuara, but her cargo continued burning and exploded the next day and she was subsequently declared a total loss. There were twenty casualties, and 285 survivors. |
| Petropavlovsk | Soviet Navy | World War II: The Admiral Hipper-class cruiser was sunk at Leningrad by German artillery. She was raised on 17 September, repaired and returned to service. |
| R-60, R-61, and R-62 | Kriegsmarine | World War II: The Type R-41 minesweepers were obliterated by onboard explosions with the loss of all hands while in Helsinki harbur. Sabotage was suspected, but never proven. |

== 15 September ==
List of shipwrecks: 15 September 1941
| Ship | State | Description |
|---|---|---|
| Atlantic Cock | United Kingdom | World War II: The tug struck a mine in the Clyde at Dalmuir, Renfrewshire and was beached. She was refloated on 11 October. |
| Birtley | United Kingdom | World War II: The cargo ship struck a mine and was damaged in the North Sea (53°06′00″N 1°16′30″E). She sank the next day at 53°03′N 1°18′E). Three of her crew were lost. The wreck was dispersed by explosives between July and December 1943. |
| Chipka | Bulgaria | World War II: The cargo ship struck a mine and sank in the Black Sea off Varna (43°17′N 28°05′E). Two of her crew were killed and two were wounded. She was refloated in July 1952, repaired and returned to service. |
| Daru | United Kingdom | World War II: The cargo ship was bombed and sunk in the North Sea (51°56′30″N 5°58′00″W) by Luftwaffe aircraft. There were no casualties. |
| Empire Eland | United Kingdom | World War II: Convoy ON 14: The Design 1019 cargo ship was torpedoed and sunk in the Atlantic Ocean (54°09′N 29°55′W) by U-94 (Kriegsmarine) with the loss of all 37 crew. |
| Hanseat | Germany | The coaster ran aground on Rügen and was wrecked. |
| Flying Kite | United Kingdom | World War II: The tug struck a mine and sank in the Clyde at Dalmuir with the loss of five of her eight crew. |
| M 3823 De Verwachting | Kriegsmarine | Worle War II: The auxiliary minesweeper was sunk at Le Havre, Seine-Inférieure, France in a British air raid. She was raised and repaired. |
| Newbury | United Kingdom | World War II: Convoy ON 14: The cargo ship straggled behind the convoy. She was torpedoed and sunk in the Atlantic Ocean (54°39′N 28°04′W) by U-94 (Kriegsmarine) with the loss of all 49 crew. |
| Pegasus | Greece | World War II: Convoy ON 14: The cargo ship straggled behind the convoy. She was torpedoed and sunk in the Atlantic Ocean (54°40′N 29°50′W) by U-94 (Kriegsmarine) with the loss of sixteen of her 29 crew. Survivors were rescued by a Swedish merchant ship. |
| Pontfield | Belgium | World War II: The tanker struck a mine in the North Sea (52°03′00″N 1°20′30″E) and broke in two. The bow section sank, the stern section was beached at Salt End, Yorkshire, United Kingdom. Later repaired with a new bow section constructed and returned to service. |
| Sovetskaya Bessarabia | Soviet Union | The passenger ship was wrecked at Tenderovskaya. |

== 16 September ==
List of shipwrecks: 16 September 1941
| Ship | State | Description |
|---|---|---|
| Filuccio | Italy | World War II: the coastal tanker was sunk in the Mediterranean Sea off the coast of Libya by a crashing aircraft. |
| Jedmoor | United Kingdom | World War II: Convoy SC 42: The cargo ship was torpedoed and sunk in the Atlantic Ocean (approximately 59°N 10°W) by U-98 (Kriegsmarine) with the loss of 31 of her 36 crew. Survivors were rescued by Campus (United Kingdom) and Knoll (Norway). |
| No. 12 | Soviet Navy | The KM-2 Type motor launch was lost on this date. |
| TShch-81 | Soviet Navy | The auxiliary minesweeper was bombed and sunk by Luftwaffe aircraft northwest of Paldiski (58°36′N 23°25′E). |
| MO-405 | Soviet Navy | The MO-2-class patrol boat was lost on this date. |
| No. 1306, No. 1309, No. 1310, and No. 1318 | Soviet Navy | The KM-II-class minesweepers were lost on this date. |
| V 5107 Sturm | Kriegsmarine | The vorpostenboot collided with Carl Rehder (Germany) and sank off the coast of Norway. |
| Yarrawonga | Sweden | World War II: The cargo ship was bombed and sunk at Hamburg, Germany by Royal Air Force aircraft. She was later raised, repaired and returned to service. |
| William Downes | United Kingdom | The fishing trawler sank off Rosslare Harbour, County Wexford, Ireland after a collision. Her crew were rescued. |

== 17 September ==
List of shipwrecks: 17 September 1941
| Ship | State | Description |
|---|---|---|
| BOP No. 117 | Soviet Union | The barge was driven ashore in Lake Ladoga with the loss of 150 of the 800 people on board. Survivors were rescued by TSh-122 (Soviet Navy) |
| HSwMS Göteborg | Royal Swedish Navy | Hårsfjärden disaster: The Goteborg-class destroyer was sunk by an explosion onboard HSwMS Klas Uggla (Royal Swedish Navy) in Hårsfjärden. She was raised, repaired, and returned to service in 1943. |
| Johann Wessels | Germany | World War II: The cargo ship struck a mine and sank in Norwegian waters, or was attacked by British aircraft and sunk north west of Juist. |
| HSwMS Klas Horn | Royal Swedish Navy | Hårsfjärden disaster: The Klas-class destroyer was sunk by an explosion onboard HSwMS Klas Uggla (Royal Swedish Navy) in Hårsfjärden with the loss of fifteen of her crew. She was raised, repaired using parts from HSwMS Klas Ugga (Royal Swedish Navy), and returned to service 1943. |
| HSwMS Klas Uggla | Royal Swedish Navy | Hårsfjärden disaster: The Klas-class destroyer was sunk by an explosion in Hårsfjärden. Five of her crew were killed. |
| Kоivastо | Soviet Navy | World War II: The requisitioned 55 GRT coaster (VT-595) was sunk while anchored at Triigi, Saaremaa by Luftwaffe aircraft. Raised in November 1941 by the Germans, and returned to service in 1942. |
| M 1707 Luneburg | Kriegsmarine | World War II: The mineweeping naval trawler struck a mine in the Baltic Sea off Saaremaa and was subsequently sunk by Soviet artillery. |
| No. 122 Som | Soviet Navy | World War II: The auxiliary minesweeper was sunk in the Lake Ladoga by Luftwaffe aircraft with the loss of thirteen of her crew. |
| P-1 | Soviet Navy | World War II: The Pravda-class submarine struck a mine and sank near Hanko, Finland. |
| SK-6 Voroshilov | Soviet Navy | The auxiliary river guard ship was lost on this date. |
| Tai Koo | Hong Kong | The tug was lost to an Italian mine off Massawa, Eritrea; four crewmembers were killed. The approaches to the port of Massawa had been mined by Ostia (Regia Marina) in June 1940. |
| Teddington | United Kingdom | World War II: The cargo ship was torpedoed and damaged in the North Sea (54°03′N 1°35′E) by S 51 (Kriegsmarine). She was taken in tow, but came ashore the next day at Overstrand, Norfolk. Her crew were rescued. She broke her back and was a total loss. The wreck was dispersed by explosives in July 1954. |
| Tetela | United Kingdom | World War II: The cargo ship was torpedoed and damaged in the North Sea (54°04′N 1°35′E) by S 52 (Kriegsmarine). She was taken in tow and beached on the Haile Sand Flat. She was refloated the next day and taken to Hull, Yorkshire. |
| TKA-34 | Soviet Navy | The G-5-class motor torpedo boat damaged during an air raid on 7 September, was scuttled by her crew at Kõiguste, Saaremaa. |
| TKA-74 | Soviet Navy | The G-5-class motor torpedo boat damaged during an air raid on 7 September, was scuttled by her crew at Kõiguste, Saaremaa. |
| Triton | Soviet Navy | World War II: The requisitioned 183 GRT coaster (VT-591) was sunk while anchored at Triigi, Saaremaa by Luftwaffe aircraft. |
| No. 1240 | Soviet Union | The barge was driven ashore and wrecked in Lake Ladoga with the loss of all 460 people on board. |

== 18 September ==
List of shipwrecks: 18 September 1941
| Ship | State | Description |
|---|---|---|
| Beloruss | Soviet Navy | World War II: The Trudovoy-class gunboat was sunk by German field artillery on the Desna River at Kiev. |
| Flyagin | Soviet Navy | World War II: The Project SB-37-class monitor was scuttled on the Dnepr River near Kiev. |
| Kakhovka | Soviet Navy | World War II: The incomplete Project SB-37-class monitor/Vidlista-class river monitor was scuttled at the 300 Yard, Kiev to avoid capture by the Germans. |
| Levachev | Soviet Navy | World War II: The Project SB-37-class monitor was scuttled on the Dnepr River near Kiev. |
| Martynov | Soviet Navy | World War II: The Project SB-37-class monitor was scuttled on the Konskaya River at Blagoveshchensk. |
| Neptunia | Italy | World War II: The troopship was torpedoed and sunk in the Mediterranean Sea off Misrata, Libya (33°02′N 14°42′E) by HMS Upholder (Royal Navy). Neptunia was on a voyage from Taranto to Tripoli, Libya. |
| Oceania | Italy | World War II: The troopship was torpedoed and sunk in the Mediterranean Sea off Tripoli, Libya (33°02′N 14°42′E) by HMS Upholder (Royal Navy). Oceana was on a voyage from Taranto to Tripoli. |
| Rostovtsev | Soviet Navy | World War II: The Project SB-37-class monitor was scuttled on the Dnepr River near Kiev. Raised in 1945, repaired and returned to service as a training ship. |
| Smolnyy | Soviet Navy | The auxiliary river gunboat was sunk on this date. |
| U-4 | Soviet Navy | The Sh-4-class motor torpedo boat was bombed and heavily damaged by Luftwaffe aircraft off Svobodnyi Port (Yahorlyk Kut), and subsequently sunk. |
| Vitebsk | Soviet Navy | World War II: The Zhitomar-class river monitor was scuttled near Kiev to avoid capture by the Germans. She was refloated in August 1944, and subsequently scrapped. |
| No. 752 | Soviet Union | The barge foundered in Lake Ladoga whilst under tow by the tug Orel (Soviet Union). Of the 1,200 to 1,500 people on board, only 182 were rescued. |

== 19 September ==
List of shipwrecks: 19 September 1941
| Ship | State | Description |
|---|---|---|
| Bradglen | United Kingdom | World War II: The cargo ship struck a mine and sank in the Thames Estuary (51°31′02″N 1°03′24″E) with the loss of eight of her crew. |
| Bunte Kuh | Germany | World War II: The fishing trawler struck a mine and sank in the Kattegat. |
| City of Waterford | Ireland | World War II: Convoy OG 74: The cargo ship collided with Thames (Netherlands) and sank in the Atlantic Ocean. HMS Deptford (Royal Navy) rescued her 23 crew and transferred them to Walmer Castle (United Kingdom). Five of the survivors were killed when Walmer Castle was sunk. |
| RFA Denbydale | Royal Fleet Auxiliary | World War II: The Dale-class oiler was severely damaged at Gibraltar by a limpet mine placed by a manned torpedo launched from Scirè (Regia Marina). She was thereafter used as a fuelling hulk at Gibraltar until 1955. |
| Durham | United Kingdom | World War II: The tanker was damaged at Gibraltar by a limpet mine placed by a manned torpedo launched from Scirè (Regia Marina) and was beached. She was subsequently towed to Falmouth, Cornwall for repairs. |
| Fiona Shell | United Kingdom | World War II: The tanker was damaged at Gibraltar by a limpet mine placed by a manned torpedo launched from Scirè (Regia Marina). |
| Glen Alva | United Kingdom | World War II: The fishing trawler struck a mine and sank in the Thames Estuary off Southend, Essex, with the loss of both crew. |
| HMCS Levis | Royal Canadian Navy | HMCS Levis World War II: Convoy SC 44: The Flower-class corvette was torpedoed and damaged in the Atlantic Ocean off Cape Farewell, Greenland (60°07′N 38°37′W) by U-74 (Kriegsmarine) with the loss of eighteen of her 109 crew. Although she was taken in tow, she later capsized and sank. Survivors were rescued by HMCS Agassiz and HMCS Mayflower (both Royal Canadian Navy). |
| Murefte | Turkey | The ferry was shelled and sunk off Beirut, Lebanon (33°12′N 34°35′E) by Topasio (Regia Marina). |
| Prestatyn Rose | United Kingdom | World War II: The cargo ship was bombed and damaged in the North Sea 3 nautical miles (5.6 km) off Harwich, Essex (51°52′25″N 1°35′45″E) and was beached at Harwich. She was refloated on 28 September. |
| Rodina | Bulgaria | World War II: The cargo ship struck a mine and sank in the Black Sea 25 nautical miles (46 km) off Tsarevo (42°23′N 27°48′E). Three Bulgarian crewmen and a German radio operator were killed. |
| VT-585 Rudolf | Soviet Navy | World War II: The requisitioned coaster (90 GRT) was bombed and damaged in Matsalu Bay by Luftwaffe aircraft, and subsequently abandoned by her crew. There were no casualties. |
| Udarny | Soviet Navy | World War II: The Project SB-12-class monitor was sunk in the Black Sea off Tendra Island by Luftwaffe aircraft with the loss of 56 of her crew. |

== 20 September ==
List of shipwrecks: 20 September 1941
| Ship | State | Description |
|---|---|---|
| Baltallinn | United Kingdom | World War II: Convoy OG 74: The cargo ship was torpedoed and sunk in the Atlantic Ocean (48°07′N 22°07′W) by U-124 (Kriegsmarine) with the loss of seven of her 38 crew. Walmer Castle (United Kingdom) rescued the survivors. Eleven of them died when Walmer Castle was sunk. |
| Barbro | Norway | World War II: Convoy SC 44: The tanker was torpedoed and sunk in the Atlantic Ocean (61°30′N 35°07′W) by U-552 (Kriegsmarine) with the loss of all 34 crew. |
| Cingalese Prince | United Kingdom | World War II: The cargo ship was torpedoed and sunk in the Atlantic Ocean (2°00′S 25°30′W) by U-111 (Kriegsmarine) with the loss of 57 of her 77 crew. Survivors were rescued by Castillo Montjuich (Spain), HMS Londonderry and HMS Weston (both Royal Navy). |
| Empire Burton | United Kingdom | World War II: Convoy SC 44: The CAM ship was torpedoed and sunk in the Atlantic Ocean east of Cape Farewell, Greenland (61°34′N 35°05′W) by U-74 (Kriegsmarine) with the loss of two of her 60 crew. Survivors were rescued by HMS Honeysuckle (Royal Navy). |
| Empire Moat | United Kingdom | World War II: Convoy OG 74: The cargo ship was torpedoed and damaged in the Atlantic Ocean 800 nautical miles (1,500 km) west of Ouessant, Finistère, France (48°07′N 22°07′W) by U-124 (Kriegsmarine). The ship was abandoned, and was presumed to have sunk later. Walmer Castle (United Kingdom) rescued her 30 crew. |
| HMT Marconi | Royal Navy | The naval trawler sank in the North Sea off Harwich, Essex. |
| Maria | Soviet Navy | World War II: The requisitioned 1,485 GRT cargo ship (VT-544) was bombed and sunk during a massive Luftwaffe raid on Kronstadt. She was raised June 1944, repaired, and returned to service June 1945. |
| Metz | Germany | World War II: The coaster was bombed and sunk in the North Sea off Vlaardingen, South Holland, Netherlands. |
| Monselet | France | World War II: The cargo ship was bombed and sunk in the Mediterranean Sea off Sfax, Tunisia by Royal Air Force aircraft. |
| TKA-91 | Soviet Navy | The G-5-class motor torpedo boat was shelled, set afire and sunk off Sõmeri by Arado Ar 95 plane of Seeaufklärungsgruppe 125. |
| Pink Star | Panama | World War II: Convoy SC 44: The cargo ship was torpedoed and sunk in the Atlantic Ocean (61°36′N 35°07′W) by U-552 (Kriegsmarine) with the loss of thirteen of her 35 crew. |
| Portsdown | United Kingdom | World War II: The paddle ferry struck a mine and sank in the Solent with the loss of 23 lives. |
| T. J. Williams | United Kingdom | World War II: Convoy SC 44: The tanker was torpedoed and sunk in the Atlantic Ocean east north east of Cape Farewell (61°36′N 35°07′W) by U-552 (Kriegsmarine) with the loss of seventeen of her 39 crew. Survivors were rescued by HMS Honeysuckle (Royal Navy). |
| Vulkan | Germany | World War II: The tug struck a mine and sank in the English Channel off Le Havre, Seine-Inférieure, France with the loss of two of her crew. |

== 21 September ==
List of shipwrecks: 21 September 1941
| Ship | State | Description |
|---|---|---|
| Antar | Palestine | World War II: The tanker (385 GRT) was shelled and set on fire in the Mediterranean Sea (33°57′N 35°04′E) off Beirut, Lebanon by Ascianghi (Regia Marina). All 15 crew survived and were picked up by a Lebanese fishing vessel. She was taken in tow by HMS Southern Isle (Royal Navy) but sank two days later. |
| Barta | Soviet Union | World War II: The cargo ship was damaged by Luftwaffe aircraft and was beached near the Leningrad Port Canal. She was raised on 31 March 1944 and either scrapped, or returned to service, in 1945. |
| Frunze | Soviet Navy | World War II: The destroyer was bombed and sunk in the Black Sea off Tendra Spit (46°10′00″N 31°02′07″E) by Ju 87B aircraft of Sturzkampfgeschwader 77, Luftwaffe with the loss of 160 of the 238 people aboard. |
| Kolkhoznik | Soviet Navy | The 210 tons auxiliary minelayer was bombed and sunk by Luftwaffe aircraft off Tendra Spit. |
| Krasnaya Armenia | Soviet Navy | World War II: The Elpidifor-class gunboat was bombed and sunk by Luftwaffe aircraft off Tendra Spit. |
| Lissa | United Kingdom | World War II: Convoy OG 74: The cargo ship was torpedoed and sunk in the Atlantic Ocean (approximately 47°N 22°W) by U-201 (Kriegsmarine) with the loss of all 26 crew. |
| OP-8 | Soviet Navy | World War II: The tug was bombed and sunk in the Black Sea off Tendra Island (46°17′03″N 31°30′05″E) by Junkers Ju 87 aircraft of Sturzkampfgeschwader 77, Luftwaffe, while trying to rescue the survivors of Frunze (Soviet Navy) with a loss of 51 lives. |
| R-158 | Kriegsmarine | The Type R-151 minesweeper was damaged in a collision with NT 05 Togo (Kriegsmarine) off Hammerfest and was beached. She was later taken under tow, but sank on 5 October. |
| Rhineland | United Kingdom | World War II: Convoy OG 74: The cargo ship was torpedoed and sunk in the Atlantic Ocean (approximately 47°N 22°W) by U-201 (Kriegsmarine) with the loss of all 26 crew. |
| Rogaland | Norway | World War II: The cargo ship (902 GRT, 1929) was damaged by a mine in inner Oslofjord, and was beached at Hovedøya. Later towed to Nylands Verksted, Oslo for repairs. |
| Runa | United Kingdom | World War II: Convoy OG 74: The cargo ship was torpedoed and sunk in the Atlantic Ocean (46°20′N 22°23′W) by U-201 (Kriegsmarine) with the loss of fourteen of her 23 crew. Survivors were rescued by HMS Deptford (Royal Navy). |
| S. A. Levanevskiy | Soviet Union | World War II: The Ice-class cargo ship was sunk by Luftwaffe aircraft. She was raised November 1944 and rebuilt as a tanker. |
| Steregushchy | Soviet Navy | World War II: The Gnevny-class destroyer was bombed and sunk at Kronstadt by Junkers Ju 87 aircraft of III Staffeln, Sturzkampfgeschwader 2, Luftwaffe. She was raised, repaired and returned to service 1945. |
| Vancouver | United Kingdom | World War II: The tanker struck a mine and sank in the North Sea 2 nautical miles (3.7 km) off the Sunk Lightship ( Trinity House) (51°51′21″N 1°32′18″E) with the loss of 39 of her 42 crew. |
| Walmer Castle | United Kingdom | World War II: Convoy OG 74: The convoy rescue ship was bombed and damaged in the Atlantic Ocean (47°16′N 22°25′W) by a Focke-Wulf Fw 200 Condor aircraft of I Staffeln, Kampfgeschwader 40, Luftwaffe with the loss of ten lives, including five crew from Baltallin, Empire Moat (both United Kingdom), and five from City of Waterford (Ireland), or eleven crew and twenty survivors from the other ships. Walmer Castle was abandoned and was scuttled by HMS Deptford and HMS Marigold (both Royal Navy). |

== 22 September ==
List of shipwrecks: 22 September 1941
| Ship | State | Description |
|---|---|---|
| Alf | Soviet Union | World War II: The 166 GRT coaster was shelled and sunk off the southern tip of Osmussaar by German field artillery. |
| Edward Blyden | United Kingdom | World War II: Convoy SL 87 The 5,003 GRT cargo ship on a trip from Takoradi for Liverpool with general cargo, was torpedoed and sunk in the Atlantic Ocean (27°36′N 24°29′W) by U-103 (Kriegsmarine). Her 63 crew were rescued by HMS Bideford (Royal Navy). |
| Erna III | United Kingdom | World War II: Convoy ON 16: The 1,590 GRT cargo ship on a passage from Swansea for Montreal in ballast, straggled behind the convoy. She was torpedoed and sunk in the Atlantic Ocean north east of Cape Farewell, Greenland (61°45′N 35°15′W) by U-562 (Kriegsmarine) with the loss of all 25 crew. |
| HMML 144 | Royal Navy | World War II: The Fairmile B motor launch struck a mine and sank in the English Channel. |
| Niceto de Larrinaga | United Kingdom | World War II: Convoy SL 87: The 5,591 GRT cargo ship on a trip from Lagos for London with a cargo of palm kernels, groundnuts and manganese ore, was torpedoed and sunk in the Atlantic Ocean (27°32′N 24°26′W) by U-103 (Kriegsmarine) with the loss of two of her 55 crew. Survivors were rescued by HMS Gardenia and HMS Lulworth (both Royal Navy). |
| Sergey Kirov | Soviet Navy | World War II: The auxiliary minesweeper was torpedoed and sunk in the Baltic Sea by Syöksy (Finnish Navy) with the loss of 35 of her 36 crew. The survivor was taken as a prisoner of war |
| Silverbelle | United Kingdom | World War II: Convoy SL 87: The 5,302 GRT cargo ship on a trip from Durban for Liverpool with a cargo of phosphates, was torpedoed and damaged in the Atlantic Ocean (25°45′N 24°00′W) by U-68 (Kriegsmarine). Silverbelle was taken under tow by Commandant Duboc (Free French Naval Forces) but sank on 29 September at 26°30′N 23°14′W). All 60 people on board were rescued. |
| SKA-022 | Soviet Navy | The The MO-4-class patrol vessel was bombed and sunk by 10 Luftwaffe Junkers Ju 87 bombers off Tendra Spit. |
| Taifun | Soviet Union | World War II: The 515 GRT tug was bombed and sunk in the Black Sea off Tendra Spit (46°20′N 31°33′E) by Junkers Ju-87 bombers. Two of her crew were killed. |
| Vechtstroom | Netherlands | World War II: The 845 GRT coaster on a passage from Grimsby for London was bombed and sunk in the North Sea off Humber Lightship (53°42′N 00°30′W) by Dornier Do 217 aircraft of Kampfgeschwader 2, Luftwaffe. Her crew were rescued. |
| Vikhr | Soviet Navy | World War II: The Uragan-class guard ship was sunk by Luftwaffe aircraft at Kronstadt. She was raised in 1943, repaired, and returned to service in 1945. |
| Vohi | Soviet Navy | World War II: The requisitioned 516 GRT coaster (VT-566) was shelled and set on fire by German field artillery while unloading her cargo of ammunition at the southern tip of Osmussaar. After her cargo was unloaded, she was pushed away and burnt out in shallow water. |

== 23 September ==
List of shipwrecks: 23 September 1941
| Ship | State | Description |
|---|---|---|
| Arawak | United States | The coaster caught fire and sank off Cape Canaveral, Florida. |
| G-28 Carmelo Noli | Regia Marina | World War II: The 109 GRT auxiliary minesweeper, a converted tug, struck a mine and sank in the Mediterranean Sea off Secche di Vada, Livorno while sweeping the minefield laid by the British minelayer Manxman, with a loss of 8 of her 11 crew. |
| Luvsee | Germany | World War II: The 2,373 GRT cargo ship on a trip from Šibenik for Trieste with a cargo of bauxite, was torpedoed and sunk in the Adriatic Sea 6 nautical miles (11 km) north east of Šibenik (43°31′N 15°50′E) by HMS Triumph (Royal Navy) with a loss of 16 crew. |
| M-74 | Soviet Navy | World War II: The M-class submarine was bombed and sunk at Kronstadt by Junkers Ju 87 aircraft of I Staffeln, Sturzkampfgeschwader 2, Luftwaffe. She was raised in 1942, but not repaired, and was stricken in 1944. |
| Marat | Soviet Navy | World War II: The Gangut-class battleship was bombed and sunk in shallow water at Kronstadt by Junkers Ju 87 aircraft of III Staffeln, Sturzkampfgeschwader 2, Luftwaffe. She was used as a stationary gun battery for the remainder of the war. |
| Minsk | Soviet Navy | World War II: The Leningrad-class destroyer was sunk at Kronstadt by Luftwaffe aircraft. She was raised, repaired, and returned to service 1942. |
| No. 31 Ozernoy | Soviet Navy | The auxiliary minesweeper was lost on this date. |
| P-2 | Soviet Navy | World War II: The submarine was bombed and sunk at Kronstadt by Junkers Ju 87 aircraft of I Staffeln, Sturzkampfgeschwader 2, Luftwaffe. |
| Purga | Soviet Navy | World War II: The Uragan-class guard ship was sunk at Kronstadt by Luftwaffe aircraft. |
| Poseidone | Italy | World War II: The cargo ship was torpedoed and damaged in the Adriatic Sea 4 nautical miles (7.4 km) north east of Ortona by HMS Triumph (Royal Navy). |
| TKA-12 | Soviet Navy | World War II: The D-3-class motor torpedo boat was shelled and sunk in the Baltic Sea off Gogland by V 309 Martin Donandt (Kriegsmarine). |
| Tayfun | Soviet Navy | World War II: The guard ship was bombed and sunk at Kronstadt by Junkers Ju 87 aircraft of I Staffeln, Kampfgeschwader 2, Luftwaffe. |
| V 308 Oscar Neynaber | Kriegsmarine | World War II: The patrol ship was torpedoed and sunk in the Baltic Sea by TKA-12 (Soviet Navy). |

== 24 September ==
List of shipwrecks: 24 September 1941
| Ship | State | Description |
|---|---|---|
| Bereby | United Kingdom | The cargo ship ran aground and was wrecked at Ringfad Point, County Down due to the lighthouse being unlit. |
| Dixcove | United Kingdom | World War II: Convoy SL 87: The cargo ship was torpedoed and sunk in the Atlantic Ocean 300 nautical miles (560 km) south of the Azores (31°13′N 23°41′W) by U-107 (Kriegsmarine) with the loss of two of her 53 crew. Survivors were rescued by Ashby (United Kingdom) and Fana (Norway). |
| John Holt | United Kingdom | World War II: Convoy SL 87: The cargo ship was torpedoed and sunk in the Atlantic Ocean (31°12′N 23°32′W) by U-107 (Kriegsmarine) with the loss of one of her 69 crew. Survivors were rescued by HMS Gorleston (Royal Navy). |
| Kalø | Denmark | The cargo ship collided with Fishpool (United Kingdom) in the Red Sea (19°08′N 39°30′E) and sank. Her crew were rescued. |
| Lafian | United Kingdom | World War II: Convoy SL 87: The cargo ship was torpedoed and sunk in the Atlantic Ocean (31°12′N 23°32′W) by U-107 (Kriegsmarine). Her 47 crew were rescued by HMS Gorleston (Royal Navy). |
| Nigaristan | United Kingdom | The cargo ship caught fire in her coal bunkers and sank in the Atlantic Ocean 900 nautical miles (1,700 km) south east of Cape Farewell, Greenland (57°55′N 27°32′W) in a gale. All on board rescued by USS Eberle (United States Navy). |
| Prospero | Italy | World War II: The cargo ship was bombed and sunk at Benghazi, Libya by Royal Air Force aircraft. |
| Stamatios G. Embiricos | Greece | World War II: The cargo ship was shelled and sunk in the Atlantic Ocean (1°01′N 64°30′E) by Kormoran (Kriegsmarine) with the loss of five of her 35 crew. The survivors were taken as prisoners of war. |
| St. Clair II | United Kingdom | World War II: Convoy SL 87 The cargo ship was torpedoed and sunk in the Atlantic Ocean (30°25′N 23°35′W) by U-67 (Kriegsmarine) with the loss of thirteen of her 47 crew. Survivors were rescued by HMS Gorleston and HMS Lulworth (both Royal Navy). |
| 11 V 2 | Kriegsmarine | World War II: The 376 GRT Vorpostenboot, former Greek cargo-passenger ship Nicolaos L., ran aground and capsized after leaving Kastron and was subsequently abandoned. |

== 25 September ==
List of shipwrecks: 25 September 1941
| Ship | State | Description |
|---|---|---|
| Avra | Greece | The cargo ship collided with another vessel and sank north of John O'Groats, Caithness, United Kingdom (48°28′N 2°55′W. Her crew survived. |
| Empire Stream | United Kingdom | World War II: Convoy HG 73: The ore carrier was torpedoed and sunk in the Atlantic Ocean (46°03′N 24°40′W) by U-124 (Kriegsmarine) with the loss of all 46 people on board. |
| Essex | United States | The cargo ship was wrecked without loss of life on the coast of Block Island off Rhode Island. Her wreck settled in 30 feet (9.1 m) of water. |
| Ethel Skakel | United States | The cargo ship foundered in the Atlantic Ocean 125 nautical miles (232 km) north of Antigua with the loss of twenty of her 33 crew. |
| Königin Luise | Kriegsmarine | World War II: The minelayer struck a mine and sank in the Baltic Sea off Helsinki, Finland, with the loss of 40 of her crew. |
| Libby-Maine | United States | The cargo ship foundered in the Caribbean Sea off the coast of Venezuela. |
| Varangberg | Norway | World War II: Convoy HG 73: The cargo ship was torpedoed and sunk in the Atlantic Ocean (47°50′N 24°50′W) by U-203 (Kriegsmarine) with the loss of 22 or her 28 crew. Survivors were rescued by HMS Jasmine (Royal Navy). |
| Webster No. IV | United States | The scow was stranded and lost about 200 yards (180 m) from the entrance to Dear Harbor in the Territory of Alaska. Both people on board reached safety. |

== 26 September ==
List of shipwrecks: 26 September 1941
| Ship | State | Description |
|---|---|---|
| Avoceta | United Kingdom | World War II: Convoy HG 73: The cargo ship was torpedoed and sunk in the Atlantic Ocean north of the Azores, Portugal (47°57′N 24°05′W) by U-203 (Kriegsmarine) with the loss of 123 of the 166 people on board. Survivors were rescued by Cervantes (United Kingdom), HMS Jasmine and HMS Periwinkle (both Royal Navy). |
| British Prince | United Kingdom | World War II: The cargo ship was bombed and sunk in the North Sea (53°51′40″N 0°25′22″E) by Dornier Do 217 aircraft of Kampfgeschwader 2, Luftwaffe. Her 38 crew were rescued. |
| Capodoglio | Italy | World War II: The fishing trawler was bombed and sunk in the Mediterranean Sea by Royal Air Force aircraft. |
| Cortes | United Kingdom | World War II: Convoy HG 73: The cargo ship was torpedoed and sunk in the Atlantic Ocean (47°48′N 23°45′W) by U-203 (Kriegsmarine) with the loss of all 43 people on board. |
| Empire Kudu | United Kingdom | The Design 1037 ship came ashore in a storm 6 nautical miles (11 km) west of Point Armour, Belle Isle Strait. She was a total loss. |
| Empire Mallard | United Kingdom | World War II: The cargo ship collided with Empire Moon (United Kingdom) and sank in the Strait of Belle Isle. She was in convoy at the time, on a voyage from New York, United States to the River Mersey. |
| Essex | United States | The cargo ship ran aground on Block Island off the coast of Rhode Island, broke up, and sank in up to 30 feet (9.1 m) of water 0.25 nautical miles (0.46 km; 0.29 mi) southeast of Southeast Point Lighthouse (41°08′58″N 071°32′54″W) without loss of life. |
| Gillhausen | Germany | The cargo ship ran aground and sank off Kirkenes, Norway. |
| I. C. White | Panama | World War II: The 7,052 GRT tanker on a trip from Curaçao for Capetown with a cargo of crude oil, was torpedoed and sunk in the Atlantic Ocean (10°26′S 27°30′W) by U-66 (Kriegsmarine) with the loss of three of her 37 crew. Survivors were rescued by Delnorte and West Nilus (both United States) |
| Kantara | United Kingdom | The schooner sank at an unknown location. |
| Lapwing | United Kingdom | World War II: Convoy HG 73: The cargo ship straggled behind the convoy. She was torpedoed and sunk in the Atlantic Ocean north north west of the Azores (47°40′N 23°28′W) by U-103 (Kriegsmarine) with the loss of 24 of her 34 crew. Other casualties included two of the three rescued from Cortes (United Kingdom). |
| Mosel I | Kriegsmarine | World War II: The U-boat tender was mined and sunk off Ventspils, Latvia (57°24′N 21°33′E). |
| Petrel | United Kingdom | World War II: Convoy HG 73: The cargo ship was torpedoed and sunk in the Atlantic Ocean (47°40′N 23°30′W) by U-124 (Kriegsmarine) with the loss of 22 of her 31 crew. Survivors were rescued by Lapwing (United Kingdom). |
| Shchors | Soviet Navy | The guard ship was lost on this date. |
| South Wales | United Kingdom | The cargo ship was driven ashore 6 nautical miles (11 km) west of the Point Amour Lighthouse, Labrador, Dominion of Newfoundland. She was a total loss. |
| UJ-1201 Steiermark | Kriegsmarine | World War II: The naval trawler was torpedoed off Rolvsøy, Norway by HMS Trident (Royal Navy) just before midnight during the night of 26–27 September. Twenty of her crew were killed. The bow broke and sank, while the stern was towed to Hammerfest. Later it was towed to Rostock for repairs that were completed in April 1944. |

== 27 September ==
List of shipwrecks: 27 September 1941
| Ship | State | Description |
|---|---|---|
| Albatros | Regia Marina | World War II: The torpedo boat was torpedoed and sunk in the Mediterranean Sea off Messina, Sicily (38°24′N 15°22′E) by HMS Upright (Royal Navy). Thirty-two crew and two German officers sank with her. There were 49 survivors, but two of them subsequently died of their wounds. |
| Cervantes | United Kingdom | World War II: Convoy HG 73: The 1,810 GRT cargo ship on a trip from Lisbon for London with a cargo of potash and cork, was torpedoed and sunk in the Atlantic Ocean north north east of the Azores, Portugal (48°37′N 20°01′W) by U-201 (Kriegsmarine) with the loss of eight of the 40 people on board. Survivors were rescued by Starling (United Kingdom). |
| Città di Bastia | Italy | World War II: The cargo ship was torpedoed and sunk in the Mediterranean Sea (36°21′N 24°23′E) by HMS Tetrarch (Royal Navy) with the loss of 150 lives. There were 432 survivors. |
| Fram | Faroe Islands | World War II: The fishing trawler was bombed and sunk at Vestmannhavn by Luftwaffe aircraft. There were no casualties. |
| Imperial Star | United Kingdom | World War II: The 12,427 GRT refrigerated cargo liner on a voyage from Liverpool to Malta with a cargo of war supplies, was torpedoed and heavily damaged by 2 SM.79 torpedo bombers of 278^{a} Squadriglia in the Mediterranean Sea northeast of Tunis, Tunisia (37°31′N 10°46′E). Her crew were rescued by HMS Farndale and HMS Heythrop (both Royal Navy). The vessel was taken in tow by HMS Oribi (Royal Navy) but had to be scuttled the next day. |
| Margareta | United Kingdom | World War II: Convoy HG 73: The 3,103 GRT cargo ship on a trip from Gibraltar for Glasgow with general cargo, was torpedoed and sunk in the Atlantic Ocean (50°15′N 17°27′W) by U-201 (Kriegsmarine). Her 34 crew were rescued by HMS Hibiscus (Royal Navy). |
| MO-196 | Soviet Navy | World War II: The MO-4-class patrol vessel was shelled and sunk in Lake Ladoga off Shlisselburg by German field artillery. |
| No. 13 | Soviet Navy | World War II: The KM-2 Type motor launch was shelled and sunk in the Lake Ladoga by German artillery. |
| Panagiotis Kramottos | Greece | World War II: The coaster was shelled and sunk in the Aegean Sea south west of Milos by HMS Tetrarch (Royal Navy). |
| Pioner | Soviet Navy | World War II: The gunboat, a former Kopchik-class dispatch vessel, was sunk in the Leningrad Sea Canal by German artillery and Luftwaffe aircraft. She was raised in October 1944, repaired, and returned to service on 30 November 1945. |
| Siremalm | Norway | World War II: Convoy HG 73: The cargo ship was torpedoed and sunk in the Atlantic Ocean (49°05′N 20°10′W) by U-124 (Kriegsmarine) with the loss of all 27 crew. |
| HMS Springbank | Royal Navy | World War II: Convoy HG 73: The fighter catapult ship was torpedoed and damaged in the Atlantic Ocean (49°09′N 20°10′W) by U-201 (Kriegsmarine) with the loss of 32 of her 233 crew. Survivors were rescued by HMS Hibiscus, HMS Jasmine and HMS Periwinkle (all Royal Navy). HMS Springbank was subsequently scuttled by HMS Jasmine. |
| TKA-24 | Soviet Navy | World War II: The G-5-class motor torpedo boat was shelled and sunk in Lõu laht, Saaremaa by Emden and Leipzig (both Kriegsmarine). Her crew was saved by other torpedo boats. |
| No 485 | Soviet Navy | World War II: The barge was sunk by artillery fire in the Onega Lake while evacuating civilians. There were 41 dead and 78 survivors. |

== 28 September ==
List of shipwrecks: 28 September 1941
| Ship | State | Description |
|---|---|---|
| Fisalia | Regia Marina | Fisalia World War II: The Argonauta-class submarine was shelled and sunk in the Mediterranean Sea off Jaffa, Palestine (39°19′N 34°17′E) by HMS Hyacinth (Royal Navy). |
| Murielle | United Kingdom | World War II: The 86.2-foot (26.3 m), 96-ton fishing drifter, a former naval drifter, was damaged by a mine that exploded in her nets in the Irish Sea about 8 nautical miles (15 km) south west of the Morecambe Bay Lightship ( Trinity House). The crew were taken off by the drifter Ocean Dawn (United Kingdom). Murielle was taken in tow but later sank 3 miles (4.8 km) north west of Blackpool Tower. |
| MO-305 | Soviet Navy | World War II: The MO-4-class patrol boat was bombed and sunk by Luftwaffe aircraft off Sõmeri. |
| Yalova | Germany | World War II: The cargo ship was torpedoed and damaged in the Mediterranean Sea 20 nautical miles (37 km) south of San Giorgio by HMS Tetrarch (Royal Navy) and was beached on Agios Giorgios Island. She was torpedoed and sunk on 3 October by HMS Talisman (Royal Navy). |

== 29 September ==
List of shipwrecks: 29 September 1941
| Ship | State | Description |
|---|---|---|
| Fluvior | Italy | World War II: The coastal tanker struck a mine and sank at Tripoli, Libya. |
| Ilvania | Italy | The coaster sank at Port Torres, Sardinia. |
| Superga | Italy | World War II: The tanker was torpedoed and damaged in the Black Sea (43°00′N 27°58′E) by Shch-211 (Soviet Navy) with the loss of two lives. She came ashore and broke in two. Both sections were torpedoed the next day by Shch-211 and she was declared a total loss. |
| No. 22 | Soviet Navy | The KM-2 Type motor launch was lost on this date. |

== 30 September ==
List of shipwrecks: 30 September 1941
| Ship | State | Description |
|---|---|---|
| Adua | Regia Marina | World War II: The Adua-class submarine was depth charged and sunk in the Mediterranean Sea east of Cartagena, Spain by HMS Gurkha and HMS Legion (both Royal Navy) with the loss of all 47 crew. |
| Aurora | Soviet Navy | World War II: The Pallada-class cruiser was sunk in Oranienbaum harbour. She was raised in 1944 and repaired post-war for use as a museum ship. |
| HMT Eileen Duncan | Royal Navy | World War II: The naval trawler was bombed and sunk in the River Tyne by Luftwaffe aircraft. Eight of her crew were killed. |
| Pugachev | Soviet Union | World War II: The incomplete cargo ship, being towed between Kerch and Novorossiysk, was bombed and sunk by Luftwaffe aircraft. Her crew were rescued |
| HMT Star of Deveron | Royal Navy | World War II: The naval trawler was bombed and sunk in the River Tyne by Luftwaffe aircraft with the loss of a crew member. |
| UJ 117 | Kriegsmarine | World War II: The Mob-FD1-class submarine chaser was sunk by a mine in the Baltic Sea off Bengtskär, Finland with the loss of 30 of her 57 crew. |

== Unknown date ==
List of shipwrecks: Unknown date 1941
| Ship | State | Description |
|---|---|---|
| Alessandro Malaspina | Regia Marina | World War II: The Marconi-class submarine (1,191/1,489 t, 1940) was lost in the Atlantic Ocean after 7 September. |
| T-455 Nikolay Markin | Soviet Navy | World War II: The Project 73K-class minesweeper was destroyed on the slip at the 201 Yard, Sevastopol to prevent capture. |
| Smeraldo | Regia Marina | World War II: The Sirena-class submarine was probably sunk in the Mediterranean Sea off the coast of Tunisia by a mine between 16 and 25 September with the loss of 45 crew. |
| No. 23 | Soviet Navy | The KM-2 Type motor launch was lost sometime in September. |
| No. 41, No. 42, No. 43, No. 44, No. 45, No. 51, No. 52, No. 53, and No. 54 | Soviet Navy | The P Type armored motor gunboats were lost sometime in September. |
| No. 132, No. 134, and No. 135 | Soviet Navy | The D Type armored motor gunboats were lost sometime in September. |

== Notes ==
1. CKA are the Cyrillic letters. The English translation would be SKA.
