= Italian submarine Fisalia =

Fisalia was the name of at least two ships of the Italian Navy and may refer to:

- Italian submarine Fisalia (1912), a Medusa-class submarine launched in 1912 and discarded in 1918.
- Italian submarine Fisalia (1931), an Argonauta-class submarine launched in 1931 and sunk in 1941.
