= HMCS Kenogami =

Flower-class corvette

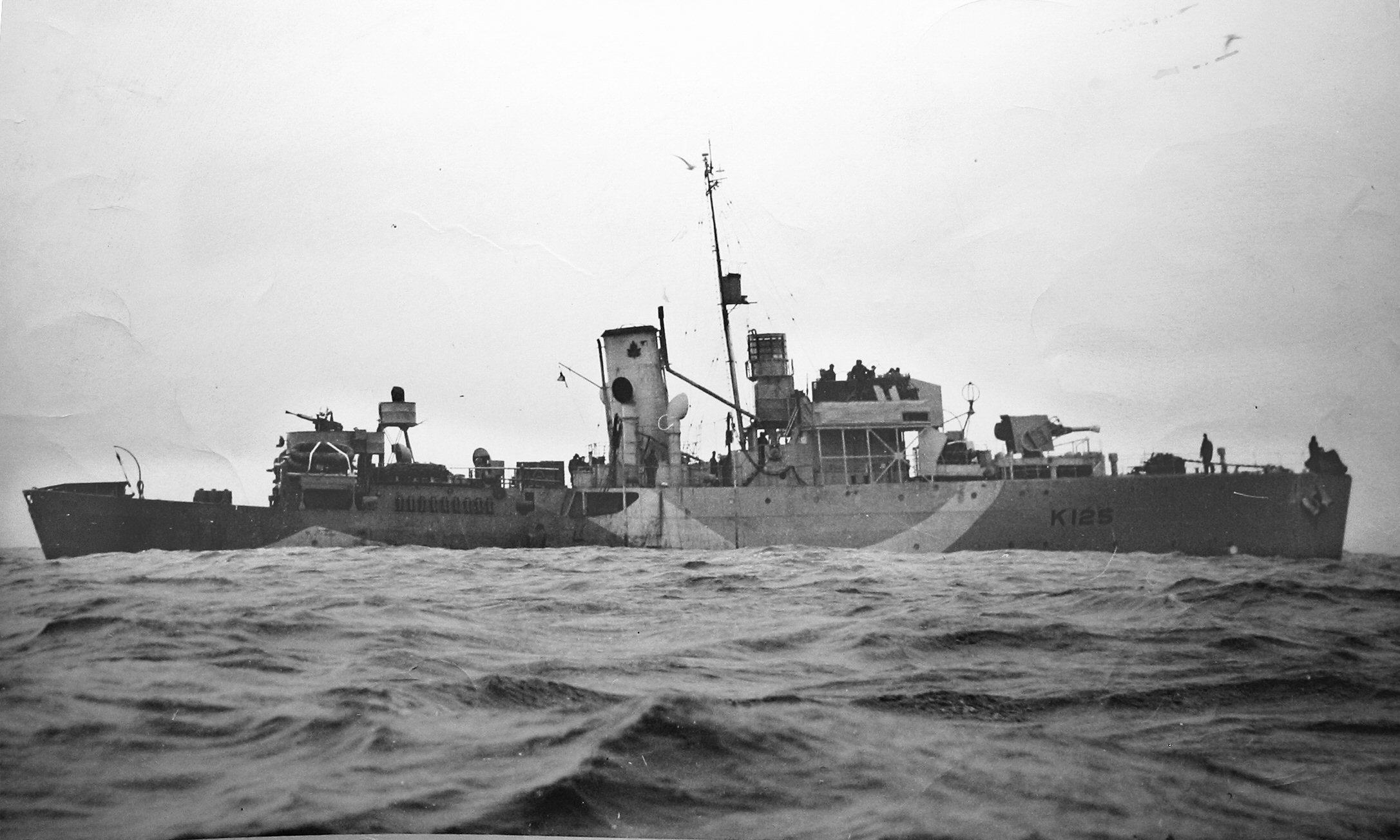
- HMCS Kenogami

History

Canada
- Namesake: Kénogami, Quebec
- Ordered: 1 February 1940
- Builder: Port Arthur Shipbuilding Co., Port Arthur
- Laid down: 20 April 1940
- Launched: 5 September 1940
- Commissioned: 29 June 1941
- Out of service: paid off 9 July 1945
- Refit: Completed 1 October 1944, Liverpool.
- Identification: Pennant number: K125
- Honours and awards: Atlantic 1941-45, Gulf of St. Lawrence 1942
- Fate: Scrapped in January 1950

General characteristics
- Class & type: Flower-class corvette
- Displacement: 925 long tons (940 t; 1,036 short tons)
- Length: 205 ft (62.48 m)o/a
- Beam: 33 ft (10.06 m)
- Draught: 11.5 ft (3.51 m)
- Installed power: 2 × fire tube Scotch boilers; 1 × 4-cycle triple-expansion reciprocating steam engine; 2,750 ihp (2,050 kW)
- Propulsion: Single shaft
- Speed: 16 knots (30 km/h; 18 mph)
- Range: 3,500 nmi (6,482 km) at 12 knots (22 km/h; 14 mph)
- Complement: 85
- Sensors & processing systems: 1 × SW1C or 2C radar; 1 × Type 123A or Type 127DV sonar
- Armament: 1 × BL 4 in (102 mm) Mk.IX single gun; 2 × .50 cal machine gun (twin); 2 × Lewis .303 cal machine gun (twin); 2 × Mk.II depth charge throwers; 2 × depth charge rails with 40 depth charges

HMCS Kenogami was a Royal Canadian Navy Flower-class corvette that served during the Second World War. The corvette served primarily in convoy escort duties during the Battle of the Atlantic. Following the war, the ship was sold for scrap and broken up.

== Background ==
Flower-class corvettes like Kenogami serving with the Royal Canadian Navy during the Second World War were different to earlier and more traditional sail-driven corvettes. The "corvette" designation was created by the French as a class of small warships; the Royal Navy borrowed the term for a period but discontinued its use in 1877. During the hurried preparations for war in the late 1930s, Winston Churchill reactivated the corvette class, needing a name for smaller ships used in an escort capacity, in this case based on a whaling ship design. The generic name "flower" was used to designate the class of these ships, which – in the Royal Navy – were named after flowering plants.

Corvettes commissioned by the Royal Canadian Navy during the Second World War were named after communities for the most part, to better represent the people who took part in building them. This idea was put forth by Admiral Percy W. Nelles. Sponsors were commonly associated with the community for which the ship was named. Royal Navy corvettes were designed as open sea escorts, while Canadian corvettes were developed for coastal auxiliary roles which was exemplified by their minesweeping gear. Eventually the Canadian corvettes would be modified to allow them to perform better on the open seas.

== Construction ==
Kenogami was ordered 1 February 1940 as part of the 1939-1940 Flower-class building program. She was laid down by Port Arthur Shipbuilding Co. at Port Arthur on 20 April 1940 and was launched on 5 September 1940. She was commissioned into the Royal Canadian Navy (RCN) on 29 June 1941 at Montreal.

Kenogami underwent two major refits during her career. The first took place in June 1942 until August at Halifax. The second began in June 1944 at Liverpool, Nova Scotia and was completed in October of that year. During the second refit, her fo'c'sle was extended.

== War service ==
After arrival at Halifax, Kenogami briefly served with Halifax Force. In August 1941 she was assigned to Newfoundland Command where she worked with escort groups 24N, N16 and N17.

Kenogami took part in the severe convoy battle for SC 42. The convoy lost a total of eighteen merchant ships. On 10 September 1941, Kenogami, under the command of Lieutenant Commander R. Jackson, RCNVR, rescued 34 survivors from the crew of the British merchant ship Sally Mærsk, which was torpedoed and sunk by U-81 east-northeast of Cape Farewell at 61°40′N 40°30′W. The following day, Kenogami and Moose Jaw rescued 41 survivors from the crew of the British merchant Berury, which was torpedoed and sunk by German submarine U-207 east of Cape Farewell at 62°40′N 38°50′W. Kenogami, later the same day, rescued a further 7 survivors from the crew of the British merchant Stonepool, which was also torpedoed and sunk by U-207 east of Cape Farewell at 63°05′N 37°50′W. Initially, Kenogami was supposed to turn around at Iceland, but the attack had been overwhelming and she escorted the convoy all the way to the United Kingdom.

In February 1942 Kenogami made her first "Newfie" - Derry run, but on her return she transferred to the Western Local Escort Force (WLEF). She stayed with WLEF during her refit until October 1942 when she transferred to Mid-Ocean Escort Force (MOEF) escort group C-1. She stayed with group C-1 until June 1943.

Kenogami took part in another severe convoy battle for ONS 154 in fall 1942 as an ocean escort. The convoy lost fourteen ships. On 30 October 1942, Kenogami under the command of Lt. P.J.B. Cook, rescued 90 survivors from the crew of the British merchant Barrwhin, which was torpedoed and sunk the previous day by German submarine U-436 south of Iceland at 55°02′N 22°45′W.

In March 1943, Kenogami escorted one Gibraltar convoy. In May that year, she was attached to the Royal Navy escort group B-4. She returned to Canada in June 1944 for a refit and joined WLEF escort group W-8 upon completion of workups. In April 1944, Kenogami transferred to group W-4 and in December, group W-8. She remained with that group until the end of the war.

Kenogami was paid off on 9 July 1945 at Sydney. She was scrapped in January 1950 in Hamilton.

== Trivia ==
On 12 April 1941, (Note: Date does not match Kenogami's service history because she was only commissioned in June 1941.) Kenogami and HMS Azalea fired a shot over the bow of the US-flagged American Export liner Siboney 320 nautical miles (590 km; 370 mi) out of Lisbon. After crew aboard Azalea questioned Wenzel Habel, the captain of the unarmed passenger liner, Siboney was allowed to go on her way.
