= USS Twiggs (DD-127) =

Wickes-class destroyer

- HMS Leamington, ex-Twiggs

History

United States
- Name: USS Twiggs
- Namesake: Levi Twiggs
- Builder: New York Shipbuilding Corporation, Camden, New Jersey
- Laid down: 23 January 1918
- Launched: 28 September 1918
- Commissioned: 28 July 1919 to
- Decommissioned: 24 June 1922
- Recommissioned: 20 February 1930
- Decommissioned: 6 April 1937
- Recommissioned: 30 September 1939
- Decommissioned: 23 October 1940
- Stricken: 8 January 1941
- Identification: DD-127
- Fate: Transferred to UK, 23 October 1940

United Kingdom
- Name: HMS Leamington
- Acquired: 23 October 1940
- Identification: Pennant number: G19
- Fate: Transferred to USSR, 16 July 1944
- Notes: Transferred to Canada October 1942; returned to United Kingdom December 1943 or January 1944

Canada
- Name: Leamington
- Acquired: October 1942
- Honours and awards: Arctic 1942, Atlantic 1944-45
- Fate: Returned to United Kingdom, December 1943 or January 1944

Soviet Union
- Name: Zhguchy (Жгучий / Fiery)
- Acquired: 16 July 1944
- Fate: Returned to UK, 1950 and scrapped, on 26 July 1951

General characteristics
- Class & type: Wickes-class destroyer
- Displacement: 1,306 long tons (1,327 t)
- Length: 314 ft 4 in (95.81 m)
- Beam: 30 ft 11 in (9.42 m)
- Draft: 9 ft 9 in (2.97 m)
- Propulsion: 2 × steam turbines; 2 × shafts
- Speed: 35 kn (40 mph; 65 km/h)
- Complement: 122 officers and enlisted
- Armament: 4 × 4 in (100 mm) guns; 2 × 3 in (76 mm) guns; 12 × 21 inch (533 mm) torpedo tubes

The first USS Twiggs (DD–127) was a Wickes-class destroyer in the United States Navy during World War I. She was named for Major Levi Twiggs. She was later transferred to the Royal Navy, as HMS Leamington and to the Soviet Navy as Zhguchy, before returning to Britain to star in the film The Gift Horse, which depicts the St. Nazaire Raid.

== Service history ==
=== United States Navy service ===
Twiggs was laid down on 23 January 1918 at Camden, New Jersey, by the New York Shipbuilding Corporation. The ship was launched on 28 September 1918; sponsored by Miss Lillie S. Getchell, the granddaughter of Major Twiggs. Twiggs was commissioned at the Philadelphia Navy Yard on 28 July 1919.

Following shakedown, the destroyer joined Destroyer Division 16 (DesDiv 16), Destroyer Squadron 4 (Desron 4), Pacific Fleet, late in October 1919 and operated out of San Diego, California, on training cruises through the spring of 1922. While performing this duty, Twiggs was classified DD-127 on 17 July 1920 during the Navy-wide assignment of alphanumeric hull numbers. A combination of factors—increased operating costs, manpower shortages, and the general anti-military climate which followed World War I—resulted in a reduction of the Navy's active Fleet. Accordingly, Twiggs was decommissioned at San Diego on 24 June 1922.

After almost eight years of inactivity, Twiggs was placed in commission again on 20 February 1930 at San Diego. She became flagship of DesDiv 14 and conducted operations out of San Diego with the Battle Fleet until late in the year. Early in February 1931, she headed south from San Francisco with the Battle Fleet to participate in the annual Fleet concentration with the Scouting Fleet. At the end of the exercises on 15 March 1931, Twiggs was reassigned to the Scouting Fleet, soon to be redesignated the Scouting Force as a result of the Fleet Reorganization of on 1 April 1931. Twiggs new home port was Charleston, South Carolina, whence she operated as flagship of DesDiv 7 until late in the spring of 1933. Sometime between 1 April and on 1 July 1933, she rejoined the Battle Force destroyers on the west coast as a unit of DesDiv 6, DesRon 2. The destroyer was completely active until on 1 November 1933 when she joined Rotating Reserve DesRon 20 at San Diego. She remained there in a caretaker status—with a minimum crew on board—until on 1 July 1934, when she returned to fully active duty with DesDiv 4, DesRon 2. She operated out of San Diego with the Battle Force destroyers until late in 1936 when she began preparations for decommissioning. On 6 April 1937, Twiggs was placed out of commission and berthed at San Diego once again.

Towards the end of the destroyer's sojourn in San Diego's "red lead row", Germany invaded Poland on 1 September 1939. To augment the "Neutrality Patrol" which President Franklin Roosevelt had placed around the eastern seaboard and Gulf ports, the Navy quickly set the wheels in motion to recommission 77 destroyers and light minelayers which had been in reserve at either Philadelphia or San Diego. As part of this operation, Twiggs was recommissioned at San Diego on 30 September 1939, Cdr. Lyman K. Swenson in command.

As flagship for DesDiv 64, DesRon 32, Twiggs initially operated out of San Diego on shakedown and training cruises through November. In company with eight of her sister ships, she transited the Panama Canal early in December. Soon after reaching her new base at Key West, Florida, Twiggs got underway to shadow the British destroyer HMS Hereward. Later in the month, she joined sister ship Evans and the heavy cruiser Vincennes in keeping a close watch on the Australian light cruiser HMAS Perth as she prowled the Gulf of Yucatan on the alert to intercept the German liner SS Columbus which was attempting to slip through the Royal Navy to safety in Germany. The Americans maintained such a close surveillance of the Australian ship that her exasperated commander—Captain "Fearless Freddie" Farncomb—was heard to remark: "Queer idea of 'neutrality' these Americans have!"

During her subsequent operations with DesDiv 64, Twiggs conducted neutrality patrols, training cruises for Naval Reserve contingents, battle practices, and exercises through the summer of 1940.

Meanwhile, by the spring of 1940, the Allied cause had taken a decided turn for the worse, as Norway fell after a disastrous British-Norwegian defense, and France and the Low Countries crumbled under the German blitzkrieg. In addition, German submarines—preying upon the convoys in the Atlantic which served as England's lifeline—began taking heavy tolls on both the cargo ships and their escorts. After the fall of France, Britain found herself very much alone in her struggle to prevent German hegemony in Europe.

With British destroyer forces in bad shape (the beatings taken in Norway, in the Atlantic convoy lanes, and in the Dunkirk evacuation had cut deeply into the Royal Navy list of escort ships), Prime Minister Winston Churchill appealed to the U.S. for aid. By the summer of 1940, President Roosevelt hit upon a solution to the problems respectively facing the U.S. and Britain. Accordingly, he and the Prime Minister reached the Destroyers for Bases Agreement; in exchange for transferring 50 World War I-era destroyers to the British, the U.S. would gain 99-year leases on strategic base sites in the Western Hemisphere.

As the summer of 1940 gave way to fall, Twiggs began preparation for her transfer to Britain. She arrived at Halifax, Nova Scotia—the turnover point for the "50 ships that saved the world"—on 16 October 1940. The destroyer was decommissioned on 23 October, and her name was struck from the Navy list on 8 January 1941.

=== Royal Navy service ===
Turned over to the Royal Navy on 23 October 1940, the flush-decker became HMS Leamington, with the pennant number G 19, and Cdr. W. E. Banks, DSO, in command. She shifted to St. John's, Newfoundland, whence she departed on 4 November as part of the 4th "Town" Flotilla, bound for the British Isles. En route to Belfast, Northern Ireland, she and her sister ships passed through the scene of the action fought on 5 November 1940 by the armed merchant cruiser HMS Jervis Bay, in defense of the homeward-bound Convoy HX 84, against the German pocket battleship Admiral Scheer. Jervis Bay's gallant delaying action enabled 32 of the 37 ships in the convoy to escape, although she herself was sunk in the action. Leamington searched for survivors but could find no signs of life.

Leamington arrived at Devonport Dockyard, on 15 November, where she was refitted for Royal Navy service. After workup and training, the destroyer was allocated to the 2nd Escort Group, Western Approaches Command, based at Londonderry Port. She conducted convoy escort missions across the Atlantic into 1941. On 28 April 1941, Leamington was one of three escorts detached from Convoy OB 314 to reinforce Convoy HX 121, under attack by German U-boats. When the corvette Gladiolus detected a submarine on her sonar, Leamington and sister ship Roxborough joined Gladiolus in attacking the contact. Although Gladiolus was credited with sinking the submarine, post-war analysis showed that the submarine, U-96 was undamaged. On 27 May 1941, Leamington was part of the escort of Convoy OB 325 when she collided with the Norwegian merchant ship Thyra, which sank, killing five aboard the merchant ship. Leamington was under repair at Liverpool until July that year, when she rejoined the 2nd Escort Group, which moved to Iceland in September. On 11 September, the 2nd Escort Group, including Leamington was sent to reinforce Convoy SC 42 under heavy attack off the east coast of Greenland from the U-boats of the wolfpack Markgraf, which had sunk 15 ships from the convoy already. On the afternoon of 11 September, Leamington and the destroyer HMS Veteran were sent ahead of the convoy to investigate a sighting by an aircraft of a submarine ahead of the Convoy. The two destroyers spotted U-207 on the surface and carried out a series of depth charge attacks against the submarine, which was destroyed with no survivors.

On 23 March 1942, the fast troop convoy WS 17 set out from the United Kingdom to Freetown, Sierra Leone, with Leamington part of the convoy's escort. On 27 March 1942, the German submarine U-587 sighted the convoy, and radioed a sighting report with the hope that other U-boats could be directed to attack the convoy. The destroyer Keppel picked up the transmission, and used High-frequency direction finding (HF/DF) to direct an attack against the German submarine by Leamington, Grove, Aldenham and Volunteer. They attacked and sunk U-587 with depth charges, the first submarine sunk with the aid of shipboard HF/DF. On 27 June Convoy PQ 17 set out from Iceland for Arkhangelsk in the Soviet Union, with Leamington joining the convoy's close escort on 30 June. On 4 July, believing that the German battleship Tirpitz and other heavy ships had sortied against the convoy, the British First Sea Lord, Admiral Dudley Pound ordered that the convoy be scattered, with the escort, including Leamington, being withdrawn to the west. This exposed the lone, unescorted ships to continued unopposed attacks by German U-boats and aircraft. In total, PQ 17 lost 24 of 36 merchant ships, with 21 sunk after the order to scatter.

Leamington was refitted at Hartlepool, England, between July and November 1942. On 12 November, the Panamian registry merchantman SS Buchanan was torpedoed by U-224. Thirteen days later, Leamington—assisted by aircraft—located one of the freighter's four lifeboats and took aboard its 17 uninjured sailors.

=== Royal Canadian Navy service ===
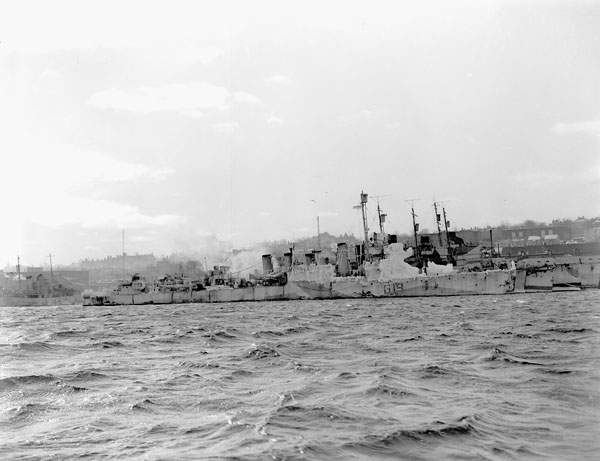
Leamington covered in ice on 22 January 1943

In November 1942, the Royal Navy transferred Leamington to the Royal Canadian Navy, joining the Western Local Escort Force, escorting convoys from New York and Halifax, Nova Scotia to off Newfoundland, where the convoys were handed over to the Mid-Ocean Escort Force. She experienced extremely bad weather, with extensive icing conditions, while operating in the North Atlantic in late 1942 and early 1943. At one point, the ship reached Halifax after a severe gale on 22 January 1943, coated from bridge to forecastle deck with ice varying from 2–10 ft (0.61–3.05 m) thick. (Note: Blair singles out Leamington from the eleven British destroyers on loan to the Canadians, including ten Town-class destroyers as being unsuitable for open ocean operations due to poor endurance.)

In April 1943, (Note: Both Hague and Mason state that the collision occurred in April, with repair work starting on 15 April, with the DANFS entry for Albatross stating that the collision occurred on 11 April. The DANFS entry for Twiggs/Leamington states that the collision took place on 27 May.) Leamington collided with the American minesweeper USS Albatross and was under repair at Halifax until 3 June. Later that month, she collided with the merchant ship Mortimer and was repaired at Norfolk, Virginia with work continuing until October 1943.

=== Soviet Navy service ===
Departing Halifax on 22 December, Leamington returned to the British Isles and reverted to Royal Navy control. After a period of service based at Rosyth, Scotland, Leamington was placed in reserve at the Tyne. However, on 16 June 1944, the British loaned the ship to the Russians, who renamed her Zhguchy (rus. Жгучий, "Fiery"). She served under the Russian flag through 1949 and was returned to Great Britain in 1950, when she starred in the Trevor Howard film Gift Horse as the fictional "HMS Ballantrae", (ex- "USS Whittier") which depicted the St Nazaire Raid. She was subsequently sold to John Cashmore Ltd and broken up for scrap at Newport, Wales on 26 July 1951.
