= HMS Veteran (D72) =

Destroyer of the Royal Navy

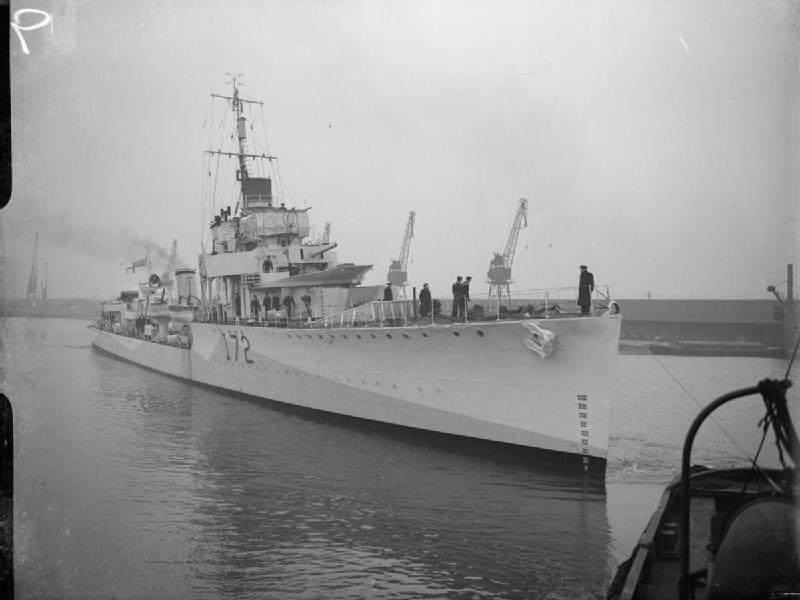
- HMS Veteran in King George V Dock, London in 1942

History

United Kingdom
- Name: HMS Veteran
- Ordered: April 1918
- Builder: John Brown & Company
- Laid down: 30 August 1918
- Launched: 26 August 1919
- Commissioned: 13 November 1919
- Identification: Pennant number; D72 – Nov 1919; I72 – May 1940
- Motto: Laudator temporis acti; Proud of former deeds
- Honours and awards: Martinique 1794, Camperdown 1797; Copenhagen 1801, Atlantic 1939–42; Norway 1940, North Sea 1940
- Fate: Sunk on 26 September 1942
- Badge: On a Field Green, an old warrior's head, helmeted Proper.

General characteristics
- Class & type: Admiralty modified W-class destroyer
- Displacement: 1,140 tons standard; 1,550 tons full load
- Length: 312 ft o/a, 300 ft p/p
- Beam: 29.5 feet (9.0 m)
- Draught: 9 feet (2.7 m), 11 feet 7.5 inches (3.543 m) under full load
- Propulsion: Yarrow type Water-tube boilers, Brown-Curtis geared steam turbines, 2 shafts, 27,000 shp
- Speed: 34 kn
- Range: 320-370 tons oil; 3,500 nmi at 15 kn, 900 nmi at 34 kn
- Complement: 127
- Armament: As built 1920: 4 × BL 4.7 in (120 mm) Mk.I guns, mount P Mk.I; 2 × QF 2 pdr Mk.II "pom-pom" (40 mm L/39); 6 × 21-inch torpedo tubes

General characteristics SRE Conversion
- Propulsion: 2 × Yarrow type water tube boilers; Parsons geared steam turbines driving 2 shafts; 18,000 shp
- Speed: 24.5 kn
- Range: 320-370 tons oil; 3,500 nmi at 15 kn; 900 nmi at 32 kn
- Complement: 134
- Sensors & processing systems: Type 271 Target Indication Radar; Type 286P Air Warning Radar
- Electronic warfare & decoys: Medium Frequency Direction Finding Outfit FM7 fitted Feb, 1941
- Armament: 2 × BL 4.7 in (120mm) Mk.I L/45 guns; 1 × QF 12 pounder 12 cwt naval gun; 2 × QF 2 pdr Mk.II "pom-pom" (40 mm L/39); 3 × 21-inch torpedo tubes (one triple mount); 2 × depth charge racks; Hedgehog anti-submarine mortar (replace 'A' turret)

Service record
- Part of: 3rd Destroyer Flotilla - 1920; 18th Destroyer Flotilla – Dec 1939
- Operations: Nanking Incident 1927; World War II 1939 to 1945
- Victories: U-207 – 11 Sep 1941

HMS Veteran was an Admiralty modified W-class destroyer built for the Royal Navy. She was ordered in April 1918 from John Brown & Company under the 14th War Program. She was the third Royal Navy ship to carry the name.

== Construction ==
HMS Veteran's keel was laid on 30 August 1918 at the James Brown & Company Shipyard in Clydebank, Scotland. She was launched on 26 April 1919. She was 312 feet overall in length with a beam of 29.5 feet. Her mean draught was 9 feet, and would reach 11.25 feet under full load. She had a displacement of 1,140 tons standard and up to 1,550 full load.

She was propelled by three Yarrow type water tube boilers powering Brown-Curtis geared steam turbines developing 27,000 shp driving twin propellers for a maximum designed speed of 34 knots. She was oil-fired and had a bunkerage of 320 to 350 tons. This gave a range of between 3500 nautical miles at 15 knots to 900 nautical miles at 32 knots.

She shipped four BL 4.7 in Mk.I guns, mount P Mk.I naval guns in four single centre-line mounts. The turrets were disposed as two forward and two aft in super imposed firing positions. She also carried two QF 2 pdr Mk.II "pom-pom" (40 mm L/39) mounted abeam between funnels. Abaft of the 2nd funnel, she carried six 21-inch torpedo tubes in two triple mounts on the centre-line.

== Inter-war years ==
HMS Veteran was commissioned into the Royal Navy on 13 November 1919 with the pennant number D72. After commissioning she was assigned to the 3rd Destroyer Flotilla of the Atlantic Fleet. The Flotilla was transferred to the Mediterranean Fleet in 1923, then in 1926 to China Station. She was involved in the Nanking Incident in March 1927. In early 1930s after a refit, she was placed in reserve as more modern destroyers came on line.

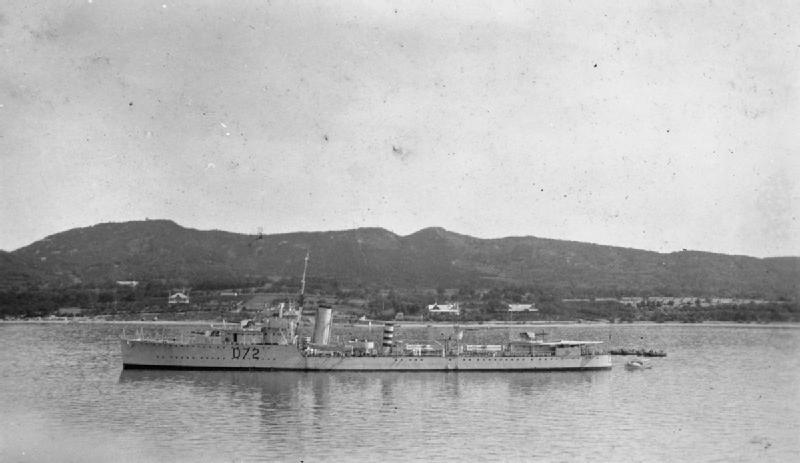
HMS Veteran on the China Station in July 1927

== World War II ==
In 1939, HMS Veteran was in dockyard hands for a major refit. As with most elderly destroyers allocated to escort duties, the after bank of torpedo tubes was removed and replaced with a single QF 12 pounder 12 cwt naval gun. 'Y' gun was also landed to make additional space for depth charge gear and stowage. She was recommissioned into service in November 1939, commanded by Lieut. Cdr J E Broome, a veteran of the First World War.

In December, upon completion of post refit trials, HMS Veteran joined the 18th Destroyer Flotilla based at Plymouth in the Western Approaches Command for Channel escort and anti-submarine patrols. In February she collided with HMS H46 and in March with the SS Horn Shell, which required HMS Veteran to put in for repairs.

Following an application by Lt Cdr Broome, HMS Veteran was made a life member of the Company of Veteran Motors in early 1940. The ship was presented with a king-size Veteran Motorist insignia that was subsequently mounted on the front of the ship's bridge. Members of CVM also supplied the crew with welfare supplies including knitted clothing.

In April HMS Veteran was transferred to Scapa Flow after the German invasion of Norway. She escorted convoys for the Norwegian Campaign, including the withdrawal, until damaged in a collision with the mercantile Ngkoa on 29 May. At this time her pennant number was changed to I72 for visual signalling purposes. Upon release from the Home Fleet HMS Veteran was transferred to Harwich for convoy defence in the North Sea. From July to September employed in anti-invasion patrols and convoy defence. During a patrol off Ostend with HMS Wild Swan and HMS Malcolm they sank several invasion barges. HMS Veteran was damaged by an acoustic mine and required repair. At this time she had her weaponry upgraded with the fitting of 20mm Oerlikon cannons for short range anti-air defence.

At the end of September, HMS Veteran was transferred to the Western Approaches Command and based out of Londonderry for Atlantic convoy defence. She escorted several convoys outbound and inbound until involved in a collision with HMS Verity in January 1941.

February saw HMS Veteran at Barrow-in Furness undergoing repair and refit. A Medium Frequency Direction Finder Outfit FM7 was fitted for navigation, but was not useful against U-boats as they used a higher frequency for radio communications. Her refit and trials complete on 13 March. She resumed her duties in Atlantic convoy defence out of Londonderry.

On 20 March she participated in the search for the German warships Scharnhorst and Gneisenau In September 1941, she dropped depth charges on German U-boat U-207 at position 63°59'N, 34°48'W, which had attacked convoy SC 42. U-207 was sunk, and HMS Veteran shared credit for her sinking with HMS Leamington. This was given after a post-war analysis of the attack. In January 1942, she underwent conversion to a short-range escort (SRE) at a commercial shipyard in London. To augment the earlier changes, the replacement of the after bank of torpedo tubes with a single QF 12-pounder 12 cwt naval gun and the landing of 'Y' gun for additional space for depth charge gear and stowage, the 2 pdr "pompoms" were replaced with two Oerlikon 20 mm cannons amidships, and the 'A' gun was replaced by a Hedgehog anti-submarine mortar. A Type 271 centimetric target indication radar was added on the bridge and a Type 286M air warning radar was installed on the main mast.

By March with her workups following conversion complete she was detached for service off the East Coast of the US and Canada. From May to August she was deployed for convoy defence between US and Canadian Ports to Newfoundland.

In September she was nominated for a special convoy RB1. On the 16th she sailed with HMS Vanoc.

=== Loss ===
On 23 September 1942, Convoy RB1 was sighted by U-380 and U-boat Group Blitz was ordered to attack. Groups Vorwarts and Pfiel were also directed against RB1. On the 25th SS Boston and SS New York were sunk and the convoy scattered. On 26 September the convoy was ordered to reform and HMS Veteran came across the survivors of SS New York. While she was picking up some of the survivors HMS Veteran was hit by two torpedoes from U-404, and sank quickly at position 54°51′N 023°04′W south of Iceland after an explosion. All hands, and a number of survivors from SS New York, were lost; other survivors from SS New York were later rescued.

== Image gallery ==
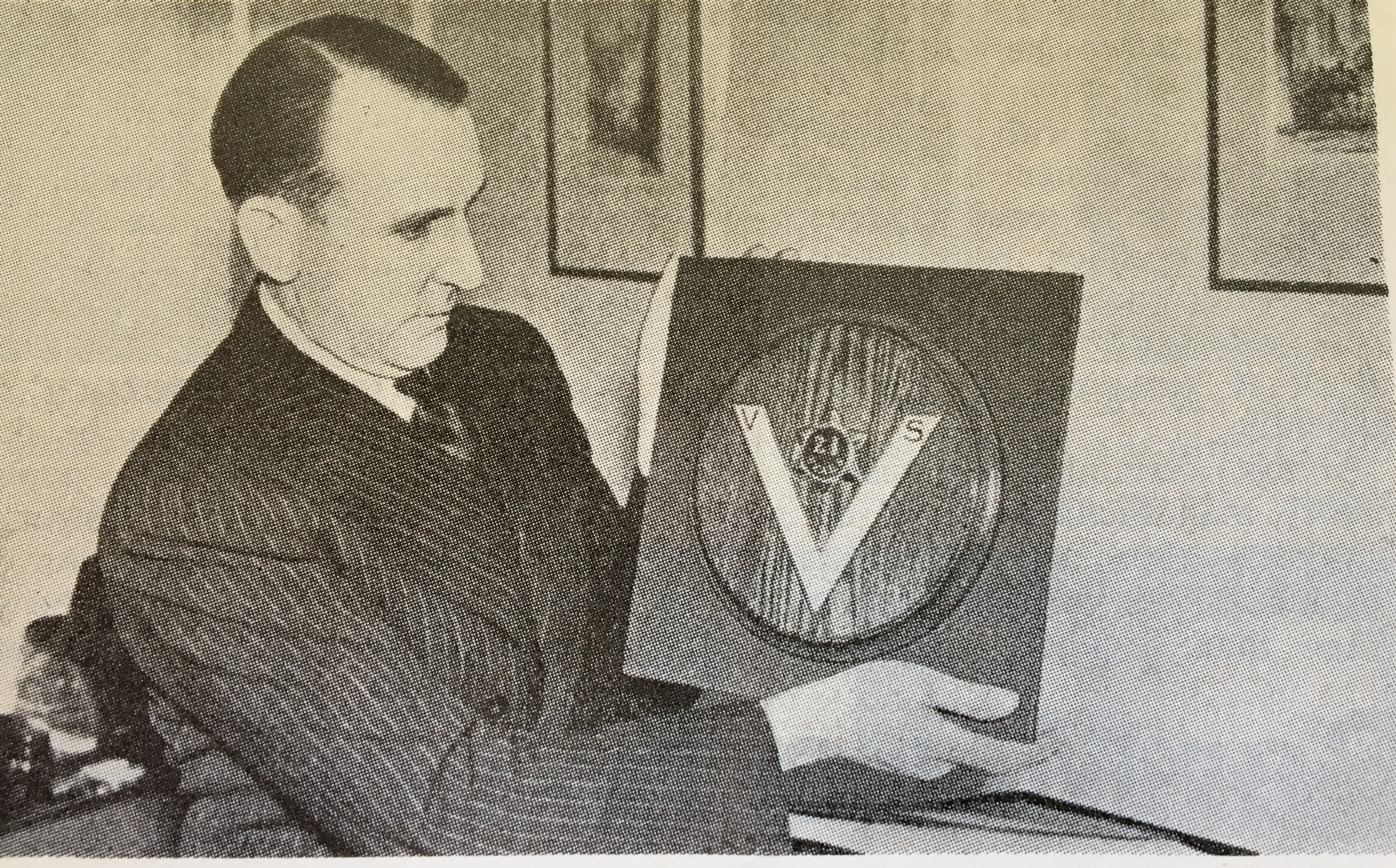
Founder and Secretary of the Company of Veteran Motorists, Dick Wood, with the specially commissioned king-size CVM badge that was displayed on HMS Veteran.

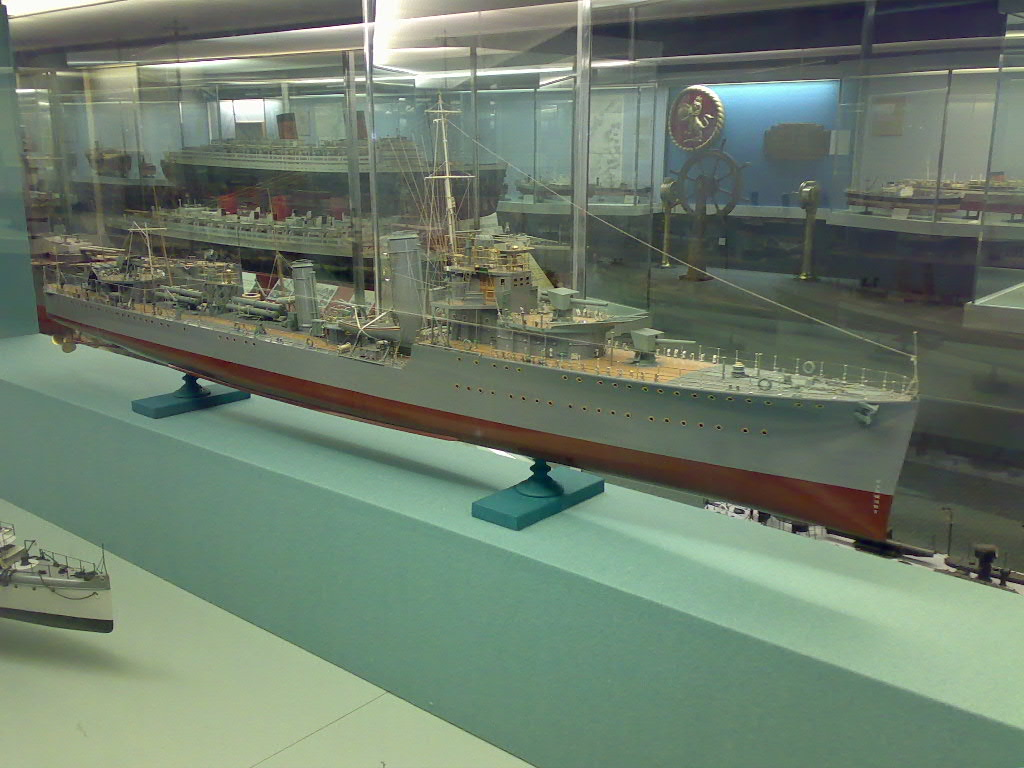
Model of HMS Veteran in Glasgow

== Bibliography ==
- Campbell, John (1985). Naval Weapons of World War II. Annapolis, Maryland: Naval Institute Press. ISBN 0-87021-459-4.
- Chesneau, Roger, ed. (1980). Conway's All the World's Fighting Ships 1922–1946. Greenwich, UK: Conway Maritime Press. ISBN 0-85177-146-7.
- Colledge, J. J.; Warlow, Ben (2006) [1969]. Ships of the Royal Navy: The Complete Record of All Fighting Ships of the Royal Navy from the 15th Century to the Present (3rd Rev ed.). London: Chatham Publishing. ISBN 978-1-86176-281-8. OCLC 67375475.
- Cocker, Maurice (1981). Destroyers of the Royal Navy, 1893–1981. Ian Allan. ISBN 0-7110-1075-7.
- Friedman, Norman (2009). British Destroyers From Earliest Days to the Second World War. Annapolis, Maryland: Naval Institute Press. ISBN 978-1-59114-081-8.
- Gardiner, Robert & Gray, Randal, eds. (1985). Conway's All the World's Fighting Ships 1906–1921. Annapolis, Maryland: Naval Institute Press. ISBN 0-85177-245-5.
- Lenton, H. T. (1998). British & Empire Warships of the Second World War. Annapolis, Maryland: Naval Institute Press. ISBN 1-55750-048-7.
- March, Edgar J. (1966). British Destroyers: A History of Development, 1892–1953; Drawn by Admiralty Permission From Official Records & Returns, Ships' Covers & Building Plans. London: Seeley Service. OCLC 164893555.
- Preston, Antony (1971). 'V & W' Class Destroyers 1917–1945. London: Macdonald. OCLC 464542895.
- Raven, Alan & Roberts, John (1979). 'V' and 'W' Class Destroyers. Man o'War. Vol. 2. London: Arms & Armour. ISBN 0-85368-233-X.
- Rohwer, Jürgen (2005). Chronology of the War at Sea 1939–1945: The Naval History of World War Two (Third Revised ed.). Annapolis, Maryland: Naval Institute Press. ISBN 1-59114-119-2.
- Whinney, Bob (2000). The U-boat Peril: A Fight for Survival. Cassell. ISBN 0-304-35132-6.
- Whitley, M. J. (1988). Destroyers of World War 2. Annapolis, Maryland: Naval Institute Press. ISBN 0-87021-326-1.
- Winser, John de D. (1999). B.E.F. Ships Before, At and After Dunkirk. Gravesend, Kent: World Ship Society. ISBN 0-905617-91-6.
