= Kõiguste =

Village in Estonia

Coordinates: 58°23′N 22°59′E

- Village
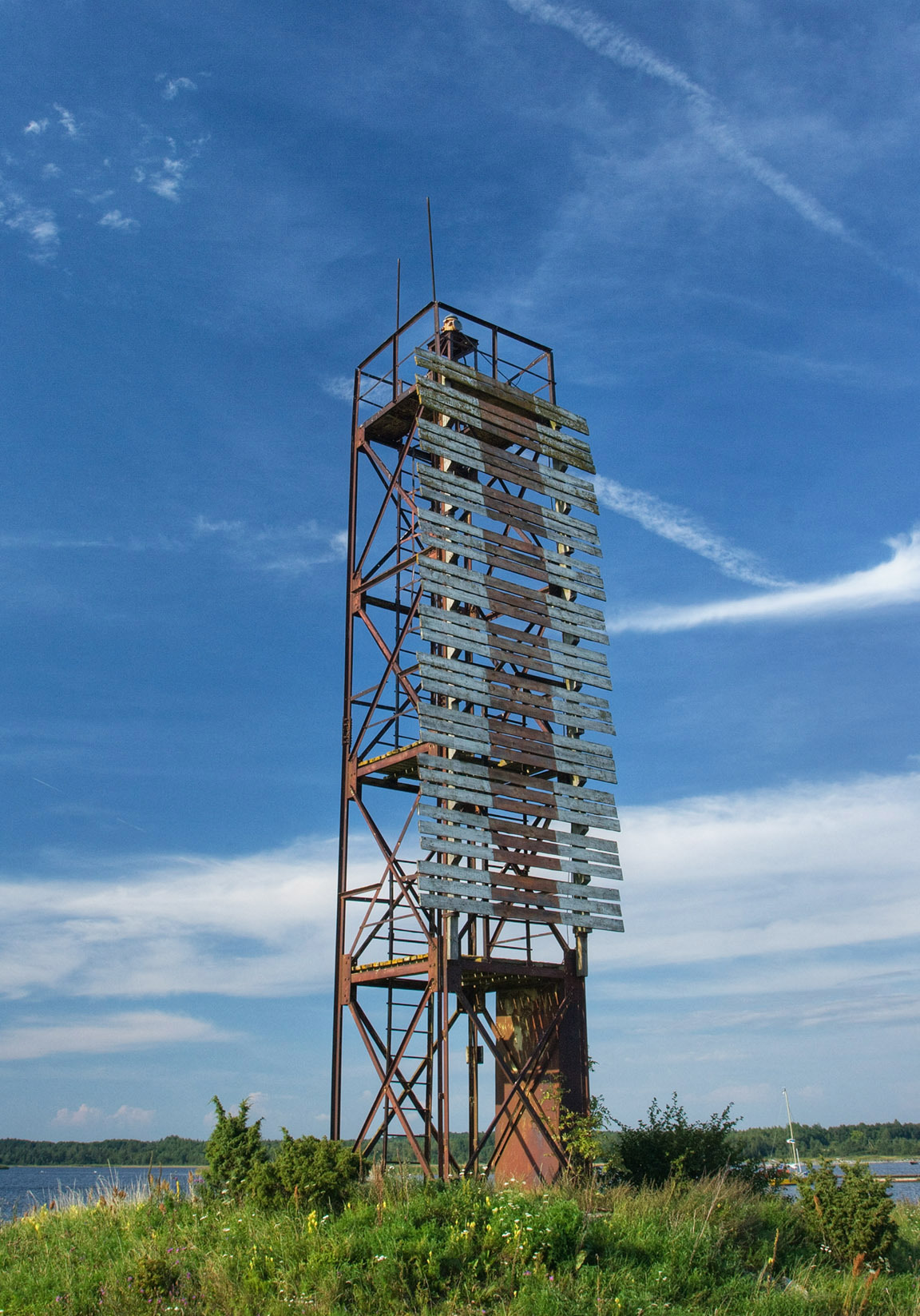
- Kõiguste rear daymark historically helped sailors navigate safely into shallow ports during daylight hours.
- Interactive map of Kõiguste
- Country: Estonia
- County: Saare County
- Parish: Saaremaa Parish
- Time zone: UTC+2 (EET)
  - Summer (DST): UTC+3 (EEST)

Kõiguste is a village in Saaremaa Parish, Saare County in western Estonia.

== Name ==
Kõiguste was attested in historical records referring to persons from the village (Meles van Keikus is tho Tackever in 1453, Keikuste Willem in 1617–1618, and Keykeste Willem in 1622), as well as Keikuß in 1645 (referring to the village) and Köigust in 1798 (referring to the manor). The place name may have originated from a personal name, such as Keyke or Keike. Jaak Simm cites Võnnu Parish Keegu, which appears in written form as Keigo-, Keygo-, comparing it with Finnish keikka ~ keikko ~ keikku (keikas) 'bent upward and backward; rocking, fluttering'.

== History ==
Before the administrative reform in 2017, the village was in Laimjala Parish.

== Natural heritage ==
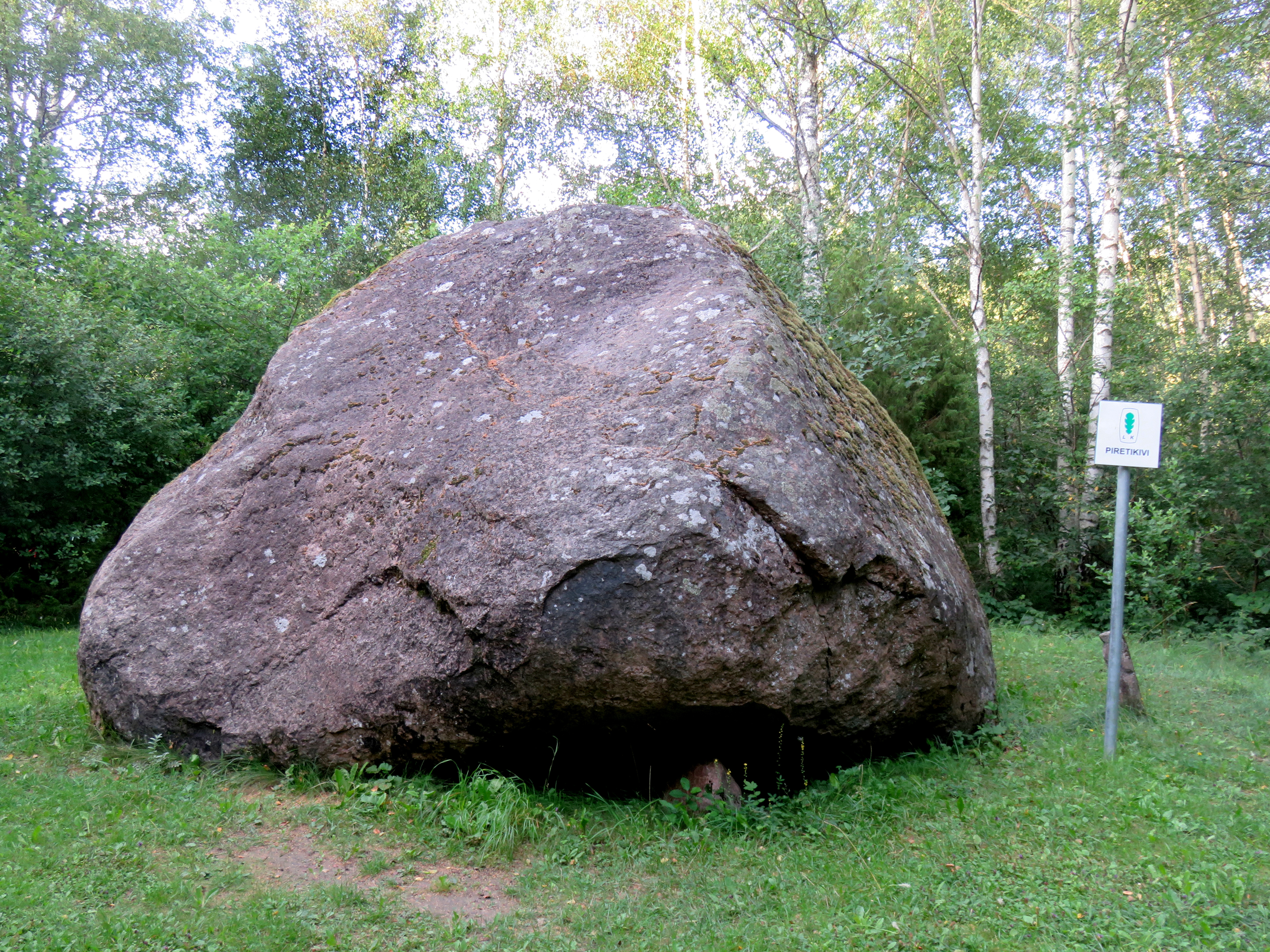
Piret's Stone

There is a glacial erratic boulder in Kõiguste known as Pireti kivi 'Piret's Stone'. The boulder has a circumference of 17.9 meters (59 ft) and a height of 3.8 meters (12 ft).
