= MO-class small guard ship =

1935–45 Soviet ship class

- The MO-4-type patrol boat SKA-065 during World War II

Class overview
- Name: MO class
- Operators: Soviet Navy; Soviet Border Troops
- Succeeded by: OD-200 class
- Subclasses: MO-1, MO-2, MO-3, MO-4, BMO
- Built: 1935–1945
- Completed: 350+

General characteristics (MO-4 type)
- Type: Patrol boat / submarine chaser
- Displacement: 50.6 tonnes (49.8 long tons; 55.8 short tons) standard; 56.5 tonnes (55.6 long tons; 62.3 short tons) full load
- Length: 26.9 m (88 ft 3 in)
- Beam: 4.02 m (13 ft 2 in)
- Draught: 1.35 m (4 ft 5 in)
- Installed power: 2,550 metric horsepower (2,520 hp)
- Propulsion: 3 × GAM-34BS engines; three shafts
- Speed: 26 knots (48 km/h; 30 mph) to 27.4 knots (50.7 km/h; 31.5 mph)
- Complement: 22 men
- Armament: 2 × 45 mm (1.8 in) 21-K guns; 2 × 12.7 mm (0.50 in) DShK machine guns; Two stern depth charge racks with 8 × 165 kg (364 lb) depth charges; 24 × 41 kg (90 lb) depth charges

The MO (Russian: МО, an initialism for Малый охотник, Malyj okhotnik, 'Small Hunter'; nickname Мошка, Moshka, 'Midge') is a class of naval boats produced before and during World War II for the Soviet Navy and the NKVD Border Troops. Their primary function originally was anti-submarine warfare. During the war they carried out many additional roles from supporting landing operations to escorting convoys. Over 350 boats were built.

== Background ==
In early 1930s, the main focus of Soviet shipbuilding was building small patrol ships and boats with various duties. Among them, a large part consisted of submarine hunter boats. The MO class was the first Soviet built submarine hunter boat class, with the abbreviation meaning "Small Hunter". Unlike torpedo boats, MO boats had no torpedo weapons, but instead had depth charge racks.

== Design history ==
=== MO-1, MO-2 and MO-3 types ===
The lead ship of the class was the 51-tonne (50-long-ton; 56-short-ton) border patrol boat PK-139, which was given the class designation of MO-1 in 1935. The production series was a slightly faster boat, given the designation MO-2. Some 27 to 36 boats of this class were built in 1935–1936. A slightly modified MO-3 was in limited production resulting in four boats built.

=== MO-4 type ===
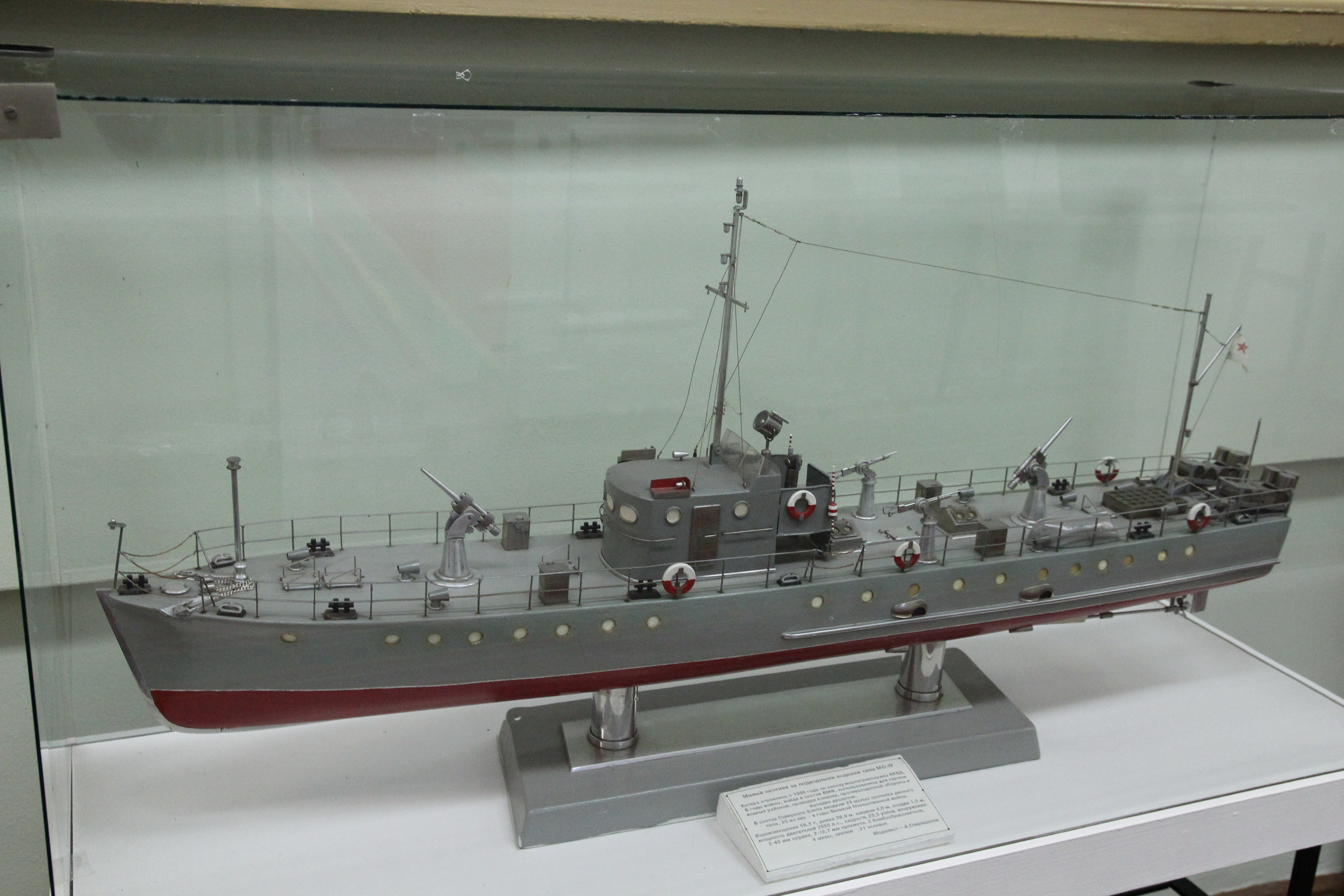
An MO-4-type boat model in the Naval Museum of the Northern Fleet in Murmansk

MO-4 was the most produced type of the class, with approximately 250 built. It was a slightly modified MO-2 variant, with a more vertical stern and slightly lower. It was designed at the Design Bureau of the NKVD Maritime Border Guard Shipyard in Leningrad (from 1939 known as the NKVD's Factory No. 5, now the Almaz Shipbuilding Company). The boat had no armor and had a wooden structure, but consisted of nine sections isolated from each other, allowed to stay afloat even after suffering heavy damage. Three GAM-34BS gasoline engines had a power of 850 metric horsepower (840 hp) at 1,850 rpm or 675 metric horsepower (666 hp) at 1,750 rpm. The main weapons of the boat were depth charges and 45 mm semi-automatic guns. The boats also had a pair of DShK heavy machine guns. MO-4 boats were built at several shipyards including Leningrad, Sosnovka and Astrakhan from 1937 to 1943.

=== BMO type ===
BMO type drawing

In summer 1943, the Leningrad shipyards designed a new variant to remedy the MO-4's lack of armor. The letter B stood for bronirovannyj (Russian: бронированный, lit. 'armored'). The new boat was made of steel, with armor of up to 12 mm (0.47 in) protecting the engine. One of the 45 mm guns was replaced with a 37 mm 70-K anti-aircraft gun, which had higher performance in the anti aircraft role. 48 were built during the war and another 18 in the second half of 1945.

== Service history ==
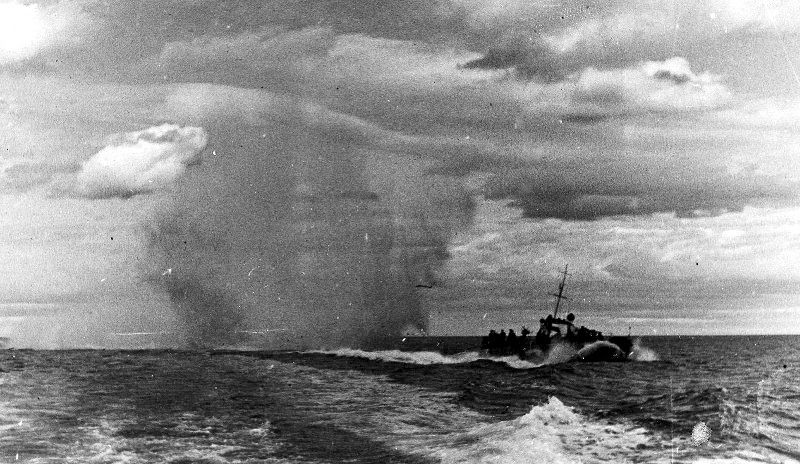
An MO-class boat of the Northern Fleet depth charging a German submarine, 1943

MO-class boats carried out a very large number of duties during the war, serving in all fleets. Their duties included patrolling naval bases perimeter, hunting submarines, escorting convoys, laying and disarming mines, supporting amphibious landings and fighting small enemy ships. Some distinguished individual boats are listed below.

=== MO-103 ===
This is one of the most famous MO-4-type boats. On July 30, 1944 she sank the German submarine U-250 in shallow waters of the Baltic Sea. The commander of U-250 and five crewmen survived and were captured. The submarine was raised by Soviet forces in early September and moved to Leningrad. To the delight of the engineers, the submarine had intact secret acoustic torpedoes on board.

=== MO-144 ===
The MO-4-type boat was earlier named MO-113. Sank the German submarine U-679 on January 9, 1945 in the Baltic Sea.

=== MO-65 ===
The MO-4-type boat was earlier known as PK-125 (while serving in the NKVD Border Troops), SKA-074 and SKA-065 (while serving in the Soviet Navy). The boat was mobilized by the Black Sea Fleet during the Great Patriotic War and it was named the "Guards Boat" on July 25, 1943 for distinguished services in battle (Commanding Officer, Senior Lieutenant Pavel Sivenko, received a lot of Soviet military decorations and was also awarded the Navy Distinguished Service Medal of the United States). Survived until the end of the war and was returned to the NKVD Border Troops in July 1945.

=== SKA-084 ===
The MO-4-type boat was earlier named PK-148 (while serving in the NKVD Border Troops). She was mobilized by the Black Sea Fleet during the Great Patriotic War. The boat destroyed two enemy patrol boats and one aircraft during wartime. The boat also escorted a total of 184 ships on convoying missions and removed 20 sea mines during mine sweeping missions. SKA-084 was the first boat in the Soviet Navy to have the naval 82 mm (3.2 in) Katiusha variant installed. Sunk by artillery fire on September 11, 1943 near Novorossiysk.
