= MV Walmer Castle =

UK cargo liner

Coordinates: 47°16′N 22°25′W

History

1936: *1941: United Kingdom
- Name: Walmer Castle
- Namesake: Walmer Castle
- Owner: Union-Castle Line
- Operator: Union-Castle Line
- Port of registry: London
- Route: Southampton – Bremen – Hamburg
- Builder: Harland and Wolff, Belfast
- Yard number: 983
- Launched: 17 September 1936
- Completed: 30 November 1936
- Out of service: 21 September 1941
- Identification: UK official number 165337; call sign GZDF
- Fate: Damaged by air attack and scuttled 21 September 1941

General characteristics
- Type: Cargo liner
- Tonnage: 906 GRT 350 NRT
- Length: 236.2 ft (72.0 m)
- Beam: 39.3 ft (12.0 m)
- Draught: 14 ft 5 in (4.39 m)
- Depth: 12.5 ft (3.8 m)
- Decks: 2
- Installed power: 539 NHP
- Propulsion: 2-stroke single-acting diesel engine
- Speed: 14 knots (26 km/h)
- Sensors & processing systems: wireless direction finding

MV Walmer Castle was a UK cargo liner. She was launched in 1936 in Northern Ireland, and was the smallest ocean-going ship in the Union-Castle Line fleet. For three years she provided a scheduled weekly cargo feeder service linking Union-Castle liners that terminated at Southampton with the German ports of Bremen and Hamburg.

In the Second World War she first served in the tramp trade with France and in home waters, then in 1940 became an armament supply ship. In 1941 she was converted into a convoy rescue ship. On her first Atlantic convoy an enemy air attack crippled her. After the survivors had abandoned her, Royal Navy ships sank her by gunfire.

== Building ==
Harland and Wolff built Walmer Castle on the Number One slipway of its Queen's Yard in Belfast. She was launched on 17 September 1936 and completed on 30 November. She was 236.2 ft (72.0 m) long, her beam was 39.3 ft (12.0 m) and her draught was 14 ft 5 in (4.39 m).

She was a motor ship with an eight-cylinder two-stroke single-acting diesel engine that was rated at 539 NHP and gave her a service speed of 14 knots (26 km/h).

Walmer Castle replaced the 1,236 GRT Eider, a steamship launched in 1900 that Union-Castle had acquired in 1926 from the Royal Mail Steam Packet Company.

== War service ==
The outbreak of the Second World War in September 1939 immediately ended Walmer Castle's liner service to and from Germany. At first Union-Castle chartered her to companies that specialised in short-sea cargo trade. She traded with French ports first in the Bay of Biscay and later in the English Channel. After France capitulated in June 1940 Walmer Castle carried cement to UK ports to build fortifications against the threat of invasion.

In August 1940 the Admiralty requisitioned Walmer Castle as an armament supply ship and sent her to Scapa Flow, where she arrived in ballast on 11 September in Convoy WN 14 from the Firth of Clyde.

=== Rescue ship ===
In June 1941 Walmer Castle was converted into a convoy rescue ship. She was chosen because she was small, manoeuvreable, and her 14-knot speed would enable her to catch up with 10-knot convoys after stopping to rescue survivors. Convoy rescue ships were called Mercantile Fleet Auxiliaries, had a Merchant Navy crew and flew the Blue Ensign.

Walmer Castle's first deployment as a rescue ship was with Convoy OG 74, which left Liverpool on 12 September 1941 bound for Gibraltar. On 19 September the Irish cargo ship City of Waterford sank after colliding with Dutch cargo ship Thames. The sloop HMS Deptford rescued 23 survivors and transferred them to Walmer Castle.

On 20 September the German submarine U-124 sank the UK cargo ships Empire Moat and Baltallin. Just before midnight Walmer Castle rescued all 30 crew from Empire Moat and 20 survivors from Baltallin.

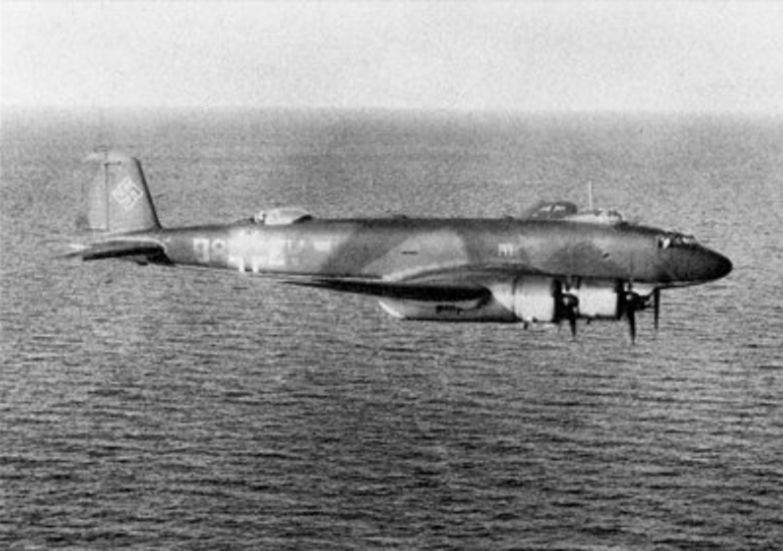
An Fw 200 of I/KG 40 over the ocean

Walmer Castle set off at 12 knots (22 km/h) to catch up the convoy, steering a zigzag course as a precaution against attack. The next day Walmer Castle was 700 miles west of Ushant and had not yet caught up OG 74 when a Focke-Wulf Fw 200 Condor of Kampfgeschwader 40 came out of the sun and attacked her. Walmer Castle's DEMS gunners opened fire on the incoming aircraft and the Master, Gerald Clarke, sharply changed the ship's course, which ensured that the Fw 200's first bomb missed.

The Fw 200 made a second attack run, but Captain Clarke changed Walmer Castle's course and avoided the second bomb. The ship's gunners maintained anti-aircraft fire, and the Fw 200's tail gunner returned fire, killing several members of the crew.

In one attack run, enemy bullets flew down a companionway in Walmer Castle's accommodation block. The chief steward was just coming out of his cabin, but the ship's cook, Herbert Hill, threw himself in front of the steward to save his life. Hill was killed.

In the Fw 200's third attack run Captain Clarke sustained a bullet wound to his stomach but remained at his post. It the fourth attack run a bomb from the Fw 200 destroyed the starboard wing of the bridge, killing Captain Clarke, and penetrated the engine room. The ship's engines were disabled, and with them the ship's water services. The ship was now burning, with no means to fight the fire.

As soon as the attack began, the first radio officer, William McGowan, transmitted a distress signal. As the attack continued, bomb damage trapped him and three crewmates in his cabin. McGowan cleared débris, forced his way out, and rescued all three crewmates, two of whom were badly wounded.

The Chief Officer, Alfred Lawson, was wounded and stunned but recovered and took command and gave the order to abandon ship. He organised a search for survivors in those parts of the ship's accommodation that were still accessible and had not been overtaken by fire. The Boatswain, Alfred Davis, was wounded but helped the Chief Officer to launch the boats and rafts and get survivors into them. So did the Second Steward, Joseph Piccirillo.

The ship's motor boat had been blown away and her number two and number four port lifeboats were badly holed and sank. Survivors from City of Waterford, Empire Moat and Baltallin and wounded crewmen were put on life-rafts and in number three starboard lifeboat. Lawson reserved the last two rafts for injured men. Once the rafts were launched, Lawson and a dozen other men remained on the poop deck.

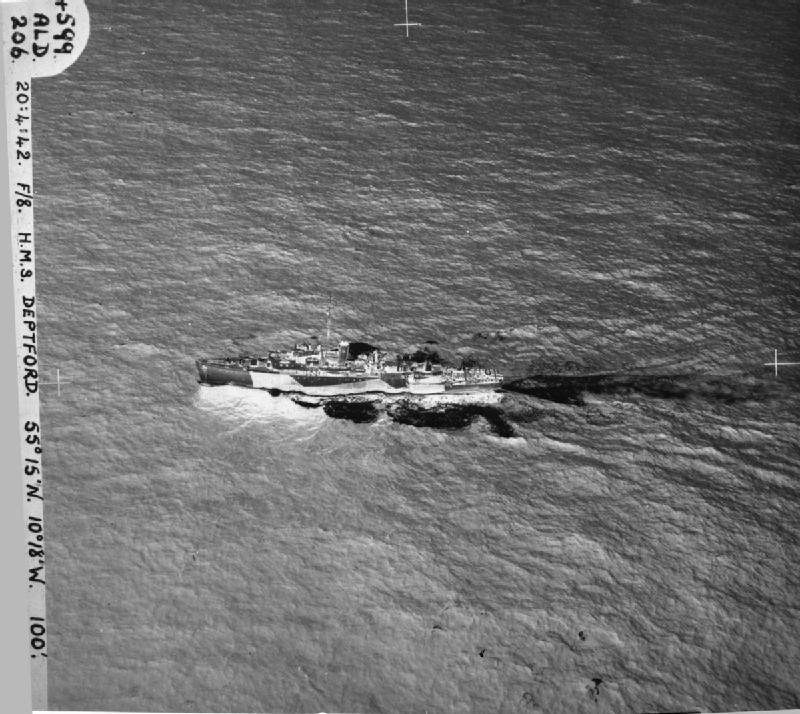
Aerial view of HMS Deptford

Later in the afternoon HMS Deptford and the corvette HMS Marigold arrived and rescued the 13 survivors from the poop deck and 51 survivors from the boats and rafts. By then the fire had turned the side of the ship white hot but she remained afloat, so Deptford and Marigold sank her by gunfire.

=== Honours ===
In January 1942 eight of Walmer Castle's crew were decorated. Chief Officer Lawson was made an MBE. First Radio Officer McGowan was awarded the George Medal. Boatswain Davis and Second Steward Piccirillo were each awarded the BEM.

Captain Clarke and the ship's cook, Herbert Hill, were awarded posthumous commendations. The Third Officer, Thomas Morris, and a gunner, Robert Barrett, were also awarded commendations.

== Bibliography ==
- Murray, Marischal (1953). Union-Castle Chronicle 1853–1953. London: Longmans, Green and Co.
