= Sõmeri =

Island in Estonia

Coordinates: 58°51′N 23°24′E

Sõmeri is an uninhabited island in the Baltic Sea belonging to Estonia. It contains a lighthouse and wildlife reserve.

The island has an area of 41.3 ha.
