= Timeline of the Battle of the Atlantic =

Part of World War II

This is a timeline for the Battle of the Atlantic (1939–1945) in World War II.

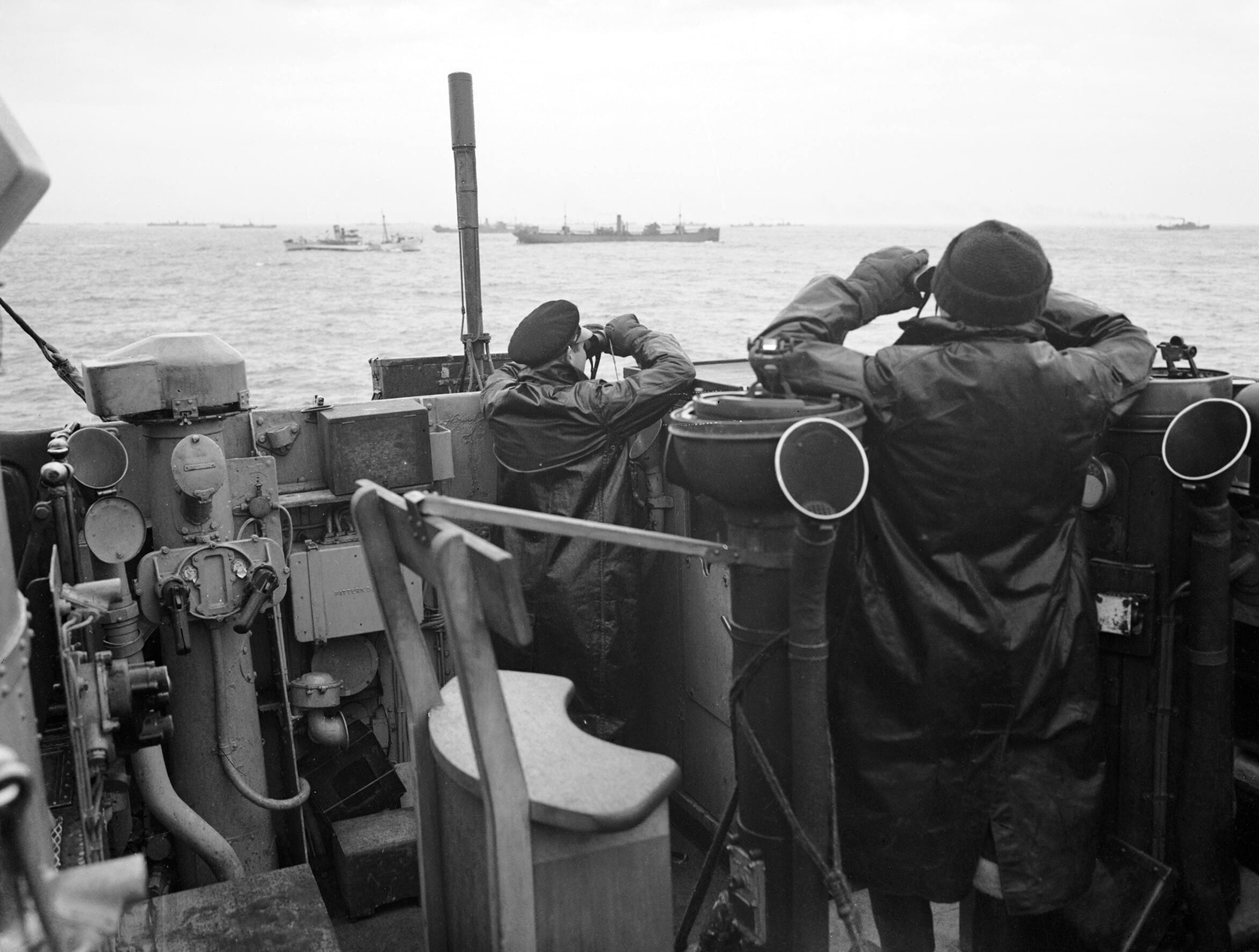
Officers on the bridge of a destroyer, escorting a large convoy of ships keep a sharp look out for attacking enemy submarines during the Battle of the Atlantic. October 1941

== 1939 ==
=== August ===
August 19, 1939

Five U-boats sail from Kiel and nine from Wilhelmshaven to take waiting positions in the North Atlantic.

August 21, 1939

German "pocket battleship" Admiral Graf Spee sails from Wilhelmshaven for a South Atlantic cruise.

August 24, 1939

German "pocket battleship" Deutschland sails from Wilhelmshaven for a North Atlantic cruise.

=== September ===
September 3, 1939

German submarine U-30 sinks the SS Athenia. This attack is interpreted by the United Kingdom as the start of unrestricted submarine warfare. However, in Germany it leads to stricter controls being issued by the Kriegsmarine. Germany at this point had 39 of its 58 U-boats at sea, but this was far less than the 300 which Admiral Karl Dönitz, chief of German submarine forces, considered to be necessary before the opening of war.

September 5, 1939

HMS Neptune stops, evacuates and sinks the German freighter Inn off the Canary Islands.

September 7, 1939

The first convoys sail outbound from the British Isles: OA from the English Channel, OB from Liverpool, and OG to Gibraltar.

September 14, 1939

The first of the SL convoys sails from Freetown.
U-39 attacks the British aircraft carrier HMS Ark Royal, but fails to cause any damage. The aircraft carrier's escorts force U-39 to the surface with depth charges and the crew are taken prisoner.

September 16, 1939

The first Allied convoy sets sail from Halifax, Nova Scotia. Convoy HX 1 contains 18 merchant ships and is escorted by HMCS St. Laurent and HMCS Saguenay to an Atlantic rendezvous with Royal Navy ships HMS Berwick and HMS York.

September 17, 1939

German submarine U-29 sinks the Royal Navy aircraft carrier HMS Courageous.

September 17, 1939

The first Allied "fast convoy" HXF 1 sets sail from Halifax escorted by HMCS Fraser formerly HMS Crescent.

September 20, 1939

U-27 is sunk with depth charges from the British destroyers HMS Fortune and HMS Forester.

September 26, 1939

German media reports the sinking of the British aircraft carrier HMS Ark Royal. However, this report is false: many such reports would be made during the war.

September 30, 1939

German "pocket battleship" Admiral Graf Spee sinks the first merchant ship of its cruise. Total sinkings for its sortie will total nine vessels of 50,000 tons before it becomes embroiled in the Battle of the River Plate.

=== October ===
October 5, 1939

German "pocket battleship" Deutschland sinks the first merchant ship of its cruise.

October 14, 1939

U-47, under Kapitänleutnant Günther Prien, penetrates the British naval base at Scapa Flow, sinking HMS Royal Oak at anchor.

October 16, 1939

Germany begins employing magnetic mines. These cause significant losses to Allied shipping.

October 18, 1939

Germany authorizes submarine attacks against any passenger vessel in a convoy or without lights. President Roosevelt closes U.S. ports and navigable waters to any belligerent submarines.

October 27, 1939

U-34 sinks Malabar from convoy HX 5.

October 30, 1939

U-34 sinks Bronte from convoy OB 25.

=== November ===
November 21, 1939

British light cruiser HMS Belfast hits a German mine, and is seriously damaged while operating in the Firth of Forth.

November 23, 1939

A German magnetic mine is recovered successfully by the Allies, leading to the development of effective countermeasures. The German battleship Scharnhorst sinks the British armed merchant vessel HMS Rawalpindi. The Scharnhorst and the accompanying Gneisenau are forced to abandon their sortie and return to port.

November 25, 1939

U-28 sinks Royston Grange from convoy SL 8.

=== December ===
December 4, 1939

First U-boat lost to an Allied submarine in the war when HMS Salmon sinks U-36 outside Kristiansund in Norway.

December 5, 1939

U-47 sinks Navasota from convoy OB 46.

December 9, 1939

Orion and Widder, first two German auxiliary cruisers, were commissioned.

December 10, 1939

The first Allied troop convoy TC 1 sets sail from Halifax with 7,400 men of the 1st Canadian Infantry Division.

December 14, 1939

Battle of the River Plate - Admiral Graf Spee scuttled after battle with HMS Exeter, HMS Achilles and HMNZS Ajax

== 1940 ==
=== January ===
January 30, 1940

U-55 sinks Vaclite and Keramiai from convoy OA 80G.

=== February ===
February 5, 1940

U-41 sinks Beaverburn from convoy OA 84.

February 14, 1940

The United Kingdom announces armaments will be carried by all passenger ships. Germany responds by announcing that all vessels will be considered warships.

=== March ===
March 16, 1940

A German air raid at Scapa Flow damages a cruiser and causes the first civilian casualties in Britain of the war.

=== April ===
April 9, 1940

Action off Lofoten - brief encounter between Scharnhorst, Gneisenau vs HMS Renown and her destroyer screen. After brief exchange of fire, German battleships disengaged.

=== June ===
June 8, 1940

Operation Juno: HMS Glorious sunk by Scharnhorst and Gneisenau. She became the first aircraft carrier sunk by battleships in naval combat

June 12, 1940

U-46 sinks Willowbank and Barbara Marie from convoy SL 34.

June 14, 1940

U-38 sinks Italia and Erik Boye from convoy HX 47.

June 22, 1940

U-47 sinks San Fernando from convoy HX 49.

June 25, 1940

U-51 sinks Saranac and Windsorwood from convoy OA 172.
Canada loses its first navy vessel during an accident off the coast of France, when HMCS Fraser is cut in two by Royal Navy cruiser HMS Calcutta, with 45 lives lost aboard the Fraser and 19 aboard Calcutta.

June 30, 1940

U-boats sink two ships from convoy SL 36.

=== July ===
July 2, 1940

Aircraft sink Aeneas from convoy OA 177G.

July 4, 1940

Aircraft and E-boats sink five ships from convoy OA 178.

July 8, 1940

U-99 sinks Humber Arm from convoy HX 53.

July 10, 1940

U-61 sinks Alwaki from convoy OA 179.

July 17, 1940

U-boats sink Manipur and Scottish Minstrel from convoy HX 55.

July 26, 1940

U-34 sinks four ships from convoy OB 188.

July 28, 1940

Auxiliary cruiser Thor encountered armed merchant cruiser HMS Alcantara and managed to escape.

July 31, 1940

U-99 sinks Jersey City from convoy OB 191.

=== August ===
BETASOM base opens in Bordeaux for Italian submarine patrols into the Atlantic.

August 4, 1940

U-52 sinks 3 British merchant steamships from convoy HX 60.

August 5, 1940

U-56 sinks Boma from convoy OB 193.

August 15, 1940

A new system of SC convoys is initiated between Canada and the British Isles, to provide convoy protection for slow ships.

August 16, 1940

U-48 sinks Hedrun from convoy OB 197.

August 23, 1940

U-57 sinks Cumberland and St. Dunstan from convoy OB 202.
Aircraft sink Llanishen and Makalla from convoy OA 203.

August 24, 1940

U-37 sinks Blairmore from convoy SC 1.

August 25, 1940

Convoy HX 65 comes under attack by U-boats and aircraft sinking five ships.

August 28, 1940

U-boats sink four ships from convoy HX 66.
U-100 sinks Dalblair and Astra II from convoy OA 204.

August 30, 1940

U-59 torpedoes San Gabriel from convoy OB 205.

August 31, 1940

British destroyers HMS Esk and HMS Ivanhoe are sunk and two other ships damaged by mines in the Texel Disaster with the loss of 300 killed and 100 wounded or taken prisoner.

=== September ===
September 2, 1940

U-46 sinks Thornlea from convoy OB 206.

September 4, 1940

U-47 sinks Titan from convoy OA 207.

September 6, 1940

Aircraft sink St. Glen from convoy SL 44.

September 8, 1940

U-boats sink two ships from convoy SC 2.

September 15, 1940

U-48 sinks Alexandrios and Empire Volunteer from convoy SC 3.
Aircraft sink Nailsea River from convoy SL 45.

September 17, 1940

U-65 sinks Tregenna from convoy HX 71.

September 18, 1940

U-48 sinks Marina and City of Benares from convoy OB 213.

September 20, 1940

U-138 sinks four ships from convoy OB 216.

September 21, 1940

U-boats sink six ships from convoy HX 72.

September 26, 1940

U-137 sinks Manchester Brigade and Stratford from convoy OB 218.

September 27, 1940

Aircraft sink Port Denison from convoy OA 220.

September 28, 1940

Aircraft sink Dalveen from convoy HX 73.
U-32 sinks Empire Ocelot from convoy OB 218.

=== October ===
October 9, 1940

U-103 sinks three ships from convoy SC 6.

October 11, 1940

U-boats sink six ships from convoy HX 77.

October 14, 1940

U-98 sinks Hurunui from convoy OA 228.

October 15, 1940

U-138 sinks Bonheur from convoy OB 228.

October 17, 1940

U-93 sinks Dokka and Uskbridge from convoy OB 228.

October 18, 1940

Minelaying begins on the Allied Northern Barrage minefield between Scotland and Greenland.

October 19, 1940

U-boats sink ten ships from convoy HX 79 and fifteen ships from convoy SC 7.

October 22, 1940

HMCS Margaree, recently acquired to replace HMCS Fraser, is sunk in a collision with the freighter MV Port Fairy 480 km west of Ireland. 142 men are lost, including the captain and four other officers.

=== November ===
November 5, 1940

German "pocket battleship" Admiral Scheer sinks five ships from convoy HX 84 and the escorting armed merchant cruiser HMS Jervis Bay.
U-99 sinks Scottish Maiden from convoy HX 83.

November 6, 1940

Aircraft sink Nalon from convoy SL 52F.

November 15, 1940

Aircraft sink Apapa from convoy SL 53.

November 21, 1940

U-103 sinks Daydawn and Victoria from convoy OB 244.

November 22, 1940

U-123 sinks King Idwal from convoy OB 244.

November 23, 1940

U-100 sinks six ships from convoy SC 11.

=== December ===
December 1, 1940

U-boats sink nine ships from convoy HX 90.
HMCS Saguenay is the first Canadian naval vessel hit by torpedo in the Battle of the Atlantic, attacked 300 miles west of Ireland by a submarine while escorting Convoy HG 47.

December 5, 1940

Auxiliary cruiser Thor encountered armed merchant cruiser HMS Carnarvon Castle and heavily damaged it in brief exchange of fire

December 11, 1940

U-96 sinks three ships from convoy HX 92.

December 24, 1940

Convoy WS 5A attacked by Admiral Hipper, but cruiser escort of HMS Berwick and two light cruisers drove her off

December 27, 1940

Italian submarine Enrico Tazzoli sinks Ardanbhan from convoy OB 263.

== 1941 ==
=== January ===
January 16, 1941

Aircraft sink two ships from convoy OB 274.

January 22, 1941

Operation Berlin: a sortie of Scharnhorst and Gneisenau into North Atlantic resulting in 22 sunk or captured merchant ships

January 29, 1941

U-93 sinks three ships from convoy SC 19.

=== February ===
February 12, 1941

German cruiser Admiral Hipper sinks seven ships from convoy SL 64S.

February 19, 1941

Aircraft sink three ships from convoy OB 287.

February 24, 1941

U-97 sinks three ships from convoy OB 289.

February 26, 1941

Aircraft sink eight ships from convoy OB 290.

February 27, 1941

U-47 sinks Kasongo and Borgland from convoy OB 290.

=== March ===
March 1, 1941

U-552 sinks Cadillac from convoy HX 109.
Aircraft sink Rotula from convoy SC 22.

March 7, 1941

U-boats sink three ships from convoy OB 293.

March 8, 1941

U-boats sink five ships from convoy SL 67.

March 13, 1941

Aircraft sink Empire Frost from convoy SC 23.

March 16, 1941

U-99 sinks five ships from convoy HX 112.

March 17, 1941

U-boats sink six ships from convoy SL 68.

March 19, 1941

Aircraft sink Benvorlich from convoy OB 298.

March 22, 1941

Operation Berlin ends by Scharnhorst-class battleships arriving in occupied France

March 29, 1941

U-48 sinks three ships from convoy HX 115.

=== April ===
April 1, 1941

Aircraft sink two ships from convoy HX 114.

April 3, 1941

U-boats sink six ships from convoy SC 26.

April 4, 1941

Auxiliary cruiser Thor sighted and destroyed armed merchant cruiser HMS Voltaire in combat

April 6, 1941

Aircraft sink Dunstan from convoy OB 306.

April 9, 1941

The United States occupies Greenland.

April 16, 1941

Aircraft sink Swedru from convoy SL 69.

April 28, 1941

U-boats sink four ships from convoy HX 121.

=== May ===
May 8, 1941

U-boats sink five ships from convoy OB 318.
Auxiliary cruiser Pinguin was sunk by HMS Cornwall, becoming first German auxiliary cruiser lost in World War Two

May 11, 1941

Aircraft sink Somerset from convoy SL 72.

May 14, 1941

Aircraft sink Karlander from convoy OB 321.

May 20, 1941

U-boats sink nine ships from convoy HX 126.
Italian submarine Otaria sinks Starcross from convoy SL 73.

May 21 or 22, 1941

Bismarck, Prinz Eugen, and three escorting destroyers leave Bergen and head toward the Arctic Ocean.

May 24, 1941

Bismarck and Prinz Eugen intercepted by battleship HMS Prince of Wales and battlecruiser HMS Hood; Battle of Denmark Strait begins.
Bismarck sinks HMS Hood, then badly damages HMS Prince of Wales, forcing it to retreat.

May 27, 1941.

Bismarck sunk in battle with HMS King George V, HMS Rodney, HMS Dorsetshire and HMS Devonshire

=== June ===
June 1, 1941

The United States Coast Guard begins the Greenland Patrol.

June 11, 1941

Aircraft sink Baron Carnegie from convoy OB 334.

June 13, 1941

Italian submarine Brin sinks Djurdjura and Eirini Kyriakidou from convoy SL 76.
Newfoundland Escort Force is created under the command of Admiral Murray based at St John's Newfoundland, to provide escort cover from the coast of Canada to Iceland.

June 24, 1941

U-203 sinks Schie and Kinross from convoy OB 336.
U-boats sink five ships from convoy HX 133.

June 26, 1941

U-boats sink four ships from convoy SL 78.

=== July ===
July 7, 1941

President Roosevelt announces that US warships will henceforth protect US merchant vessels in the North Atlantic, and the US effectively joined the Battle of the Atlantic.

=== August ===
August 5, 1941

U-boats sink five ships from convoy SL 81.

August 21, 1941

"The Dervish", first Arctic convoy, sailed from Iceland arriving Russia 10 days later.

=== September ===
September 10, 1941

While U-boats sink fifteen ships from convoy SC 42, Canadian corvettes HMCS Moose Jaw and HMCS Chambly sink U-501 by depth charges and ramming in the Denmark Strait south of Tasiilaq, Greenland. This is Canada's first U-boat kill of the Battle of the Atlantic.

September 15, 1941

Aircraft sink Daru from convoy SL 85.

September 19, 1941

HMCS Levis is the first Canadian corvette sunk during the war. Levis is hit by a torpedo while escorting Convoy SC 44 off the coast of Greenland. Four merchant ships are also sunk from the convoy by U-boats.

September 22, 1941

U-boats sink seven ships from convoy SL 87.

=== October ===
October 16, 1941

U-boats sink nine ships from convoy SC 48.

October 21, 1941

U-82 sinks Serbino and Treverbyn from convoy SL 89.

October 31, 1941

U-552 torpedoes USS Reuben James, which was escorting Convoy HX 156. Reuben James is the first United States warship sunk during World War II.

=== November ===
November 3, 1941

U-boats sink nine ships from convoy SC 52.

November 22, 1941

Auxiliary cruiser Atlantis intercepted and sunk by HMS Devonshire

=== December ===
December 10, 1941

U-130 sinks three ships from convoy SC 57.

== 1942 ==
=== January ===
January 12, 1942

SS Cyclops is sunk 160 miles south of Halifax, heralding the start of a U-boat campaign that saw approximately 200 merchant vessels sunk within 10 miles of the east coast of the US.

January 30, 1942

Convoy SC 67 departs from Halifax and picks up a transatlantic escort in Newfoundland, which accompanies the convoy as far as Northern Ireland. This marks the start of the allied end-to-end convoy escort system, which remained in effect until the end of the war.

=== February ===
February 10, 1942

U-136 sinks Heina from convoy SC 67.

February 15, 1942

30 miles southwest of Cape Henry German submarine U-432 sinks Brazilian steamer Buarque (which became the 1st of 36 Brazilian merchant ships that would be sunk in WWII).

February 16, 1942

Operation Neuland opens with attacks on Aruba, Curaçao and Lake Maracaibo petroleum facilities.

=== March ===
March 20, 1942

A new system of BX and XB convoys is initiated between Halifax and Boston, to counter the U-boat campaign along the east coast of the US.

March 28, 1942

Convoy PQ 13 attacked by German destroyers and U-boats; in following action cruiser HMS Trinidad and 5 transports were sunk

=== April ===
April 30, 1942

HMS Edinburgh was hit by two torpedoes from U-456 while escorting convoy QP 11 with cargo of gold onboard. 2 days later three German destroyers attacked and severely damaged her, forcing crew to abandon the ship.

=== May ===
May 12, 1942

U-128 sinks Denpark from convoy SL 109.

May 18–22, 1942

Along Natal coast, although damaged the Italian submarine Barbarigo manage to escape two times of attacks done by Brazilians B-25, after have unsuccessfully tried to sink Brazilian merchant ship "Comandante Lyra" at May 18.

=== June ===
June 10, 1942

U-553 torpedoes and sinks the British freighter Nicoya at the mouth of the St. Lawrence River several kilometres off Anticosti Island, followed by the Dutch freighter Leto

=== July ===
July 4, 1942

Convoy PQ 17 is scattered in the Barents Sea leading to the loss of 22 Allied merchant ships.

July 5, 1942

Six ships are sunk when convoy QP 13 strays into Allied minefield SN72 in the Denmark Strait.

July 6, 1942

German submarine U-132 sinks three freighters off the Gaspé coast

=== August ===
August 8, 1942

U-boats sink eleven ships from convoy SC 94.

August 15, 1942

U-705 sinks Balladier from convoy SC 95.

August 16, 1942

U-507 sinks Baependy, a Brazilian merchant ship, killing 270 civilians. A few hours later, the same U-507 sinks another Brazilian passenger ship, the SS Araraquara, killing another 131 people, followed hours later by the SS Annibal Benevolo, on which 150 civilians drowned.

August 17, 1942

U-507 continues its slaughter, sinking another Brazilian merchant ship, the SS Itagiba at the city of Vitória, killing 36,
and the SS Arara similarly sunk with 20 deaths as she picked up the survivors of the Itagiba.
U-boats sink four ships from convoy SL 118.

August 19, 1942

U-507 sinks the tiny sailing vessel Jacyra.

August 22, 1942

U-507 sinks Hammeran, a Swedish merchant ship. In just one week, U-507 acting in Brazilian waters killed over 600 people, all of them neutral civilians. As result, Brazil declares war on Germany and Italy at that very same day.

August 28, 1942

U-566 sinks Zuiderkerk and City of Cardiff from convoy SL 119.

August 31, 1942

U-609 sinks Bronxville and Capira from convoy SC 97.

=== September ===
September 9, 1942

USS Muskeget, a Coast Guard weather ship, is torpedoed near Weather Station #2, Lat. 54^{o} N, Long 44^{o} 30'W by U-755. 121 Officers and crew lost, including one Public Health Service officer and four weathermen, no survivors.

September 12, 1942

Convoy PQ 18 continuously attacked by U-boats and aircraft until September 21; 13 merchantmen were sunk at the price of 4 U-boats.

September 14, 1942

HMCS Ottawa is torpedoed by U-91 while escorting Convoy ON 127 500 nautical miles (930 km) east of St. John's, Newfoundland. 114 crew lost their lives, including the commanding officer, while 65 survivors were rescued by nearby vessels.

September 20, 1942

U-596 sinks Empire Hartebeeste from convoy SC 100.

September 22, 1942

U-617 sinks Athelsultan and Tennessee from convoy SC 100.

=== October ===
October 4, 1942

U-254 sinks Robert H Colley from convoy HX 209.

October 13, 1942

U-boats sink seven ships from convoy SC 104.

October 14, 1942

Newfoundland Railway passenger ferry SS Caribou is torpedoed by the U-69, in Cabot Strait
Auxiliary cruiser Komet sunk by British torpedo boats in her attempt to break into Atlantic

October 24, 1942

A new system of UG convoys is initiated between Chesapeake Bay and the Mediterranean Sea, to support the Allied invasion of North Africa.

October 25, 1942

Battle of convoy SL 125 begins as a tactical diversion to clear U-boats from the path of Operation Torch invasion convoys.

October 27, 1942

U-boats sink five ships from convoy HX 212.

=== November ===
November 2, 1942

U-boats sink fifteen ships from convoy SC 107.

November 18, 1942

U-43 sinks Brilliant from convoy SC 109.

=== December ===
December 8, 1942

U-boats sink two ships from convoy HX 217.

December 31, 1942

Battle of Barents Sea: Kriegsmarine attempted to intercept convoy JW 51B. Admiral Hipper and Lützow with destroyer screen sailed from Norway, but Hipper was intercepted and damaged by HMS Sheffield and HMS Jamaica, and Lützow failed to find a target. This failure led to temporary suspend of Kriegsmarine surface vessel operations.

== 1943 ==
=== January ===
January 3, 1943

U-507 sinks the British ship Baron Dachmont.

January 8, 1943

U-507 sinks the British ship Yorkwood.

January 13, 1943

U-507 was sunk by the US PBY Catalina VP-83.

January 17, 1943

U-268 sinks Vestfold from convoy HX 222.

January 26, 1943

U-358 sinks Nortind from convoy HX 223.

=== February ===
February 2, 1943

U-223 sinks SS Dorchester from convoy SG 19 killing 675 men.
U-456 sinks Inverilen and Jeremiah Van Rensselaer from convoy HX 224.

February 7, 1943

U-boats sink nine ships from convoy SC 118.

February 15, 1943

A new system of fast CU convoys is initiated to speed the flow of petroleum products from Caribbean Sea refineries to Liverpool.

=== March ===
March 7, 1943

U-boats sink seven ships for convoy SC 121.

March 10, 1943

U-boats sink four ships from convoy HX 228.

March 16, 1943

The largest convoy battle of World War II begins around convoys HX 229 and SC 122.

March 28, 1943

U-boats sink four ships from convoy SL 126.

=== April ===
April 4, 1943

U-boats sink three ships from convoy HX 231.

April 12, 1943

U-563 sinks three ships from convoy HX 232.

April 17, 1943

U-boats sink Fort Rampart from convoy HX 233.

April 22, 1943

U-306 sinks Amerika from convoy HX 234.

=== May ===
May 6, 1943

The battle for convoy ONS 5 reaches a climax with the destruction of seven U-boats.

May 7, 1943

U-89 sinks Laconikos from convoy SL 128MK.

May 11, 1943

U-402 sinks Antigone and Grado from convoy SC 129.

=== July ===
July 31, 1943

In a coordinated action, one American and two Brazilian maritime patrol aircraft sink the then modern U-199.

=== September ===
September 8, 1943

Italy surrenders, and Britain starts to redeploy their Mediterranean destroyers to the Atlantic.

=== October ===
October 9, 1943

U-645 sinks Yorkmar from convoy SC 143.

October 22, 1943

Battle of Sept-Îles : HMS Charybdis and six destroyers caught in ambush by German fleet torpedo boats, resulting in loss of the cruiser and one destroyer with no casualties in German forces

October 31, 1943

U-262 sinks Hallfried from convoy SL 138MK.

=== December ===
December 26, 1943

Battle of the North Cape: Ships of the Royal Navy (HMS Duke of York, HMS Norfolk, HMS Belfast and HMS Sheffield) sink the German battleship Scharnhorst off Norway's North Cape in her attempt to intercept convoy JW 55B

== 1944 ==
=== April ===
April 6, 1944

U-302 sinks Ruth I and South America from convoy SC 156.

=== July ===
July 20, 1944

U-861 sinks the freighter-troopship Vital de Oliveira, the only Brazilian military ship sunk due to submarine action at WWII, and the last Brazilian vessel to be torpedoed in that war.

=== August ===
August 3, 1944

The largest convoy of World War II, convoy HX 300, arrives in the British Isles without loss.

=== September ===
September 8, 1944

U-482 sinks Empire Heritage and Pinto from convoy HX 305.

== 1945 ==
=== January ===
January 27, 1945

U-825 sinks Solor from convoy HX 332.

=== March ===
March 2, 1945

U-1302 sinks Novasli and King Edgar from convoy SC 167.

=== April ===
April 18, 1945

U-1107 sinks Empire Gold and Cyrus H McCormick from convoy HX 348.

== Month-by-month summaries ==
=== 1939 ===
- September

Allied shipping losses total 53 vessels. 41 vessels totaling 153,800 tons are lost to submarines. German losses are two submarines.

- October

Allied shipping losses total 196,000 tons. German losses are five submarines.

- November

Allied shipping losses to submarines are 21 vessels totaling 51,600 tons. More than 100,000 tons are lost to German mines.

- December

Allied shipping losses are 73 vessels totaling 189,900 tons. 25 are sunk by submarines. The Germans lose one submarine.

Total Allied losses to mines during 1939 are 79 vessels totaling 262,700 tons.

=== 1940 ===
- January

Allied losses are 73 vessels totaling 214,500 tons, of which 40 vessels totaling 111,200 tons are sunk by submarines. Germany has 38 operational submarines to begin the year.

- February

Allied losses are 226,900 tons, of which 45 vessels totaling 169,500 tons are lost to submarines.

- March

Allied losses are 45 vessels, of which 23 are lost to submarines. Germany loses three submarines.

- October

Massacre of Convoy SC 7

=== 1941 ===
- June

Allied losses are 590,000 tons

=== 1943 ===
- March

Allied shipping losses are 627,000 tons.

- April

Closing of Mid-Atlantic gap

- May

Allied shipping losses are 157,000 tons, and 37 U-boats are sunk plus 32 damaged.
U-boats withdrawn Black May

- June

17 U-boats destroyed

- July

46 U-boats destroyed

- August

20 U-boats destroyed
