= HMCS Alberni =

Flower-class corvette

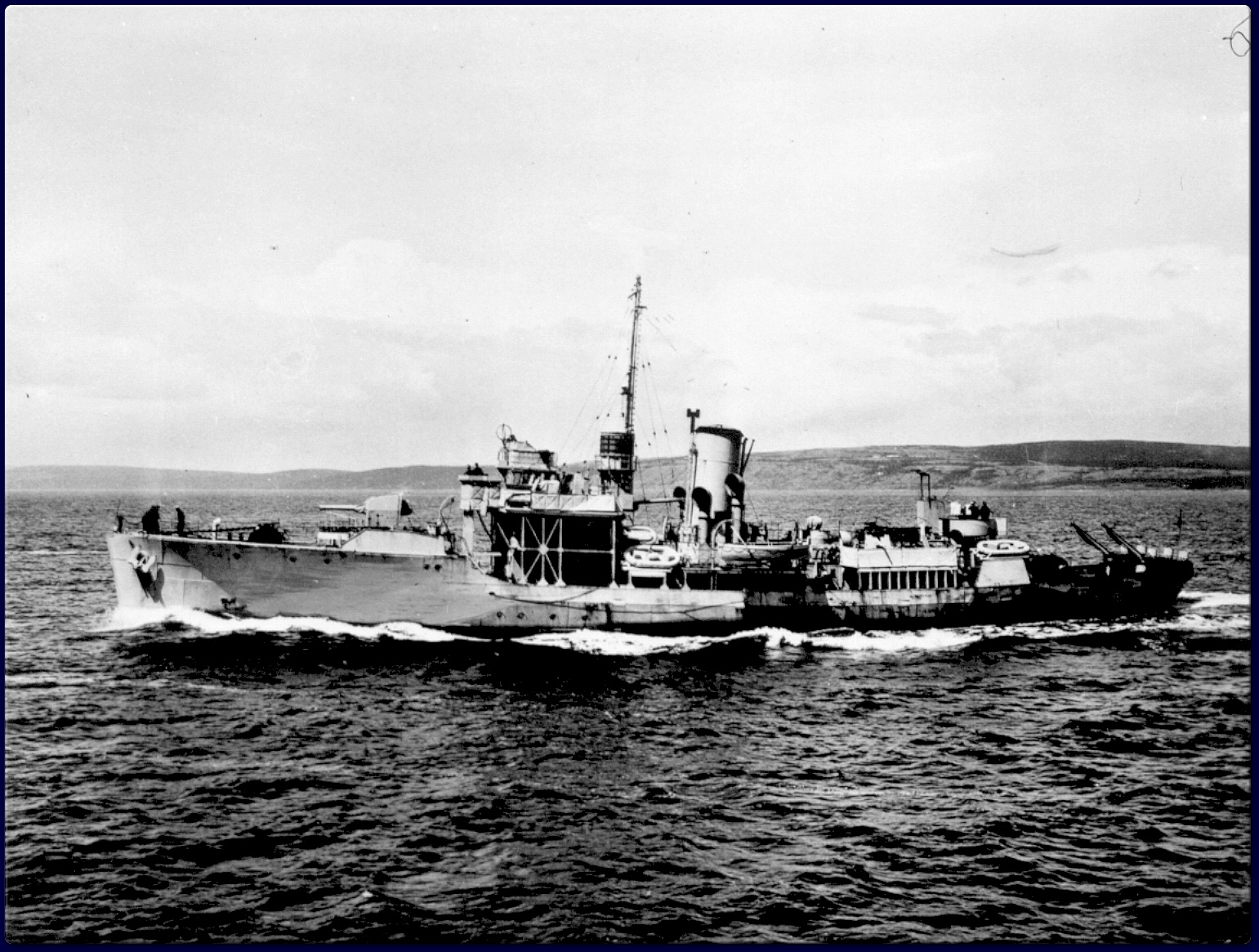
- HMCS Alberni, circa 1943–1944

History

Canada
- Name: Alberni
- Namesake: Alberni, British Columbia
- Ordered: 14 February 1940
- Builder: Yarrows Ltd., Esquimalt
- Laid down: 29 April 1940
- Launched: 22 August 1940
- Commissioned: 4 February 1941
- Identification: Pennant number: K103
- Honours and awards: Atlantic 1941-44; Normandy 1944; North Sea 1944
- Fate: Torpedoed and sunk on 21 August 1944

General characteristics
- Class & type: Flower-class corvette
- Displacement: 950 long tons (970 t)
- Length: 205 ft 1 in (62.51 m) o/a
- Beam: 33 ft 1 in (10.08 m)
- Draught: 13 ft 5 in (4.09 m)
- Propulsion: Single shaft; 2 × fire tube Scotch boilers; 1 × 4-cycle triple-expansion reciprocating steam engine; 2,800 ihp (2,100 kW)
- Speed: 16 knots (30 km/h; 18 mph)
- Range: 3,500 nmi (6,500 km; 4,000 mi) at 12 knots (22 km/h; 14 mph)
- Complement: 85
- Sensors & processing systems: 1 × SW1C or 2C radar; 1 × Type 123A or Type 127DV sonar
- Armament: 1 × BL 4-inch (102 mm) Mk.IX single gun; 2 × single .50 cal machine guns; 2 × single Lewis .303 cal machine guns; 2 × Mk.II depth charge throwers; 2 × depth charge rails with 40 depth charges; Fitted with minesweeping gear

HMCS Alberni was a Flower-class corvette that served in the Royal Canadian Navy (RCN) during the Second World War. The Flower-class corvettes were warships designed for anti-submarine warfare. The ship was constructed by Yarrows Ltd. in Esquimalt, British Columbia, laid down on 19 April 1940, launched on 22 August and commissioned on 4 February 1941. The corvette sailed east to join the RCN's fleet in the Atlantic via the Panama Canal, where, upon arrival, the vessel began escorting trans-atlantic convoys in the Battle of the Atlantic. Alberni took part in the key convoy battle of Convoy SC 42. In 1942, the corvette was transferred to Allied convoy assignments associated with Operation Torch in the Mediterranean Sea. In 1944, Alberni was among the Canadian naval vessels assigned to Operation Neptune, the naval component of the invasion of Normandy and escorted support ships to and from the United Kingdom on D-day.

On 21 August 1944, while performing an anti-submarine patrol east of the D-day landing site, Alberni was torpedoed and sunk by the German submarine U-480. The ship sank quickly and 59 sailors were killed, with the remaining crew being rescued by Royal Navy motor torpedo boats. A maritime museum in Courtenay, British Columbia now honours the name of the ship and its dead.

== Design and description ==
Flower-class corvettes like Alberni serving with the Royal Canadian Navy (RCN) during the Second World War were different from earlier and more traditional sail-driven corvettes. The Flower-class corvettes originated from a need that arose in 1938 to expand the Royal Navy following the Munich Crisis. A design request went out for a small escort for coastal convoys. Based on a traditional whaler-type design, the initial Canadian ships of the Flower class had a standard displacement of 950 long tons (970 t). They were 205 feet 1 inch (62.51 m) long overall with a beam of 33 feet 1 inch (10.08 m) and a maximum draught of 13 feet 5 inches (4.09 m). The initial 1939–1940 corvettes were powered by a four-cylinder vertical triple expansion engine powered by steam from two Scotch boilers turning one three-bladed propeller rated at 2,800 indicated horsepower (2,100 kW). The Scotch boilers were replaced with water-tube boilers in later 1939–1940 and 1940–1941 Programme ships. The corvettes had a maximum speed of 16 knots (30 km/h; 18 mph). This gave them a range of 3,450 nautical miles (6,390 km; 3,970 mi) at 12 knots (22 km/h; 14 mph). The vessels were extremely wet.

The Canadian Flower-class vessels were initially armed with a Mk IX BL 4-inch (102 mm) gun forward on a CP 1 mounting and carried 100 rounds per gun. The corvettes were also armed with a QF Vickers 2-pounder (40 mm, 1.6 in) gun on a bandstand aft, two single-mounted .303 Vickers machine guns or Browning 0.5-calibre machine guns for anti-aircraft defence and two twin-mounted .303 Lewis machine guns, usually sited on bridge wings. For anti-submarine warfare, they mounted two depth charge throwers and initially carried 25 depth charges. The corvettes were designed with a Type 123 ASDIC sonar set installed. The Flower-class ships had a complement of 47 officers and ratings. The Royal Canadian Navy initially ordered 54 corvettes in 1940 and these were fitted with Mark II Oropesa minesweeping gear used for destroying contact mines. Part of the depth charge rails were made portable so the minesweeping gear could be utilised.

=== Modifications ===
In Canadian service the vessels were altered due to experience with the design's deficiencies. The galley was moved further back in the ship and the mess and sleeping quarters combined. A direction-finding set was installed and enlarged bilge keels were installed to reduce rolling. After the first 35–40 corvettes had been constructed, the foremast was shifted aft of the bridge and the mainmast was eliminated. Corvettes were first fitted with basic SW-1 and SW-2 CQ surface warning radar, notable for their fishbone-like antenna and reputation for failure in poor weather or in the dark. The compass house was moved further aft and the open-type bridge was situated in front of it. The ASDIC hut was moved in front and to a lower position on the bridge. The improved Type 271 radar was placed aft, with some units receiving Type 291 radar for air search. The minesweeping gear, a feature of the first 54 corvettes, was removed. Most Canadian Flower-class corvettes had their forecastles extended which improved crew accommodation and seakeeping. Furthermore, the sheer and flare of the bow was increased, which led to an enlarged bridge. This allowed for the installation of Oerlikon 20 mm (0.8 in) cannon, replacing the Browning and Vickers machine guns. Some of the corvettes were rearmed with Hedgehog anti-submarine mortars. The complements of the ships grew throughout the war rising from the initial 47 to as many as 104.

== Construction and career ==
Alberni was ordered on 14 February 1940 from Yarrows Ltd. in Esquimalt, British Columbia and the ship's keel was laid down on 19 April. She was launched on 22 August 1940 and commissioned into the RCN on 4 February 1941 at Esquimalt. (Note: Helgason has the ship laid down on 29 April.) The ship was named after Alberni, British Columbia. The town of Alberni later merged with nearby Port Alberni to create one town after the tsunami of 1964 which originated in Alaska and wiped out much of Alberni.

Alberni sailed to the Panama Canal and joined the RCN's Atlantic Fleet in Halifax arriving in April 1941. She was assigned to the Newfoundland Escort Force in May 1941 and tasked as a mid-ocean convoy escort in the western North Atlantic in the Battle of the Atlantic. The corvette played a role in escorting Convoy SC 42 in September 1941. The convoy was escorted by the all-Canadian Escort Group 24, comprising the destroyer Skeena, and the corvettes Alberni, Kenogami and Orillia. The convoy passed through poor weather which prevented it from going around the German patrol line "Markgraf", stationed across their route. The patrol was a group of U-boats positioned along convoy routes kept moving by commands from shore to avoid detection by convoy escorts. The convoy, comprising 64 merchant vessels came under attack from 9–14 September during which 16 ships were torpedoed. Orillia was tasked with taking one torpedoed tanker in tow back to harbour. Alberni and Skeena damaged the German submarine U-85 with depth charges. On 10 September the convoy escort was augmented by the arrival of two further Canadian corvettes Chambly and Moose Jaw. Their undetected arrival allowed them to surprise U-501 and sink the sub. With the additional ships, the escort was able to form two rings around the convoy, making it more difficult to attack the merchant vessels. The escort was further augmented by four corvettes and a naval trawler on 11 September. Five British destroyers joined the escort on 11 September, shifting from escorting the convoy ON 13F. Two of the British destroyers sank U-207 on 11 September. With the escort further augmented by another trawler on 12 September Skeena, Alberni and Kenogami were sent to refuel at Hvalfjord, Iceland, ending their part in the convoy battle. The corvette continued escorting subsequent North Atlantic convoys until May 1942. On 3 May 1942, Alberni, along with the destroyer HMCS Assiniboine, rescued 47 survivors from the British tanker British Workman that was torpedoed and sunk by U-455 southeast of Cape Race. This was followed by a minor refit in May 1942 where her boilers were replaced.

From October 1942 until February 1943, Alberni was allocated for Operation Torch duties in and around the Mediterranean Sea, escorting convoys to and from Gibraltar and the United Kingdom. On 27 October 1942, Alberni, rescued 12 survivors from the American tanker Gurney E. Newlin that had been torpedoed and damaged by U-436. Gurney E. Newlin was sunk the following day by U-606. The next day, 28 October, Alberni, along with HMCS Ville de Quebec, rescued 81 survivors from the British whaling ship Sourabaya that had been torpedoed and sunk the previous day by U-436. Alberni returned from Torch duties in March 1943 and briefly served with the Western Local Escort Force before an assignment with Quebec Force. She spent the next five months escorting Quebec-Labrador convoys. She had one major refit in November 1943 at Liverpool, Nova Scotia which took until early February to complete. She was among the few Canadian Flower-class vessels not to have her forecastle extended. After workups in Bermuda following her refit, Alberni joined the Royal Navy-commanded escort group EG 4. In April 1944, she was reassigned to Western Approaches Command for a part in Operation Neptune, the naval aspect of the D-day landings. In July, the corvette took part in the landings, escorting assorted support vessels across the English Channel. On 26 July, the ship shot down a German Junkers Ju 88 aircraft, with the Ju 88 striking the water 100 yards (91 m) aft of the ship.

=== Sinking ===
Returning from invasion duties, the corvette was tasked to relieve HMCS Drumheller on anti-submarine patrols in the English Channel to the east of the D-day landing area. On 21 August Alberni was torpedoed and sunk by U-480, commanded by Hans-Joachim Förster, in the Channel at 50°18′N 00°51′W. The submarine was coated in a rubber anechoic tile that absorbed ASDIC signals and limited detection, and the sinking marked the first Allied ship to be sunk using the technology. U-480 would sink a minesweeper a little over a day later in the same area, followed by two merchant vessels on the same patrol. 59 crew were lost after the torpedo struck the warship on her port side immediately aft of the engine room, causing her to sink in less than a minute. (Acting) Lt. Frank. Williams was awarded the Royal Humane Society's bronze medal for his work in saving members of the crew in January 1945. 30 crew members were rescued by Royal Navy motor torpedo boats (MTB).

== Legacy ==
For the vessel's service during the war, Alberni received the battle honours "Atlantic 1941–44", "Normandy 1944" and "North Sea 1944". Divers had been searching for the wreck, with reports in the 1980s of its discovery, but these were discarded for being in too shallow water.

In 1999 a privately funded memorial program titled "The Alberni Project" was established to honour all the crew who served on Alberni from the time she was commissioned in 1941 until her sinking in 1944. With the help from relatives of HMCS Alberni crewmen, private and public contributions, and community volunteers, TAP became TAPS (The Alberni Project Society) to preserve the times of the Battle of the Atlantic through the stories of the Canadian forces and civilians involved in the battle. A traveling exhibit and memorial was developed in 2005 and continues to make appearances on Vancouver Island and the lower British Columbia mainland. On 1 September 2013 a permanent museum (The HMCS Alberni Museum – HAMM) was opened at the Comox Centre Mall in Comox, British Columbia. In November 2016 HAMM moved to the city of Courtenay, British Columbia to an expanded facility incorporating Canadian Forces serving in the Great War to the present day.
