= U82 =

U82 may refer to:

- German submarine U-82, various vessels
- HMS Magpie (U82), a Royal Navy sloop 1943–1959
- Small nucleolar RNA SNORD82
- U82, a planned line of the Düsseldorf Stadtbahn
