= Muskeget =

Muskeget may refer to:

- Muskeget Island, an island off the coast of Massachusetts in the United States
- USS Muskeget, a United States Navy patrol vessel commissioned in January 1942 which later served as the United States Coast Guard weather ship USCGC Muskeget until sunk in September 1942
