= HMCS Orillia =

Flower-class corvette of the Royal Canadian Navy

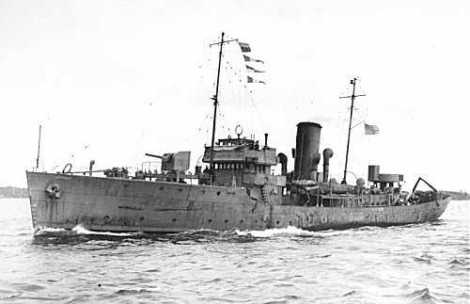
- HMCS Orillia

History

Canada
- Name: Orillia
- Namesake: Orillia, Ontario
- Ordered: 1 February 1940
- Builder: Collingwood Shipyards Ltd. Collingwood
- Laid down: 4 March 1940
- Launched: 15 September 1940
- Commissioned: 25 November 1940
- Out of service: paid off 2 July 1945
- Identification: Pennant number: K119
- Honours and awards: Atlantic 1941–45
- Fate: Scrapped January 1951

General characteristics
- Class & type: Flower-class corvette (original)
- Displacement: 925 long tons (940 t; 1,036 short tons)
- Length: 205 ft (62.48 m)o/a
- Beam: 33 ft (10.06 m)
- Draught: 11.5 ft (3.51 m)
- Propulsion: Single shaft; 2 × fire tube Scotch boilers; 1 × 4-cycle triple-expansion reciprocating steam engine; 2,750 ihp (2,050 kW)
- Speed: 16 knots (29.6 km/h)
- Range: 3,500 nautical miles (6,482 km) at 12 knots (22.2 km/h)
- Complement: 85
- Sensors & processing systems: 1 × SW1C or 2C radar; 1 × Type 123A or Type 127DV sonar
- Armament: 1 × BL 4 in (102 mm) Mk.IX single gun; 2 × .50 cal machine gun (twin); 2 × Lewis .303 cal machine gun (twin); 2 × Mk.II depth charge throwers; 2 × depth charge rails with 40 depth charges; Originally fitted with minesweeping gear, later removed

HMCS Orillia was a Flower-class corvette that served with the Royal Canadian Navy during the Second World War. She fought primarily in the Battle of the Atlantic. She was named for Orillia, Ontario.

== Background ==
Flower-class corvettes like Orillia serving with the Royal Canadian Navy during the Second World War were different from earlier and more traditional sail-driven corvettes. The "corvette" designation was created by the French as a class of small warships; the Royal Navy borrowed the term for a period but discontinued its use in 1877. During the hurried preparations for war in the late 1930s, Winston Churchill reactivated the corvette class, needing a name for smaller ships used in an escort capacity, in this case based on a whaling ship design. The generic name "flower" was used to designate the class of these ships, which – in the Royal Navy – were named after flowering plants.

Corvettes commissioned by the Royal Canadian Navy during the Second World War were named after communities for the most part, to better represent the people who took part in building them. This idea was put forth by Admiral Percy W. Nelles. Sponsors were commonly associated with the community for which the ship was named. Royal Navy corvettes were designed as open sea escorts, while Canadian corvettes were developed for coastal auxiliary roles which was exemplified by their minesweeping gear. Eventually the Canadian corvettes would be modified to allow them to perform better on the open seas.

== Construction and career ==
Ordered 1 February 1940 as part of the 1939–1940 Flower-class building program, Orillia was laid down by Collingwood Shipyards on 4 March 1940. Launched 1 September she was commissioned later that year on 25 November at Collingwood, Ontario. She was sent to Halifax to join the convoys.

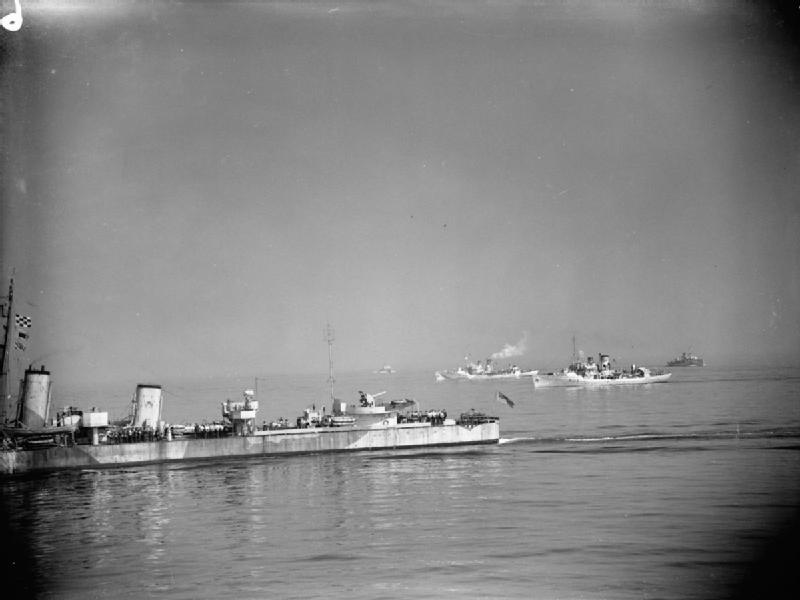
HMCS Orillia, in right background, with C4 Escort Group off the coast of Northern Ireland

Orillia was first assigned to Halifax Local Defence Force upon arrival. She served with them until 23 May 1941 when she was assigned as an original member of Newfoundland Escort Force operating out of St. John's, Newfoundland. During this time she was assigned to convoy SC 42, a slow convoy. Orillia was part of an escort group that included the destroyer HMCS Skeena, and corvettes HMCS Alberni and Kenogami. The convoy sailed directly into the path of a U-boat wolfpack of 14 u-boats. During the running battle the Orillia dropped back to pick up survivors and eventually stood by the damaged tanker Tahchee and towed her to Iceland. However the commander, Lieutenant Commander Ted Briggs, RNCR, failed to notify his senior officer that he was doing so for some time, depriving the convoy of one of her few escorts. Though a great humanitarian gesture this added to the mayhem within the convoy. Sixteen ships were sunk during the battle.

On 24 December 1941 she was sent for a refit at Halifax. Upon completion of the refit she joined Escort Group (EG) C-1 and was sent to work up at Tobermory for three weeks. Orillia spent until January 1944 escorting convoys on the Newfy-Derry run. She joined Escort Group C-2 in November 1942 and worked with them until her next refit in March 1944.

Orillia was sent to Liverpool for a lengthy refit, where they lengthened her fo'c'sle. After completing the refit she spent the rest of the war as part of EG W-2.

She was paid off on 2 July 1945 at Sorel. The ship was sold for scrapping in January 1951 and broken up in Hamilton, Ontario.
