= SS Empire Crossbill =

World War II merchant ship of the United Kingdom

History
- Name: West Amargosa (1919–41); Empire Crossbill (1941)
- Owner: United States Shipping Board (1919–37); United States Maritime Commission (1937–40); Ministry of War Transport (1940–41)
- Operator: United American Lines (1919–21); United States Shipping Board (1921–37); United States Maritime Commission (1937–40); Sir W. Reardon Smith & Sons (1940); John Morrison & Co Ltd (1940–41)
- Port of registry: (United States) Los Angeles, USA (1919–40); London, United Kingdom (1940–41)
- Builder: Los Angeles Shipbuilding & Drydock Company
- Yard number: 11
- Launched: 25 September 1918
- Completed: March 1919
- Out of service: 11 September 1941
- Identification: United States Official Number 217631 (1919–40); United Kingdom Official Number 168177 (1940–41); Code Letters LQBW (1919–34); Code Letters KLCP (1934–40); Code Letter MNLP (1940–41)
- Fate: Torpedoed and sunk

General characteristics
- Type: Cargo ship
- Tonnage: 5,463 GRT; 3,411 NRT; 8,600 DWT
- Length: 410 ft 0 in (124.97 m) between perpendiculars
- Beam: 54 ft 4 in (16.56 m)
- Draught: 23 ft (7.0 m)
- Depth: 27 ft 2 in (8.28 m)
- Propulsion: Triple expansion steam engine, single screw propeller
- Speed: 11 knots (20 km/h)
- Complement: 38 + 10 DEMS gunners (Empire Crossbill)

Location of the sinking of Empire Crossbill off Greenland.

Empire Crossbill was a 5,463 GRT Design 1013 cargo ship that was completed in 1919 by Los Angeles Shipbuilding & Drydock Company, San Pedro, California, United States for the United States Shipping Board (USSB). She was transferred to the United States Maritime Commission (USMC) in 1937 and the Ministry of Transport (MoT) in 1941, serving until she was torpedoed and sunk on 11 September 1941 by U-82 in the Atlantic Ocean while a member of Convoy SC 42.

== Description ==
The ship was built in 1919 by Los Angeles Shipbuilding & Drydock Company, San Pedro, California. She was Yard Number 11.

The ship was 410 feet 0 inches (124.97 m) long between perpendiculars, with a beam of 54 feet 4 inches (16.56 m). She had a depth of 27 feet 2 inches (8.28 m), and a draught of 23 feet (7.0 m). She was assessed at 3,750 GRT, 3,411 NRT. Her DWT was 6,800.

The ship was propelled by a 359 nhp triple expansion steam engine, which had cylinders of 28 1/2 inches (72 cm), 47 inches (120 cm) and 78 inches (200 cm) diameter by 48 inches (120 cm) stroke. The engine was built by Los Angeles Shipbuilding & Drydock Corporation.

== History ==
West Amargosa was built for the USSB. She was completed in March 1919, The United States Official Number 217631 and Code Letters LQBW were allocated. West Amargosa was chartered by United American Lines until 1921, operating the Plymouth – Gibraltar – Tunis – New York route. With the change of Code Letters in 1934, she was allocated KLCP. In 1937, she was transferred to the USMC and laid up as part of the reserve fleet.

In 1940, West Amargosa was transferred to the MoWT. She was initially operated under the management of Sir W. Reardon Smith & Sons. Management was later transferred to John Morrison & Co Ltd, Newcastle-upon-Tyne. West Amargosa was due to join Convoy HX 119, which departed from Halifax, Nova Scotia, Canada on 6 April 1941 and arrived at Liverpool, Lancashire on 22 April. She was recorded as carrying a cargo of scrap iron bound for Middlesbrough, Yorkshire. Instead, she joined Convoy SC 28, which departed from Halifax on 9 April and arrived at Liverpool on 28 April. Her destination was now given as West Hartlepool, Co Durham. She left the convoy at the Clyde, joining Convoy WN 228, which departed the Clyde on 1 May and arrived at Methil, Fife on 5 May.

West Amargosa was renamed Empire Crossbill. She was allocated the United Kingdom Official Number 168177 and Code Letters MLNP. Her port of registry was London. She departed Middlesbrough on 30 May for the Tyne, returning to Middlesbrough on 2 June and departing the same day for the Tyne again. On 10 June, she joined Convoy EC 31, which had departed from Southend, Essex on 9 June and arrived at Loch Ewe on 14 June. She then joined Convoy OB 334, which departed from Liverpool on 11 June and arrived at Halifax on 25 June. She left the convoy at St John's, Newfoundland on 24 June. Empire Crossbill departed St. John's that day for Philadelphia, Pennsylvania, United States, arriving on 2 July.

Empire Crossbill departed Philadelphia on 22 August for Halifax, where she arrived on 25 August, departing the same day for Sydney, Cape Breton, Canada. Empire Crossbill was a member of Convoy SC 42, which departed Sydney on 30 August 1941 and arrived at Liverpool on 15 September. She was stated to be carrying 6,686 tons of steel and four tons of relief goods, although it is also stated that she was carrying a cargo of explosives. At 03:11 GMT on 11 September, Empire Crossbill was torpedoed and sunk by U-82 at 63°14′N 37°12′W. All 38 crew, ten DEMS gunners and her single passenger were killed. Those lost on Empire Crossbill are commemorated at the Tower Hill Memorial, London.
