= Convoy SC 42 =

Convoy during naval battles of the Second World War

Convoy
- Part of World War II
Date	9–12 September 1941
Location	North Atlantic
Result	German victory

Belligerents
Kriegsmarine	Royal Navy; Royal Canadian Navy

Commanders and leaders
Admiral Karl Dönitz	Comm: R Adm. WB Mackenzie; SOE: Lt.Cmdr. JC Hibbard

Strength
Markgraf group 14 U-boats	65 merchant ships 4 escorts

Casualties and losses
2 U-boats sunk 53 killed	16 merchant ships sunk (68,259 tons); 4 ships damaged (14,132 tons); 276 killed

Convoy SC 42 was the 42nd of the numbered series of World War II slow convoys of merchant ships from Sydney, Cape Breton Island to Liverpool. SC 42 was attacked over a three night period in September 1941, losing 16 ships sunk and 4 damaged. This was the worst Allied loss following the attack on convoy SC 7 the previous year. Two attacking U-boats were destroyed.

== Background ==
Sixty-five ships departed Sydney (Nova Scotia) on 30 August 1941 under local escort, bound for Liverpool. The convoy commodore was Rear Admiral WB Mackenzie in Everleigh. A week later, they were met just east of the Strait of Belle Isle by the Canadian 24th Escort Group consisting of the River-class destroyer Skeena (Lt Cdr JC Hibbard, senior officer) with Flower-class corvettes Alberni, Kenogami, and Orillia. Corvettes Chambly and Moose Jaw were conducting training exercises in the convoy path at the direction of Commander James D. Prentice, RCN, and were prepared to reinforce the escort as the convoy entered an area where U-boats were known to be waiting.

Ranged against them was the Markgraf wolf pack, a group of 14 U-boats in a patrol line southeast of Greenland.

== Action ==
Early on 9 September U-85 sighted the convoy near Cape Farewell, Greenland, and made an unsuccessful torpedo attack. She then commenced shadowing, while other Markgraf boats moved in. The moon rose on the southern side on the convoy that night, and U-432 torpedoed the silhouetted 5,229 GRT British freighter Muneric. Muneric and her cargo of 7000 tons of iron ore sank rapidly with all 63 of her crew. Kenogami commenced firing on a surfaced U-boat without benefit of star shell or flashless powder, and quickly lost contact as the crew lost their night-vision in the flash of gunfire.

The convoy made two emergency turns over the next half-hour as ships in the convoy reported sighting three more surfaced U-boats. Another emergency convoy turn ninety minutes later caught Skeena pursuing a contact at speed. While maneuvering to avoid collision, Skeena passed a surfaced U-boat on a reciprocal course, being fired upon by ships in the convoy so closely that Skeena's guns could not be depressed to bear. U-652 torpedoed Baron Pentland and Tahchee during the excitement. The tanker Tahchee was towed back to port by Orillia but the 3,410 GRT British freighter Baron Pentland sank with 1,512 standards of lumber and two of her crew.

Another emergency turn by the convoy brought two hours of suspenseful quiet while Orillia aided Tahchee and searched for survivors astern of the convoy. Then U-432 torpedoed the 3,205 GRT Dutch freighter Winterswijk and the 1,113 GRT Norwegian freighter Stargard. The freighter Regin stopped to rescue Starguard's survivors and opened fire on a surfaced U-boat. While Skeena and Kenogami searched for U-boats around stricken Winterswijk and Stargard, U-81 torpedoed the 3,252 GRT British freighter Sally Maersk, and the convoy made another emergency turn to avoid a surfaced U-boat. U-82 torpedoed the 7,465 GRT British CAM ship Empire Hudson less than two hours after Skeena regained station ahead of the convoy.

Daylight on 10 September brought several periscope sightings and emergency turns by the convoy before U-85 torpedoed the 4,748 GRT British freighter Thistleglen. Skeena and Alberni counterattacked and damaged U-85 with depth charges. Thistleglen sank with 5,200 tons of steel, 2,400 tons of pig iron, and 3 of her crew.

U-82 torpedoed the 7,519 GRT British tanker Bulysses that evening. U-82 then torpedoed the 3,915 GRT British freighter Gypsum Queen shortly after the convoy ordered an emergency turn. Gypsum Queen sank quickly with 5,500 tons of sulfur and ten of her crew. Bulysses sank with 9,300 tons of gas oil and 4 of her crew. Other ships in convoy rescued the survivors. The corvettes Chambly and Moose Jaw observed the fireworks of these attacks and surprised U-501 while steaming to reinforce the escort. U-501 was first depth-charged by Chambly then rammed by Moose Jaw as the damaged submarine surfaced. The captain of U-501 jumped from the conning tower to Moose Jaw's deck; and Moose Jaw sent a boarding party to enter the submarine. Eleven Germans and one of the Canadian boarding party (Stoker William Brown) were lost when U-501 sank. U-501 was the first U-boat sunk by Canadian escorts.

Just after midnight on 10/11 September U-207 torpedoed the 4924-GRT British freighter Berury and the 4,815 GRT British freighter Stonepool, while Chambly and Moose Jaw were attacking U-501. Then U-432 torpedoed the 1,231 GRT Swedish freighter Garm and U-82 torpedoed the 5,463 GRT British freighter Empire Crossbill and the 1,980 GRT Swedish freighter Scania two hours later while Alberni, Kenogami and Moose Jaw were rescuing survivors of Berury and Stonepool. U-43 launched torpedoes unsuccessfully, U-433 damaged the Norwegian 2,200 GRT freighter Bestum, U-202 sank the crippled Scania, while U-105 sank the Panamanian-flagged straggler Montana.

HMS Leamington

On 11 September, the escort was reinforced by the naval trawler Buttermere and Flower-class corvettes HMCS Wetaskiwin, HMCS Mimosa, and HMS Gladiolus from convoy HX 147 and by the 2nd Escort Group consisting of the Admiralty type flotilla leader HMS Douglas (Commander WE Banks senior officer), the Town-class destroyer HMS Leamington, the V and W-class destroyer HMS Veteran and R-class destroyer HMS Skate and S-class destroyer HMS Saladin. Leamington and Veteran dropped 21 depth charges on the afternoon of 11 September while investigating an RAF Coastal Command aircraft report of a U-boat ahead of the convoy. Postwar analysis indicated their attacks probably destroyed U-207.

== Aftermath ==
With the arrival of these reinforcements further attacks by Markgraf were stifled. Though the group continued to shadow, it was unable to mount any further assaults.

The arrival on 12 September of the naval trawler Windermere and Town-class destroyers St. Croix from convoy SC 41 and Columbia from convoy HX 147 allowed the remaining original escorts Skeena, Alberni, and Kenogami to leave for refuelling . On 13 September destroyers of the 2nd Escort Group departed for refuelling following the arrival of American destroyers Sims, Hughes and Russell. The last incident of the voyage took place three days later when U-98 torpedoed the 4392-ton British freighter Jedmore as the convoy approached North Channel on the late afternoon of 16 September.

Convoy SC 42 arrived in Liverpool on 20 September 1941. Sixteen ships totalling 68,259 GRT had been sunk and four ships (14,132 GRT) damaged. One ship had turned back. Forty four ships arrived safely and unharmed, and two U-boats had been destroyed, though one of these sinkings was not confirmed until after the war.

== Table of losses ==
=== Allied ships sunk ===
Date	Time	Name	Flag	Casualties	Tonnage (GRT)	Cargo	Sunk by...
9 Sept 1941	06:55	Empire Springbuck	United Kingdom	42	5,591	Steel and explosives	U-81
9 Sept 1941	21:37	Muneric	United Kingdom	63	5,229	Iron Ore	U-432
9 Sept 1941	23:48	Baron Pentland	United Kingdom	2	3,410	Lumber	U-652 & U-372
10 Sept 1941	02:10	Winterswijk	Netherlands	20	3,205	Phosphates	U-432
10 Sept 1941	02:10	Stargard	Norway	2	1,113	Lumber	U-432
10 Sept 1941	02:45	Sally Maersk	United Kingdom	0	3,252	Wheat	U-81
10 Sept 1941	05:04	Empire Hudson	United Kingdom	4	7,456	Wheat	U-82
10 Sept 1941	10:30	Thistleglen	United Kingdom	3	4,748	Steel & Pig Iron	U-85
10 Sept 1941	20:57	Bulysses	United Kingdom	4	7,519	Gas Oil	U-82
10 Sept 1941	21:00	Gypsum Queen	United Kingdom	10	3,915	Sulphur	U-82
11 Sept 1941	00:10	Stonepool	United Kingdom	42	4,815	Grain, oats & trucks	U-207
11 Sept 1941	00:10	Berury	United Kingdom	1	4,924	General	U-207
11 Sept 1941	02:10	Scania	Sweden	0	1,980	Lumber	U-82 & U-202
11 Sept 1941	02:10	Empire Crossbill	United Kingdom	49	5,463	Steel	U-82
11 Sept 1941	02:30	Garm	Sweden	6	1,231	Lumber	U-432
16 Sept 1941	19:00	Jedmore	United Kingdom	31	4,392	Iron Ore	U-98

=== U-boats destroyed ===
Date	Number	Type	Captain	Casualties	Fate	hit by...
10 September 1941	U-501	IX	K/L Hugo Förster	12	Destroyed	HMCS Chambly (K116) and HMCS Moose Jaw (K164)
11 September 1941	U-207	VIIC	K/L Fritz Meyer	41	Destroyed	HMS Leamington (G19) and HMS Veteran (D72)

== See also ==
- Convoy Battles of World War II
