= German submarine U-82 =

U-82 may refer to one of the following German submarines:

- SM U-82, a Type U 81 submarine launched in 1916 and that served in the First World War until surrendered on 16 January 1919; broken up at Blyth in 1922
  - During the First World War, Germany also had this submarine with a similar name:
    - SM UB-82, a Type UB III submarine launched in 1917 and sunk on 17 April 1918
- German submarine U-82 (1941), a Type VIIC submarine that served in the Second World War until sunk on 6 February 1942
