= Small nucleolar RNA SNORD82 =

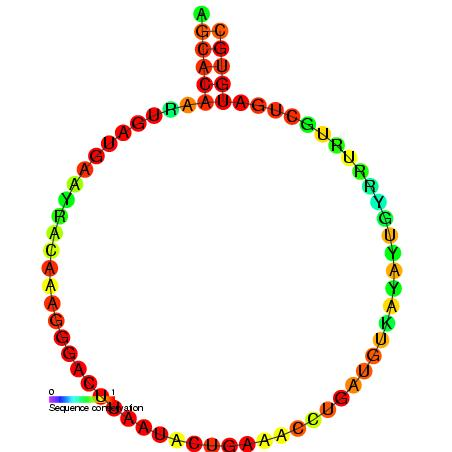
- Predicted secondary structure and sequence conservation of SNORD82

Identifiers
- Symbol: SNORD82
- Alt. Symbols: U82
- Rfam: RF00158

Other data
- RNA type: Gene; snRNA; snoRNA; C/D-box
- Domain: Eukaryota
- GO: GO:0006396 GO:0005730
- SO: SO:0000593
- PDB structures: PDBe

In molecular biology, snoRNA U82 (also known as SNORD82 or Z25) is a non-coding RNA (ncRNA) molecule which functions in the modification of other small nuclear RNAs (snRNAs). This type of modifying RNA is usually located in the nucleolus of the eukaryotic cell which is a major site of snRNA biogenesis. It is known as a small nucleolar RNA (snoRNA) and also often referred to as a guide RNA.

snoRNA U82/Z25 belongs to the C/D box class of snoRNAs which contain the conserved sequence motifs known as the C box (UGAUGA) and the D box (CUGA). Most of the members of the box C/D family function in directing site-specific 2'-O-methylation of substrate RNAs.

snoRNA U82 has been identified in both humans and mice: it is located in the fifth intron of the nucleolin gene in both species. Two additional snoRNAs (C/D box snoRNA U20 and the H/ACA snoRNA U23 ) are also encoded within the introns of the nucleolin gene.

U82 is predicted to guide the 2'O-ribose methylation of 18S ribosomal RNA (rRNA) residue A1678.

Another, different snoRNA, named U82 has been predicted in the introns of L3 ribosomal protein gene (RPL3) in humans and cows. However, the expression of this snoRNA could not be confirmed by northern blotting or Reverse transcription polymerase chain reaction (RT-PCR) and it should not be confused with this snoRNA located in the nucleolin gene.
