= HMCS Chambly =

Flower-class corvette

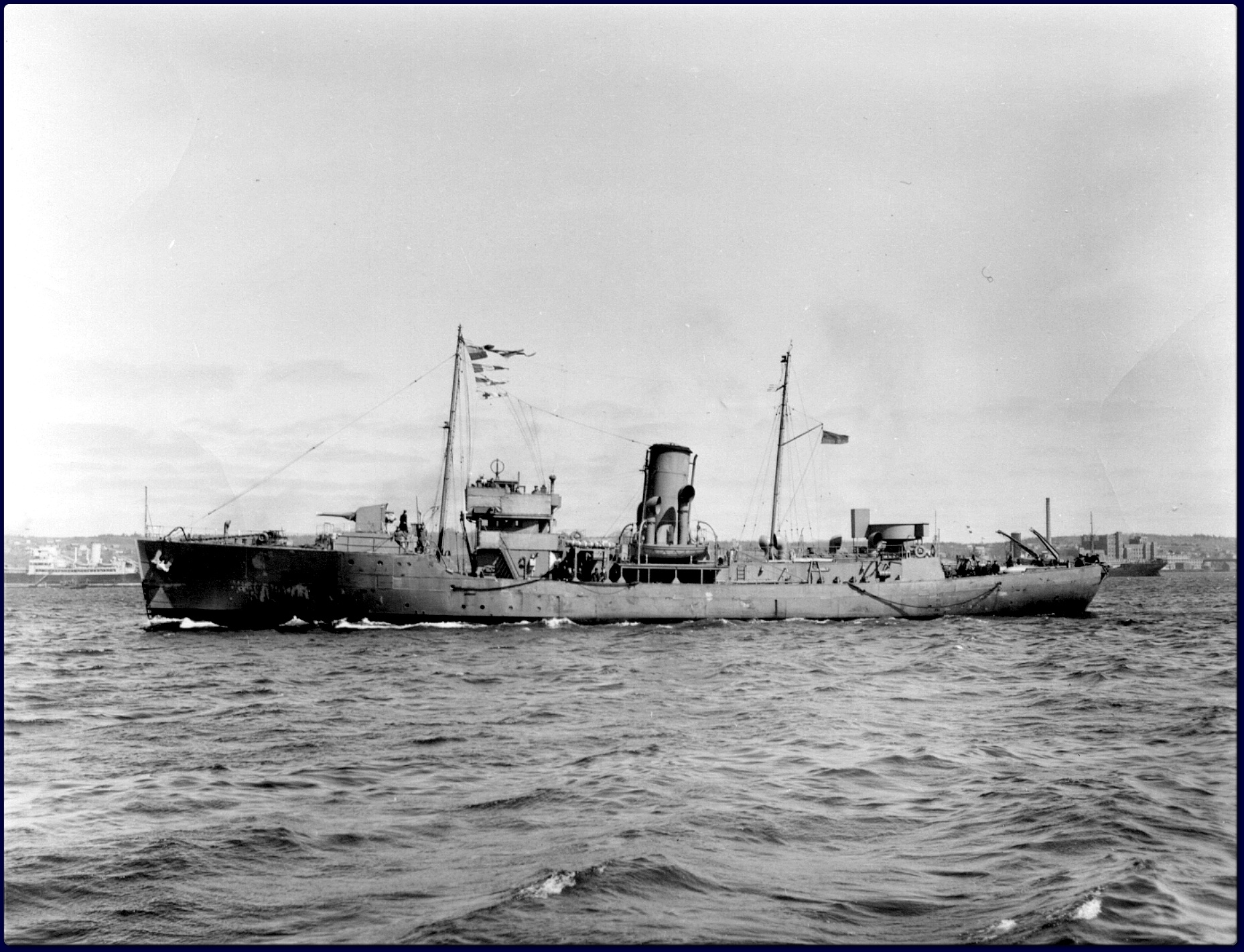
- HMCS Chambly in as-built condition, c. 1941. Note that the ship is still fitted with minesweeping gear, and that no armament has yet been installed in the "bandstand" aft of the engine room.

History

Canada
- Name: Chambly
- Namesake: Chambly, Quebec
- Ordered: 20 January 1940
- Builder: Canadian Vickers Ltd., Montreal
- Laid down: 20 February 1940
- Launched: 29 July 1940
- Commissioned: 18 December 1940
- Decommissioned: 20 June 1945
- Identification: pennant number: K116
- Honours and awards: Atlantic 1941-45
- Fate: Sold for civilian use as Sonia Vinke in 1952 and scrapped in 1966.

General characteristics
- Class & type: Flower-class corvette (original)
- Displacement: 925 long tons (940 t; 1,036 short tons)
- Length: 205 ft (62.48 m)o/a
- Beam: 33 ft (10.06 m)
- Draught: 11.5 ft (3.51 m)
- Propulsion: single shaft; 2 × fire tube Scotch boilers; 1 × 4-cycle triple-expansion reciprocating steam engine; 2,750 ihp (2,050 kW)
- Speed: 16 knots (29.6 km/h)
- Range: 3,500 nautical miles (6,482 km) at 12 knots (22.2 km/h)
- Complement: 85
- Sensors & processing systems: 1 × SW1C or 2C radar; 1 × Type 123A or Type 127DV sonar
- Armament: 1 × BL 4 in (102 mm) Mk.IX single gun; 2 × .50 cal machine gun (twin); 2 × Lewis .303 cal machine gun (twin); 2 × Mk.II depth charge throwers; 2 × depth charge rails with 40 depth charges; originally fitted with minesweeping gear, later removed

HMCS Chambly was a Flower-class corvette serving in the Royal Canadian Navy. She was ordered from Canadian Vickers Ltd. in Montreal, laid down on 20 February 1940, launched on 29 July, and commissioned on 18 December 1940, named after the city of Chambly, Quebec. Chambly escorted trade convoys between Halifax Harbour and the Western Approaches through the battle of the Atlantic and, together with HMCS Moose Jaw, achieved the RCN's first U-boat kill of the war.

== Background ==
Flower-class corvettes like Chambly serving with the Royal Canadian Navy during the Second World War were different from earlier and more traditional sail-driven corvettes. The "corvette" designation was created by the French as a class of small warships; the Royal Navy borrowed the term for a period but discontinued its use in 1877. During the hurried preparations for war in the late 1930s, Winston Churchill reactivated the corvette class, needing a name for smaller ships used in an escort capacity, in this case based on a whaling ship design. The generic name "flower" was used to designate the class of these ships, which – in the Royal Navy – were named after flowering plants.

Corvettes commissioned by the Royal Canadian Navy during the Second World War were named after communities for the most part, to better represent the people who took part in building them. This idea was put forth by Admiral Percy W. Nelles. Sponsors were commonly associated with the community for which the ship was named. Royal Navy corvettes were designed as open sea escorts, while Canadian corvettes were developed for coastal auxiliary roles which was exemplified by their minesweeping gear. Eventually the Canadian corvettes would be modified to allow them to perform better on the open seas.

== War service ==
Chambly was one of the first three Royal Canadian Navy corvettes available for Atlantic service when the St. Lawrence River froze in late 1940. Her commanding officer, Commander James D. Prentice, RCN, was designated Senior Officer, Canadian corvettes, and was responsible for organizing operational training of the remaining corvettes as they were completed and commissioned through 1942. Commander Prentice's training exercises often took the form of a support group able to reinforce the escort of convoys coming under attack.

In May 1941 she took part in the Canadian Navy's secret trials of diffused lighting camouflage, a technology for concealing ships from submarines at night. On 12 May, she was fitted with an experimental anti-submarine radar, CSC, and used for experiments over the next week. On 13 May she gave an excellent demonstration of the usefulness of the system when fog made visibility 0.1 miles (0.16 km). She was able to give steering instructions that found the submarine dead ahead when the traditional plotters were convinced it was 28 degrees to one side. This resulted in widespread availability of production SW-1C sets to escorts in 1942.

On 23 June 1941, Chambly participated in defense of convoy HX 133, during the first battle of the Newfoundland Escort Force. A similar training exercise in September produced the first Canadian U-boat sinking when U-501 was destroyed during the battle for convoy SC 42.

Commander Prentice in Chambly became the senior officer of Mid-Ocean Escort Force (MOEF) group C1 in August 1942 and remained in that position until assigned to Admiral Leonard W. Murray's staff when Chambly commenced yard overhaul in November. Following overhaul, Chambly participated in the battles for convoy KMS 11G and convoy MKS 10 with MOEF group C2 before assignment to Support Group 9. With Support Group 9, she narrowly avoided destruction when an acoustic torpedo exploded in the propeller wash of her wake during the battle for convoys ONS 18/ON 202. After another yard overhaul in early 1944, Chambly escorted 16 trans-Atlantic convoys without loss before the end of the war.

=== Trans-Atlantic convoys escorted ===
Convoy	Escort Group	Dates	Notes
SC 99	MOEF group C1	9–19 September 1942	59 ships escorted without loss from Newfoundland to Northern Ireland
ON 133	MOEF group C1	26 September-5 October 1942	35 ships escorted without loss from Northern Ireland to Newfoundland
HX 211	MOEF group C1	13–20 October 1942	29 ships escorted without loss from Newfoundland to Northern Ireland
ON 143	MOEF group C1	2–11 November 1942	26 ships escorted without loss from Northern Ireland to Newfoundland
KMS 11G	MOEF group C2	14–24 March 1943	Firth of Clyde to Mediterranean Sea; 1 ship sunk by aircraft
MKS 10	MOEF group C2	27 March-5 April 1943	Mediterranean to Liverpool; 1 ship torpedoed & sunk
HX 237	MOEF group C2	7–16 May 1943	46 ships escorted without loss from Newfoundland to Northern Ireland
ON 186		25 May-2 June 1943	44 ships escorted without loss from Northern Ireland to Newfoundland
HX 243		12–20 June 1943	76 ships escorted without loss from Newfoundland to Northern Ireland
ON 191		2–7 July 1943	60 ships escorted without loss from Northern Ireland to Newfoundland
HX 248		21–28 July 1943	89 ships escorted without loss from Newfoundland to Northern Ireland
ON 196		9–16 August 1943	78 ships escorted without loss from Northern Ireland to Newfoundland
Convoys ONS 18/ON 202	Support Group 9	19–25 September 1943	Northern Ireland to Newfoundland; 10 ships torpedoed (9 sank)
SC 143		2–11 October 1943	Newfoundland to Northern Ireland: 1 ship torpedoed & sunk
ONS 21		23 October-2 November 1943	33 ships escorted without loss from Northern Ireland to Newfoundland
HX 291		15–27 May 1944	99 ships escorted without loss from Newfoundland to Northern Ireland
ON 239		4–15 June 1944	97 ships escorted without loss from Northern Ireland to Newfoundland
HX 296		24 June-2 July 1944	91 ships escorted without loss from Newfoundland to Northern Ireland
ON 244		11–18 July 1944	56 ships escorted without loss from Northern Ireland to Newfoundland
HX 301		30 July-8 August 1944	130 ships escorted without loss from Newfoundland to Northern Ireland
ON 249		19–28 August 1944	153 ships escorted without loss from Northern Ireland to Newfoundland
HX 306		6–17 September 1944	120 ships escorted without loss from Newfoundland to Northern Ireland
ONS 33		30 September-10 October 1944	51 ships escorted without loss from Northern Ireland to Newfoundland
HX 314		20–29 October 1944	63 ships escorted without loss from Newfoundland to Northern Ireland
ON 265		10–19 November 1944	55 ships escorted without loss from Northern Ireland to Newfoundland
HX 322		29 November-7 December 1944	38 ships escorted without loss from Newfoundland to Northern Ireland
ON 273		19–30 December 1944	64 ships escorted without loss from Northern Ireland to Newfoundland
HX 330		7–17 January 1945	45 ships escorted without loss from Newfoundland to Northern Ireland
ONS 41		30 January-15 February 1945	34 ships escorted without loss from Northern Ireland to Newfoundland
HX 339		23 February-3 March 1945	79 ships escorted without loss from Newfoundland to Northern Ireland
ONS 44		12–27 March 1945	21 ships escorted without loss from Northern Ireland to Newfoundland

== Post war service ==
Chambly was decommissioned at the end of hostilities on 20 June 1945. After being refitted in Louisbourg, Nova Scotia, she was sold in 1946; the buyer planned to convert her into a whaling ship. The next available record from the Government of Canada states that she entered service as a Dutch civilian in 1954 as the Sonia Vinke.

The ship was broken up by Recuperaciones Submarinas S.A beginning on 10 October 1966 in Santander, Spain.
