= German submarine U-755 =

German World War II submarine

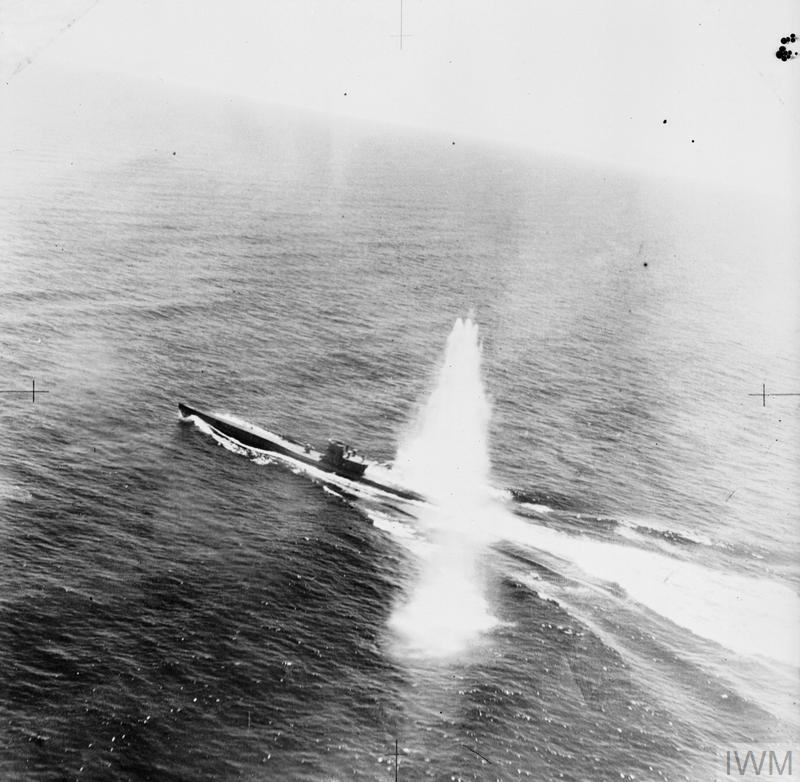

History

Nazi Germany
- Name: U-755
- Ordered: 9 October 1939
- Builder: Kriegsmarinewerft Wilhelmshaven
- Yard number: 138
- Laid down: 11 January 1940
- Launched: 23 August 1941
- Commissioned: 3 November 1941
- Fate: Sunk on 28 May 1943 by British Hudson Aircraft

General characteristics
- Class & type: German Type VIIC submarine
- Displacement: 769 tonnes (757 long tons) surfaced; 871 t (857 long tons) submerged
- Length: 67.10 m (220.1 ft) o/a; 50.50 m (165.7 ft) pressure hull
- Beam: 6.20 m (20.3 ft) o/a; 4.70 m (15.4 ft) pressure hull
- Draught: 4.74 m (15.6 ft)
- Propulsion: 3,200 PS (2,400 kW; 3,200 bhp) surfaced; 750 PS (550 kW; 740 shp) submerged
- Speed: 17.7 knots (32.8 km/h; 20.4 mph) surfaced; 7.6 knots (14.1 km/h; 8.7 mph) submerged
- Range: 8,500 nmi (15,700 km; 9,800 mi) at 10 knots (19 km/h; 12 mph) surfaced; 80 nmi (150 km; 92 mi) at 4 knots (7.4 km/h; 4.6 mph) submerged
- Test depth: Calculated crush depth: 220 m (720 ft)
- Complement: 4 officers, 40 – 56 enlisted
- Armament: 5 × 53.3 cm (21 in) torpedo tubes (four bow, one stern); 14 × torpedoes; 1 × 8.8 cm (3.46 in) deck gun (220 rounds); 1 x 2 cm (0.79 in) C/30 AA gun

Service record
- Part of: 5th U-boat Flotilla; 3 November 1941 – 31 July 1942; 9th U-boat Flotilla; 1 August – 30 November 1942; 29th U-boat Flotilla; 1 December 1942 – 28 May 1943
- Identification codes: M 26 199
- Commanders: Oblt.z.S. / Kptlt. Walter Göing; 3 November 1941 – 28 May 1943
- Operations: 5 patrols: 1st patrol: 4 August – 6 October 1942; 2nd patrol: 1 – 22 November 1942; 3rd patrol: 27 January – 20 February 1943; 4th patrol: 21 March – 12 April 1943; 5th patrol: 18 – 28 May 1943
- Victories: 1 merchant ship sunk (928 GRT); 2 auxiliary warships sunk (2,974 GRT)

German submarine U-755 was a German Type VIIC submarine U-boat built for Nazi Germany's Kriegsmarine for service during World War II. Under the command of Kapitänleutnant Walter Göing. U-755 served with 9th U-boat Flotilla in the Atlantic, and later with 29th U-boat Flotilla operated in the Mediterranean Sea.

== Design ==
German Type VIIC submarines were preceded by the shorter Type VIIB submarines. U-755 had a displacement of 769 tonnes (757 long tons) when at the surface and 871 tonnes (857 long tons) while submerged. She had a total length of 67.10 m (220 ft 2 in), a pressure hull length of 50.50 m (165 ft 8 in), a beam of 6.20 m (20 ft 4 in), a height of 9.60 m (31 ft 6 in), and a draught of 4.74 m (15 ft 7 in). The submarine was powered by two Germaniawerft F46 four-stroke, six-cylinder supercharged diesel engines producing a total of 2,800 to 3,200 metric horsepower (2,060 to 2,350 kW; 2,760 to 3,160 shp) for use while surfaced, two Garbe, Lahmeyer & Co. RP 137/c double-acting electric motors producing a total of 750 metric horsepower (550 kW; 740 shp) for use while submerged. She had two shafts and two 1.23 m (4 ft) propellers. The boat was capable of operating at depths of up to 230 metres (750 ft).

The submarine had a maximum surface speed of 17.7 knots (32.8 km/h; 20.4 mph) and a maximum submerged speed of 7.6 knots (14.1 km/h; 8.7 mph). When submerged, the boat could operate for 80 nautical miles (150 km; 92 mi) at 4 knots (7.4 km/h; 4.6 mph); when surfaced, she could travel 8,500 nautical miles (15,700 km; 9,800 mi) at 10 knots (19 km/h; 12 mph). U-755 was fitted with five 53.3 cm (21 in) torpedo tubes (four fitted at the bow and one at the stern), fourteen torpedoes, one 8.8 cm (3.46 in) SK C/35 naval gun, 220 rounds, and a 2 cm (0.79 in) C/30 anti-aircraft gun. The boat had a complement of between forty-four and sixty.

== Service history ==
Work on U-755 began on 11 January 1940 at the Kriegsmarinewerft in Wilhelmshaven. She was commissioned on 3 November 1941, under the command of Kapitänleutnant Walter Göin and trained with 5th U-Boat Flotilla until 31 July 1942.

=== First and second patrols ===
Serving with 9th U-boat Flotilla, she served in two patrols. On 9 September 1942 – thirty-four days into her first patrol- U-755 sank her first ship. At 15:16 on 9 September 1942, she fired a spread of three torpedoes at the USS Muskeget, two hits were reported. Of the 121 on board, all were killed. U-755 docked at Brest on 6 October, after sixty-four days at sea.

On 1 November, U-755 began travelling from Brest to La Spezia in Italy, after a further twenty-two days at sea.

=== Third patrol ===
On 1 December 1942, U-755 was transferred from 9th U-boat Flotilla, to 29th U-boat Flotilla. She began her twenty-five-day-long third voyage on 27 January 1943. She returned to La Spezia from Algeria on 20 February.

=== Fourth patrol ===
U-755 set out on her fourth patrol on 21 March 1943, where she was to head to Morocco, and then to Toulon, in Vichy France. At 02:07 on 26 March 1943, U-755 fired three torpedoes at a convoy north of Ceuta and confirmed a hit in the bow of FFL Sergent Gouarne (P-43), which broke in two and sank in approximately ninety seconds, killing five of its nineteen-man complement. The U-boat attacked the same convoy with another spread of three torpedoes at 04.13 hours and reported a hit after 12 minutes, but this was probably an end-of-run detonation.

On 2 April 1943, the French trawler Simon Duhamel II was spotted off Cape d´Alboran, some time after 06:00, after straggling from convoy TE-20 due to a problem with her engines. U-755 fired at the trawler at 06:24, with one confirmed hit to the midship. This hit caused an explosion that broke the vessel apart, sinking in a mere four minutes. Only one man of her fifty-three-man crew survived, being rescued two days later.

=== Fifth patrol ===
On 18 May, U-755 set sail from Toulon on her fifth, and last patrol. Two days in, she was attacked by the British submarine HMS Sickle, but the fired torpedoes missed.

Eight days in, at 06:26, U-755 was attacked by a British Lockheed Hudson aircraft of No. 500 Squadron RAF, flown by pilot S/L H.G. Holmes, DFC, 13 nautical miles (24 km) north of Alboran Island. The aircraft was hit in the port engine by AA fire during the first attack run, but dropped three depth charges. The Hudson then made two dive-bombing attacks and dropped first two and then one A/S bomb, one of them exploding just 5 yards (4.6 m) off the port beam. The damaged engine then forced the pilot to return to base. Strafing had killed one crewman and wounded two others on U-755, which was forced to return to port due to heavy damage.

=== Fate ===
She was eventually sunk on 28 May 1943, north-west of Mallorca, in position 39°58′N 01°41′E, by rockets from a RAF Hudson aircraft of 608 Squadron. Of her complement of forty, only nine crewmen survived to be rescued by the Spanish destroyer Velasco, (Note: The survivors were picked up by the Spanish destroyer Churruca according to Blair.) her commander was not one of them.

=== Wolfpacks ===
U-755 took part in five wolfpacks, namely:

- Lohs (11 August – 22 September 1942)
- Blitz (22 – 26 September 1942)
- Tiger (26 – 30 September 1942)
- Luchs (1 – 2 October 1942)
- Delphin (4 – 14 November 1942)

== Summary of raiding history ==
Date	Ship Name	Nationality	Tonnage (GRT)	Fate
9 September 1942	USS Muskeget	United States Coast Guard	1,827	Sunk
26 March 1943	FFL Sergent Gouarne	Free French Naval Forces	1,147	Sunk
2 April 1943	Simon Duhamel II	Free France	928	Sunk

== Bibliography ==
- Blair, Clay (2000). Hitler's U-Boat War: The Hunted, 1942–1945. New York: Modern Library. ISBN 0-679-64033-9.
- Busch, Rainer; Röll, Hans-Joachim (1999). German U-boat commanders of World War II: a biographical dictionary. Translated by Brooks, Geoffrey. London, Annapolis, Md: Greenhill Books, Naval Institute Press. ISBN 1-55750-186-6.
- Busch, Rainer; Röll, Hans-Joachim (1999). Der U-Boot-Krieg, 1939-1945: Deutsche U-Boot-Verluste von September 1939 bis Mai 1945 [German U-boat losses from September 1939 to May 1945] (in German). Vol. IV. Hamburg, Berlin, Bonn: Mittler. ISBN 3-8132-0514-2.
- Gröner, Eric; Jung, Dieter; Maass, Martin (1991). German Warships 1815-1945: U-boats and Mine Warfare Vessels. Vol. 2. Translated by Thomas, Keith; Magowan, Rachel. London: Conway Maritime Press. ISBN 0-85177-593-4.
- Shores, Christopher; Massimello, Giovanni; Guest, Russell; Olynyk, Frank; Bock, Winfried; Thomas, Andy (2018). A History of the Mediterranean Air War 1940–1945: Volume Four: Sicily and Italy to the Fall of Rome: 14 May, 1943 – 5 June, 1944. London: Grub Street. ISBN 978-1-911621-10-2.
