= HMCS Moose Jaw =

Flower-class corvette

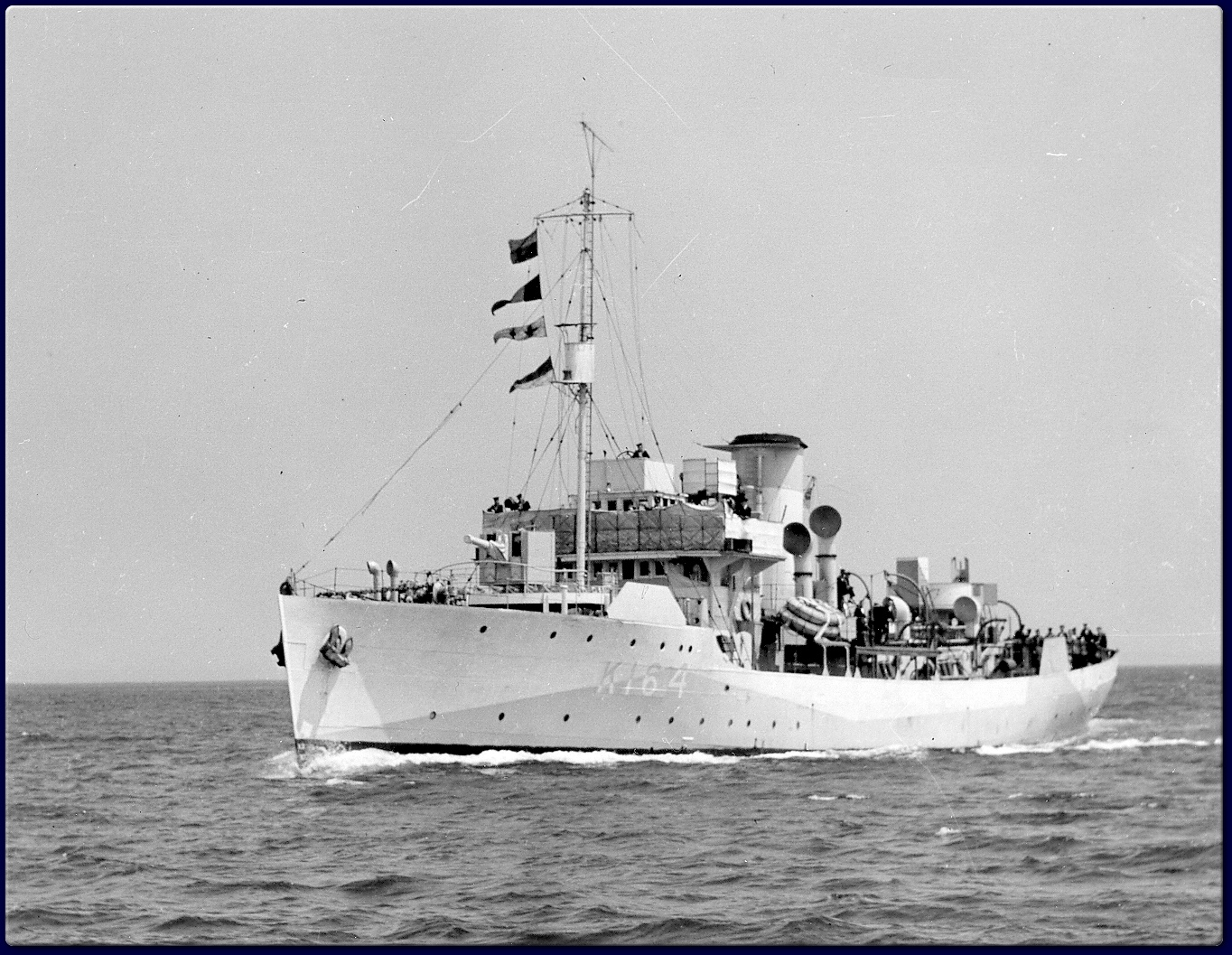
- HMCS Moose Jaw, circa 1941

History

Canada
- Name: Moose Jaw
- Namesake: Moose Jaw, Saskatchewan
- Ordered: 1 February 1940
- Builder: Collingwood Shipyards Ltd., Collingwood
- Laid down: 12 August 1940
- Launched: 9 April 1941
- Commissioned: 19 June 1941
- Decommissioned: 8 July 1945
- Identification: Pennant number: K164
- Honours and awards: Atlantic 1941-43; English Channel 1944-45; Normandy 1944
- Fate: Scrapped in September 1949 in Canada.

General characteristics
- Class & type: Flower-class corvette
- Displacement: 925 long tons (940 t; 1,036 short tons)
- Length: 205 ft (62.48 m) o/a
- Beam: 33 ft (10.06 m)
- Draught: 11.5 ft (3.51 m)
- Propulsion: single shaft; 2 × fire tube Scotch boilers; 1 × 4-cycle triple-expansion reciprocating steam engine; 2,750 ihp (2,050 kW)
- Speed: 16 knots (29.6 km/h)
- Range: 3,500 nautical miles (6,482 km) at 12 knots (22.2 km/h)
- Complement: 85
- Sensors & processing systems: 1 × SW1C or 2C radar; 1 × Type 123A or Type 127DV sonar
- Armament: 1 × BL 4 in (100 mm) Mk.IX gun; 2 × .50 cal. machine gun (twin); 2 × Lewis .303 cal machine gun (twin); 2 × Mk.II depth charge throwers; 2 × depth charge rails with 40 depth charges

HMCS Moose Jaw was a Royal Canadian Navy Flower-class corvette which took part in convoy escort duties during World War II. Together with HMCS Chambly, she achieved the RCN's first U-boat kill of the war. She was named after Moose Jaw, Saskatchewan.

== Background ==
Flower-class corvettes like Moose Jaw serving with the Royal Canadian Navy during the Second World War were different from earlier and more traditional sail-driven corvettes. The "corvette" designation was created by the French as a class of small warships; the Royal Navy borrowed the term for a period but discontinued its use in 1877. During the hurried preparations for war in the late 1930s, Winston Churchill reactivated the corvette class, needing a name for smaller ships used in an escort capacity, in this case based on a whaling ship design. The generic name "flower" was used to designate the class of these ships, which – in the Royal Navy – were named after flowering plants.

Corvettes commissioned by the Royal Canadian Navy during the Second World War were named after communities for the most part, to better represent the people who took part in building them. This idea was put forth by Admiral Percy W. Nelles. Sponsors were commonly associated with the community for which the ship was named. Royal Navy corvettes were designed as open sea escorts, while Canadian corvettes were developed for coastal auxiliary roles which was exemplified by their minesweeping gear. Eventually the Canadian corvettes would be modified to allow them to perform better on the open seas.

== Construction ==
Moose Jaw was originally named Churchill, for Churchill, Manitoba, but after a naming conflict with a Royal Navy vessel, her name was changed. She was ordered on 1 February 1940 as part of the 1939-1940 Flower-class building program. She was laid down at Collingwood Shipyards Ltd., Collingwood on 12 August 1940 and launched on 9 April 1941. She was commissioned into the RCN two months later on 19 June at Collingwood.

During her career, Moose Jaw underwent three significant overhauls. Her first took place after she ran aground in St. John's harbour. She underwent temporary repairs at St. John's until 5 March 1942, then left for Saint John, New Brunswick, for permanent repairs, which lasted until 25 June 1942. In September 1942 she took part in Operation Torch which required an increased AA armament. This refit took place in the United Kingdom. Her final major refit took place between December 1943 and March 1944 at Liverpool, Nova Scotia. During this refit, her fo'c'sle was extended.

== Service history ==
After arriving at Halifax, she was assigned to Newfoundland Command in August 1941. On the 5 September 1941, she sailed with Chambly on exercises. En route, they were ordered to reinforce the escort group protecting convoy SC 42. On 10 September 1941, Moose Jaw along with Chambly sank U-501 by depth charges and ramming in the Denmark Strait south of Tasiilaq, Greenland.

On the 11 September 1941 Moose Jaw and Kenogami rescued 41 survivors from the British merchant ship Berury, which had been torpedoed and sunk by the German submarine U-207 east of Cape Farewell, Greenland. In total, the convoy lost eighteen ships. Moose Jaw needed ten days repairs at Greenock due to the damage done while ramming U-501.

After repairs were completed she was sent to Tobermory for work ups in October. Upon completion of those, Moose Jaw spent the next four months escorting convoys between St. John's and Iceland. On January 10, 1942, Moose Jaw sailed with Escort Group N12 for Londonderry Port, the first all Canadian Escort Group to make the crossing. The group arrived at their destination thirteen days later. After boiler cleaning the group returned to St. John's with an ON Convoy.

In mid-February 1942 Moose Jaw ran aground off the south entrance of St. John's Harbour. Due to the extensive damage and need for refit, she was out of service until June 25, 1942. After workups, she was briefly assigned to the Western Local Escort Force before being sent across to the United Kingdom as part of Canada's contribution to Operation Torch in September. Moose Jaw spent the next five months escorting convoys between the United Kingdom and Gibraltar. She returned to Canada in April 1943.

In May 1943 she was assigned to Quebec Force, though later transferred to Gaspe Force. She underwent a refit beginning in December, lasting until May. After workups following the refit, Moose Jaw was assigned to Western Approaches Command, as part of Operation Neptune. She served in this capacity until September 1944, when she was reassigned to Escort Group EG 41 out of Plymouth. She escorted coastal convoys from Milford Haven until the end of the war. On 28 February 1945 Moose Jaw rescued six survivors from the British merchant ship Norfolk Coast, which was torpedoed and sunk by U-1302 south-west of Strumble Head.

Moose Jaw was paid off from the RCN on 8 July 1945 at Sorel, Quebec. The ship was sold for scrapping in September 1949 and broken up at Hamilton, Ontario.

== Quote ==
"Because the U-boats were operating against a slow-moving target it was to their advantage to break wireless silence in order to call in a gaggle of their friends and mount what they called a wolf-pack attack. Their system of attack was to concentrate ahead of the convoy at nightfall and allow the convoy to come to them while they saved the charge in their batteries. In one very serious battle, that connected with the convoy SC 42, it happened that two of my Newfoundland vessels had a week to spare and they were allowed to go on a training jaunt along the possible convoy routes in the vicinity of the East coast of Greenland, where U-boats were liable to be found, and by good luck, were in a position to reinforce the escort group involved. They joined the Convoy just at late dusk, coming down from ahead. In fact they came from outside the position of the U-boats waiting to attack. The U-boats had no eyes for anything but the Convoy ahead and did not expect attack from behind them. In this way the "Chambly" and "Moose Jaw" killed the RCN’s first U-boat"

— Leonard W. Murray, Commander-in-Chief, Canadian Northwest Atlantic, 1943-1945.
