= USS Muskeget =

Patrol vessel of the United States Navy

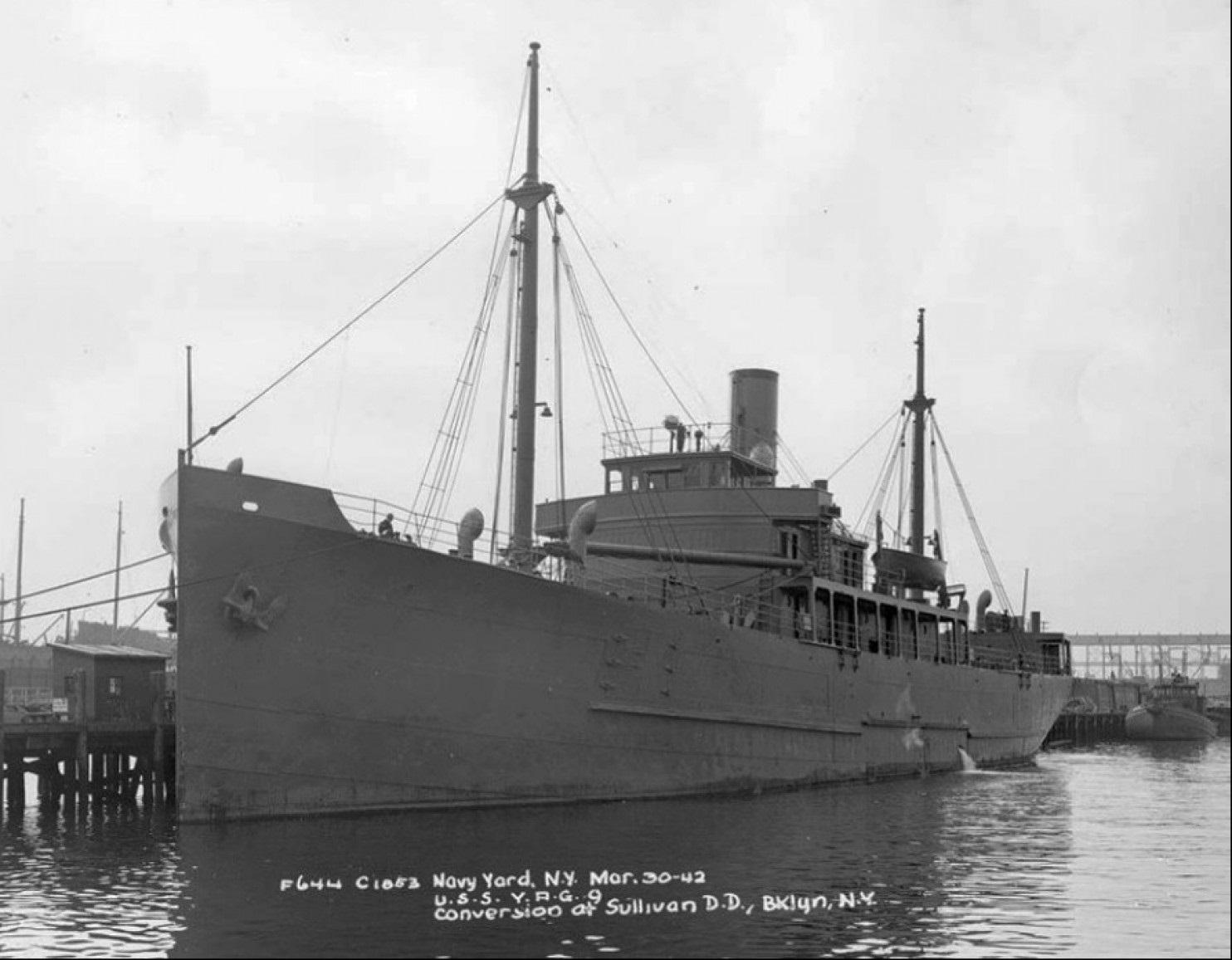
- USS YAG-9 at the New York Navy Yard in Brooklyn, New York, on 30 March 1942.

History

United States
- Name: SS Cornish
- Builder: Bethlehem Shipbuilding Corporation, Baltimore, Maryland
- Launched: 10 February 1923
- Completed: 1923
- Fate: Chartered to U.S. Navy 29 December 1941

United States Navy
- Name: USS YAG-9
- Acquired: 29 December 1941
- Refit: Sullivan Drydock and Repair Corporation, New York, New York
- Commissioned: 3 January 1942
- Renamed: USS Muskeget (AG-48), 30 May 1942
- Namesake: Muskeget Island, off Massachusetts
- Reclassified: From "miscellaneous district auxiliary" (YAG) to "miscellaneous auxiliary" (AG), 30 May 1942
- Decommissioned: 30 June 1942
- Stricken: 26 October 1943
- Fate: Loaned to U.S. Coast Guard 30 June 1942

United States Coast Guard
- Name: USCGC Muskeget (WAG-48)
- Namesake: Previous name retained
- Acquired: 30 June 1942
- Commissioned: 1 July 1942
- Fate: Sunk 9 September 1942

General characteristics
- Type: Patrol vessel and weather ship
- Tonnage: 370 gross register tons
- Displacement: 1,827 tons
- Length: 233 ft 6 in (71.2 m) overall
- Beam: 40 ft 2 in (12.2 m)
- Draft: 24 ft 3 in (7.4 m)
- Propulsion: one Hooven, Owens, Rentschler Company triple-expansion steam engine; two; Bethlehem Shipbuilding Corporation single-ended Scotch boilers, 190 psi; one screw; 1,300 shaft horsepower (69 kw)
- Speed: 11 knots
- Complement: 116 officers and enlisted
- Sensors & processing systems: QCL-8 sonar; no radar
- Armament: one single 4"/50 gun mount; one single 3"/50 gun mount; four single 20mm AA gun mounts; two depth charge tracks; four Y-guns; two Mousetraps

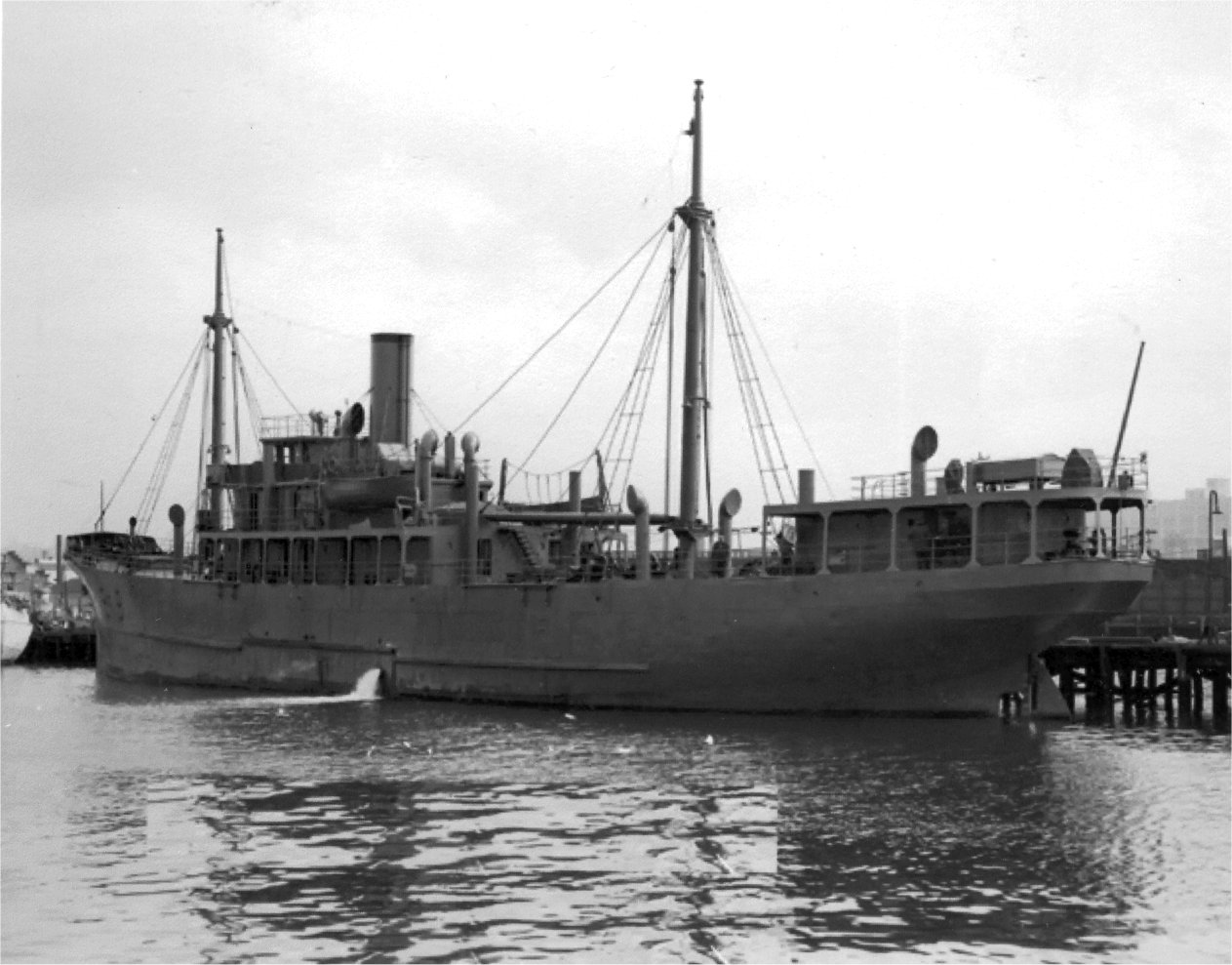
USS YAG-9

USS Muskeget (AG-48) – originally USS YAG-9 – was a former commercial cargo ship acquired by the United States Navy in 1941 for use during World War II. She was outfitted with a variety of guns, depth charge tracks, Y-guns, and Mousetrap and placed in service as a patrol vessel. Transferred to the United States Coast Guard for use as a weather ship in the North Atlantic Ocean and renamed USCGC Muskeget (WAG-48), she disappeared in September 1942 with the loss of all on board, the only U.S. weather ship lost during World War II. It was later determined that she had been sunk by a German submarine.

== Construction, commercial career, acquisition, and commissioning ==
Muskeget was built as the commercial cargo ship SS Cornish in 1923 by Bethlehem Shipbuilding Corporation at Sparrows Point in Baltimore, Maryland. Crewed by 34 merchant seamen, Cornish operated on the Great Lakes.

The U.S. Navy acquired Cornish under charter from Eastern Shipbuilding Lines, Inc., of Boston, Massachusetts, on 29 December 1941. She was converted at a cost of $250,000 for use as a patrol vessel by the Sullivan Drydock and Repair Corporation of New York City, classified as a "miscellaneous district auxiliary" (YAG), and commissioned as the patrol vessel USS YAG-9 on 3 January 1942.

== World War II service ==
=== U.S. Navy service ===
Assigned to the 3rd Naval District, YAG-9 performed patrol duty off New York City. She was reclassified as a "miscellaneous auxiliary" (AG) and renamed USS Muskeget (AG-48) on 30 May 1942.

=== U.S. Coast Guard service ===
On 30 June 1942, the Navy transferred Muskeget to the United States Coast Guard for service as a weather ship. Commissioned into the Coast Guard as USCGC Muskeget (WAG-48) on 1 July 1942, she was assigned Boston, Massachusetts, as her home port and to duty with the North Atlantic Weather Patrol. Meteorologists used weather balloons launched from her deck to gather data on pressure, winds, temperatures, and humidity to support weather forecasts in support of Allied military operations.

Muskeget departed Boston on 6 July 1942 for her first weather patrol, which took place at Weather Station No. 2 in the North Atlantic Ocean off the southern tip of Greenland. She concluded this patrol on 27 July 1942.

On 24 August 1942, Muskeget departed Boston for her second weather patrol, again at Weather Station No. 2. She issued the first weather report of her patrol on 28 August and arrived on station on 31 August. After she issued a weather report on 9 September 1942, Allied forces did not see or hear from her again.

=== Loss ===
At 14:54 hours on 9 September 1942, the German Navy submarine U-755, operating as part of a wolfpack, sighted Muskeget emerging from a rain squall in a heavy swell about 400 nautical miles (740 km; 460 mi) east of Newfoundland and misidentified her as an auxiliary merchant cruiser. U-755, commanded by Kapitänleutnant Walter Göing, fired two torpedoes, heard the sounds of Muskeget's boilers exploding and bulkheads collapsing as she sank, then surfaced and found a life raft and survivors in the water, but little wreckage. U-755 departed the area, but returned a few hours later to find a large oil slick and two life rafts tied together with eight men on them. As they shouted at U-755, Göing thought he heard them say that they were from an American ship named Muskogee, Mukited, or something similar. U-755 then again departed the area.

Muskeget was due to be relieved on station by the Coast Guard weather ship USCGC Monomoy (WAG-275). Monomoy reported on 11 September 1942 that she could not contact Muskeget, and arrived at Weather Station No. 2 on 13 September 1942 to find no sign of Muskeget. When Monomoy again reported her inability to contact Muskeget on 15 September, Allied ships and aircraft were ordered to search for the missing ship. Their search, on 16 September 1942, found no sign of Muskeget, nor did Monomoy find any trace of Muskeget or her crew while operating at Weather Station No. 2 continuously until 22 September 1942.

When Muskeget was overdue in returning to Boston later in September 1942, she was presumed lost with her entire complement of nine officers, 107 enlisted men, one United States Public Health Service officer, and four civilian United States Weather Bureau meteorologists. Monomoy concluded her weather patrol on 1 October 1942 and, upon arrival at Boston on 12 October, reported 20 to 35 German submarines operating within striking range of the weather station, shadowing the two or more Allied convoys which passed each day through the area in which Weather Station No. 2 was located.

No bodies were ever recovered, and Muskeget's wreck was never found. On 10 September 1943, the U.S. Navy and U.S. Coast Guard officially declared all on board Muskeget to have been killed in action, and on 26 October 1943 she was struck from the Navy List. Only later did it become known that U-755 had sunk her.

Muskeget was the only U.S. weather ship lost during World War II.

== Belated Purple Heart for meteorologists ==
Although the other personnel lost with Muskeget all received a posthumous award of the Purple Heart, the four civilian Weather Bureau meteorologists – Luther H. Brady, Lester S. Fodor, George F. Kubach, and Edward Weber – did not. In ca. 2012, researchers from the U.S. Coast Guard and the National Oceanic and Atmospheric Administration – which oversees the U.S. National Weather Service, the successor organization to the Weather Bureau – detected the oversight and the circumstances of their deaths, which occurred at a time when civilians killed in action qualified for the Purple Heart. The four men received the Purple Heart posthumously in a ceremony at the Naval Heritage Center auditorium at the United States Navy Memorial in Washington, D.C., on 19 November 2015.

== Commemoration ==
American Legion Post 2543 in Plattsmouth, Nebraska, is named for Fireman First Class Harold Wolever, Jr., a Coast Guardsman who died in the sinking of Muskeget.
