= German submarine U-501 =

German World War II submarine

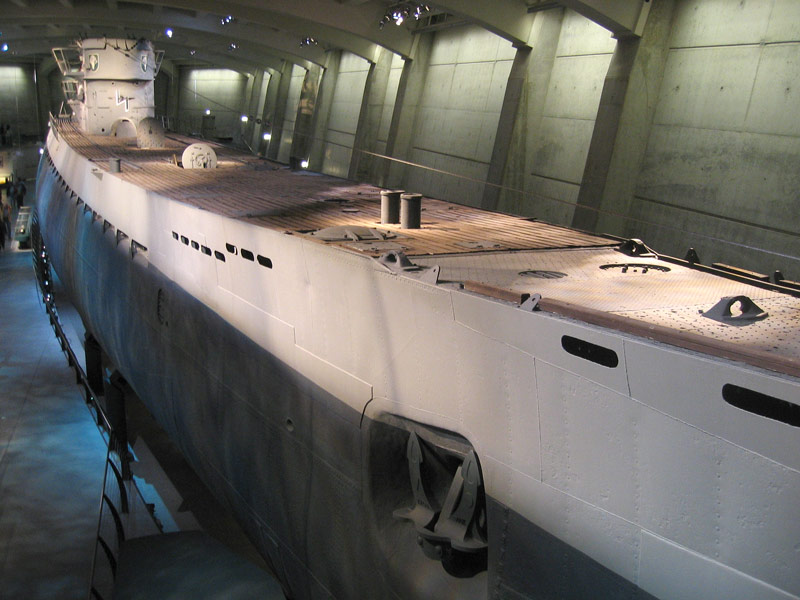
- U-505, a typical Type IXC boat

History

Nazi Germany
- Name: U-501
- Ordered: 25 September 1939
- Builder: Deutsche Werft, Hamburg
- Yard number: 291
- Laid down: 12 February 1940
- Launched: 25 January 1941
- Commissioned: 30 April 1941
- Fate: Sunk on 10 September 1941

General characteristics
- Class & type: Type IXC submarine
- Displacement: 1,120 t (1,100 long tons) surfaced; 1,232 t (1,213 long tons) submerged
- Length: 76.76 m (251 ft 10 in) o/a; 58.75 m (192 ft 9 in) pressure hull
- Beam: 6.76 m (22 ft 2 in) o/a; 4.40 m (14 ft 5 in) pressure hull
- Height: 9.60 m (31 ft 6 in)
- Draught: 4.70 m (15 ft 5 in)
- Installed power: 4,400 PS (3,200 kW; 4,300 bhp) (diesels); 1,000 PS (740 kW; 990 shp) (electric)
- Propulsion: 2 shafts; 2 × diesel engines; 2 × electric motors
- Speed: 18.2 knots (33.7 km/h; 20.9 mph) surfaced; 7.7 knots (14.3 km/h; 8.9 mph) submerged
- Range: 13,450 nmi (24,910 km; 15,480 mi) at 10 knots (19 km/h; 12 mph) surfaced; 64 nmi (119 km; 74 mi) at 4 knots (7.4 km/h; 4.6 mph) submerged
- Test depth: 230 m (750 ft)
- Complement: 4 officers, 44 enlisted
- Armament: 6 × torpedo tubes (4 bow, 2 stern); 22 × 53.3 cm (21 in) torpedoes; 1 × 10.5 cm (4.1 in) SK C/32 deck gun (180 rounds); 1 × 3.7 cm (1.5 in) SK C/30 AA gun; 1 × 2 cm FlaK 30 AA guns

Service record
- Part of: 2nd U-boat Flotilla; 30 April – 10 September 1941
- Identification codes: M 34 178
- Commanders: K.Kapt. Hugo Förster; 30 April – 10 September 1941
- Operations: 1 patrol: 7 August – 10 September 1941
- Victories: 1 merchant ship sunk (2,000 GRT)

German submarine U-501 was a Type IXC U-boat of Nazi Germany's Kriegsmarine during World War II. The submarine was laid down on 12 February 1940 at the Deutsche Werft yard in Hamburg, launched on 25 January 1941 and commissioned on 30 April 1941 under the command of Korvettenkapitän Hugo Förster. The boat served with the 2nd U-boat Flotilla until she was sunk on 10 September 1941.

== Design ==
German Type IXC submarines were slightly larger than the original Type IXBs. U-501 had a displacement of 1,120 tonnes (1,100 long tons) when at the surface and 1,232 tonnes (1,213 long tons) while submerged. The U-boat had a total length of 76.76 m (251 ft 10 in), a pressure hull length of 58.75 m (192 ft 9 in), a beam of 6.76 m (22 ft 2 in), a height of 9.60 m (31 ft 6 in), and a draught of 4.70 m (15 ft 5 in). The submarine was powered by two MAN M 9 V 40/46 supercharged four-stroke, nine-cylinder diesel engines producing a total of 4,400 metric horsepower (3,240 kW; 4,340 shp) for use while surfaced, two Siemens-Schuckert 2 GU 345/34 double-acting electric motors producing a total of 1,000 shaft horsepower (1,010 PS; 750 kW) for use while submerged. She had two shafts and two 1.92 m (6 ft 3 5/8 in) propellers. The boat was capable of operating at depths of up to 230 metres (750 ft).

The submarine had a maximum surface speed of 18.3 knots (33.9 km/h; 21.1 mph) and a maximum submerged speed of 7.3 knots (13.5 km/h; 8.4 mph). When submerged, the boat could operate for 63 nautical miles (117 km; 72 mi) at 4 knots (7.4 km/h; 4.6 mph); when surfaced, she could travel 13,450 nautical miles (24,910 km; 15,480 mi) at 10 knots (19 km/h; 12 mph). U-501 was fitted with six 53.3 cm (21 in) torpedo tubes (four fitted at the bow and two at the stern), 22 torpedoes, one 10.5 cm (4.13 in) SK C/32 naval gun, 180 rounds, and a 3.7 cm (1.5 in) SK C/30 as well as a 2 cm (0.79 in) C/30 anti-aircraft gun. The boat had a complement of forty-eight.

== Service history ==
U-501 departed from Kiel on 2 July 1941 and sailed to Trondheim in Norway via Horten Naval Base also in Norway, by 15 July. From there she sailed on her first and only war patrol on 7 August 1941, heading out into the waters around Iceland. She sank the 2,000 GRT Norwegian merchant ship Einvik, a straggler from Convoy SC 41 on 5 September, about 450 miles (720 km) south-west of Iceland, with a torpedo and gunfire. The ship's distress signals were received and an aircraft sent to search for her, but it found nothing and reported that there were probably no survivors. In fact all 23 crew members were in two lifeboats heading for Iceland, which they reached on 12 and 13 September.

=== Sinking ===
Five days later, on the night of 10 September, U-501 was taking part in a mass attack on Allied Convoy SC 42 in the Denmark Strait south of Tasiilaq, Greenland, in position 62°50′N 37°50′W, when she was detected by the Canadian Flower-class corvette HMCS Chambly with sonar, and damaged with depth charges. U-501's captain, Hugo Förster, decided to scuttle the U-boat. On the surface, she was spotted by the corvette HMCS Moose Jaw, which attempted to ram her. However, U-501 turned at the last moment so that the two vessels were running parallel, only feet apart. For unknown reasons, Hugo Förster surrendered himself and abandoned his command by leaping from the submarine's bridge to the deck of the Moose Jaw.

The Moose Jaw veered away and the U-boat's first watch officer took command; he continued with the scuttling. A nine-man party from the Chambly got on board the U-501 in an attempt to seize secret papers, but the submarine sank under their feet. One Canadian sailor and eleven Germans died. The remaining thirty-five crewmen were taken prisoner. Förster was repatriated to Germany in 1945 during a prisoner exchange. He later committed suicide, criticisms from fellow U-Boat commanders noted as a contributing factor.

This was the first U-boat kill by the Royal Canadian Navy during the Battle of the Atlantic.

=== Wolfpacks ===
U-501 took part in two wolfpacks, namely:

- Grönland (10 – 27 August 1941)
- Markgraf (27 August – 10 September 1941)

== Summary of raiding history ==
Date	Ship Name	Nationality	Tonnage (GRT)	Fate
5 September 1941	Einvik	Norway	2,000	Sunk

== Bibliography ==
- Blair, Clay, Hitler's U-Boat War: The Hunters 1939-41 (1999), Weidenfeld & Nicolson, New York. ISBN 0-394-58839-8
- Busch, Rainer; Röll, Hans-Joachim (1999). German U-boat commanders of World War II : a biographical dictionary. Translated by Brooks, Geoffrey. London, Annapolis, Md: Greenhill Books, Naval Institute Press. ISBN 1-55750-186-6.
- Busch, Rainer; Röll, Hans-Joachim (1999). Deutsche U-Boot-Verluste von September 1939 bis Mai 1945 [German U-boat losses from September 1939 to May 1945]. Der U-Boot-Krieg (in German). Vol. IV. Hamburg, Berlin, Bonn: Mittler. ISBN 3-8132-0514-2.
- Gröner, Erich; Jung, Dieter; Maass, Martin (1991). U-boats and Mine Warfare Vessels. German Warships 1815–1945. Vol. 2. Translated by Thomas, Keith; Magowan, Rachel. London: Conway Maritime Press. ISBN 0-85177-593-4.
