= German submarine U-82 (1941) =

German World War II submarine

History

Nazi Germany
- Name: U-82
- Ordered: 25 January 1939
- Builder: Bremer Vulkan, Bremen-Vegesack
- Yard number: 10
- Laid down: 15 May 1940
- Launched: 15 March 1941
- Commissioned: 14 May 1941
- Fate: Sunk on 6 February 1942

General characteristics
- Class & type: Type VIIC U-boat
- Displacement: 769 tonnes (757 long tons) surfaced; 871 t (857 long tons) submerged
- Length: 67.10 m (220 ft 2 in) o/a; 50.50 m (165 ft 8 in) pressure hull
- Beam: 6.20 m (20 ft 4 in) o/a; 4.70 m (15 ft 5 in) pressure hull
- Height: 9.60 m (31 ft 6 in)
- Draught: 4.72 m (15 ft 6 in)
- Installed power: 2,800–3,200 PS (2,100–2,400 kW; 2,800–3,200 bhp) (diesels); 750 PS (550 kW; 740 shp) (electric)
- Propulsion: 2 shafts; 2 × diesel engines; 2 × electric motors
- Speed: 17.7 knots (32.8 km/h; 20.4 mph) surfaced; 7.6 knots (14.1 km/h; 8.7 mph) submerged
- Range: 8,500 nmi (15,700 km; 9,800 mi) at 10 knots (19 km/h; 12 mph) surfaced; 80 nmi (150 km; 92 mi) at 4 knots (7.4 km/h; 4.6 mph) submerged
- Test depth: 230 m (750 ft); Calculated crush depth: 250–295 m (820–968 ft)
- Complement: 44-52 officers & ratings
- Armament: 5 × 53.3 cm (21 in) torpedo tubes (four bow, one stern); 14 × torpedoes or 26 TMA mines; 1 × 8.8 cm (3.46 in) deck gun (220 rounds); 1 x 2 cm (0.79 in) C/30 AA gun

Service record
- Part of: 3rd U-boat Flotilla; 14 May 1941 – 6 February 1942
- Identification codes: M 40 885
- Commanders: Oblt.z.S. / Kptlt. Siegfried Rollmann; 14 May 1941 – 6 February 1942
- Operations: 3 patrols: 1st patrol: 11 August – 18 September 1941; 2nd patrol: 15 October – 19 November 1941; 3rd patrol: 11 January – 6 February 1942
- Victories: 8 merchant ships sunk (51,859 GRT); 1 warship sunk (1,190 tons); 1 merchant ship damaged (1,999 GRT)

German submarine U-82 was a Type VIIC U-boat of Nazi Germany's Kriegsmarine during World War II.

Her keel was laid down on 15 May 1940 by Bremer Vulkan-Vegesacker Werft of Bremen as yard number 10. She was launched on 15 March 1941 and commissioned on 14 May with Oberleutnant zur See Siegfried Rollmann in command. U-82 conducted three patrols, sinking eight merchant ships for a total of 51,859 gross register tons (GRT), one warship of 1,190 tons and damaging another merchantman of 1,999 GRT.

== Design ==
German Type VIIC submarines were preceded by the shorter Type VIIB submarines. U-82 had a displacement of 769 tonnes (757 long tons) when at the surface and 871 tonnes (857 long tons) while submerged. She had a total length of 67.10 m (220 ft 2 in), a pressure hull length of 50.50 m (165 ft 8 in), a beam of 6.20 m (20 ft 4 in), a height of 9.60 m (31 ft 6 in), and a draught of 4.74 m (15 ft 7 in). The submarine was powered by two MAN M 6 V 40/46 four-stroke, six-cylinder supercharged diesel engines producing a total of 2,800 to 3,200 metric horsepower (2,060 to 2,350 kW; 2,760 to 3,160 shp) for use while surfaced, two Brown, Boveri & Cie GG UB 720/8 double-acting electric motors producing a total of 750 metric horsepower (550 kW; 740 shp) for use while submerged. She had two shafts and two 1.23 m (4 ft) propellers. The boat was capable of operating at depths of up to 230 metres (750 ft).

The submarine had a maximum surface speed of 17.7 knots (32.8 km/h; 20.4 mph) and a maximum submerged speed of 7.6 knots (14.1 km/h; 8.7 mph). When submerged, the boat could operate for 80 nautical miles (150 km; 92 mi) at 4 knots (7.4 km/h; 4.6 mph); when surfaced, she could travel 8,500 nautical miles (15,700 km; 9,800 mi) at 10 knots (19 km/h; 12 mph). U-82 was fitted with five 53.3 cm (21 in) torpedo tubes (four fitted at the bow and one at the stern), fourteen torpedoes, one 8.8 cm (3.46 in) SK C/35 naval gun, 220 rounds, and a 2 cm (0.79 in) C/30 anti-aircraft gun. The boat had a complement of between forty-four and sixty.

== Service history ==
U-82 conducted three patrols whilst serving with the 3rd U-boat Flotilla from 14 May 1941 to 6 February 1942 when she was sunk. She was a member of four wolfpacks.

=== First patrol ===
The boat's first patrol began with her departure from Trondheim in Norway on 11 August 1941 after moving from Kiel in July. Her route took her across the Norwegian Sea and through the gap separating Iceland and the Faroe Islands toward the Atlantic Ocean.

She sank the Empire Hudson northeast of Greenland on 10 September 1941 followed by four more ships: the Bulysees, the Gypsum Queen, the Empire Crossbill and the Scania, all on the 11th.

U-82 then docked at Lorient on the French Atlantic coast on 5 July.

=== Second patrol ===
The boat sank two more ships on her second foray but when she returned to France she went to La Pallice on 19 November 1941.

=== Third patrol and loss ===
On her final patrol, U-82 sank Athelcrown, and Leiesten in mid-Atlantic. At the end of January she attacked and sank HMS Belmont, a US-built, Town-class destroyer, south of Newfoundland. On 6 February 1942, while returning from patrol, she encountered convoy OS 18 north-east of the Azores. While attempting to attack she was sunk with all 45 of her crew by depth charges from the British sloop HMS Rochester and the corvette HMS Tamarisk.

== Summary of raiding history ==
Date	Ship	Nationality	Tonnage (Note: Merchant ship tonnages are in gross register tons. Military vessels are listed by tons displacement.)	Fate
10 September 1941	Empire Hudson	United Kingdom	7,465	Sunk
11 September 1941	Bulysses	United Kingdom	7,519	Sunk
11 September 1941	Empire Crossbill	United Kingdom	5,463	Sunk
11 September 1941	Gypsum Queen	United Kingdom	3,915	Sunk
11 September 1941	Scania	Sweden	1,999	Damaged
21 October 1941	Treverbyn	United Kingdom	5,281	Sunk
21 October 1941	Serbino	United Kingdom	4,099	Sunk
22 January 1942	Athelcrown	United Kingdom	11,999	Sunk
23 January 1942	Leisten	Norway	6,118	Sunk
31 January 1942	HMS Belmont	Royal Navy	1,190	Sunk

== Bibliography ==
- Busch, Rainer; Röll, Hans-Joachim (1999). German U-boat commanders of World War II : a biographical dictionary. Translated by Brooks, Geoffrey. London, Annapolis, Md: Greenhill Books, Naval Institute Press. ISBN 1-55750-186-6.
- Busch, Rainer; Röll, Hans-Joachim (1999). Der U-Boot-Krieg, 1939-1945: Deutsche U-Boot-Verluste von September 1939 bis Mai 1945 [German U-boat losses from September 1939 to May 1945] (in German). Vol. IV. Hamburg, Berlin, Bonn: Mittler. ISBN 3-8132-0514-2.
- Gröner, Eric; Jung, Dieter; Maass, Martin (1991). German Warships 1815-1945: U-boats and Mine Warfare Vessels. Vol. 2. Translated by Thomas, Keith; Magowan, Rachel. London: Conway Maritime Press. ISBN 0-85177-593-4.
- Kemp, Paul (1999). U-Boats Destroyed - German Submarine Losses in the World Wars. London: Arms & Armour. ISBN 1-85409-515-3.
- Niestle, Axel (1998). German U-Boat Losses During World War II. Greenhill. ISBN 1-85367-352-8.
