= G and H-class destroyer =

Ship class

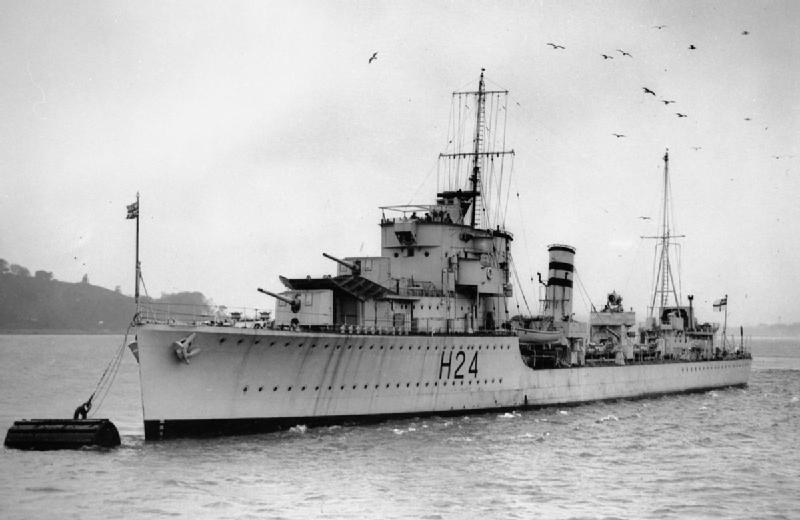
- HMS Hasty in 1936

Class overview
- Operators: Royal Navy; Royal Hellenic Navy; Brazilian Navy; Argentine Navy; Polish Navy; Royal Canadian Navy; Dominican Navy; Royal Netherlands Navy
- Preceded by: E and F class
- Succeeded by: I class
- Subclasses: G, H, Havant
- Built: 1934–1940
- In commission: 1936–1964
- Completed: 24
- Lost: 17
- Scrapped: 7

General characteristics (G- and H-class as built)
- Displacement: 1,340–1,350 long tons (1,360–1,370 t) (standard); 1,854–1,860 long tons (1,884–1,890 t) (deep load)
- Length: 323 ft (98.5 m) (o/a)
- Beam: 33 ft (10.1 m)
- Draught: 12 ft 6 in (3.8 m)
- Installed power: 3 Admiralty 3-drum boilers; 34,000 shp (25,000 kW)
- Propulsion: 2 shafts; 2 geared steam turbines
- Speed: 35.5 knots (65.7 km/h; 40.9 mph)
- Range: 5,530 nmi (10,240 km; 6,360 mi) at 15 knots (28 km/h; 17 mph)
- Complement: 137 (peacetime), 146 (wartime)
- Sensors & processing systems: ASDIC
- Armament: 4 × single 4.7 in (120 mm) guns; 2 × quadruple 0.5 in (12.7 mm) AA machine guns; 2 × quadruple 21 in (533 mm) torpedo tubes; 1 × depth charge rack, 2 × throwers, 20 × depth charges

General characteristics (Havant class, where different)
- Armament: 3 × single 4.7 in (120 mm) guns; Up to 110 depth charges

General characteristics (Grenville & Hardy, where different)
- Displacement: 1,445–1,465 long tons (1,468–1,489 t) (standard); 1,953–2,033 long tons (1,984–2,066 t) (deep load)
- Length: 330–337 ft (100.6–102.7 m) (o/a)
- Beam: 33.75–34 ft (10.3–10.4 m)
- Installed power: 38,000 shp (28,000 kW)
- Complement: 175
- Armament: 5 × single 4.7 in (120 mm) guns

The G- and H-class destroyers were a group of 18 destroyers built for the Royal Navy during the 1930s. Six additional ships being built for the Brazilian Navy when World War II began in 1939 were purchased by the British and named the Havant class. The design was a major export success with other ships built for the Argentine and Royal Hellenic Navies. They were assigned to the Mediterranean Fleet upon completion and enforced the Non-Intervention Agreement during the Spanish Civil War of 1936–1939.

Most ships were recalled home or were sent to the North Atlantic from October to November 1939, after it became clear that Fascist Italy was not going to intervene in World War II. Then they began to escort convoys and patrol for German submarines and commerce raiders. Two ships were lost to German mines in the first six months of the war. Three more were lost during the Norwegian Campaign, one in combat with a German cruiser and two during the First Battle of Narvik in April 1940. The Battle of France was the next test for the destroyers from May to June, with many of the Gs and Havants participating in the evacuation of Dunkirk and the subsequent evacuations of Allied troops from western France. Three ships were sunk, two by bombs and the other by torpedoes. Most of the H-class ships were sent to the Mediterranean in May in case Mussolini decided to attack France and the majority of the surviving Gs were sent to Force H at Gibraltar in July. Two of them, Griffin and Greyhound, participated in the Battle of Dakar, before being assigned to the Mediterranean Fleet with their sister ships. By the end of the year, the ships participated in several battles with the Royal Italian Navy, losing two to Italian mines and torpedoes, while sinking two Italian submarines. The Havants spent most of the war in the North Atlantic on convoy escort duties, losing half their number to German submarines, while helping to sink six in exchange by the end of the war.

The G- and H-class ships of the Mediterranean Fleet escorted numerous Malta convoys, participated in the Battle of Cape Matapan in March 1941 and covered the evacuation of troops from Greece and Crete from May to June, losing two to German bombers and another so badly damaged that she was later written off. By the end of the year, they had sunk three submarines, two Italian and one German. Three Hs participated in the Second Battle of Sirte in March 1942, during which one was damaged. Further damaged by aerial attacks, she was ordered to Gibraltar and ran aground in transit and had to be destroyed. Another was torpedoed and lost during Operation Vigorous in June. The ships sank two more submarines during 1942 and three destroyers began conversion to escort destroyers late that year and early in 1943. Two of the four surviving Gs and Hs were transferred to the Royal Canadian Navy (RCN) while under conversion. All of the surviving ships joined their Havant half-sisters on escort duty in the North Atlantic in 1943.

One ship was sent to the Mediterranean in 1944 while three others were transferred to the UK in preparation for Operation Overlord. Between them they sank five German submarines in 1944 with another in 1945. Worn-out and obsolete, the survivors were either broken up for scrap or sold off after the war.

== Design and description (G and H classes) ==
The G class were ordered as part of the 1933 Naval Construction Programme, the H class following in 1934. These ships were based on the preceding F class, but the elimination of cruising turbines and the development of more compact machinery allowed their dimensions and displacement to be slightly reduced. The H class were repeats of the G's with some minor differences. All of the destroyers were fitted with ASDIC (sonar) and the ability to use the Two-Speed Destroyer Sweep (TSDS) minesweeping gear.

The G- and H-class destroyers displaced 1,340–1,350 long tons (1,360–1,370 t) at standard load and 1,854–1,860 long tons (1,884–1,890 t) at deep load. The ships had an overall length of 323 feet (98.5 m), a beam of 33 feet (10.1 m) and a draught of 12 feet 6 inches (3.8 m). Their peacetime complement was 137 officers and ratings, which was intended to increase to 146 in wartime. The ships were at their stability limit as built and the Director of Naval Construction believed that no additions in top weight should be made without an equal amount of weight being removed.

They were powered by two Parsons geared steam turbines, each driving one propeller shaft, using steam provided by three Admiralty 3-drum boilers that operated at a pressure of 300 psi (2,068 kPa; 21 kgf/cm^{2}) and a temperature of 620 °F (327 °C). Hyperion was fitted with one Johnson boiler in her aft boiler room. The turbines developed a total of 34,000 shaft horsepower (25,000 kW) and gave a maximum speed of 35.5 knots (65.7 km/h; 40.9 mph). The destroyers carried a maximum of 450–475 long tons (457–483 t) of fuel oil that gave them a range of 5,500 nautical miles (10,200 km; 6,300 mi) at 15 knots (28 km/h; 17 mph).

All of the ships had the same main armament, four quick-firing (QF) 4.7-inch (120 mm) Mark IX guns in single mounts, designated 'A', 'B', 'X', and 'Y' from front to rear. The guns had a maximum elevation of 40°; the G class achieved this with a lowered section of the deck around the mount, the "well", that allowed the breech of the gun to be lowered below deck height, but the new gun mount used in the H class was designed to reach that elevation without the necessity for the clumsy "wells". They fired a 50-pound (23 kg) shell at a muzzle velocity of 2,650 ft/s (810 m/s) to a range of 16,970 yards (15,520 m). Hereward served as the testbed for the twin 4.7-inch gun mount used for the Tribal and the J, K and N classes that temporarily replaced 'B' gun. For anti-aircraft (AA) defence, they had two quadruple mounts for the QF 0.5-inch Vickers Mk III machine gun on platforms between the funnels. The G- and H-class ships were fitted with two quadruple mounts for 21-inch (533 mm) torpedo tubes, although Glowworm trialled the new quintuple mount. The ships were also equipped with two throwers and one rack for 20 depth charges.

The main guns were controlled by an Admiralty Fire Control Clock Mk I that used data derived from the manually operated director-control tower and the separate rangefinder situated above the bridge. They had no capability for anti-aircraft fire and the anti-aircraft guns were aimed solely by eye. Hero and Hereward saw the introduction of a new style of bridge that would become standard on all Royal Navy fleet destroyers from the I class through to the Battle class of 1944. This was necessary as Hereward was fitted with a prototype twin-gun mounting that had a trunnion height 13 inches (33.0 cm) higher than the previous weapons, therefore it was necessary to raise the wheelhouse to allow the helmsman to see over the top. Raising the wheelhouse meant it had to be placed in front of, rather than underneath, the bridge, and it was given angled sides, resulting in a characteristic wedge shape with a sloping roof.

=== Wartime modifications ===
Beginning in May 1940, the after bank of torpedo tubes was removed and replaced with a QF 12-pounder Mk V anti-aircraft gun, the after mast and funnel being cut down to improve the gun's field of fire. Four to eight QF 20 mm Oerlikon cannons were added to the surviving ships, usually replacing the .50-calibre machine gun mounts between the funnels. One pair of these was added to the bridge wings and the other pair was mounted abreast the searchlight platform. Early in the war, depth charge stowage increased to 44. By 1943, only four ships were still afloat and all had the 'Y' gun on the quarterdeck removed to allow for additional depth charge stowage and two additional depth charge throwers. The 12-pounder was removed to allow for the installation of a Huff-Duff radio direction finder on a short mainmast and for more depth charges. All of the survivors, except Garland, had 'A' or 'B' gun replaced by a Hedgehog anti-submarine spigot mortar, and their director-control tower and rangefinder above the bridge removed in exchange for a Type 271 target-indication radar. 'A' gun was later replaced in Hotspur while Hero had exchanged 'B' gun for a Hedgehog and a twin-gun mount for QF six-pounder Hotchkiss guns for use against U-boats at very close range. A Type 286 short-range, surface-search radar, adapted from the Royal Air Force's ASV radar, was also added. The early models, however, could only scan directly forward and had to be aimed by turning the entire ship.

=== Flotilla leaders ===
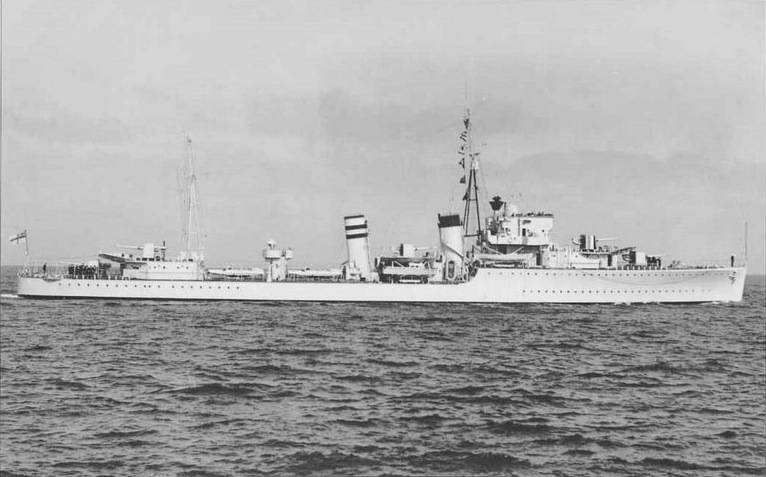
Hardy, 1936

As per the E and F class, the flotilla leaders were built to an enlarged design, incorporating a fifth 4.7-inch gun in 'Q' position, between the funnels and were based on the F-class leader, Faulknor. Grenville was shorter and heavier than Hardy as she used compact Yarrow-type side fired boilers while Hardy was slightly beamier. They displaced 1,445–1,465 long tons (1,468–1,489 t) at standard load and 1,953–2,033 long tons (1,984–2,066 t) at deep load. The ships had an overall length of 330–337 feet (100.6–102.7 m), a beam of 33.75–34 feet (10.3–10.4 m) and a draught of 12 feet 6 inches (3.8 m). The ships carried a total of 175 personnel which included the staff of the Captain (D), commanding officer of the flotilla. Their turbines were 2,000 shp (1,500 kW) more powerful than the private ships, which made them 0.5 knots (0.93 km/h; 0.58 mph) faster; their propulsion machinery was otherwise identical. Both ships were early wartime losses and consequently received no modifications.

== Havant class ==
The Havants were laid down in 1938 for Brazil and requisitioned on 5 September 1939. They were optimized for anti-submarine work and were completed without 'Y' gun and were equipped with eight throwers and three racks for a total of 110 depth charges. Unlike their half-sisters, they were fitted with a combined rangefinder-director above the bridge. Wartime modifications were similar to the other G- and H-class ships as a 12-pounder AA gun replaced the aft torpedo tubes, 20 mm Oerlikons were added on the bridge wings and a Type 286 radar was installed. Later modifications replaced the .50-calibre machine guns with a pair of Oerlikons, a Type 271 radar was added that replaced the rangefinder-director, a Hedgehog was substituted for 'A' gun, the 12-pounder removed for more depth charge stowage, and a HF/DF mast was installed aft.

== Ships ==
=== Royal Navy ===
==== G class ====
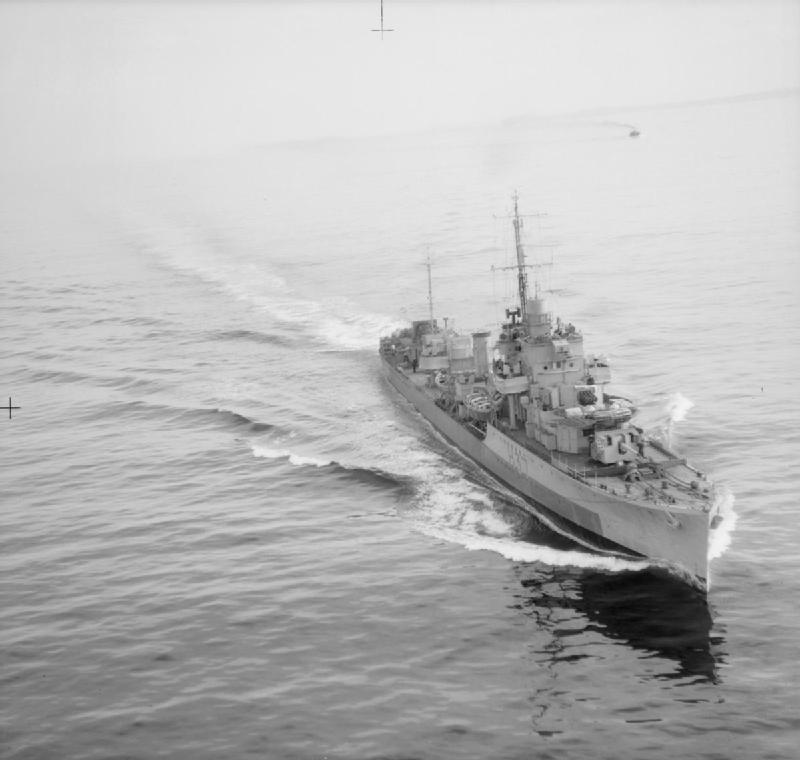
Aerial view of Garland

Construction data
Ship	Builder	Laid down	Launched	Completed	Fate
Gallant	Alexander Stephen and Sons, Linthouse	15 September 1934	26 September 1935	25 February 1936	Wrecked by German bombers, declared a constructive total loss, 20 January 1941
Garland	Fairfield Shipbuilding & Engineering Company, Govan	22 August 1934	24 October 1935	3 March 1936	Sold to the Royal Dutch Navy, 14 November 1947 and converted into a training ship, scrapped, 1964
Gipsy	Fairfield Shipbuilding & Engineering Company, Govan	4 September 1934	7 November 1935	22 February 1936	Sunk by a mine, 21 November 1939
Glowworm	John I. Thornycroft & Company, Woolston	15 August 1934	22 July 1935	22 January 1936	Sunk by the German heavy cruiser Admiral Hipper, 8 April 1940
Grafton	John I. Thornycroft & Company, Woolston	30 August 1934	18 September 1935	20 March 1936	Sunk by the German submarine U-62, 29 May 1940
Grenade	Alexander Stephen and Sons, Linthouse	3 October 1934	12 November 1935	28 March 1936	Sunk by German aircraft, 29 May 1940
Grenville (Flotilla leader)	Yarrow & Company, Scotstoun	29 September 1934	15 August 1935	1 July 1936	Sunk by a mine, 19 January 1940
Greyhound	Vickers Armstrongs, Barrow-in-Furness	20 September 1934	15 August 1935	1 February 1936	Sunk by German aircraft, 22 May 1941
Griffin	Vickers Armstrongs, Barrow-in-Furness	20 September 1934	15 August 1935	6 March 1936	Transferred to the RCN, 1 March 1943; scrapped, August 1946

==== H class ====
Construction data
Ship	Builder	Laid down	Launched	Completed	Fate
Hardy (Flotilla leader)	Cammell Laird & Company, Birkenhead	30 May 1935	7 April 1936	11 December 1936	Sunk by German destroyers, 10 April 1940
Hasty	William Denny & Brothers, Dumbarton	15 April 1935	5 May 1936	11 November 1936	Sunk by German E-boat, 15 June 1942
Havock	William Denny & Brothers, Dumbarton	15 May 1935	7 July 1936	16 January 1937	Ran aground and wrecked, 6 April 1942
Hereward	Vickers Armstrongs, Walker	28 February 1935	10 March 1936	9 December 1936	Sunk by German aircraft, 28 May 1941
Hero	Vickers Armstrongs, Walker	28 February 1935	10 March 1936	21 October 1936	Transferred to the RCN, 15 November 1943, and sold for scrap, 1946
Hostile	Scotts Shipbuilding & Engineering Company, Greenock	27 February 1935	24 January 1936	10 September 1936	Crippled by a mine and scuttled, 23 August 1940
Hotspur	Scotts Shipbuilding & Engineering Company, Greenock	27 February 1935	23 March 1936	29 December 1936	Sold to the Dominican Navy, 23 November 1948, and scrapped 1972
Hunter	Swan Hunter, Wallsend	27 March 1935	25 February 1936	30 September 1936	Sunk by German destroyers, 10 April 1940
Hyperion	Swan Hunter, Wallsend	27 March 1935	8 April 1936	3 December 1936	Crippled by a mine and scuttled, 22 December 1940

==== Havant class ====
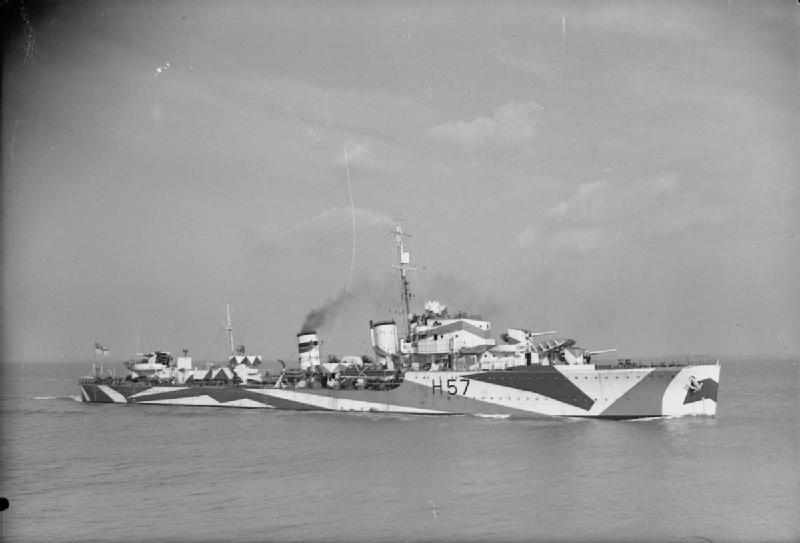
Hesperus wearing dazzle camouflage showing the angular bridge front that was fitted to Hero, Hereward, and the ex-Brazilian ships

These six ships were ordered by the Brazilian Navy, but on the outbreak of World War II, they were requisitioned by the Royal Navy. They are usually included with the H class.

Construction data
Ship	Builder	Laid down	Launched	Completed	Fate
Harvester (ex-Handy, ex-Jurua)	Vickers Armstrongs, Barrow	3 June 1938	29 September 1939	23 May 1940	Sunk by the German submarine U-432, 11 March 1943
Havant (ex-Javary)	J. Samuel White, Cowes	30 March 1938	17 July 1939	19 December 1939	Crippled by German aircraft and scuttled, 1 June 1940
Havelock (ex-Jutahy)	J. Samuel White, Cowes	31 May 1938	16 October 1939	10 February 1940	Scrapped, 31 October 1946
Hesperus (ex-Hearty, ex-Juruena)	John I. Thornycroft & Company, Woolston	6 July 1938	1 August 1939	22 January 1940	Scrapped, 15 May 1947
Highlander (ex-Jaguaribe)	John I. Thornycroft & Company, Woolston	28 September 1938	19 October 1939	18 March 1940	Scrapped, 27 May 1946
Hurricane (ex-Japura)	Vickers Armstrongs, Barrow	3 June 1938	29 September 1939	21 June 1940	Crippled by the German submarine U-415, 24 December 1943, and scuttled 25 December 1943

=== Argentine Navy ===
Seven ships were built for the Argentine Navy as the Buenos Aires class, they were delivered in 1938. They were built by Vickers Armstrongs (Barrow), Cammell Laird and John Brown & Company (Clydebank). One ship was lost after a collision in 1941, but the remaining ships were in service until broken up in the early 1970s.

=== Brazilian Navy ===
Brazil ordered six Jurua-class ships from Britain in 1938. These ships were purchased by Britain on the outbreak of war in 1939 and are described above. The Brazilians decided to produce indigenous destroyers, the Acre class, at the Ilha das Cobras shipyard, Rio de Janeiro. The design was based on the H-class plans supplied by Britain, but with guns and machinery supplied by the United States. Although laid down in 1940, the ships were not completed until 1949–1951.

=== Royal Hellenic Navy ===
Two ships, modified versions of the G class, were built for the Greek Royal Hellenic Navy (RHN) by Yarrow in the late 1930s. The ships were fitted with German-made 127-millimetre (5 in) guns and 37-millimetre (1.5 in) AA guns. The number of torpedo tubes was reduced by two on these ships to compensate for the additional topweight. The installation of the armament was carried out in Greece as the Germans refused to ship the weapons to Britain. Vasilefs Georgios, named after King George I, served with the RHN during the Greco-Italian War. Damaged by German aircraft, the ship managed to reach the Salamis Navy Yard and was put in dry dock for repairs, where after further damage during German air attacks, she was finally scuttled to prevent capture. The Germans raised and repaired her and she was commissioned into the Kriegsmarine as Hermes (ZG3) on 21 March 1942. Hermes was heavily damaged off Cape Bon, Tunisia, on 30 April 1943 and scuttled on 7 May 1943. Vasilissa Olga, named after Queen Olga, served with the RHN during the Greco-Italian War. Along with other ships, she escaped to Alexandria in May 1941 and joined the Allied forces. She was lost to German aircraft while anchored in Lakki Bay, Leros, on 26 September 1943.

== Service ==
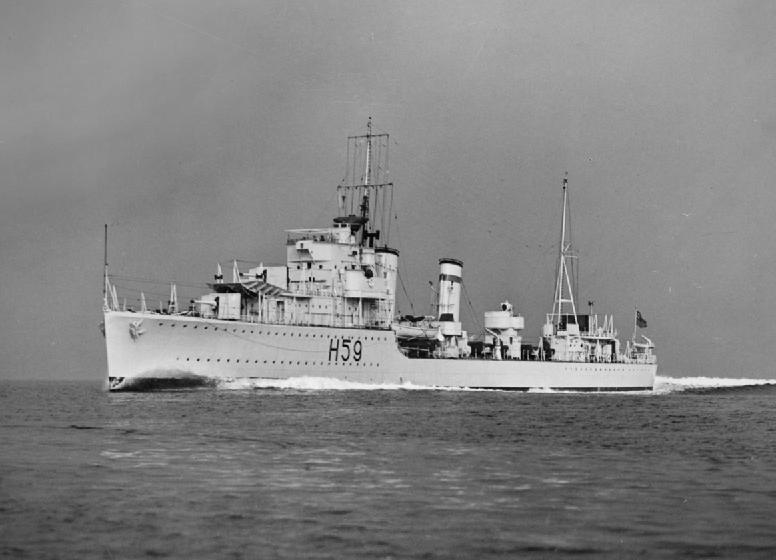
Gallant at sea, 28 April 1938

Grenville and the G class spent the bulk of their time before the start of World War II assigned to the 1st Destroyer Flotilla (DF) in the Mediterranean Fleet, where they made a number of neutrality patrols during the Spanish Civil War of 1936–1939. With the exception of Garland which was under repair at Malta after a premature explosion of her depth charges, they returned home in October–November after it became clear that the Italians would not enter the war. Hardy and the H-class ships were assigned to the 2nd Destroyer Flotilla and joined the Gs in the Mediterranean after commissioning for similar duties.

After a few weeks assigned to Western Approaches Command, the 1st DF was assigned to the Nore Command at Harwich, although some of the ships were transferred to the 22nd Destroyer Flotilla, where they were tasked for escort and patrol duty. Gipsy was sunk on 21 November after she struck a mine, as did Grenville on 19 January 1940. Unlike the 1st DF, the Second was transferred to Force K in Freetown in West Africa, to help search for German commerce raiders. Some ships were later transferred to Bermuda and the West Indies for escort work and patrolling. They returned to the UK in January and spent several months refitting.

After commissioning, Handy and Hearty were renamed Harvester and Hesperus, respectively, to avoid confusion with Hardy. The Havant-class destroyers initially formed the 9th Destroyer Flotilla assigned to Western Approaches Command for anti-submarine patrols and escort duty. The German invasion of Norway caused Havant, Hesperus, and Havelock to be detached to reinforce the Home Fleet during the Norwegian Campaign.

Garland, Grafton, Gallant, Hasty and Hereward were either under repair or refitting during the early stages of the Norwegian Campaign and did not participate in the Battles of Narvik in April. The remaining ships were assigned to the Home Fleet by this time. Glowworm was separated from the battlecruiser Renown in a heavy storm on 8 April and encountered the German heavy cruiser Admiral Hipper and several destroyers. The British destroyer could not disengage and was sunk after ramming Admiral Hipper. Hardy, Havock, Hostile, Hotspur and Hunter participated in the First Battle of Narvik on 10 April. They sank two German destroyers in exchange for the loss of Hardy and Hunter, while Hotspur was badly damaged. That same day, Hero sank the German submarine U-50 off the Norwegian coast and was the only G- or H-class destroyer to participate in the Second Battle of Narvik three days later. Griffin and Hasty helped to cover the evacuation of Allied troops from Namsos and Åndalsnes at the end of the month. Havelock escorted the transports conducting the evacuation of Narvik in June. Garland was loaned to the Polish Navy in May after her repairs were finished and she remained in the Mediterranean, escorting convoys between Malta and Alexandria, Egypt, until she was transferred to the Western Approaches Command in September.

In mid-May, the 2nd DF was transferred to the Mediterranean with Hostile, Hyperion, Hero, Hereward, Havock, and Hasty assigned. Later that month, many of the remaining G and Havant-class ships participated in Operation Dynamo. Grafton was torpedoed by U-62 on 29 May whilst rescuing survivors from the torpedoed destroyer Wakeful and had to be scuttled by the destroyer Ivanhoe. Later that day, Grenade blew up after being set on fire by German bombs; three days later, on 1 June, Havant was scuttled after being attacked by German bombers. Gallant and Greyhound were damaged while evacuating troops from Dunkirk. Harvester helped to evacuate more troops from Saint-Valery-en-Caux in Operation Cycle and, together with Griffin, Highlander, and Havelock, she participated in Operation Aerial, the evacuation of Allied troops from Saint-Nazaire and St. Jean de Luz.

Most of the ships of the 2nd DF participated in the inconclusive Battle of Calabria on 7–8 July. Almost two weeks later, Hasty, Hero, Hyperion and Havock were escorting the Australian light cruiser Sydney when they encountered two Italian light cruisers, sinking one of them in the Battle of Cape Spada. The ships escorted convoys and the ships of the Mediterranean Fleet for the rest of the year, although Hostile was sunk when she struck an Italian mine on 23 August and Hyperion was sunk by the Italian submarine Serpente on 22 December. Hotspur was assigned to the 13th Destroyer Flotilla, supporting Force H at Gibraltar in July; she was joined by Gallant, Greyhound, and Griffin shortly afterwards. The latter two ships escorted Force H during the Battle of Dakar in September against the Vichy French forces there. Havock and Hasty sank the Italian submarine Berillo on 2 October off the coast of Cyrenica while Gallant, Griffin and Hotspur sank the Italian submarine Lafolè on 18 October. Gallant, Greyhound, Griffin, now assigned to the 14th Destroyer Flotilla of the Mediterranean Fleet, together with Hero and Hereward, participated in the inconclusive Battle of Cape Spartivento on 27 November.

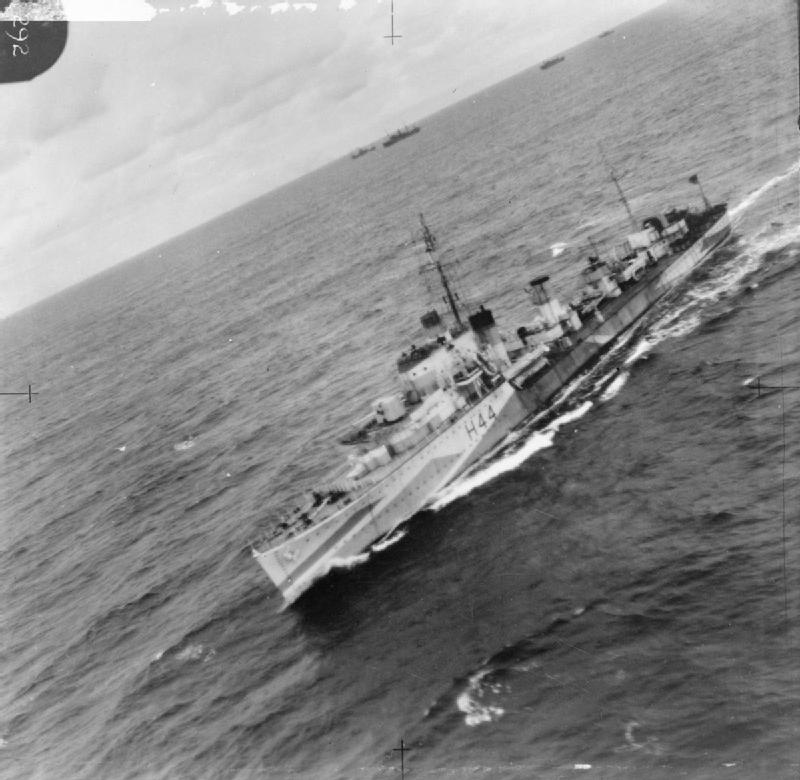
Aerial view of Highlander at sea, 31 May 1942

The 9th DF returned to the Western Approaches Command (WAC) from July to September, before they were briefly transferred to Portsmouth Command for several weeks, in response to the possible invasion (Operation Sea Lion). They returned to the WAC before the end of the month and Harvester and Highlander sank U-32 on 30 October. In November 1940, the 9th DF was re-designated as the 9th Escort Group. The Havants remained on escort duty until they began lengthy refits during 1941.

Gallant, Greyhound and Griffin were covering a convoy to Malta on 10 January when the former struck a mine that blew off her bow. Griffin rescued her crew and the ship was towed to Malta. Repairs were estimated to take until June 1942, but she was declared a constructive total loss and stripped of equipment after she had to be beached during an aerial attack on 5 April 1942. On 19 January, Greyhound sank the Italian submarine Neghelli after the latter torpedoed one of the ships in the convoy that Greyhound was escorting. Two months later, she sank the Italian submarine Anfitre on 6 March. Greyhound, Griffin, Hotspur, Hasty, Havock and Hereward participated in the Battle of Cape Matapan on 27–28 March. Greyhound was sunk by German dive bombers two months later, on 22 May, off Crete; Hereward suffered a similar fate a week later. Hotspur, Havock, Hero, and Hasty also participated in the evacuations of Greece and Crete in May. The latter three ships then supported Allied forces during the Syria–Lebanon Campaign in June. All four of the H-class ships, joined by Griffin, began escorting convoys from Alexandria to Tobruk in July, as well as occasional convoys to Malta, and continued to do so for most of the rest of the year. Hasty and Hotspur sank U-79 on 23 December while returning from Tobruk.

Garland and the five surviving Havants spent most of the year on convoy escort duties in the Atlantic aside from brief diversions such as Operation Tiger, a Mediterranean convoy in May that Harvester, Havelock, and Hesperus escorted, and Garland's participation in the Spitzbergen Raid in July. Hurricane was badly damaged by a German bomb in May that took the rest of the year to repair.

Hesperus was transferred to Force H in December 1941 for anti-submarine defence of the Strait of Gibraltar and sank U-93 by ramming on 15 January 1942. In March 1942, the Havant-class destroyers were designated group leaders of the Mid-Ocean Escort Force through the winter of 1942–1943. Garland was assigned to the escort force for Convoy PQ 16 to Murmansk in May, during which she was damaged by a German bomber. After repairs, she rejoined her half-sisters in the North Atlantic. On 26 December, Hesperus sank U-357 by ramming.

Griffin and Hotspur were transferred to the Eastern Fleet in February 1942. Havock, Hasty, and Hero participated in the Second Battle of Sirte on 22 March during which the former was damaged. While under repair at Malta, she was further damaged and was then ordered to Gibraltar for repairs in a safer environment. Whilst in transit, she ran aground off the Tunisian coast during the night of 5/6 April due to a navigational error and had to be destroyed to prevent her capture. Together with the destroyers Eridge and Hurworth, Hero sank U-568 on 28 May. To reinforce the escorts for Operation Vigorous, a convoy from Alexandria to Malta in June, Griffin and Hotspur were temporarily recalled to join their sisters. During the mission, Hasty was torpedoed by a German E-boat and had to be scuttled by Hotspur on 15 June. On 30 October, Hero shared the credit for sinking U-559 with five other destroyers and a Vickers Wellesley bomber of No. 42 Squadron RAF. Griffin arrived home that same month to begin her conversion into an escort destroyer. Garland remained in the North Atlantic until December 1943 when she began escorting convoys between Freetown and Gibraltar.

Hotspur and Hero were sent home and converted into escort destroyers in early 1943. Griffin and Hero were transferred to the Royal Canadian Navy in March and November 1943 and renamed Ottawa and Chaudière, respectively. Hotspur began escort duties in the WAC after her conversion was completed that lasted until October 1944. While escorting Convoy HX 228, Harvester rammed U-444 on 10 March, but was disabled in the process, so the French corvette Aconit finished off the submarine. The following day, Harvester was sunk by U-432 which was in turn sunk by Aconit. Hesperus sank U-191 on 23 April and U-186 on 12 May. Hesperus continued to escort convoys in the North Atlantic until January 1945 when she was transferred to the UK. Highlander and Hurricane also remained on convoy duties, although the latter ship was torpedoed by U-415 on 24 December and had to be scuttled by Watchman the next day.

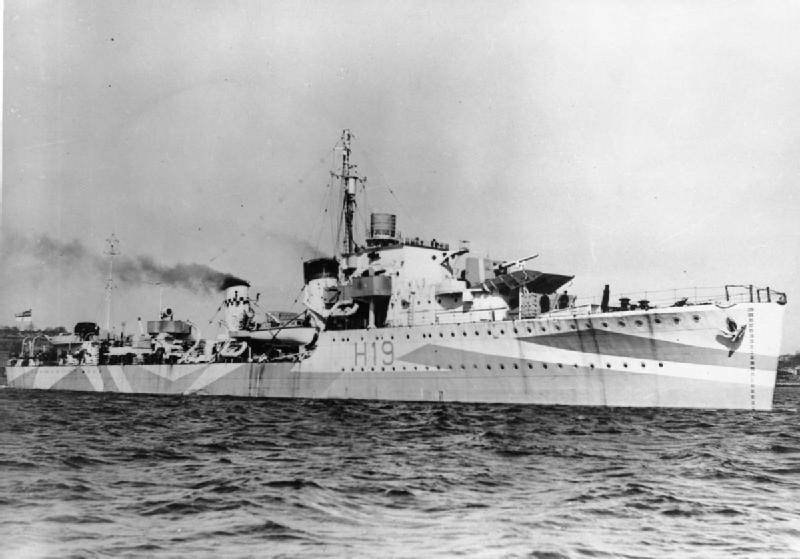
Harvester in 1942, with a Hedgehog in lieu of 'A' gun and a Type 271 radar above the bridge

Garland was transferred to the Mediterranean in April 1944 and sank U-407 on 19 September. She began a lengthy refit in November and had barely finished working up when the war ended. Havelock, Ottawa and Chaudière were escorting convoys in the North Atlantic until they were transferred to the UK in preparation for Operation Overlord in May 1944. Chaudière and the escorts of Convoy HX 280 sank U-744 on 6 March. Ottawa sank three German submarines in 1944, U-678 with the corvette Statice on 6 July, U-621 with Chaudière on 16 August and U-984, also with Chaudière, two days later.

Ottawa, Chaudière and Hotspur also had lengthy overhauls that began in late 1944; the latter's was completed in March 1945 and she then patrolled the Irish Sea until the end of the war while Ottawa returned to the North Atlantic when her refit was finished in February. Chaudière's, however, was still not completed by the end of the war. Highlander struck a small iceberg on 15 April that crushed the underwater portion of her bow and was under repair for the next three months. Havelock and Hesperus, assisted by aircraft from No. 201 Squadron RAF, sank U-242 in the Irish Channel on 30 April.

=== Postwar ===
The surviving ships were essentially obsolete and worn-out when the war ended in May. Ottawa made several voyages ferrying Canadian troops back home before she was paid off in October. The ship was sold for scrap in 1946, but was not actually broken up until 1950. Chaudière was in the worst shape of any of the Canadian destroyers and was paid off in August, although she was not scrapped until 1950 like her sister. Garland transported food and other supplies to Dutch and Belgian towns immediately after the end of the war and was part of the Home Fleet until she was reduced to reserve in August 1946. She was purchased by the Royal Netherlands Navy in November 1947, renamed Marnix, and became a training ship until 1964. Hotspur remained in service until 1948 when she was sold to the Dominican Republic and renamed Trujillo. Renamed Duarte in 1962, the ship was sold for scrap in 1972. Havelock and Hesperus escorted the Norwegian government-in-exile back to Norway in May and then served as a target ship before being broken up in late 1946 and 1947, respectively. Like her sisters, Highlander served as a target ship after her repairs were completed and was scrapped beginning in May 1947.
