= Convoy HX 228 =

Convoy during naval battles of the Second World War

- Part of World War II
Date	10–11 March 1943
Location	North Atlantic
Result	Inconclusive

Belligerents
(Nazi Germany) Germany	Free France; United Kingdom; Poland

Commanders and leaders
Admiral Karl Dönitz	Comm: JO Dunn; B-3 Group: AA Tait †

Strength
9 U-boats	60 ships 8 escorts

Casualties and losses
2 U-boats	4 ships (24,175 GRT); 1 warship

HX 228 was a North Atlantic convoy of the HX series which ran during the Battle of the Atlantic in World War II. It was one of a series of four convoy battles that occurred during the crisis month of March 1943 and is notable for the loss of the Escort Group leader Commander AA "Harry" Tait.

== Prelude ==
HX 228 was an east-bound convoy of 60 ships, plus local contingents, which sailed from New York on 28 February 1943 bound for Liverpool and carrying war materials.

The Mid-Ocean Escort Force group B3 joined the convoy from St Johns. The escort group was led by Commander AA Tait of HMS Harvester; the other ships of this group were the destroyers HMS Escapade, ORP Burza and ORP Garland and the corvettes HMS Narcissus and FNFL ships Aconit, Renoncule and Roselys. The group was backed by the escort carrier USS Bogue and two destroyers which sailed from Argentia on 5 March.

Arrayed against them in the North Atlantic were three U-boat patrol lines, Wildfang, Burggraf and Neuland, although in the event, only a re-configured Neuland, comprising 13 U-boats, engaged HX 228.

In early March, the U-boat rakes came into contact with Convoy SC 121, which was several days ahead of HX 228, and engaged it. The Admiralty diverted HX 228 north-east to avoid the conflict and thus straight into the Neuland patrol area.

== Action ==
On 10 March, the first contact was made by U-336 in heavy weather. During the rest of the day, eight others were directed to join. Ironically, at this point, the weather forced Bogue and her group to detach, as it was impossible to fly off aircraft in the storm. She sailed for Argentia and took no part in the action.

On the evening of 10/11 March, during a snow squall, the first attacks took place.

U-221 attacked three ships, sinking two ammunition ships, Tucurinca and Andrea F. Luckenbach, and damaging a third, SS Lawton B. Evans. U-221 was vigorously counterattacked and withdrew to repair the damage.

U-444 and U-757 both fired on William C Gorgas, which dropped back and sank later.

U-757 also fired on Brant County, which was also carrying ammunition. Brant County caught fire and exploded, and U-757 was damaged as a result. U-757 was forced to return to base and was later attacked in the company of two other U-boats in the Bay of Biscay by the RAF, but all survived.

U-86 and U-406 both claimed hits using the new pattern-running FAT torpedoes. Jamaica Provider was damaged during this stage.

During the morning of 11 March, Harvester sighted U-444 on the surface and ran in to attack. She opened with gunfire and then rammed U-444, suffering damage to her propellers in the process. It was originally thought that Harvester had sunk U-444, but she was found later on the surface and finished off by French corvette Aconit. While in the area, Harvester found and picked up 50 survivors from William Gorgas and 1 from U-444. While attempting to re-join the convoy, her engines failed, and she summoned Aconit for assistance. While Harvester lay helpless, she was sighted and torpedoed by U-432; she sank with 149 onboard, including Commander Tait.

Arriving on the scene, Aconit gained Asdic contact on U-432 which was lying motionless at periscope depth, her commander and crew celebrating their victory. Aconit attacked with depth charges, blowing her to the surface and sinking her later with gunfire.

Aconit picked up 20 survivors from U-432, 48 from Harvester, 12 from William C Gorgas, and one from U-444, to join the three previously picked up.

Despite further action that day and during the night of 11/12 March, there were no further losses to either side and on 12 March Admiral Karl Dönitz, the Befehlshaber der U-Boote (Commander in chief of U-boats), called off the attack.

HX 228 arrived safely at Liverpool on 15 March 1943.

== Conclusion ==
HX 228 cannot be seen as a victory for either side. The convoy had lost four ships and a warship, with the loss also of Commander Tait, an effective and well-respected Escort Group commander. The Neuland wolf pack had lost two boats, a potentially ruinous rate of exchange.

== In popular culture ==
An attack by U-boats of fictional Convoys "HX 229", "HX 229A" and "SC112" is a key plot element in the 1995 novel Enigma by Robert Harris, and the 2001 film of the same name adapted from the novel.

== Tables ==
Allied merchant ships sunk

Date	Name	Nationality	Casualties	Tonnage	Sunk by...
10 March 1943	Tucurinca	United Kingdom	1	5,412	U-221
10 March 1943	Andrea F Luckenbach	United States	21	6,565	U-221
11 March 1943	Brant County	Norway	6	5,001	U-757
11 March 1943	William C Gorgas	United States	?55	7,197	U-444, U-757

Allied warships sunk

Date	Name	Nationality	Casualties	Type	Sunk by...
11 March 1943	HMS Harvester (H19)	Royal Navy	149	H-Class Destroyer	U-432

U-boats destroyed

Date	Number	Type	Location	Casualties	Sunk by...
11 March 1943	U-444	VIIC	North Atlantic; 51°14′N 29°18′W	41	depth-charged & rammed by Harvester, Aconit
11 March 1943	U-432	VIIC	North Atlantic; 51°35′N 28°20′W	20	depth-charged, gunfire by Aconit
