= K74 =

K74 may refer to:

- HMS Narcissus (K74), a Flower-class corvette in the Royal Navy during the Second World War
- USN airship K-74, lost to German submarine U-134 (1941) in 1943
- K-74 (Kansas highway), a state highway in Kansas
