= HMS Narcissus (K74) =

Flower-class corvette

History

United Kingdom
- Name: HMS Narcissus
- Builder: J. Lewis & Sons Ltd
- Laid down: 9 September 1940
- Launched: 29 March 1941
- Commissioned: 17 July 1941
- Identification: Pennant number: K74
- Fate: Sold April 1946 as mercantile Este, wrecked 27 June 1969

General characteristics
- Class & type: Flower-class corvette

HMS Narcissus was a Flower-class corvette which served in the Royal Navy during the Second World War from 1941 to the end of the war in 1945. She primarily escorted convoys across the Atlantic Ocean.

== Construction and armament ==
Narcissus was constructed at Lewis’s shipyard in Aberdeen in April 1941, with the express purpose of joining the Battle of the Atlantic as a convoy escort. She was to act as a platform, from which attacking German submarines could be detected above or below the surface anytime, and driven away or destroyed. She was equipped with sonar and, eventually, type-271 radar and armed with depth charge rails and throwers. A forward throwing Hedgehog was added at a later date.

== War service ==
After her crew had been worked up at the training base at Tobermory in August 1941, she joined the Clyde Escort Force at Greenock on the River Clyde. Apart from three annual refits and a rearmament at Govan, Fort William and Troon, she escorted merchant ships continuously for three years. Narcissus went across the North Atlantic to Newfoundland; across the Bay of Biscay to Gibraltar; and once to Freetown and back.

During the course of these convoys, she expended countless depth charges against under-water contacts and picked up survivors from several Allied ships. In March 1943, she took part in the rescue of survivors of the destroyer HMS Harvester, which had been torpedoed and sunk by U-432 during the passage of convoy HX 228. In September 1943, she narrowly missed being torpedoed by U-260 and witnessed the sinking of her consort, HMS Itchen, by U-666.

On 6 June 1944 (D-day), she escorted the follow-up wave of the invasion of Normandy, of the 3rd Canadian Division in Landing Ships and Landing Craft (Infantry) to Juno Beach and the 51st Highland Division to Gold Beach respectively. After the first frantic months of re-supply convoy duties across the English Channel, she acted as a local escort for the South-western Approaches.

== Post-war ==
When the Second World War ended, she was ordered to Milford Haven to de-ammunition and be laid up in reserve.
