= April 2009 raid off Somalia =

Military operation conducted by France and Germany

- Part of Piracy in Somalia, Operation Atalanta
Date	9 April 2009
Location	20 miles (32 km) off Somalia
Result	Franco-German victory

Belligerents
France; Germany	Somali pirates

Commanders and leaders
Guillaume Goutay	Unknown

Strength
France: 3 frigates 70 marine commandos 1 C-130 Hercules; Germany: 1 frigate	1 yacht 5 pirates

Casualties and losses
None	1 yacht captured 2 killed 3 captured
- 1 civilian killed

The April 2009 raid off Somalia was a military operation conducted by France and Germany to retake the French yacht Tanit on 9 April 2009, a yacht which had been captured by Somali pirates on 4 April 2009. It occurred during Operation Atalanta, a European Union mission in Somali waters. The pirates had attempted to extract a ransom by holding the yacht's occupants hostage, but were ultimately defeated when the French Navy assaulted them.

== Background ==
Tanit, a privately owned French yacht named after the Phoenician lunar goddess, with its five crew and passengers was sailing to Zanzibar when it was boarded by pirates on 4 April. Among the hostages were a family of three including a three-year-old boy, and two friends of the family who joined them in Aden. The ship's owners, the Lemaçons, started from Vannes in July 2008 and sailed south to the coast of Spain. This was a family trip "to escape consumer society". They planned to visit Kenya and Zanzibar. Even after meeting with a couple whose yacht, Carré d'As IV, had been captured by pirates, and later rescued by French commandos, they continued on their journey.

The pirates headed the vessel for the coast but were overrun two days later by a French frigate. French forces attempted to negotiate with the pirates offering them money and offering to exchange the mother and child for a French naval officer. The pirates declined this. Instead, they were overheard discussing using explosives to blow up the yacht.

History
- Name: Tanit
- Captured: 4 April 2009
- Fate: Rescued, action of 9 April 2009

General characteristics
- Class & type: Colin Archer cutter
- Length: 12.5 m (41 ft)

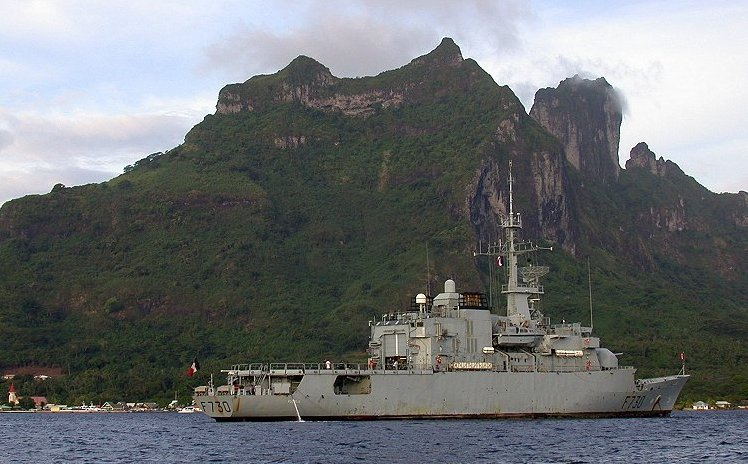
The French frigate Floréal

== Action ==
Fifty commandos were sent from France to a French base at Djibouti on 9 April, in readiness for the assault. Joined locally by 20 more commandos, they parachuted from a C-130 Hercules plane into the sea, to be picked up by three French warships that had been tracking the pirates, together with a German frigate equipped with hospital facilities.

The French attempted to negotiate with the pirates, and even offered to exchange one of the hostages for an officer. The pirates refused to cooperate, stating that they could get better terms once they reached the coast. Seeing the pirates were uncooperative a sniper on-board one of the vessels managed to shoot down the sails and to damage the mast and the yacht. This the French believed would put them in a better negotiating position, but it created havoc on board, causing the pirates to refuse to accede to any of the French demands.

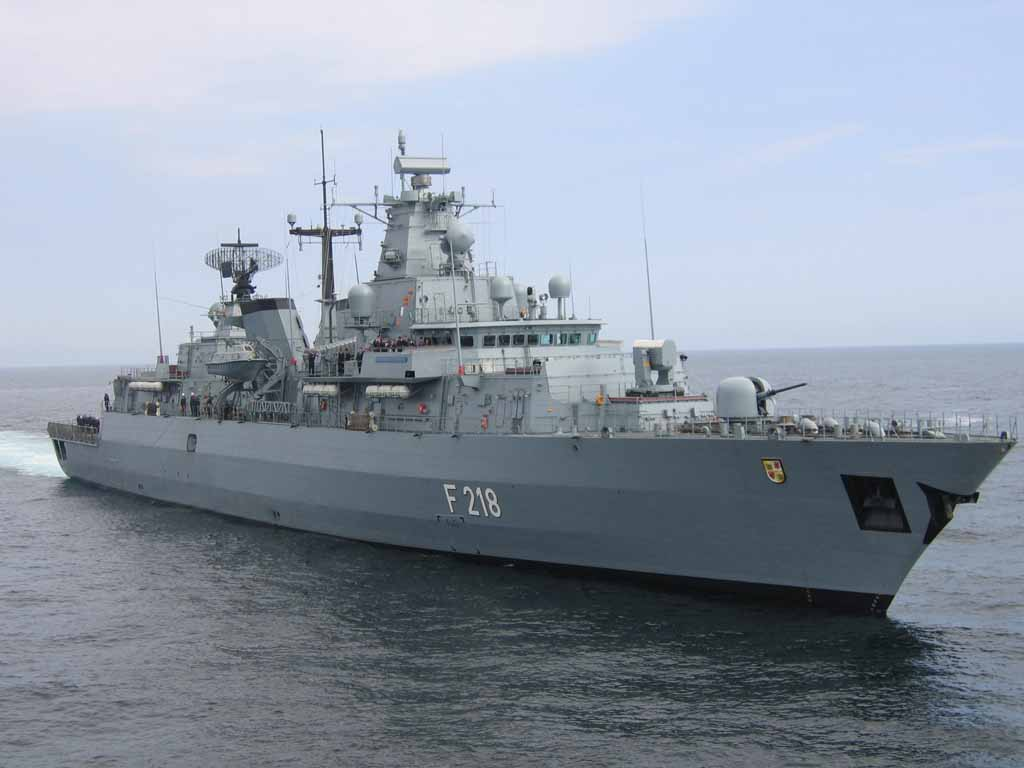
The German frigate Mecklenburg-Vorpommern

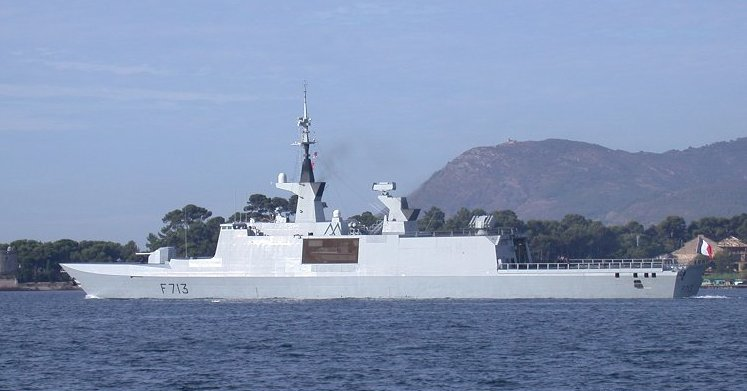
The French frigate Aconit

Allegedly, after threats to execute the hostages were heard, the French Navy decided the next day to board the boat and free the hostages. French commandos attacked the hijacked vessel from different directions in two speedboats. The pirates opened fire and the special forces team fired back. French naval commandos then boarded the vessel and rescued the hostages. However, Florent Lemaçon, the boat's captain and father of the three-year-old boy, was being held hostage in his cabin. When French commandos entered, they engaged in a shootout with the pirates, during which Lemaçon was killed.

== Aftermath ==
After the fighting ended the four freed hostages were taken in one of the frigates, to Djibouti, and from there transported back to France. Three pirates were taken to Rennes for questioning.

In total, 70 men of the French naval forces, including men of the French commando Hubert, French frigates Aconit, Floréal and the aviso Commandant Ducuing and German frigate Mecklenburg-Vorpommern participated in the operation.
