= SS Miraflores =

History

- Name: SS Miraflores
- Owner: Swan, Hunter & Wigham Richardson Ltd, Newcastle-upon-Tyne (1921-1925); Miraflores Steamship Co Ltd (Atlantic Fruit & Sugar Co), Kingston, Jamaica (1925-1931); Standard Fruit and Steamship Company (1931-1932); Marymira Company Ltd, Kingston (1932-1937); Llanrumney Ltd, Kingston (1938-1942)
- Builder: Swan, Hunter & Wigham Richardson Ltd, Wallsend
- Yard number: 1163
- Launched: 12 March 1921
- Completed: May 1921
- Fate: Sunk on 19 February 1942

General characteristics
- Tonnage: 2,158 gross register tons (GRT); 1,201 net register tons (NRT)
- Length: 270.7 ft (82.5 m)
- Beam: 39 ft (12 m)
- Depth: 14.7 ft (4.5 m)
- Propulsion: 1 x Screw

SS Miraflores was a freighter lost on 19 February 1942. The ship left New Orleans on 6 February 1942 with a crew of 34 and made an intermediate stop in Haiti before sailing for New York on 14 February 1942. Miraflores was owned by the Standard Fruit and Steamship Company. She had a gross tonnage of 2,158 and was 270 feet long. She was built in England in 1921 and was engaged in transporting bananas between Central America and New Orleans.

Miraflores was torpedoed and sunk in the Atlantic Ocean north east of Delaware Capes, United States by U-432 with the loss of all 34 crew. The ship was later discovered and identified in 2007.
