= HMS Highlander (H44) =

British H-class destroyer

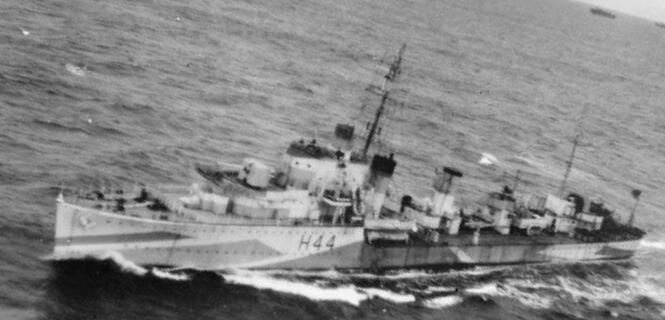
- Aerial view of Highlander

History

Brazil
- Name: Jaguaribe
- Ordered: 16 December 1937
- Builder: John I. Thornycroft & Company, Woolston
- Laid down: 28 September 1938
- Fate: Purchased by the United Kingdom, 5 September 1939

United Kingdom
- Name: HMS Highlander
- Launched: 19 October 1939
- Acquired: 5 September 1939
- Commissioned: 18 March 1940
- Identification: Pennant number: H44
- Fate: Sold for scrap, 27 May 1946

General characteristics (as built)
- Class & type: Brazilian H-class destroyer
- Displacement: 1,350 long tons (1,370 t) (standard); 1,883 long tons (1,913 t) (deep load)
- Length: 323 ft (98.5 m)
- Beam: 33 ft (10.1 m)
- Draught: 12 ft 5 in (3.8 m)
- Installed power: 34,000 shp (25,000 kW)
- Propulsion: 2 shafts; Parsons geared steam turbines; 3 Admiralty water-tube boilers
- Speed: 36 knots (67 km/h; 41 mph)
- Range: 5,530 nmi (10,240 km; 6,360 mi) at 15 knots (28 km/h; 17 mph)
- Complement: 152
- Sensors & processing systems: ASDIC
- Armament: 3 × 1 - QF 4.7-inch (120 mm) Mk IX guns; 2 × 4 - .50 cal machine guns; 2 × 4 - 21 inch (533 mm) torpedo tubes; 110 × depth charges, 3 rails and 8 throwers

HMS Highlander was an H-class destroyer that had originally been ordered by the Brazilian Navy with the name Jaguaribe in the late 1930s, but was bought by the Royal Navy after the beginning of World War II in September 1939 and later renamed. When completed in March 1940, she was assigned to the 9th Destroyer Flotilla of the Home Fleet. The ship was assigned to convoy escort duties in June with the Western Approaches Command, sinking one German submarine in October. Highlander was transferred to Freetown, Sierra Leone, in mid-1941 to escort convoys off West Africa, but returned to the United Kingdom in August. She became flotilla leader of Escort Group B-4 of the Mid-Ocean Escort Force in early 1942 and continued to escort convoys in the North Atlantic for the rest of the war. The ship became a target ship after the war ended and was sold for scrap in mid-1946.

== Description ==
Highlander displaced 1,350 long tons (1,370 t) at standard load and 1,883 long tons (1,913 t) at deep load. The ship had an overall length of 323 feet (98.5 m), a beam of 33 feet (10.1 m) and a draught of 12 feet 5 inches (3.8 m). She was powered by Parsons geared steam turbines, driving two shafts, which developed a total of 34,000 shaft horsepower (25,000 kW) and gave a maximum speed of 36 knots (67 km/h; 41 mph). Steam for the turbines was provided by three Admiralty 3-drum water-tube boilers. Highlander carried a maximum of 470 long tons (480 t) of fuel oil, giving her a range of 5,530 nautical miles (10,240 km; 6,360 mi) at 15 knots (28 km/h; 17 mph). The ship's complement was 152 officers and men.

The vessel was designed for four 45-calibre 4.7-inch Mk IX guns in single mounts, designated 'A', 'B', 'X', and 'Y' from front to rear, but 'Y' gun was removed to compensate for the additional depth charges added. For anti-aircraft (AA) defence, Highlander had two quadruple Mark I mounts for the 0.5 inch Vickers Mark III machine gun. She was fitted with two above-water quadruple torpedo tube mounts for 21-inch (533 mm) torpedoes. One depth charge rail and two throwers were originally fitted, but this was increased to three sets of rails and eight throwers while fitting-out. The ship's load of depth charges was increased from 20 to 110 as well.

Highlander was completed without a director-control tower (DCT) so the three remaining 4.7-inch low-angle guns fired in local control using ranges provided by a rangefinder. She was fitted with an ASDIC set to detect submarines by reflections from sound waves beamed into the water.

=== Wartime modifications ===
Little data on Highlander's modifications during the war has survived, although it is known that she had her rear torpedo tubes replaced by a 12-pounder AA gun in July 1940. The ship's short-range AA armament was later augmented by two Oerlikon 20 mm guns on the wings of the ship's bridge and the .50-calibre machine gun mounts were replaced by a pair of Oerlikons. It is uncertain if the ship's director-control tower was installed before a Type 271 target indication radar was installed above the bridge. At some point, the ship was converted to an escort destroyer. 'A' gun was replaced by a Hedgehog anti-submarine spigot mortar and additional depth charge stowage replaced the 12-pounder high-angle gun. A Type 286 short-range surface search radar was fitted as well as a HF/DF radio direction finder mounted on a pole mainmast.

== History ==
She was originally ordered as Jaguaribe on 16 December 1937 by the Brazilian Navy. The ship was laid down by John I. Thornycroft and Company at Woolston, Hampshire, on 28 September 1938 and was purchased by the British on 5 September 1939 after the beginning of World War II. Renamed HMS Highlander, she was launched on 16 October and commissioned on 18 March 1940. After working up at Portland Harbour, she was assigned to the 9th Destroyer Flotilla of the Home Fleet and began escort duty on 11 April. Six days later, the ship ran aground in the Shetland Islands and was moderately damaged. Re-floated, Highlander was repaired at Hull between 20 April and 19 May. She escorted the battlecruiser Renown to Scapa Flow and arrived there on 24 May. The flotilla was transferred to the Western Approaches Command in mid-June and Highlander rescued survivors of the torpedoed armed merchant cruiser Scotstoun, torpedoed and sunk by U-25, en route to Plymouth. Later in the month, the ship escorted ships evacuating Allied troops from French ports on the Atlantic coast (Operation Aerial).

Highlander then rejoined the 9th Destroyer Flotilla on convoy escort duties until January 1941. During this time, she was briefly refitted in mid-July with a 12-pounder AA gun, replacing her rear set of torpedo tubes and, together with her sister Harvester, the ship sank the German submarine U-32 on 30 October. On 1 December, she escorted the torpedoed Canadian destroyer HMCS Saguenay to Barrow-in-Furness for repairs. Highlander began a longer refit at Hawthorn Leslie's shipyard at Hebburn from 30 January to 23 March 1941. After its completion, the ship was briefly assigned to Force H at Gibraltar, before continuing on to Freetown to begin escort duties with the 18th Destroyer Flotilla there. She remained there until August when she was transferred to Londonderry where she was later assigned to the 28th Escort Group of Western Approaches Command.

Highlander was refitted and rearmed from 2 February–18 March 1942 at Tilbury. She became flotilla leader for Escort Group B4 and was assigned to the Mid-Ocean Escort Force when her refit was completed. The ship and her consorts escorted Convoy SC 122 through the largest convoy battle of the war in March 1943; Highlander was unsuccessfully attacked by U-441 and U-608 during the battle. The ship was given an extensive overhaul at Troon from 28 December–12 April 1944 that was lengthened when she was damaged in a collision with a tugboat. Upon its completion, she rejoined her group and remained with them until September when she was transferred to Escort Group B2 and became its flotilla leader. Highlander crushed her bow on 15 April 1945 when she struck some ice; she had to be towed to Bay Bulls, Newfoundland, for temporary repairs. She received permanent repairs at nearby St. John's from 17 April to 24 July. The ship reached Portsmouth five days later and later sailed to Rosyth for service as a target ship for aircraft. Highlander was placed in Category C reserve on 19 January 1946 and was approved for scrapping on 19 February 1946. She was sold on 27 May, but demolition did not begin until May 1947.
