= French frigate Aconit (F 713) =

1997 La Fayette-class frigate

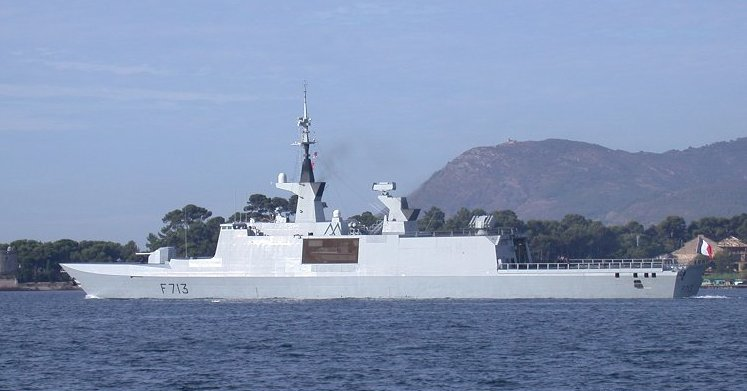

History

France
- Name: Aconit
- Namesake: French corvette Aconit
- Laid down: 5 August 1996
- Launched: 8 June 1997
- Commissioned: 6 June 1999
- Renamed: laid down as Jauréguiberry, renamed Aconit in 1996
- Home port: Toulon
- Identification: Pennant number F 713
- Honours and awards: Flies the FFL jack in honour of the corvette Aconit; Fourragère of the Ordre de la Libération; Fourragère of the Croix de Guerre
- Status: In active service

General characteristics
- Class & type: La Fayette-class frigate
- Displacement: 3,680 t (3,620 long tons) fully loaded (post-refit)
- Length: 125 m (410 ft 1 in)
- Beam: 15.4 m (50 ft 6 in)
- Draught: 4.8 m (15 ft 9 in)
- Propulsion: 4 × SEMT Pielstick 12PA6V280 STC2 diesel engines; 16,000 kW (21,000 hp)
- Speed: 25 knots (46 km/h; 29 mph)
- Range: 7,000 nmi (13,000 km; 8,100 mi) at 15 knots (28 km/h; 17 mph)
- Complement: 170+; around 6 additional personnel to be embarked on Aconit post-upgrade
- Sensors & processing systems: 1 × Air/Surface DRBV 15C sentry radar; 1 x SENIT FLF combat management system (replaced previous Thales TAVITAC CMS during 2023 refit); 1 × firing control radar for the 100 mm gun; 1 × DRBN34 navigation radar; 1 × DRBN34 landing radar; 1 x KingKlip Mk 2 hull-mounted sonar (fit during 2023 refit)
- Electronic warfare & decoys: 1 × Saïgon ARBG 1 radio interceptor; 1 × ARBR 21 radar interceptor; 2 × Dagaie Mk2 chaff launcher; 1 × AN/SLQ-25 Nixie tugged noise maker; 1 × Prairie-Masker noise reduction system; 1 × Syracuse II; 1 × Inmarsat; CANTO anti-torpedo countermeasures (fit during 2023 refit)
- Armament: Anti-ship; 8 × Exocet MM40 Block 3 anti-ship missiles (upgraded to Block 3c capacity from previous Block 2 capability during 2023 refit); Guns; 1 × 100 mm TR automatic gun; 2 × 20 mm modèle F2 guns; CIWS; 2 x 6 Sadral launchers with Mistral Mk 3 SAM/SSM (replaced previous Crotale SAM during 2023 refit)
- Armour: On sensitive areas (munition magazine and control centre)
- Aircraft carried: 1 × helicopter (Panther or NH90)

Aconit is a general purpose stealth frigate of the French Navy. Initially to be named Jauréguiberry, she is now the fourth French vessel named after the FNFL corvette Aconit.

== Service history ==
She took part in the action of 9 April 2009.

Based in Toulon, the frigate was reported active in the Mediterranean as of 2021, taking part in the Mare Aperto exercises with the Italian Navy in October.

In September 2022, the frigate deployed to the Indian Ocean participating in exercises with the Egyptian Navy en route. From November 25 to December 8, the frigate was engaged in joint "Pearl of the West" exercises between French forces based in the United Arab Emirates and the Kuwaiti Armed Forces. The frigate returned to her base at Toulon on 22 December 2022.

== Upgrade ==
Aconit began a major life extension upgrade in February 2023. The upgrade is designed to permit the frigate to operate through the 2020s and into the 2030s and incorporates the addition of hull-mounted sonar, improved point air defence systems, the CANTO anti-torpedo countermeasures system, as well as the capacity to deploy the latest variant of the Exocet anti-ship missile. The ship was in dry dock until July and was then relaunched. She is returned to sea in October and is projected to be fully operational again in early 2024, remaining active until 2034.

== Gallery ==
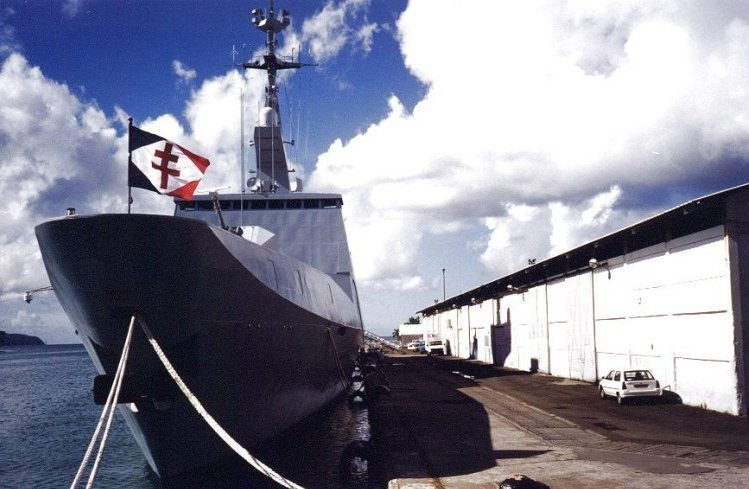

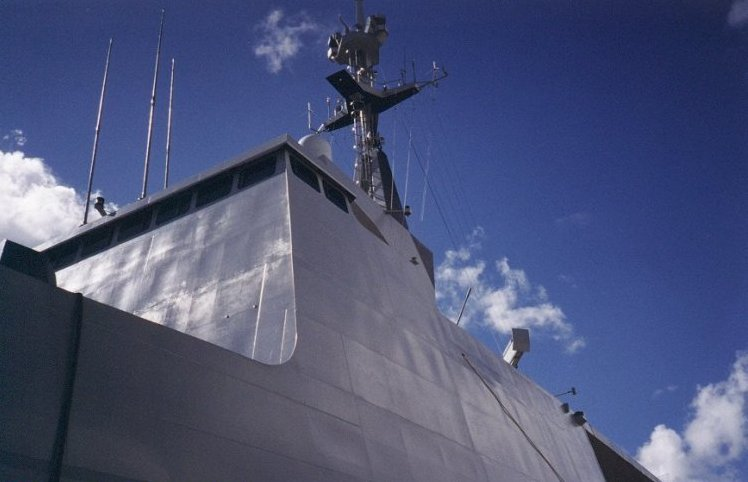

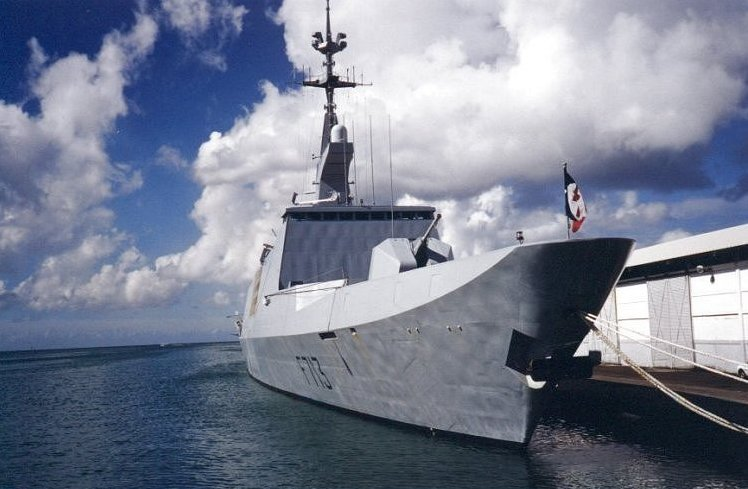

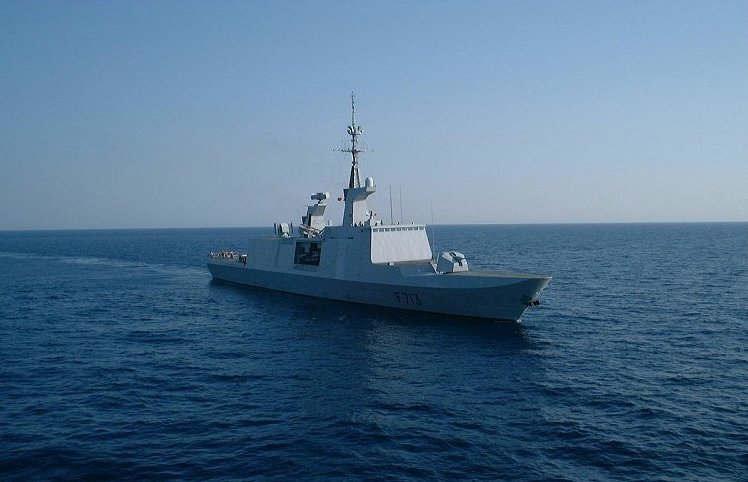

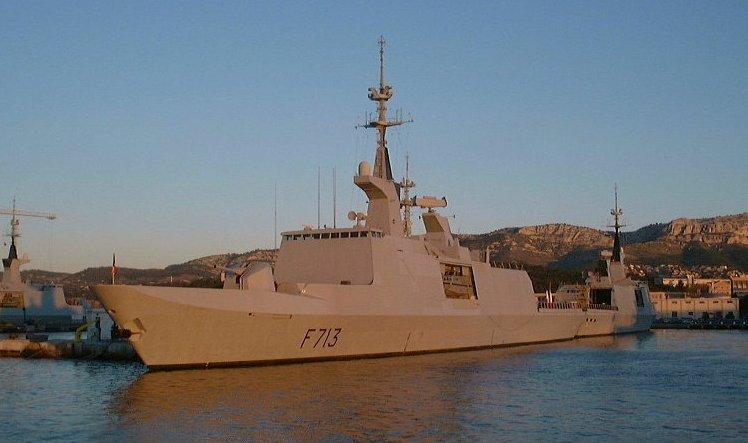

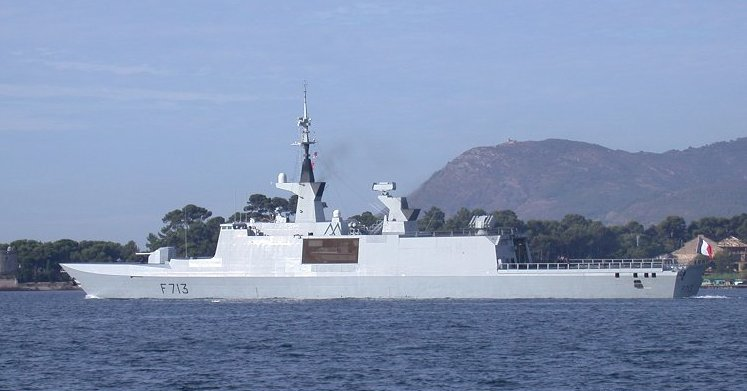
