= German submarine U-757 =

German World War II submarine

History

Nazi Germany
- Name: U-757
- Ordered: 9 October 1939
- Builder: Kriegsmarinewerft Wilhelmshaven
- Yard number: 140
- Laid down: 18 May 1940
- Launched: 14 December 1941
- Commissioned: 28 February 1942
- Fate: Sunk on 8 January 1944

General characteristics
- Class & type: Type VIIC submarine
- Displacement: 769 tonnes (757 long tons) surfaced; 871 t (857 long tons) submerged
- Length: 67.10 m (220 ft 2 in) o/a; 50.50 m (165 ft 8 in) pressure hull
- Beam: 6.20 m (20 ft 4 in) o/a; 4.70 m (15 ft 5 in) pressure hull
- Height: 9.60 m (31 ft 6 in)
- Draught: 4.74 m (15 ft 7 in)
- Installed power: 2,800–3,200 PS (2,100–2,400 kW; 2,800–3,200 bhp) (diesels); 750 PS (550 kW; 740 shp) (electric)
- Propulsion: 2 shafts; 2 × diesel engines; 2 × electric motors
- Speed: 17.7 knots (32.8 km/h; 20.4 mph) surfaced; 7.6 knots (14.1 km/h; 8.7 mph) submerged
- Range: 8,500 nmi (15,700 km; 9,800 mi) at 10 knots (19 km/h; 12 mph) surfaced; 80 nmi (150 km; 92 mi) at 4 knots (7.4 km/h; 4.6 mph) submerged
- Test depth: 230 m (750 ft); Crush depth: 250–295 m (820–968 ft)
- Complement: 4officers, 40–56 enlisted
- Armament: 5 × 53.3 cm (21 in) torpedo tubes (four bow, one stern); 14 × torpedoes; 1 × 8.8 cm (3.46 in) deck gun (220 rounds); 1 x 2 cm (0.79 in) C/30 AA gun

Service record
- Part of: 6th U-boat Flotilla; 28 February 1942 – 8 January 1944
- Identification codes: M 39 567
- Commanders: Oblt.z.S. / K.Kapt. Friedrich Deetz; 28 February 1942 – 8 January 1944
- Operations: 5 patrols: 1st patrol: 26 September – 24 October 1942; 2nd patrol: 12 – 25 December 1942; 3rd patrol: 22 February – 18 March 1943; 4th patrol: 7 July – 4 September 1943; 5th patrol: a. 31 October – 2 November 1943; b. 16 – 18 November 1943; c. 20 – 22 November 1943; d. 29 November – 1 December 1943; e. 29 December 1943 – 8 January 1944
- Victories: 2 merchant ships sunk (11,313 GRT); 1 warship sunk (291 tons)

German submarine U-757 was a Type VIIC U-boat built for Nazi Germany's Kriegsmarine for service during World War II. Laid down as yard number 140 at the Kriegsmarinewerft (KMW) in Wilhelmshaven, U-757 served with 6th U-boat Flotilla from 28 February 1942 until 8 January 1944 under the command of Korvettenkapitän Friedrich Deetz.

== Design ==
German Type VIIC submarines were preceded by the shorter Type VIIB submarines. U-757 had a displacement of 769 tonnes (757 long tons) when at the surface and 871 tonnes (857 long tons) while submerged. She had a total length of 67.10 m (220 ft 2 in), a pressure hull length of 50.50 m (165 ft 8 in), a beam of 6.20 m (20 ft 4 in), a height of 9.60 m (31 ft 6 in), and a draught of 4.74 m (15 ft 7 in). The submarine was powered by two Germaniawerft F46 four-stroke, six-cylinder supercharged diesel engines producing a total of 2,800 to 3,200 metric horsepower (2,060 to 2,350 kW; 2,760 to 3,160 shp) for use while surfaced, two Garbe, Lahmeyer & Co. RP 137/c double-acting electric motors producing a total of 750 metric horsepower (550 kW; 740 shp) for use while submerged. She had two shafts and two 1.23 m (4 ft) propellers. The boat was capable of operating at depths of up to 230 metres (750 ft).

The submarine had a maximum surface speed of 17.7 knots (32.8 km/h; 20.4 mph) and a maximum submerged speed of 7.6 knots (14.1 km/h; 8.7 mph). When submerged, the boat could operate for 80 nautical miles (150 km; 92 mi) at 4 knots (7.4 km/h; 4.6 mph); when surfaced, she could travel 8,500 nautical miles (15,700 km; 9,800 mi) at 10 knots (19 km/h; 12 mph). U-757 was fitted with five 53.3 cm (21 in) torpedo tubes (four fitted at the bow and one at the stern), fourteen torpedoes, one 8.8 cm (3.46 in) SK C/35 naval gun, 220 rounds, and a 2 cm (0.79 in) C/30 anti-aircraft gun. The boat had a complement of between forty-four and sixty.

== Service history ==
U-757's first victims were the British transport vessel HMS LCT-2398 - destroying 291 tons of shipping - in the convoy HX 228, and the American merchant vessel William C. Gorgas- destroying a further 7,197 GRT of shipping. Both incidents occurred on 11 March 1943, fourteen days into her twenty-five-day-long third patrol. Of the seventy-three crewmen on board the Gorgas, twenty-two perished.

On her fourth patrol, U-757 sank the Norwegian Fernhill on 7 August 1943, thirty-one days into her sixty-day patrol, 4,116 GRT of shipping lost in the sea. Of the ship's forty-four crewmen, forty survived the attack, being rescued by the American tanker Idaho two days later.

=== Fate ===
On 8 January 1944 in the North Atlantic, south-west of Ireland, U-757 was hit by depth charges from the British frigate HMS Bayntun and the Canadian corvette HMCS Camrose. U-757 went down with all 49 seamen, at position 50°33′N 18°03′W.

=== Wolfpacks ===
U-757 took part in five wolfpacks, namely:

- Panther (6 – 10 October 1942)
- Neuland (4 – 12 March 1943)
- Without name (11 – 29 July 1943)
- Rügen 5 (6 – 7 January 1944)
- Rügen (7 – 8 January 1944)

== Summary of raiding history ==
Date	Ship Name	Nationality	Tonnage (Note: Merchant ship tonnages are in gross register tons. Military vessels are listed by tons displacement.)	Fate
11 March 1943	William C. Gorgas	United States	7,197	Sunk
11 March 1943	HMS LCT-2398 (Note: Carried by William C. Gorgas.)	Royal Navy	291	Sunk
7 August 1943	Fernhill	Norway	4,116	Sunk

== Bibliography ==
- Busch, Rainer; Röll, Hans-Joachim (1999). German U-boat commanders of World War II : a biographical dictionary. Translated by Brooks, Geoffrey. London, Annapolis, Md: Greenhill Books, Naval Institute Press. ISBN 1-55750-186-6.
- Busch, Rainer; Röll, Hans-Joachim (1999). Der U-Boot-Krieg, 1939-1945: Deutsche U-Boot-Verluste von September 1939 bis Mai 1945 [German U-boat losses from September 1939 to May 1945] (in German). Vol. IV. Hamburg, Berlin, Bonn: Mittler. ISBN 3-8132-0514-2.
- Edwards, Bernard (1996). Dönitz and the Wolf Packs - The U-boats at War. Cassell. p. 173. ISBN 0-304-35203-9.
- Gröner, Eric; Jung, Dieter; Maass, Martin (1991). German Warships 1815-1945: U-boats and Mine Warfare Vessels. Vol. 2. Translated by Thomas, Keith; Magowan, Rachel. London: Conway Maritime Press. ISBN 0-85177-593-4.
