= French corvette Aconit =

Flower-class corvette

Aconit
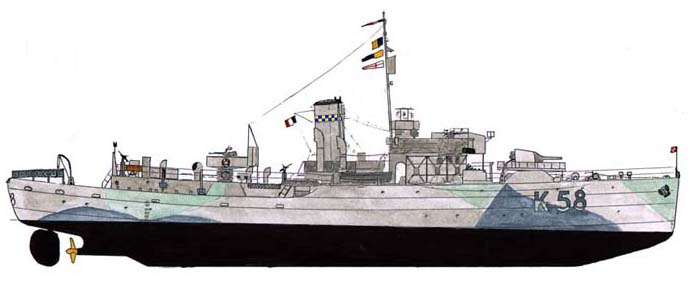
- Aconit in 1942 paint

History

France
- Name: Aconit
- Namesake: Aconitum
- Laid down: 25 March 1940
- Launched: 31 March 1941
- Commissioned: 19 July 1941
- Decommissioned: 30 April 1947
- Identification: Pennant number: K58
- Honours and awards: Ordre de la Libération (21 April 1943); Croix de Guerre 1939–1945 (11 May 1945), both by General Charles de Gaulle; Citation from the British Admiralty
- Fate: Returned to the Royal Navy 30 April 1947; sold July 1947.

General characteristics
- Class & type: Flower-class corvette
- Displacement: 950 tonnes
- Length: 62.7 metres (206 ft)
- Beam: 10.9 metres (36 ft)
- Draught: 2.7 metres (8 ft 10 in)
- Propulsion: Engine: 4-cylinder triple-expansion steam engine; Fuel: Fuel oil; Pressure: 225 PSI; Power:2,750 hp (2 MW)
- Speed: 16 knots (30 km/h; 18 mph)
- Range: 3,450 nautical miles at 12 knots (22 km/h; 14 mph); 2,630 nautical miles at 16 knots (30 km/h; 18 mph); Fuel capacity: 230 tonnes
- Complement: 70
- Sensors & processing systems: Type 271 surface radar
- Armament: 1 BL 4-inch (101.6 mm) Mark IX gun; 1 Mark VIII 40 mm gun; 2 Mark IIA 20 mm guns; 2 Hotchkiss machine guns; 1 Mark III "hedgehog" mortar (24 shells); 4 Mark I depth charge launchers; 2 ramps for Mark I depth charges; 60 depth charges

Aconit (formerly HMS Aconite) was one of the nine Flower-class corvettes lent by the Royal Navy to the Free French Naval Forces. During World War II, she escorted 116 convoys, spending 728 days at sea. She was awarded the Croix de la Libération and the Croix de Guerre 1939–1945, and was cited by the British Admiralty. Following the war she was used as whaling ship for three different companies from 1947 to 1964.

== War service ==
=== Early history 1941-42 ===
Aconite was built by Ailsa Shipbuilding Company Ltd at Troon in Scotland, and was commissioned on 19 July 1941, under Lieutenant de vaisseau Jean Levasseur (fr). She was attached to the Free French Naval Forces (FNFL) on 23 July 1941, and assigned to the Clyde escort group on 17 August 1941, joining the Newfoundland Forces.

Aconit took a very active part in the Battle of the Atlantic for two years, protecting convoys sailing from Newfoundland to the U.K. via Iceland. She also took part to the operations(fr) in Saint-Pierre-et-Miquelon between 10 and 27 December 1941.

In 1942 Aconit, with three other FNFL corvettes, was assigned to Escort Group B-3 of the Mid-Ocean Escort Force and served with this group for the rest of the campaign.

=== 1943 ===
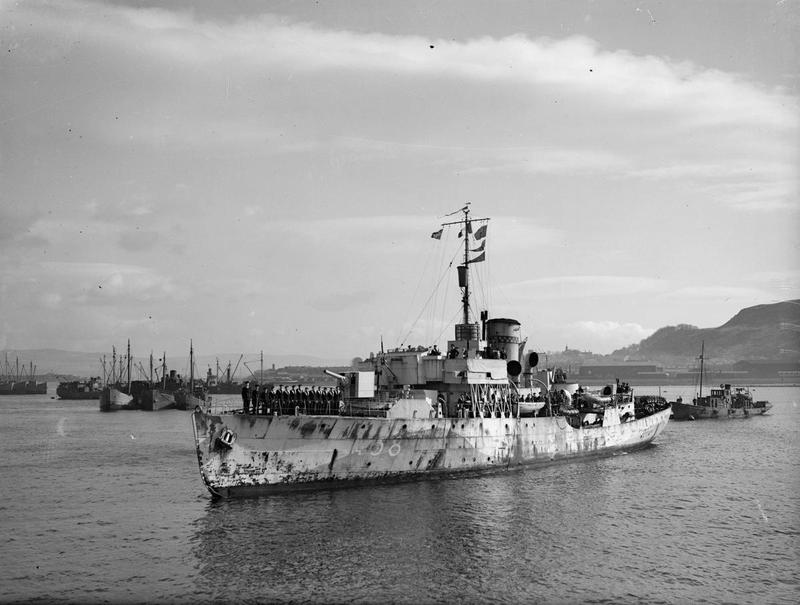
Aconit returning to Greenock 14 March 1943. She sank two U-boats by gunfire and ramming while escorting an Atlantic convoy through a U-boat pack on 10 March 1943

On 10 and 11 March 1943, Aconit, one of eight warships escorting a large convoy HX228, destroyed two German submarines, U-444 and U-432.

On Tuesday 9 March the convoy was five days out from Newfoundland. At 0800 a plane from a U.S. carrier sighted a U-boat 10 miles (16 km) ahead. At 1500, the carrier was short on fuel and had to turn back. At 1930, an ammunition ship had been hit and on a second ship SS Andrea F. Luckenbach, men were taking to the boats.

In response the escort leader, Havant-class destroyer HMS Harvester, hunted U-444 by sweeping through the lumbering convoy. A corvette was detailed to rescue survivors as the underwater search went on. Hours passed as the destroyer remained in the attack area. At midnight, 4 miles (6.4 km) astern of the convoy, silently moving up to regain station U-444 was surfaced and going at top speed after the convoy. After the U-boat dived, Harvester raced over dive position and forced her to surface by depth charge attacks. Circling at speed Harvester searched and spotted the U-boat 500 yards ahead. Making revs for 27 knots (50 km/h) the destroyer rammed U-444, disabling herself in the process. From astern Aconit sighted U-444 as Harvester broke free and closed to make her own ramming attack.

Harvester, dead in the water, picked up one survivor and Aconit another four. Commander Tait ordered Aconit to rejoin convoy HX228 and with only the damaged starboard propeller shaft turning, Harvester limped behind at 9 knots (17 km/h). At 0400 on 10 March, 50 survivors of SS William C. Gorgas (a Liberty ship sunk by U-757) were sighted and rescued. During the morning of 11 March, Harvester's remaining shaft broke. A signal was made to Aconit "Am stopped. Stand by me".

At 1100 Harvester was hit by the first torpedo from U-432. As the officers and crew prepared to abandon ship in the middle of the intensely cold Atlantic, a second torpedo was fired. The captain, seven officers, 136 ratings and 39 survivors were lost. Aconit returned to the scene and forced U-432 to surface, then sank her with artillery fire and ramming. During the day, the French corvette picked up 60 survivors from Harvester, including 12 survivors from the William C. Gorgas. Aconit also captured 12 survivors from U-432, including the second officer.

The senior surviving officer of Harvester, Lieutenant J L Briggs (who had been gunnery control officer) interviewed the second-in-command of U-432, who had launched both torpedoes: "Why did you need to fire the second torpedo so shallow? What did you want to do, kill as many as you could?" The oberleutnant replied "didn't think you were sinking fast enough."

=== To the war's end 1943-45 ===
From 1 to 12 April, Aconit undertook repairs in Glasgow. On 21 April 1943, at Greenock, General Charles de Gaulle came aboard and awarded the corvette and her commander the Croix de la Libération.

Under major repairs from 1 September to 10 October 1943, her commander was replaced by Lieutenant de vaisseau Le Miller. She rejoined the Battle of the Atlantic, attacking a German submarine on 13 December 1943.

Aconit spent the first months of 1944 in Casablanca and Gibraltar, On 6th March 1944 there was an incident at Gibraltar between the French corvette Aconit and the Italian Cruiser Guisseppi Garibaldi, involving French insults to the Italian Flag and vice versa. On 5 June 1944 she escorted the convoy U-3 from Torbay to France, coming under attack from German airplanes. During the Normandy landings, she was attached to the 108th escort group, along with Free French ships Aventure, Escarmouche and Renoncule.

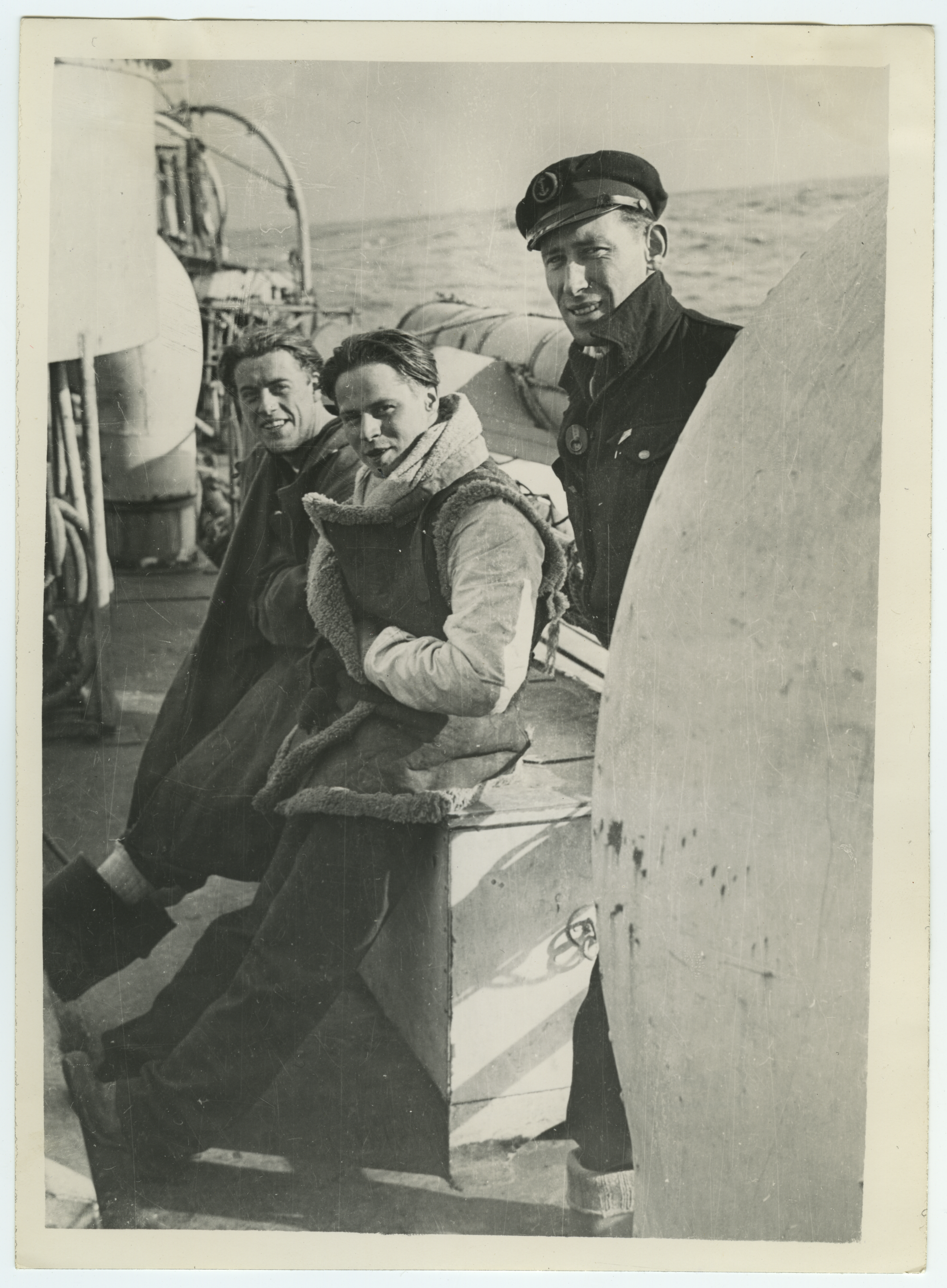
Two German prisoners from one of the U-boats sunk by the French corvette Aconit on 14 March 1943.

She last fired in anger on 11 April 1945. On 18 April, she undertook minor repairs, and returned to escorting convoys in May, until 5 June 1945, the official date for the end of naval operations in European waters.

== Post war ==
Aconit was briefly used by the French naval school, before being given back to the Royal Navy on 30 April 1947 and renamed HMS Aconite.

In July 1947 the ship was sold to United Whalers, London, for whaling purposes. Rebuilt as buoy boat (towing vessel) by Harland & Wolff, Belfast, she was delivered in November as Terje 11 to serve the whaling factory Balaena. The company used a second corvette as Terje 10 (the former HMS Chrysanthemum) In summer 1951 she was converted in a whale catcher with an ice strengthened bow and worked with Balaena until the company gave up whaling at the end of the 1959/1960 season.

In August 1960 the Scottish company Christian Salvesen, with still five former Flower corvettes in service, purchased Terje 11 and renamed the whale catcher Southern Terrier . She worked three seasons with the whaling factory Southern Harvester. She became chartered for her last catching season 1963/1964 by Anders Jahre's A/S Kosmos and worked for the factory ship Kosmos IV, the former German Walter Rau. Laid up in Norway 1964 she was sold for scrapping to Belgium, where she arrived in January 1967.

== Legacy ==
In honour of this unit, three French warships have since been named Aconit including the modern stealth frigate Aconit.

== See also ==
- List of escorteurs of the French Navy

== Sources ==
- Cherry, Cdr. Alex H. (1951). Yankee R.N.: Being the story of a Wall Street banker who volunteered for active duty in the Royal Navy before America came into the war. London: Jarrolds. pp. not cited.
- Le Masson, Henri (1969). The French Navy. Navies of the Second World War. Vol. 2. London: MacDonald & Co. (Publishers) Ltd. pp. 25, 28. ISBN 0356023842.
