= HMS Harvester (H19) =

British H-class destroyer

Coordinates: 51°23′N 28°40′W

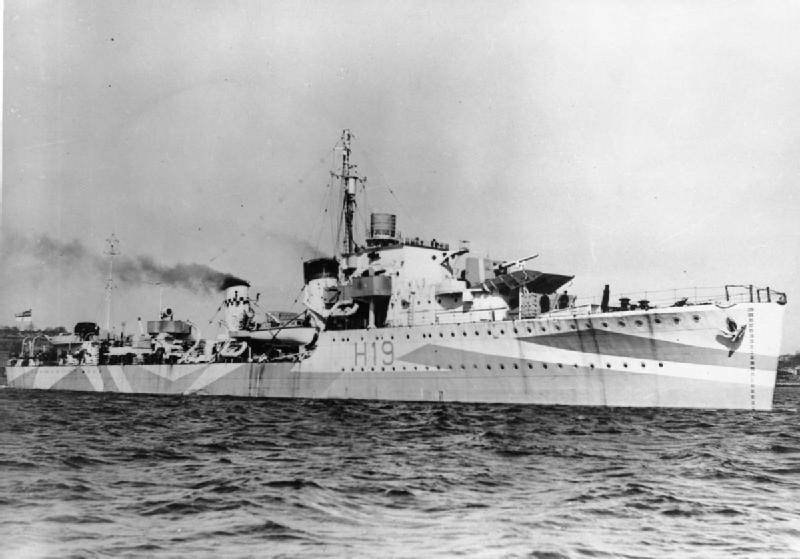
- HMS Harvester after 1942 conversion to escort destroyer

History

Brazil
- Name: Jurua
- Ordered: 6 December 1937
- Builder: Vickers-Armstrongs, Barrow-in-Furness
- Laid down: 3 June 1938
- Fate: Purchased by the United Kingdom, 5 September 1939

United Kingdom
- Name: HMS Handy
- Launched: 29 September 1939
- Acquired: 5 September 1939
- Commissioned: 23 May 1940
- Renamed: HMS Harvester, January 1940
- Identification: Pennant number: H19
- Fate: Sunk, 11 March 1943

General characteristics (as built)
- Class & type: Brazilian H-class destroyer
- Displacement: 1,350 long tons (1,370 t) (standard); 1,883 long tons (1,913 t) (deep load)
- Length: 323 ft (98.5 m)
- Beam: 33 ft (10.1 m)
- Draught: 12 ft 5 in (3.8 m)
- Installed power: 34,000 shp (25,000 kW)
- Propulsion: 2 shafts; Parsons geared steam turbines; 3 Admiralty water-tube boilers
- Speed: 36 knots (67 km/h; 41 mph)
- Range: 5,530 nmi (10,240 km; 6,360 mi) at 15 knots (28 km/h; 17 mph)
- Complement: 145
- Sensors & processing systems: ASDIC
- Armament: 3 × 1 - QF 4.7-inch (120 mm) Mk IX guns; 2 × 4 - .50 cal machine guns; 2 × 4 - 21 inch (533 mm) torpedo tubes; 110 × depth charges, 3 rails and 8 throwers

HMS Harvester was an H-class destroyer originally ordered by the Brazilian Navy with the name Jurua in the late 1930s, but bought by the Royal Navy after the beginning of World War II in September 1939. Almost immediately after being commissioned, in May 1940, the ship began evacuating Allied troops from Dunkirk and other locations in France. Afterwards she was assigned to the Western Approaches Command for convoy escort duties. Harvester and another destroyer sank a German submarine in October. She was briefly assigned to Force H in May 1941, but her anti-aircraft armament was deemed too weak and she was transferred to the Newfoundland Escort Force in June 1941 for escort duties in the North Atlantic. The ship was returned to the Western Approaches Command in October 1941 and was converted to an escort destroyer in early 1942. Harvester was torpedoed and sunk in March 1943 by a German submarine after having rammed and sunk another submarine the previous day while escorting Convoy HX 228.

== Description ==
Harvester displaced 1,350 long tons (1,370 t) at standard load and 1,883 long tons (1,913 t) at deep load. The ship had an overall length of 323 feet (98.5 m), a beam of 33 feet (10.1 m) and a draught of 12 feet 5 inches (3.8 m). She was powered by Parsons geared steam turbines, driving two shafts, which developed a total of 34,000 shaft horsepower (25,000 kW) and gave a maximum speed of 36 knots (67 km/h; 41 mph). Steam for the turbines was provided by three Admiralty 3-drum water-tube boilers. Harvester carried a maximum of 470 long tons (480 t) of fuel oil, giving her a range of 5,530 nautical miles (10,240 km; 6,360 mi) at 15 knots (28 km/h; 17 mph). The ship's complement was 152 officers and men.

The vessel was designed for four 45-calibre 4.7-inch Mk IX guns in single mounts, designated 'A', 'B', 'X', and 'Y' from front to rear, but 'Y' gun was removed to compensate for the additional depth charges added. For anti-aircraft (AA) defence, Harvester had two quadruple Mark I mounts for the 0.5 inch Vickers Mark III machine gun. She was fitted with two above-water quadruple torpedo tube mounts for 21-inch (533 mm) torpedoes. One depth charge rail and two throwers were originally fitted, but this was increased to three sets of rails and eight throwers while fitting-out. The ship's load of depth charges was also increased, from 20 to 110.

=== Wartime modifications ===
Harvester had her rear torpedo tubes replaced by a 12-pounder AA gun after the evacuation of Dunkirk in 1940, but it is not known exactly when this modification was made. During her 1942 conversion to an escort destroyer, the ship's short-range AA armament had been augmented by two Oerlikon 20 mm guns on the wings of the ship's bridge. The .50-calibre machine gun mounts were replaced by a pair of Oerlikons later. 'A' gun was replaced by a Hedgehog anti-submarine spigot mortar. The ship's director-control tower and rangefinder above the bridge were removed in exchange for a Type 271 target indication radar. A Type 286 short-range surface search radar was probably also fitted midway through the war. The ship also received a HF/DF radio direction finder mounted on a pole mainmast.

== Service ==
Jurua was ordered by Brazil on 6 December 1937 from Vickers-Armstrongs, Barrow-in-Furness. The ship was laid down on 3 June 1938 and she was purchased by the British on 5 September 1939 and renamed HMS Handy. The ship was launched on 29 September 1939 and renamed Harvester in January 1940 as her original name was thought too liable to be confused with Hardy. Harvester was commissioned on 23 May and briefly worked up at Portland Harbour before she was assigned to the 9th Destroyer Flotilla.

The ship joined the Dunkirk evacuation on 29 May and returned 272 men to Dover during the day. However, the situation at Dunkirk soon became too dangerous to risk the larger and more modern destroyers, so Harvester made no attempt to evacuate any troops during daylight hours on 30 May. This decision was rescinded during the day on 30 May and the ship sailed for Dunkirk on the night of 30/31 May. En route she was narrowly missed by two torpedoes, but she rescued 1341 men in two trips on 31 May and an additional 576 on 1 June. Harvester was lightly damaged by strafing German aircraft that same day and required repairs that were made at Chatham. On 9 June the ship was ordered to Le Havre, France, to evacuate British troops, but none were to be found. She loaded 78 men at Saint-Valery-en-Caux on 11 June. Later in the month she escorted ships evacuating refugees and troops from Saint-Nazaire and St. Jean de Luz (Operation Aerial).

From July to September, Harvester was assigned to convoy escort duties with the Western Approaches Command and she rescued 90 survivors from the armed merchant cruiser HMS Dunvegan Castle on 27 August. The ship, together with five other destroyers of the 9th Flotilla, was assigned to Plymouth Command for anti-invasion duties between 8 and 18 September before returning to her role as an escort vessel. On 30 October, with help from her sister Highlander, she sank the German submarine U-32. Harvester rescued 19 survivors from the merchant vessel Silverpine on 5 December and 131 survivors from the ocean boarding vessel HMS Crispin torpedoed by U-107 on 3 February 1941. She also rescued four survivors from a Royal Air Force Armstrong Whitworth Whitley bomber four days later.

The ship was refitted at Barrow between 18 March and 18 April and then was assigned to Force H in Gibraltar where she escorted ships during Operations Tiger and Splice in May. Harvester was transferred to the Newfoundland Escort Force in June as her anti-aircraft capability was believed by Admiral James Somerville to be too weak. She was assigned to the 14th Escort Group upon her arrival at St. John's on 1 July. The ship was transferred back to the Western Approaches Command three months later and assigned to the 9th Escort Group. Harvester was converted to an escort destroyer during a lengthy refit at Dundee, Scotland, from 30 January 1942 to 16 April. She conducted sea trials of her Type 271 radar during May and then resumed her escort duties in the North Atlantic as flagship of Mid-Ocean Escort Force Escort Group B-3.

The ship was refitted at Liverpool between 12 December and 11 February 1943. Whilst defending Convoy HX 228 on 3 March, Harvester forced U-444 to the surface and then rammed it. She was badly damaged by the ramming, suffering damage to her propellers in the process, but rescued five survivors after the submarine sank. The next day, Harvester was torpedoed by U-432 and broke in half. Nine officers and 136 ratings were lost, including her commander and Escort Group leader AA "Harry" Tait, but the French corvette Aconit rammed and sank U-432 herself and then rescued Harvester's few survivors.
