= German submarine U-432 =

German World War II submarine

Coordinates: 51.5833°N 28.3333°W

History

Nazi Germany
- Name: U-432
- Ordered: 23 September 1939
- Builder: Schichau-Werke, Danzig
- Yard number: 1473
- Laid down: 14 January 1940
- Launched: 3 February 1941
- Commissioned: 26 April 1941
- Fate: Sunk on 11 March 1943

General characteristics
- Class & type: Type VIIC submarine
- Displacement: 769 tonnes (757 long tons) surfaced; 871 t (857 long tons) submerged
- Length: 67.10 m (220 ft 2 in) o/a; 50.50 m (165 ft 8 in) pressure hull
- Beam: 6.20 m (20 ft 4 in) o/a; 4.70 m (15 ft 5 in) pressure hull
- Height: 9.60 m (31 ft 6 in)
- Draught: 4.74 m (15 ft 7 in)
- Installed power: 2,800–3,200 PS (2,100–2,400 kW; 2,800–3,200 bhp) (diesels); 750 PS (550 kW; 740 shp) (electric)
- Propulsion: 2 shafts; 2 × diesel engines; 2 × electric motors
- Speed: 17.7 knots (32.8 km/h; 20.4 mph) surfaced; 7.6 knots (14.1 km/h; 8.7 mph) submerged
- Range: 8,500 nmi (15,700 km; 9,800 mi) at 10 knots (19 km/h; 12 mph) surfaced; 80 nmi (150 km; 92 mi) at 4 knots (7.4 km/h; 4.6 mph) submerged
- Test depth: 230 m (750 ft); Crush depth: 250–295 m (820–968 ft)
- Complement: 4 officers, 40–56 enlisted
- Armament: 5 × 53.3 cm (21 in) torpedo tubes (four bow, one stern); 14 × torpedoes or 26 TMA mines; 1 × 8.8 cm (3.46 in) deck gun (220 rounds); 1 x 2 cm (0.79 in) C/30 AA gun

Service record
- Part of: 3rd U-boat Flotilla; 26 April 1941 – 11 March 1943
- Identification codes: M 41 658
- Commanders: Kptlt. Heinz-Otto Schultze; 26 April 1941 – 15 January 1943; Kptlt. Hermann Eckhardt; 16 January – 11 March 1943
- Operations: 8 patrols: 1st patrol: 25 August – 19 September 1941; 2nd patrol: 11 October – 2 November 1941; 3rd patrol: 10 – 23 December 1941; 4th patrol: 21 January – 16 March 1942; 5th patrol: 30 April – 2 July 1942; 6th patrol: 15 August – 4 October 1942; 7th patrol: 30 November – 5 January 1943; 8th patrol: 14 February – 11 March 1943
- Victories: 20 merchant ships sunk (67,991 GRT); 1 warship sunk (1,340 tons); 2 merchant ships damaged (15,666 GRT)

German submarine U-432 was a Type VIIC U-boat of Nazi Germany's Kriegsmarine during World War II that carried out eight patrols, sinking 20 enemy ships and one warship. Two other vessels were damaged. U-432 was a member of seven wolfpacks and was eventually sunk by a Free French Navy escort in mid-Atlantic on 11 March 1943.

== Design ==
German Type VIIC submarines were preceded by the shorter Type VIIB submarines. U-432 had a displacement of 769 tonnes (757 long tons) when at the surface and 871 tonnes (857 long tons) while submerged. She had a total length of 67.10 m (220 ft 2 in), a pressure hull length of 50.50 m (165 ft 8 in), a beam of 6.20 m (20 ft 4 in), a height of 9.60 m (31 ft 6 in), and a draught of 4.74 m (15 ft 7 in). The submarine was powered by two Germaniawerft F46 four-stroke, six-cylinder supercharged diesel engines producing a total of 2,800 to 3,200 metric horsepower (2,060 to 2,350 kW; 2,760 to 3,160 shp) for use while surfaced, two AEG GU 460/8–27 double-acting electric motors producing a total of 750 metric horsepower (550 kW; 740 shp) for use while submerged. She had two shafts and two 1.23 m (4 ft) propellers. The boat was capable of operating at depths of up to 230 metres (750 ft).

The submarine had a maximum surface speed of 17.7 knots (32.8 km/h; 20.4 mph) and a maximum submerged speed of 7.6 knots (14.1 km/h; 8.7 mph). When submerged, the boat could operate for 80 nautical miles (150 km; 92 mi) at 4 knots (7.4 km/h; 4.6 mph); when surfaced, she could travel 8,500 nautical miles (15,700 km; 9,800 mi) at 10 knots (19 km/h; 12 mph). U-432 was fitted with five 53.3 cm (21 in) torpedo tubes (four fitted at the bow and one at the stern), fourteen torpedoes, one 8.8 cm (3.46 in) SK C/35 naval gun, 220 rounds, and a 2 cm (0.79 in) C/30 anti-aircraft gun. The boat had a complement of between forty-four and sixty.

== Service history ==
The submarine was laid down on 14 January 1940 at Schichau-Werke in Danzig (now Gdansk) as yard number 1473, launched on 3 February 1941 and commissioned on 26 April 1941 under the command of Kapitänleutnant Heinz-Otto Schultze.

She served with the 3rd U-boat Flotilla from 26 April 1941 for training and stayed with that unit from 1 August for operations until her loss.

=== First patrol ===
U-432's first patrol was preceded by short 'hops' from Kiel in Germany to Horten Naval Base then Trondheim in Norway. Her first patrol proper began with her departure from Trondheim on 25 August 1941 and headed for the Atlantic Ocean via the gap between Iceland and the Faroe Islands.

The boat sank the Winterwijk on 10 September east of Greenland. She went on to sink the Stargad close by on the same date. The next day she sank the Garm northeast of the previous successes.

She docked at Brest in occupied France on 19 September.

=== Second and third patrols ===
On her second foray, she sank the Ulea on 28 October 1941 east-northeast of the Azores. She finished the patrol in St. Nazaire on 2 November 1941.

The boat's third sortie commenced with her departure from St. Nazaire on 10 December 1941. This was not only the shortest patrol of her career but the only time she returned to France, (this time to La Pallice where she would be based for the rest of her time), without success, on the 23rd.

=== Fourth patrol ===
Her fourth patrol was carried out on the eastern seaboard of Canada and the United States, where she sank a number of ships, including the-then neutral Brazilian vessels Buarque and the Olinda on 15 and 18 February 1942 respectively. She also sent the Miraflores and the Azolea City to the bottom on the 19th and 21st.

=== Fifth patrol ===
U-432 had departed La Pallice on 30 April 1942. On 2 May, she was slightly damaged in an air attack on 2 May west of the Bay of Biscay. She returned to her earlier hunting grounds across the Atlantic where she sank ships such as the Zurichmoor (on the 23rd) and the Malayan Prince on 9 June.

On 30 May, she torpedoed and sank the Liverpool Packet off the south-eastern tip of Nova Scotia. Of her 21 crew, two were killed when the torpedo struck. U-432 approached the 19 survivors, who had taken to lifeboats, and Schultze gave them directions to the nearest land. After 20 hours rowing, they succeeded in reaching Seal Island, off Cape Sable, Nova Scotia.

=== Sixth patrol ===
The submarine encountered some resistance when she came across the Pennmar off Cape Farewell (Greenland) on 24 September 1942. A torpedo fired from the starboard quarter was avoided by evasive action. On surfacing, the U-boat was engaged by Pennmar's 4 in gun. U-432 submerged again and fired a spread of four torpedoes, one of which hit and sank the American freighter.

=== Seventh patrol ===
For her seventh journey, the boat headed towards North Africa. She sank the Free-French trawler Poitou off Morocco on 17 December 1942.

=== Eighth patrol and loss ===
U-432 sank HMS Harvester on 11 March 1943 after the British destroyer was badly damaged while ramming U-444. The French corvette Aconit came to Harvester's assistance. She depth charged and sank the U-boat in mid-Atlantic.

Twenty-six men went down with U-432; there were 20 survivors.

=== Wolfpacks ===
U-432 took part in seven wolfpacks, namely:

- Markgraf (28 August – 14 September 1941)
- Reissewolf (21 – 28 October 1941)
- Pfadfinder (21 – 27 May 1942)
- Lohs (23 August – 22 September 1942)
- Sturmbock (23 – 26 February 1943)
- Wildfang (26 February – 5 March 1943)
- Westmark (6 – 11 March 1943)

== Summary of raiding history ==
Date	Ship Name	Nationality	Tonnage (Note: Merchant ship tonnages are in gross register tons. Military vessels are listed by tons displacement.)	Fate
10 September 1941	Muneric	United Kingdom	5,229	Sunk
10 September 1941	Stargard	Norway	1,113	Sunk
10 September 1941	Winterswijk	Netherlands	3,205	Sunk
11 September 1941	Garm	Sweden	1,231	Sunk
17 October 1941	Barfonn	Norway	9,739	Sunk
17 October 1941	Bold Venture	Panama	3,222	Sunk
17 October 1941	Evros	Greece	5,283	Sunk
28 October 1941	Ulea	United Kingdom	1,574	Sunk
15 February 1942	Buarque	Brazil	5,152	Sunk
18 February 1942	Olinda	Brazil	4,053	Sunk
19 February 1942	Miraflores	United Kingdom	2,158	Sunk
21 February 1942	Azalea City	United States	5,529	Sunk
27 February 1942	Marore	United States	8,215	Sunk
17 May 1942	Foam	United States	324	Sunk
23 May 1942	Zurichmoor	United Kingdom	4,455	Sunk
31 May 1942	Liverpool Packet	Canada	1,188	Sunk
3 June 1942	Aeolus	United States	41	Sunk
3 June 1942	Ben and Josephine	United States	102	Sunk
9 June 1942	Kronprinsen	Norway	7,073	Damaged
9 June 1942	Malayan Prince	United Kingdom	8,593	Damaged
24 September 1942	Pennmar	United States	5,868	Sunk
17 December 1942	Poitou	Free France	310	Sunk
11 March 1943	HMS Harvester	Royal Navy	1,340	Sunk

== Bibliography ==
- Busch, Rainer; Röll, Hans-Joachim (1999). German U-boat commanders of World War II : a biographical dictionary. Translated by Brooks, Geoffrey. London, Annapolis, Md: Greenhill Books, Naval Institute Press. ISBN 1-55750-186-6.
- Busch, Rainer; Röll, Hans-Joachim (1999). Deutsche U-Boot-Verluste von September 1939 bis Mai 1945 [German U-boat losses from September 1939 to May 1945]. Der U-Boot-Krieg (in German). Vol. IV. Hamburg, Berlin, Bonn: Mittler. ISBN 3-8132-0514-2.
- Gröner, Erich; Jung, Dieter; Maass, Martin (1991). U-boats and Mine Warfare Vessels. German Warships 1815–1945. Vol. 2. Translated by Thomas, Keith; Magowan, Rachel. London: Conway Maritime Press. ISBN 0-85177-593-4.
- Kemp, Paul (1999). U-Boats Destroyed - German Submarine Losses in the World Wars. London: Arms & Armour. ISBN 1-85409-515-3.
