= German submarine U-444 =

German World War II submarine

Coordinates: 51°14′N 29°18′W

History

Nazi Germany
- Name: U-444
- Ordered: 13 April 1940
- Builder: Schichau-Werke, Danzig
- Yard number: 1499
- Laid down: 10 February 1941
- Launched: 26 February 1942
- Commissioned: 9 May 1942
- Fate: Sunk on 11 March 1943

General characteristics
- Class & type: Type VIIC submarine
- Displacement: 769 tonnes (757 long tons) surfaced; 871 t (857 long tons) submerged
- Length: 67.10 m (220 ft 2 in) o/a; 50.50 m (165 ft 8 in) pressure hull
- Beam: 6.20 m (20 ft 4 in) o/a; 4.70 m (15 ft 5 in) pressure hull
- Height: 9.60 m (31 ft 6 in)
- Draught: 4.74 m (15 ft 7 in)
- Installed power: 2,800–3,200 PS (2,100–2,400 kW; 2,800–3,200 bhp) (diesels); 750 PS (550 kW; 740 shp) (electric)
- Propulsion: 2 shafts; 2 × diesel engines; 2 × electric motors
- Speed: 17.7 knots (32.8 km/h; 20.4 mph) surfaced; 7.6 knots (14.1 km/h; 8.7 mph) submerged
- Range: 8,500 nmi (15,700 km; 9,800 mi) at 10 knots (19 km/h; 12 mph) surfaced; 80 nmi (150 km; 92 mi) at 4 knots (7.4 km/h; 4.6 mph) submerged
- Test depth: 230 m (750 ft); Crush depth: 250–295 m (820–968 ft)
- Complement: 4 officers, 40–56 enlisted
- Armament: 5 × 53.3 cm (21 in) torpedo tubes (four bow, one stern); 14 × torpedoes; 1 × 8.8 cm (3.46 in) deck gun (220 rounds); 1 x 2 cm (0.79 in) C/30 AA gun

Service record
- Part of: 8th U-boat Flotilla; 9 May – 31 December 1942; 3rd U-boat Flotilla; 1 January – 11 March 1943
- Identification codes: M 46 179
- Commanders: Oblt.z.S. Albert Langfeld; 9 May 1942 – 11 March 1943
- Operations: 2 patrols: 1st patrol: 17 December 1942 – 3 February 1943; 2nd patrol: 1 – 11 March 1943
- Victories: None

German submarine U-444 was a Type VIIC U-boat of Nazi Germany's Kriegsmarine during World War II.

She carried out two patrols, and was a member of three wolfpacks, but sank no ships.

She was sunk by Allied warships in mid-Atlantic on 11 March 1943.

== Design ==
German Type VIIC submarines were preceded by the shorter Type VIIB submarines. U-444 had a displacement of 769 tonnes (757 long tons) when at the surface and 871 tonnes (857 long tons) while submerged. She had a total length of 67.10 m (220 ft 2 in), a pressure hull length of 50.50 m (165 ft 8 in), a beam of 6.20 m (20 ft 4 in), a height of 9.60 m (31 ft 6 in), and a draught of 4.74 m (15 ft 7 in). The submarine was powered by two Germaniawerft F46 four-stroke, six-cylinder supercharged diesel engines producing a total of 2,800 to 3,200 metric horsepower (2,060 to 2,350 kW; 2,760 to 3,160 shp) for use while surfaced, two AEG GU 460/8–27 double-acting electric motors producing a total of 750 metric horsepower (550 kW; 740 shp) for use while submerged. She had two shafts and two 1.23 m (4 ft) propellers. The boat was capable of operating at depths of up to 230 metres (750 ft).

The submarine had a maximum surface speed of 17.7 knots (32.8 km/h; 20.4 mph) and a maximum submerged speed of 7.6 knots (14.1 km/h; 8.7 mph). When submerged, the boat could operate for 80 nautical miles (150 km; 92 mi) at 4 knots (7.4 km/h; 4.6 mph); when surfaced, she could travel 8,500 nautical miles (15,700 km; 9,800 mi) at 10 knots (19 km/h; 12 mph). U-444 was fitted with five 53.3 cm (21 in) torpedo tubes (four fitted at the bow and one at the stern), fourteen torpedoes, one 8.8 cm (3.46 in) SK C/35 naval gun, 220 rounds, and a 2 cm (0.79 in) C/30 anti-aircraft gun. The boat had a complement of between forty-four and sixty.

== Service history ==
The submarine was laid down on 10 February 1941 at Schichau-Werke in Danzig (now Gdansk) as yard number 1499, launched on 26 February 1942 and commissioned on 9 May under the command of Oberleutnant zur See Albert Langfeld.

She served with the 8th U-boat Flotilla from 9 May 1942 for training, during which time U-444 accidentally rammed and sank U-612, and the 3rd flotilla from 1 January 1943 for operations.

=== First patrol ===
U-444's first patrol began from Kiel in Germany on 17 December 1942. She headed for the Atlantic Ocean, via the gap separating the Faroe and Shetland Islands. She arrived at La Pallice in occupied France on 3 February 1943.

=== Second patrol and loss ===
U-444 left La Pallice on 1 March 1943; on the 11th she was sunk in mid-Atlantic by a combination of depth charges and ramming by the British destroyer HMS Harvester and the Free French corvette Aconit.

Forty-one men went down with U-444; there were four survivors.

=== Wolfpacks ===
U-444 took part in three wolfpacks, namely:

- Falke (28 December 1942 – 19 January 1943)
- Landsknecht (19 – 24 January 1943)
- Neuland (8 – 11 March 1943)

== Bibliography ==
- Busch, Rainer; Röll, Hans-Joachim (1999). German U-boat commanders of World War II : a biographical dictionary. Translated by Brooks, Geoffrey. London, Annapolis, Md: Greenhill Books, Naval Institute Press. ISBN 1-55750-186-6.
- Busch, Rainer; Röll, Hans-Joachim (1999). Deutsche U-Boot-Verluste von September 1939 bis Mai 1945 [German U-boat losses from September 1939 to May 1945]. Der U-Boot-Krieg (in German). Vol. IV. Hamburg, Berlin, Bonn: Mittler. ISBN 3-8132-0514-2.
- Gröner, Erich; Jung, Dieter; Maass, Martin (1991). U-boats and Mine Warfare Vessels. German Warships 1815–1945. Vol. 2. Translated by Thomas, Keith; Magowan, Rachel. London: Conway Maritime Press. ISBN 0-85177-593-4.
- Kemp, Paul (1999). U-Boats Destroyed - German Submarine Losses in the World Wars. London: Arms & Armour. ISBN 1-85409-515-3.
