= January 1942 =

Month of 1942

<<	January 1942					>>
Su	Mo	Tu	We	Th	Fr	Sa
				1	2	3
4	5	6	7	8	9	10
11	12	13	14	15	16	17
18	19	20	21	22	23	24
25	26	27	28	29	30	31

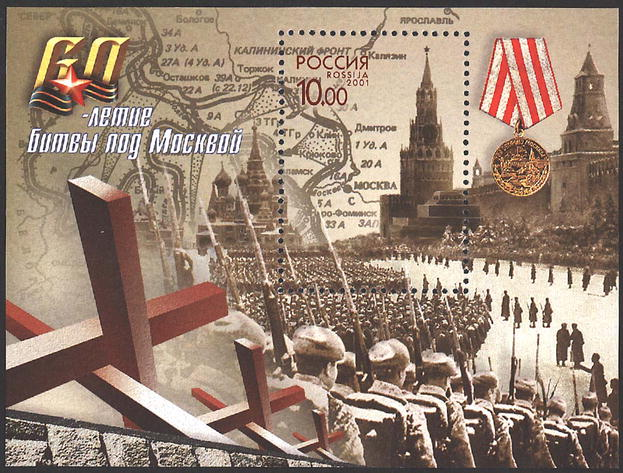
January 7, 1942: Soviet Red Army successfully defends Moscow from Nazi German invasion.

The following events occurred in January 1942:

== January 1, 1942 (Thursday) ==
- The Declaration by United Nations was agreed upon during the Arcadia Conference in Washington, D.C. Representatives of 26 Allied nations pledged to employ their "full resources" until victory was won and not to make any separate peace agreements with Axis powers.
- An explosion at Sneyd Colliery in Burslem, Staffordshire, killed 57.
- The Oregon State Beavers defeated the Duke Blue Devils 20–16 in the 28th Rose Bowl game. The venue was moved from Rose Bowl Stadium in Pasadena, California, to the Blue Devils' home stadium in Durham, North Carolina, due to fears about a Japanese attack on the U.S. West Coast.
- During a driving rainstorm, the Fordham Rams edged the Missouri Tigers 2–0 in the Sugar Bowl.
- The Alabama Crimson Tide beat the Texas A&M Aggies 29–21 in the Cotton Bowl Classic.
- The Georgia Bulldogs beat the TCU Horned Frogs 40–26 in the Orange Bowl.
- The Tulsa Golden Hurricane beat the Texas Tech Red Raiders 6–0 in the Sun Bowl.
- The comedy film The Man Who Came to Dinner starring Bette Davis, Ann Sheridan, Monty Woolley and Jimmy Durante premiered at the Strand Theatre in New York City.
- Born:
  - Country Joe McDonald, musician, in Washington, D.C.;
  - Gennadi Sarafanov, cosmonaut, in Sinenkiye, Saratov Oblast, USSR (d. 2005)

== January 2, 1942 (Friday) ==
- Japanese forces entered Manila.
- Axis forces surrendered at Bardia, Libya. Some 2,200 German troops and 4,400 Italians were captured.
- The Battle of Kampar ended in tactical Allied victory.
- The Foreign Claims Act went into effect in the United States.
- The marriage of Dorothy Thompson and Sinclair Lewis was legally dissolved.
- German submarine U-603 was commissioned.
- Born:
  - Dennis Hastert, politician and former Speaker of the U.S. House of Representatives, in Aurora, Illinois;
  - Hugh Shelton, military officer, in Tarboro, North Carolina
- Died: Henriette Gottlieb, 57, German soprano (died in the Łódź Ghetto)

== January 3, 1942 (Saturday) ==
- The Japanese made amphibious landings on the island of Labuan off the coast of Borneo.
- The Soviet cruiser Krasnyi Kavkaz was bombed and damaged by Stukas of StG 77 off the Kerch Peninsula. Repairs took until October to complete.
- Sir Archibald Wavell was named head of the American-British-Dutch-Australian Command (ABDACOM).
- Born:
  - László Sólyom, 3rd President of Hungary, in Pécs, Hungary (d. 2023)
  - John Thaw, actor, in Longsight, Manchester, England (d. 2002)

== January 4, 1942 (Sunday) ==
- The Japanese 14th Army captured Guagua in the Philippines.
- The Japanese seaplane tender Chitose was bombed by B-17 Flying Fortresses off Davao City but damage sustained was negligible.
- The fourth National Football League All-Star Game was held at the Polo Grounds in New York City. The Chicago Bears defeated an all-star team 35–24. The game was originally scheduled to be held in Los Angeles where the first three all-star games were held, but it was moved to New York due to wartime travel restrictions.
- Born: Bolaji Akinyemi, External Affairs Minister of Nigeria, in Ilesa, Nigeria
- Died:
  - Volodia Dubinin, 13, Russian partisan and Pioneer Hero of the Soviet Union (killed by a land mine);
  - Mel Sheppard, 58, American athlete and four-time Olympic gold medalist;
  - Otis Skinner, 83, American stage actor

== January 5, 1942 (Monday) ==
- American and Philippine forces on Luzon retreated to a defensive line at the base of the Bataan Peninsula.
- The Soviet 10th Army retook Belyov.
- Egypt broke off diplomatic relations with Bulgaria and Finland.
- Born:
  - Maurizio Pollini, classical pianist, in Milan, Italy (d. 2024)
  - Charlie Rose, television talk show host and journalist, in Henderson, North Carolina

== January 6, 1942 (Tuesday) ==
- U.S. President Franklin D. Roosevelt gave the State of the Union Address to Congress. "In fulfilling my duty to report upon the State of the Union, I am proud to say to you that the spirit of the American people was never higher than it is today—the Union was never more closely knit together—this country was never more deeply determined to face the solemn tasks before it", the president began. "The response of the American people has been instantaneous, and it will be sustained until our security is assured ... We have not been stunned. We have not been terrified or confused. This very reassembling of the Seventy-seventh Congress today is proof of that; for the mood of quiet, grim resolution which here prevails bodes ill for those who conspired and collaborated to murder world peace. That mood is stronger than any mere desire for revenge. It expresses the will of the American people to make very certain that the world will never so suffer again."
- Japanese troops landed at Brunei Bay in British Borneo.
- Australia declared war on Bulgaria.
- Died: Henri de Baillet-Latour, 65, Belgian aristocrat and the third president of the International Olympic Committee

== January 7, 1942 (Wednesday) ==
- The Battle of Moscow ended in strategic Soviet victory.
- Joseph Stalin ordered a general offensive along the entire front, over his generals' recommendations that he concentrate his forces.
- The Battle of Bataan began.
- U.S. President Franklin D. Roosevelt presented Congress with the biggest budget ever seen up to that time. It called for the expenditure of $77 billion over the next 18 months, $56 billion of which was for the war effort. The plan called for the production of 125,000 aircraft, 75,000 tanks, 35,000 guns and 8 million tons of shipping by the end of 1943.
- Born: Vasily Alekseyev, weightlifter, in Pokrovo-Shishkino, Ryazan Oblast, USSR (d. 2011)

== January 8, 1942 (Thursday) ==
- The Battles of Rzhev began on the Eastern Front.
- Adolf Hitler had Generaloberst Erich Hoepner sacked for ordering his forces to pull back on the Eastern Front without approval. Hitler not only had Hoepner removed from command but deprived him of his pension and the right to wear his uniform as well.
- German submarines U-604 and U-660 were commissioned.
- Born:
  - Stephen Hawking, theoretical physicist, cosmologist and author, in Oxford, England (d. 2018);
  - Junichirō Koizumi, 87th Prime Minister of Japan, in Yokosuka, Kanagawa
  - Vyacheslav Zudov, cosmonaut, in Bor, Gorky Oblast, USSR (d. 2024)

== January 9, 1942 (Friday) ==
- The Battle of Dražgoše began between the Slovene Partisans and Nazi occupying forces.
- The British destroyer HMS Vimiera struck a naval mine and sank in the Thames Estuary.
- Admiral Isoroku Yamamoto made a statement to Taketora Ogata that may have been the basis for the apocryphal sleeping giant quote attributed to him when he said, "A military man can scarcely pride himself on having 'smitten a sleeping enemy'; it is more a matter of shame, simply, for the one smitten. I would rather you made your appraisal after seeing what the enemy does, since it is certain that, angered and outraged, he will soon launch a determined counterattack."
- Joe Louis knocked out Buddy Baer in the first round at Madison Square Garden to retain the World Heavyweight Boxing Championship.
- Died: Heber Doust Curtis, 69, American astronomer

== January 10, 1942 (Saturday) ==
- Port Swettenham 24 miles southwest of Kuala Lumpur was abandoned by British forces to the Japanese.
- Joe Louis enlisted in the U.S. Army.
- Movie stars Mickey Rooney and Ava Gardner were married at a Protestant church in Ballard, California.
- German submarine U-513 was commissioned.
- The gangster-themed thriller film All Through the Night starring Humphrey Bogart, Conrad Veidt and Kaaren Verne was released.

== January 11, 1942 (Sunday) ==
- Japan declared war on the Netherlands. The Battle of Tarakan began when the Japanese landed at Tarakan Island in northeastern Borneo.
- The Battle of Kuala Lumpur was fought, with the city falling to the Japanese.
- The Battle of Manado began on the Minahasa peninsula on the northern part of the island of Celebes.
- The Battle of Dražgoše ended with brutal reprisals of German forces against the villagers and the destruction of the village.
- Soviet forces retook Lyudinovo on the rail line between Vyazma and Bryansk.
- The American cargo ship USAT Liberty was torpedoed by Japanese submarine I-166 and beached on the island of Bali.
- The British cargo steamship Cyclops was torpedoed and sunk off the coast of Nova Scotia by German submarine U-123. It was the first attack of the Kriegsmarine's Operation Drumbeat aiming to destroy Allied shipping in the Western Atlantic.
- Born: Clarence Clemons, saxophonist, in Norfolk County, Virginia (d. 2011)

== January 12, 1942 (Monday) ==
- In combat in the Battle of Bataan, 2nd Lt. Alexander R. Nininger was killed as he led his Philippine Scouts unit and attacked Japanese positions. A 1941 graduate of West Point, "Sandy" Nininger would posthumously receive the first Medal of Honor of World War II.
- The Battle of Tarakan ended in Japanese victory.
- In North Africa, the British took Sallum after a 56-day siege when the Germans ran out of ammunition.
- German submarine U-374 was sunk in the Mediterranean by torpedoes from the British submarine HMS Unbeaten.
- The Roosevelt Administration created a National War Labor Board to prevent strikes and reconcile wages with control over inflation and the war economy.
- Joe Louis reported for duty at Camp Upton. A large contingent of reporters turned up to make photographs and newsreel film of the boxing champion in uniform.

== January 13, 1942 (Tuesday) ==
- The Battle of Manado ended in Japanese victory.
- Representatives of Allied governments in exile signed the declaration on Punishment for War Crimes in London declaring that one of their principal war aims would be to ensure that those responsible for war crimes would be brought to justice.
- In the United States, the Sikorsky R-4 helicopter had its first flight.
- Heinkel test pilot Helmut Schenck became the first person to escape from an aircraft using an ejection seat when his control surfaces iced up and became inoperative.

== January 14, 1942 (Wednesday) ==
- The Battle of Gemas was fought in Malaya, resulting in tactical Australian victory.
- The Battle of Muar began in the Malayan Campaign.
- British forces conducted Operation Postmaster on the Spanish island of Fernando Po. Two tugs and the Italian merchant vessel Duchessa d'Aosta were captured and sailed away.
- The Arcadia Conference concluded.
- Voćin massacre, 350 Serbs were slaughtered by Ustashe in Croatia.
- German submarine U-257 was commissioned.
- Born: Yogesh Kumar Sabharwal, 36th Chief Justice of India, in New Delhi, British India (d. 2015)
- Died: Porfirio Barba-Jacob, 58, Colombian poet and writer

== January 15, 1942 (Thursday) ==
- The third Battle of Changsha ended in a Chinese victory.
- The Germans launched Operation Southeast Croatia, a counter-insurgency operation in the southeast portion of the Independent State of Croatia.
- The British cargo ship Empire Bay was bombed and sunk off Middlesbrough by a Dornier Do 217.
- German submarine U-93 was depth charged and sunk by the British destroyer HMS Hesperus between Portugal and the Azores.
- German submarine U-577 was depth charged and sunk by Fairey Swordfish aircraft in the Mediterranean northwest of Mersa Matruh.
- German submarine U-123 surfaced so close to New York Harbor that the rides at Coney Island could be seen silhouetted against the evening sky. Captain Reinhard Hardegen expected the U.S. east coast to be blacked out after more than a month at war and was surprised to see the glow in the sky from Manhattan's millions of lights.
- Field Marshal Wilhelm Ritter von Leeb insisted he either be relieved of command or given freedom to direct his forces as he wanted. Hitler chose the former.
- The ninth Pan-American Conference opened in Rio de Janeiro.
- Mahatma Gandhi named Jawaharlal Nehru as his successor.
- President Roosevelt sent a letter to baseball commissioner Kenesaw Mountain Landis saying that baseball should continue in wartime. "I honestly feel that it would be best for the country to keep baseball going", Roosevelt wrote. "There will be fewer people unemployed and everybody will work longer hours and harder than ever before. And that means that they ought to have a chance for recreation and for taking their minds off their work even more than before."
- German submarine U-605 was commissioned.

== January 16, 1942 (Friday) ==
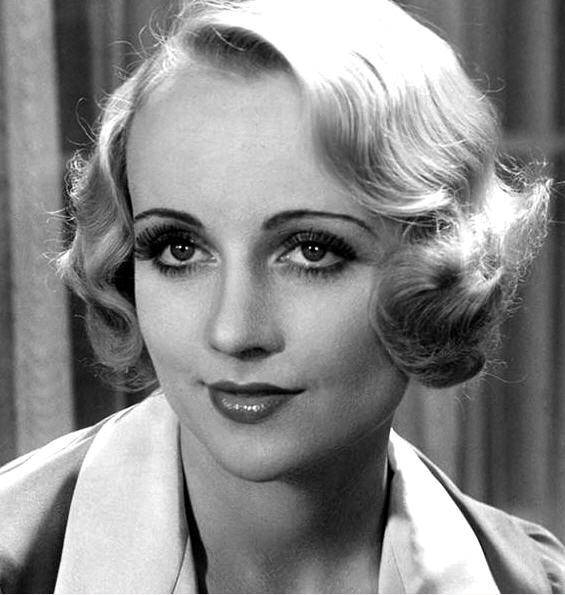
Movie star Carole Lombard, killed with 21 others in crash of TWA Flight 3

- TWA Flight 3 crashed into a cliff on Potosi Mountain in Nevada shortly after takeoff during a passenger flight to Burbank, California. All 19 passengers and 3 crew aboard were killed, including the actress Carole Lombard and her mother.
- Georg Lindemann replaced Georg von Küchler as commander of the German 18th Army.
- In the Battle of Muar in Malaya, the Japanese 5th Infantry Division crossed the Muar River and captured Muar itself.
- President Roosevelt signed Executive Order 9024, creating the War Production Board.
- British Prime Minister Winston Churchill became the first world leader to cross the Atlantic Ocean by plane, following the end of the Arcadia Conference First in Washington with U.S. President Franklin Roosevelt. Churchill had arrived in arrived in Washington, D.C. on December 22 after crossing in the ship HMS Duke of York.
- Born: René Angélil, record producer, talent manager and husband of Celine Dion, in Montreal, Canada (d. 2016)
- Died:
  - Prince Arthur, Duke of Connaught and Strathearn, 91, British royal and 10th Governor General of Canada;
  - Carole Lombard, 33, American film actress (died in TWA Flight 3 crash)

== January 17, 1942 (Saturday) ==
- The last Axis troops at Halfaya Pass surrendered. Erwin Rommel had now lost 32 percent of his forces since Operation Crusader began.
- The British destroyer HMS Gurkha was torpedoed and sunk off Sidi Barrani by German submarine U-133.
- Japanese submarine I-60 was forced to the surface and sunk in the Sunda Strait by the destroyer HMS Jupiter.
- British destroyer HMS Matabele was torpedoed and sunk in the Arctic Sea by German submarine U-454.
- Born: Muhammad Ali, born Cassius Clay, boxing champion, in Louisville, Kentucky (d. 2016)
- Died: Walther von Reichenau, 57, German field marshal (heart attack)

== January 18, 1942 (Sunday) ==
- The Battle at Borodino Field ended in Soviet victory.
- The Red Army began the Vyazma airborne operation, an airborne landing in the rear of German lines during the Battles of Rzhev.
- Japanese forces captured Tavoy, Burma.
- The Dutch cargo ship Bantam was torpedoed and sunk in the Banda Sea by the Japanese submarine I-121.
- Died: James P. Parker, 86, United States Navy officer

== January 19, 1942 (Monday) ==
- An Axis convoy docked at Tripoli providing Rommel with 55 new panzers, 20 armoured cars, and a large quantity of fuel, food and ammunition. Rommel immediately began planning a new offensive.
- President Roosevelt approved the Manhattan Project.
- The German 11th Army recaptured Feodosia.
- The ocean liner RMS Lady Hawkins was torpedoed and sunk in the North Atlantic by German submarine U-66.
- United States VIII Bomber Command was established.
- Born: Michael Crawford, actor, comedian and singer, in Salisbury, England

== January 20, 1942 (Tuesday) ==
- Senior Nazi officials met at the Wannsee Conference to agree on the implementation of the Final Solution, whereby Jews in German-occupied territories would be deported to Poland and systematically murdered in extermination camps.
- The Soviet 4th Shock Army took Toropets while the West Front captured Mozhaysk from the German 4th Army. Gotthard Heinrici replaced Ludwig Kübler as the commander of the 4th Army that same day.
- The Norwegian cargo ship MV Eidsvold (1934) was torpedoed and sunk at Flying Fish Cove, Christmas Island by the Japanese submarine Japanese submarine I-159.
- The American submarine S-36 ran aground on the Taka Bakang Reef in the Makassar Strait and was scuttled the following day.
- The Australian coal hulk SS Westralia was bombed and sunk by the Japanese in Simpson Harbour.
- Rogers Hornsby was elected to the Baseball Hall of Fame. Hornsby was the only player inducted between 1939 and 1945.

== January 21, 1942 (Wednesday) ==
- Rommel began his counteroffensive in North Africa, taking the enemy by complete surprise.
- Over 100 Japanese warplanes conducted the first air attack on Rabaul on the island of New Britain in the Australian Territory of New Guinea.
- Japanese submarine I-124 was sunk by Australian corvettes at Beagle Gulf near Darwin. It was the first time a Japanese warship was sunk by the Royal Australian Navy.
- Sonderkommando Blaich: One Heinkel He 111 medium bomber raided the Free French-controlled Fort Lamy in French Equatorial Africa. The plane bombed the fort unchallenged but then ran low on fuel and had to make an emergency landing, leaving the crew stranded some 120 miles from their airstrip in southern Libya until a Junkers Ju 52 transport aircraft arrived a week later with fuel.
- German submarine U-409 was commissioned.
- Born:
  - Mac Davis, country musician, in Lubbock, Texas (d. 2020);
  - Martin Sharp, pop artist and underground cartoonist, in Bellevue Hill, New South Wales. Australia (d. 2013)

== January 22, 1942 (Thursday) ==
- The Battle of Muar ended in Japanese victory.
- The Japanese landed on Mussau Island.
- 5,300 Japanese troops commanded by Major General Tomitarō Horii steamed into Rabaul Harbor during the night.
- German submarine U-606 was commissioned.
- Died:
  - Louis Santop, 52, African-American baseball player and 2006 inductee to the Baseball Hall of Fame;
  - Walter Sickert, 81, German-born English Impressionist painter;
  - Reimond Tollenaere, 32, Belgian fascist and SS-Untersturmführer (killed by friendly fire in the Leningrad sector)

== January 23, 1942 (Friday) ==
- The Battle of Balikpapan began off Balikpapan in eastern Borneo.
- The New Guinea Campaign began with the start of the Battle of Rabaul.
- Operation Southeast Croatia ended with the Yugoslav Partisans' withdrawal.
- Japanese soldiers carried out the Parit Sulong Massacre in Johor, Malaya.
- The Spanish freighter SS Navemar was torpedoed and sunk in the Strait of Gibraltar by the Italian submarine Barbarigo.
- The American oiler USS Neches was torpedoed and sunk 120 nautical miles west of Pearl Harbor by the Japanese submarine I-72.
- Japanese troop transport MS Nana Maru was bombed and sunk by Dutch aircraft in the Makassar Strait.
- The three-act play Cafe Crown by Hy Kraft premiered at the Cort Theatre on Broadway.
- The war film Joan of Paris starring Michèle Morgan and Paul Henreid premiered in New York City.

== January 24, 1942 (Saturday) ==
- The Battle of Balikpapan ended in a Japanese victory on land but a tactical Allied victory at sea.
- German forces relieved an encirclement of the garrison at Sukhinichi.
- Peru broke off diplomatic relations with Germany, Italy and Japan.
- The British cargo ship Empire Wildebeeste was torpedoed and sunk in the Atlantic Ocean by German submarine U-596.
- The American submarine USS S-26 was accidentally rammed and sunk in the Gulf of Panama by the submarine chaser USS Sturdy. 46 men were lost.
- A committee assigned by President Roosevelt on December 18, 1941, to investigate the Pearl Harbor attack issued its report, putting the blame on Admiral Husband E. Kimmel and Lieutenant General Walter Short for failing to coordinate their defenses appropriately or taking measures reasonably required in the light of the warnings they had been given. Both men would receive death threats as a result of the report.
- German submarines U-218, U-440 and U-514 were commissioned.

== January 25, 1942 (Sunday) ==
- The Japanese landed at Lae, capital of New Guinea.
- During the Battle of Borneo, the Japanese 56th Mixed Infantry Group captured the seaport city of Balikpapan.
- The Japanese puppet regime in Thailand declared war on the Allies.
- Britain, New Zealand and South Africa declared war on Thailand.
- Uruguay severed diplomatic relations with Germany, Italy and Japan.
- The German destroyer Z8 Bruno Heinemann was sunk by naval mines off the coast of Belgium.
- The Kholm Pocket was formed when German troops were encircled by the Red Army around Kholm south of Leningrad.
- Australia ordered full mobilization.
- Born:
  - Carl Eller, American football player, in Winston-Salem, North Carolina;
  - Eusébio, footballer, in Lourenço Marques, Mozambique (d. 2014)

== January 26, 1942 (Monday) ==
- The Battle off Endau began as part of the Battle of Malaya.
- Japanese troops occupied the Anambas Islands in the South China Sea.
- The first American soldiers to land in the European theatre of operations disembarked at Belfast, Northern Ireland. Their arrival was kept a secret right up until the first ship docked.
- Born: Soad Hosny, actress and singer, in Bulaq, Cairo, Egypt (d. 2001)
- Died: Felix Hausdorff, 73, German mathematician

== January 27, 1942 (Tuesday) ==
- The Battle off Endau ended in Japanese victory. The British destroyer HMS Thanet was sunk.
- Japanese troops in Borneo occupied Singkawang.
- Hermann Göring visited Italy for high-level talks lasting through February 5.
- Japanese submarine I-73 was torpedoed and sunk 240 miles west of Midway Atoll by the USS Gudgeon. This marked the first time in the war that a United States Navy submarine sank an enemy warship.
- The British oil tanker Harpa struck a mine and sank in the Singapore Strait with the loss of 39 out of 40 crew.
- Born: Steve Wynn, American business mogul
- Died: Wilhelm Spies, 28, German Luftwaffe ace (shot down on the Eastern Front)

== January 28, 1942 (Wednesday) ==
- German and Italian forces recaptured Benghazi.
- The ninth Pan-American Conference adjourned after the representatives of 21 countries signed an agreement to sever diplomatic, financial and commercial relations with the Axis powers.
- Brazil and Paraguay broke off diplomatic relations with Germany, Italy and Japan.
- German submarine U-91 was commissioned.
- The Preston Sturges-directed comedy film Sullivan's Travels starring Joel McCrea and Veronica Lake was released.
- Died:
  - Lionel Nathan de Rothschild, 60, English banker and politician;
  - Tamaki Tokuyama, 38, Japanese baritone (complications from sepsis)

== January 29, 1942 (Thursday) ==
- Peru and Ecuador signed the Rio Protocol formally ending the Ecuadorian–Peruvian War.
- In the Battle of Borneo, Japanese troops captured Pontianak.
- The German 2nd Panzer Army withdrew from Sukhinichi after relieving the garrison there.
- The U.S. Coast Guard ship Alexander Hamilton was torpedoed and sunk near Reykjavík by the German submarine U-132.
- German submarine U-607 was commissioned.
- Vote of confidence in Churchill war ministry after a three-day debate, ending with 464 ayes and 1 no.

== January 30, 1942 (Friday) ==
- The Battle of Ambon began on the island of Ambon in the Dutch East Indies.
- Rommel retook Benghazi by noon. Just as he entered the city, he received a message from Benito Mussolini suggesting that he should launch an offensive to take Benghazi. Rommel sent back a curt response: "Benghazi already taken." 1,000 men of the 4th Indian Division were still trapped in the city and surrendered when it fell.
- Adolf Hitler made a speech in the Berlin Sportpalast on the ninth anniversary of the Nazis coming to power. He declared, "We are fully aware that this war can end only either in the extermination of the Teutonic peoples or in the disappearance of Jewry from Europe." Hitler predicted that "the outcome of this war will be the annihilation of Jewry."
- The United States Coast and Geodetic Survey ship Pathfinder was beached at Corregidor after taking indirect damage from Japanese bombing.
- Qantas Short Empire shootdown: A Short Empire flying boat airliner was shot down by Japanese aircraft off the coast of West Timor. 13 of the 18 passengers and crew were killed.
- The Irish government claimed that its neutrality was being violated by the American troop presence in Northern Ireland. An official statement declared that the United States had recognized a "Quisling government" in Northern Ireland by sending troops there and that the British were making a new attempt to force Ireland into the war on the side of the Allies.
- In the United States, the Emergency Price Control Act made the Office of Price Administration an independent agency.
- German submarine U-461 was commissioned.
- Born: Marty Balin, singer, songwriter and member of Jefferson Airplane and Jefferson Starship, in Cincinnati (d. 2018)
- Died: Frederick W. A. G. Haultain, 84, English-born Canadian lawyer, politician and judge

== January 31, 1942 (Saturday) ==
- The Malayan Campaign ended in a Japanese victory. The retreating British set off two explosions destroying the Johor–Singapore Causeway.
- The British destroyer Belmont was sunk off Newfoundland by German submarine U-82.
- The German cargo ship MV Spreewald was mistaken for a British ship, torpedoed and sunk north of the Azores by German submarine U-333.
- German submarine U-217 was commissioned.
- Born:
  - Daniela Bianchi, actress, in Rome, Italy;
  - Derek Jarman, director, stage designer and author, in Northwood, London, England (d. 1994)
