= Wolfpack Vorwärts =

Wolfpack of German U-Boats

Vorwärts (English : "Forwards") was a wolfpack of German U-boats that operated from 25 August to 26 September 1942, in the Battle of the Atlantic during World War II. They attacked several convoys, principally Convoy ON 127, sailing from Liverpool to New York, and sank fifteen ships for a total of 79,331 gross register tons (GRT), and damaged nine (81,141 GRT).

== U-boats, commanders and dates ==
- U-604, Horst Höltring, 25 August–1 September
- U-609, Klaus Rudloff, 25 August–1 September
- U-756, Klaus Harney, 25 August–1 September (sunk)
- U-409, Hanns-Ferdinand Massmann, 25 August–2 September
- U-659, Hans Stock, 25 August–11 September (damaged)
- U-92, Adolf Oelrich, 25 August–17 September
- U-411, Gerhard Litterscheid, 25 August–18 September
- U-91, Heinz Walkerling, 25 August–26 September
- U-407, Ernst-Ulrich Brüller, 25 August–26 September
- U-380, Josef Röther, 2–25 September
- U-404, Otto von Bülow, 2–26 September
- U-584, Joachim Deecke, 2–26 September
- U-594, Friedrich Mumm, 2–17 September
- U-608, Rolf Struckmeier, 2–15 September
- U-96, Hans-Jürgen Hellriegel, 3–25 September
- U-211, Karl Hause, 3–26 September
- U-218, Richard Becker, 4–15 September
- U-461, Wolf-Harro Stiebler, 16–20 September

== Ships hit by this Wolfpack ==
=== Abbekerk ===
Abbekerk, an unescorted 7,906-ton Dutch merchant ship en route from Port of Spain, Trinidad to Liverpool with 9,489 tons of sugar, general cargo and mail, was inspected by the Norwegian convoy escort HNoMS Eglantine about 15 nautical miles (28 km) south-east of Convoy ONS 122 at 13:40 on 24 August 1942. Soon after it was spotted by U-604 which was searching for the convoy. The U-boat pursued the ship for more than 12 hours before firing a spread of three torpedoes at 03:48 on 25 August. One struck the ship, which stopped. At 03:56 U-604 hit it again and the ship sank after two boiler explosions. All the crew except two managed to abandon ship in two lifeboats, which set sail for Ireland, and the 62 men were later picked up by HMS Wallflower.

=== Capira & Bronxville ===
At 10.05 hours on 31 August U-609 fired torpedoes at Convoy SC 97 and sank two ships. The first was Capira, a 5,625-ton merchant ship owned by United States Lines, but flagged in Panama. The ship, loaded with trucks, tractors, steel mats, bulldozers, and 250 bags of US mail, was struck in the engine room, which immediately flooded. The ship sank in 20 minutes, killing five of the crew, but 36 men and 13 armed guards escaped in lifeboats and rafts. Of these, 33 were soon picked up by the British rescue ship Perth, and the remaining 16 by a corvette. The second ship was Bronxville, a 4,663-ton Norwegian merchant ship carrying general cargo, including 531 tons of explosives. All 39 hands survived and were picked up by the British rescue ship Perth. The next day, 1 September, U-756 was sunk with all hands by depth charges from the corvette HMCS Morden.

=== Attack on Convoy ON 127 ===
Convoy ON 127 comprised 32 ships, escorted by the Canadian Escort Group C-4 consisting of the destroyers HMCS St. Croix and HMCS Ottawa, and four Flower-class corvettes; HMCS Amherst, HMCS Arvida, HMCS Sherbrooke, and HMS Celandine. It was first sighted on 9 September 1942 by U-584, which lost contact during the night, but U-96 sighted the convoy again around noon on the next day.

==== Elisabeth van Belgie, Sveve & F.J. Wolfe ====
Between 16:31 and 16:33 U-96 fired four torpedoes at four ships and hit three. The 4,241-ton Belgian merchant ship Elisabeth van Belgie sank with the loss of one man from its crew of 56. When Sveve, a 6,313-ton Norwegian tanker in Admiralty service as a Royal Fleet Auxiliary was hit the subsequent explosion destroyed bulkheads, opened holes on the starboard side, and wrecked the steering gear. With the ship immobile and flooding, the 37 crew and two gunners abandoned ship in four lifeboats. They were picked up within the hour by HMCS Sherbrooke, which then attempted to scuttle the wreck with shell fire. Eventually the ship was reboarded by four of the crew and four men from the corvette who succeeded in sinking her. The third ship hit, the 12,190-ton British tanker F.J. Wolfe was damaged, but able to continue with the convoy.

==== Empire Oil ====
U-659 attacked south-west of Iceland, at 21:10 on 10 September, and hit the 8,029-ton British tanker Empire Oil with two torpedoes, stopping her. All its crew of 53 survived, as the master, 12 crewmen and 6 gunners were picked up by HMCS St. Croix, and 29 crewmen and 5 gunners by HMCS Ottawa. At 01:47 the next day, U-584 sank the drifting Empire Oil with two more torpedoes. After her strike U-659 was counter-attacked by the convoy escorts and seriously damaged. It was forced to abort the patrol and returned to France.

==== Marit II ====
At 00:16 on 11 September U-404 fired three torpedoes and one hit the 7,417-ton Norwegian tanker Marit II. U-608 also fired torpedoes at 00:20 and claimed a hit. Marit II stopped, but after inspecting the damage, she continued and rejoined the convoy on 12 September. It was later repaired in New York and returned to service in February 1943.

==== Fjordaas ====
U-218 fired five torpedoes between 01:35 and 01:40 on 11 September, and struck the 7,361-ton Norwegian tanker Fjordaas on the port side amidships opening a 30-by-60-foot (9.1 by 18.3 m) hole. The crew abandoned ship in two lifeboats, but remained close by as the master, first mate and chief engineer inspected the damage. Its engines and steering gear were intact, so the crew boarded and managed to take her back to Glasgow, arriving on 15 September.

==== Delães ====
At 11:50 on 11 September U-96 attempted to stop the 415-ton neutral Portuguese three-masted fishing schooner Delães by firing three shots from her deck gun across its bow. U-96 then sank the vessel with shells when it did not stop. The Germans claimed to see no neutrality markings, that it had steered a suspicious course close to convoy ON 127, and believed they heard ASDIC signals from the ship. All 54 of the crew survived.

==== Hindanger ====
At 19:25 hours on 11 September the 4,884-ton Norwegian merchant ship Hindanger was torpedoed by U-584. One man was killed, and the rest of the crew of 41 abandoned ship. The survivors were picked up by HMCS Amherst, which reported that she sank the wreck with gunfire and a depth charge at 23:12. However, it is possible that the scuttling was unsuccessful, and the ship was actually sunk at 05:34 hours on 12 September by two torpedoes by U-608.

==== Daghild ====
At 06:17 on 12 September U-404 fired three torpedoes, and struck the 9,272-ton Norwegian tanker Daghild with one, making a hole 50-by-54-foot (15 by 16 m) in its side. However, she reached St. John's for repairs, and then proceeded to New York for further work.

==== Empire Moonbeam & Hektoria ====
At 01:05 on 12 September, U-211 fired torpedoes, and damaged two British ships; the 6,849-ton merchant ship Empire Moonbeam was hit once, and the 13,797-ton whale factory ship Hektoria twice. Both vessels were sunk by U-608 later that day. Hektoria was sunk at 03:51 with the loss of one crewman, while the master, 76 crewmen and eight gunners were picked up by HMCS Arvida. Empire Moonbeam was sunk at 04:59 with the loss of three of its crew, while the master, 44 crewmen, six gunners and one passenger were also picked up by Arvida.

==== Stone Street ====
At 14:36 on 13 September U-594 fired a spread of three torpedoes at the 6,131-ton merchant ship Stone Street, owned by the Waterman Steamship Corporation of Mobile, Alabama, but sailing under the Panamanian flag. The ship was about 12 nautical miles (22 km) from the main convoy having developed problems with its boilers. One torpedo hit the ship in the engine room, and she listed and finally sank at 15:50. The master, 39 crewmen and 12 armed guards abandoned ship in a lifeboat and raft. Eleven crewmen and two armed guards were lost. The U-boat surfaced and took the survivors on board to be questioned, and provided them with supplies of whiskey, food, cigarettes and matches before returning all but the master (who was kept as a prisoner) to their lifeboats. They were picked up on 19 September by the merchant ship Irish Larch.

==== HMCS Ottawa ====
At 02:05 on 14 September U-91 fired two torpedoes at a destroyer and observed a hit. Then they saw another destroyer, made a full circle, and fired another torpedo at 02:15, which hit amidships and caused the ship to explode and sink immediately. They thought that they had sunk two destroyers, but in fact it was HMCS Ottawa, which was hit twice. Only 67 of its crew of 181 survived.

By now though the convoy was within range of aircraft from Newfoundland and the escorts were reinforced by the destroyers HMCS Annapolis and HMS Witch, forcing the U-boats break off their attacks and disperse.

=== Olaf Fostenes ===
At 09:21 on 18 September, the unescorted 2,994-ton Norwegian merchant ship Olaf Fostenes was hit by one of two torpedoes fired by U-380 on her starboard side. Another torpedo struck on its port side at 11:20 and sank it without loss. The crew of 36 abandoned ship in two lifeboats. The U-boat surfaced and asked for the master, but were told that he had been lost. The survivors set sail for Newfoundland, were spotted by an aircraft on 26 September, and soon picked up by HMS Firedrake.

=== Esso Williamsburg ===
On 18 September at 01:16, about 500 nautical miles (930 km) south of Cape Farewell, Greenland, U-211 sighted the unescorted 11,237-ton American tanker Esso Williamsburg loaded with 110,043 barrels (17,495.4 m^{3}) of Navy special fuel oil en route from Aruba to Reykjavík. The U-boat fired two torpedoes at the tanker, but missed, and then lost contact due to very poor visibility. U-211 eventually reacquired her target, and at 00:26 on 23 September, fired a torpedo which struck its amidships, causing a violent explosion which set the ship on fire. Ten minutes later, another torpedo was fired but missed. At 01:05, a third torpedo struck the tanker on the starboard side amidships, engulfing the entire ship in flames. The tanker broke in two and U-211 left the scene.

=== New York and HMS Veteran ===
At 23:57 on 25 September U-96 fired two torpedoes at Convoy RB-1 south-east of Cape Farewell, and both hit the 4,989-ton passenger ship New York. At 01.25 on 26 September, U-91 sank New York with a single torpedo. Thirteen of her crew of 64 were picked up by the destroyer HMS Veteran, which itself was torpedoed by U-404 at 10:36 the same day, and sank immediately, killing all 237 on board.
