= German submarine U-584 =

German World War II submarine

History

Nazi Germany
- Name: U-584
- Ordered: 8 January 1940
- Builder: Blohm & Voss, Hamburg
- Yard number: 560
- Laid down: 1 October 1940
- Launched: 26 June 1941
- Commissioned: 21 August 1941
- Fate: Sunk on 31 October 1943 in the North Atlantic in position 49°14′N 31°55′W, by depth charges from US Avenger aircraft.

General characteristics
- Class & type: Type VIIC submarine
- Displacement: 769 tonnes (757 long tons) surfaced; 871 t (857 long tons) submerged
- Length: 67.10 m (220 ft 2 in) o/a; 50.50 m (165 ft 8 in) pressure hull
- Beam: 6.20 m (20 ft 4 in) o/a; 4.70 m (15 ft 5 in) pressure hull
- Draught: 4.74 m (15 ft 7 in)
- Installed power: 2,800–3,200 PS (2,100–2,400 kW; 2,800–3,200 bhp) (diesels); 750 PS (550 kW; 740 shp) (electric)
- Propulsion: 2 shafts; 2 × diesel engines; 2 × electric motors
- Speed: 17.7 knots (32.8 km/h; 20.4 mph) surfaced; 7.6 knots (14.1 km/h; 8.7 mph) submerged
- Range: 8,500 nmi (15,700 km; 9,800 mi) at 10 knots (19 km/h; 12 mph) surfaced; 80 nmi (150 km; 92 mi) at 4 knots (7.4 km/h; 4.6 mph) submerged
- Test depth: 230 m (750 ft); Crush depth: 250–295 m (820–968 ft)
- Complement: 4 officers, 40–56 enlisted
- Armament: 5 × 53.3 cm (21 in) torpedo tubes (4 bow, 1 stern); 14 × torpedoes or 26 TMA mines; 1 × 8.8 cm (3.46 in) deck gun (220 rounds); 1 x 2 cm (0.79 in) C/30 AA gun

Service record
- Part of: 5th U-boat Flotilla; 21 August – 30 November 1941; 1st U-boat Flotilla; 1 December 1941 – 31 October 1943
- Identification codes: M 05 347
- Commanders: Kptlt. Joachim Deecke; 21 August 1941 – 20 December 1942; Kptlt. Kurt Nölke (acting); 20 December 1942 – 11 February 1943; Kptlt. Joachim Deecke; 12 February – 31 October 1943
- Operations: 10 patrols: 1st patrol: 27 November – 20 December 1941; 2nd patrol: 25 December 1941 – 11 January 1942; 3rd patrol: 23 January – 20 February 1942; 4th patrol: a. 28 February – 14 March 1942; b. 29 – 30 April 1942; 5th patrol: 5 – 16 May 1942; 6th patrol: 25 May – 22 July 1942; 7th patrol: 24 August – 10 October 1942; 8th patrol: 30 December 1942 – 11 February 1943; 9th patrol: 23 March – 24 May 1943; 10th patrol: 2 September – 31 October 1943
- Victories: 3 merchant ships sunk (18,478 GRT); 1 warship sunk (206 tons)

German submarine U-584 was a Type VIIC U-boat built for Nazi Germany's Kriegsmarine for service during World War II. She was laid down on 1 October 1940 by Blohm & Voss, Hamburg as yard number 560, launched on 26 June 1941 and commissioned on 21 August 1941 under Kapitänleunant Joachim Deecke.

== Design and construction ==
German Type VIIC submarines were preceded by the shorter Type VIIB submarines. U-584 had a displacement of 769 tonnes (757 long tons) when at the surface and 871 tonnes (857 long tons) while submerged. She had a total length of 67.10 m (220 ft 2 in), a pressure hull length of 50.50 m (165 ft 8 in), a beam of 6.20 m (20 ft 4 in), a height of 9.60 m (31 ft 6 in), and a draught of 4.74 m (15 ft 7 in). The submarine was powered by two Germaniawerft F46 four-stroke, six-cylinder supercharged diesel engines producing a total of 2,800 to 3,200 metric horsepower (2,060 to 2,350 kW; 2,760 to 3,160 shp) for use while surfaced, two Brown, Boveri & Cie GG UB 720/8 double-acting electric motors producing a total of 750 metric horsepower (550 kW; 740 shp) for use while submerged. She had two shafts and two 1.23 m (4 ft) propellers. The boat was capable of operating at depths of up to 230 metres (750 ft).

The submarine had a maximum surface speed of 17.7 knots (32.8 km/h; 20.4 mph) and a maximum submerged speed of 7.6 knots (14.1 km/h; 8.7 mph). When submerged, the boat could operate for 80 nautical miles (150 km; 92 mi) at 4 knots (7.4 km/h; 4.6 mph); when surfaced, she could travel 8,500 nautical miles (15,700 km; 9,800 mi) at 10 knots (19 km/h; 12 mph). U-584 was fitted with five 53.3 cm (21 in) torpedo tubes (four fitted at the bow and one at the stern), fourteen torpedoes, one 8.8 cm (3.46 in) SK C/35 naval gun, 220 rounds, and a 2 cm (0.79 in) C/30 anti-aircraft gun. The boat had a complement of between forty-four and sixty.

U-584 was one of 12 Type VIIIC submarines ordered from Blohm & Voss on 8 January 1940, and was laid down at their Hamburg shipyard on 1 October 1940, as yard number 560. The submarine was launched on 26 June 1941 and commissioned on 21 August that year.

== Service history ==
The boat's career began with training at 5th U-boat Flotilla on 21 August 1941, followed by active service on 1 December 1941 as part of the 1st Flotilla for the remainder of her service. In 10 patrols she sank three merchant ships, for a total of 18,478 gross register tons (GRT) and one warship of 206 tons.

=== Arctic operations ===
On 27 November 1941, U-584 left Kiel on her first patrol, arriving at Neidenfjord in the far north of Norway on 20 December 1941. U-584 was one of four U-boats deployed to the far north of Norway in an attempt to attack Arctic convoys carrying supplies to the Soviet Union. On 25 December 1941, U-584 left on her next patrol, joining the patrol group Ulan operating south of Bear Island against convoys PQ 7A and PQ 8. On 10 January 1942, U-584 sank the Soviet coastal submarine M-175. U-584 returned to Kirkenes on the next day. The submarine set out on a third patrol on 23 January 1942, returning to port on 20 February. U-584 left Kirkenes on her fourth patrol on 28 February 1942, and was deployed in a patrol line against Convoy PQ 12, but the four submarines had no success, and U-584 returned to Germany after the patrol, arriving at Hamburg on 14 March 1942.

=== North Atlantic ===
On 5 May 1942, U-584 left Kiel for occupied France, arriving at her new base of Brest on 16 May, suffering mechanical defects during the trip. On 25 May 1942, the submarine left Brest for a special mission as part of Operation Pastorius. On 18 June, she landed a 4-man saboteur team at Ponte Vedra Beach, just south of Jacksonville, Florida. This was one of two teams landed within a week of each other on the US east coast; the other team came aboard U-202. The saboteurs were quickly captured, and six of the eight men, including all four landed by U-584, were executed. After landing the saboteurs, U-584 patrolled off Cape Hatteras. On 22 June, the submarine sighted two tankers. Engine troubles prevented an attack being made one the first, while none of six fired at the second hit their target. On 27 June, U-584 spotted a convoy, attacking an escort with two torpedoes which missed. The submarine refuelled from U-460 on her return trip, arriving back at Brest on 22 July.

On 24 August 1942, U-584 left Brest on her next patrol to the North Atlantic. On 31 August, she joined patrol group Stier, west of Ireland, which on 4 September joined up with the Vorwärts group. On 9 September, U-584 sighted the westbound Convoy ON 127, with her sighting allowing Vorwärts' submarines to be directed against the convoy. On 11 September, U-584 torpedoed and sank the British tanker Empire Oil, which had been torpedoed by U-659 a few hours earlier and abandoned by her crew. On the evening of 11 September, U-584 avoided the defensive screen of the convoy and torpedoed the Norwegian merchant ship Hindanger, which was scuttled by the corvette HMCS Amherst. In total, seven merchant ships and one destroyer were sunk from ON 127. U-584 refuelled from the tanker submarine U-461 on about 20 September, before being directed against Convoy RB1, consisting of several Great Lakes steamers heading to Britain. While U-584 had no success, three steamers and a destroyer from the convoy were sunk in total. U-584 left for France on 1 October, arriving at Brest on 10 October 1942.

U-584 left on her next patrol to the North Atlantic on 30 December 1942, joining patrol group Falke, which was directed against several convoys, but failed to find them. On 19 January 1943, Falke was spilt to two groups, with U-584 joining Landsknecht group operating west of Ireland, which was broken up after achieving no success on 28 January. U-584 joined group Hartherz operating west of Gibraltar on 4 February, which was disbanded on 8 February, with U-584 returning to Brest on 11 February. The submarine lest Brest again on 23 March 1943, and joined Löwenherz group operating south east of Greenland. While the group was sent against Convoy HX 231, U-584 had no success against it. On 10 March, U-584 joined a new patrol group, Lerche, south east of Cape Farewell. On 11 March, U-584 sighted Convoy HX 232, and shadowed it, her sighting bring up three more U-boats from Lerche, which sank three merchant ships. After refuelling from U-487, U-584 joined a new patrol group, Specht north of the Azores on 20 March, but this was unsuccessful, and on 3 May the submarine joined group Fink. On 4–5 May, Fink was deployed against Convoy ONS 5, and on 5 May, U-584 encountered a group of stragglers from the convoy. The submarine fired a spread of four torpedoes, one of which hit and sank the American steamer SS West Madaket. (Note: U-584's commander claimed to have sunk a second ship in this attack, but this claim appears to be incorrect.) U-582 then joined group Elbe east of Newfoundland, but had no more success, and after refuelling from U-119 on about 16 May, set course for France, reaching Brest on 25 May 1942.

The submarine left Brest on its next, and final, patrol to the Atlantic on 2 September 1943. By now, U-boats bound for the Atlantic were under orders to remain on the surface if spotted by aircraft, and to fight off any attacks using their anti-aircraft armament. On 7 September, U-584 was attacked by an aircraft from 407 Squadron, RCAF, but escaped undamaged. The submarine joined patrol group Leuthen, operating south-south-west of Iceland, and after U-270 sighted a westbound convoy on 19 September, the group was ordered to attack the convoy. The convoy was the combined Convoys ONS 18 and ON 202, which had been ordered to merge by Western Approaches Command. It consisted of 68 merchant ships, escorted by 21 escorts. On the night of 20/21 September, U-584 attacked the Canadian corvette Chambly with an acoustic torpedo, but although a hit was claimed, the torpedo exploded in the corvette's wake, and Chambly was unharmed. By the time the battle ended on 23 September, German claims amounted to 12 escorts sunk and 3 more probably sunk, and 9 merchant ships sunk with 2 more damaged. In fact, three escorts and six merchant ships were sunk, at a cost of three U-boats sunk and three more damaged sufficiently that they had to abort their patrol. U-584 joined a new patrol group, Rossbach, on 27 September, but while the group was directed against several convoys, it mode no contact, and after 9 October, U-584, now short of fuel, headed south to refuel. Attempts to rendezvous with the tanker submarine U-488 failed, and U-584 was instead ordered to refuel from U-41. On 31 October, the two submarines met and fuel was being transferred to U-584 when the two submarines were spotted by a Grumman Avenger from the American escort carrier Card. The Avenger shadowed the submarines while calling up for reinforcements, and when two further Avengers arrived, U-91 dived with U-584 initially remained on the surface. When the Avengers then attacked, U-584 attempted to dive, but two Mark 24 homing torpedoes were dropped, each of which hit the submarine, sinking U-584 with no survivors at location 49°14′N 31°55′W.

=== Wolfpacks ===
U-584 took part in 16 wolfpacks, namely:

- Ulan (25 December 1941 – 10 January 1942)
- Stier (29 August – 2 September 1942)
- Vorwärts (2 – 26 September 1942)
- Luchs (27 – 29 September 1942)
- Letzte Ritter (29 September – 1 October 1942)
- Falke (4 – 19 January 1943)
- Landsknecht (19 – 28 January 1943)
- Hartherz (3 – 7 February 1943)
- Löwenherz (1 – 10 April 1943)
- Lerche (10 – 15 April 1943)
- Specht (21 April – 4 May 1943)
- Fink (4 – 6 May 1943)
- Elbe (7 – 10 May 1943)
- Elbe 1 (10 – 14 May 1943)
- Leuthen (15 – 24 September 1943)
- Rossbach (24 September – 6 October 1943)

== Summary of raiding history ==
Date	Ship Name	Nationality	Tonnage (Note: Merchant ship tonnages are in gross register tons. Military vessels are listed by tons displacement.)	Fate
10 January 1942	M-175	Soviet Navy	206	Sunk
11 September 1942	Empire Oil	United Kingdom	8,029	Sunk
11 September 1942	Hindanger	Norway	4,884	Sunk
5 May 1943	West Madaket	United States	5,565	Sunk
