= Convoy ON 127 =

Convoy during naval battles of the Second World War

- Part of Battle of the Atlantic
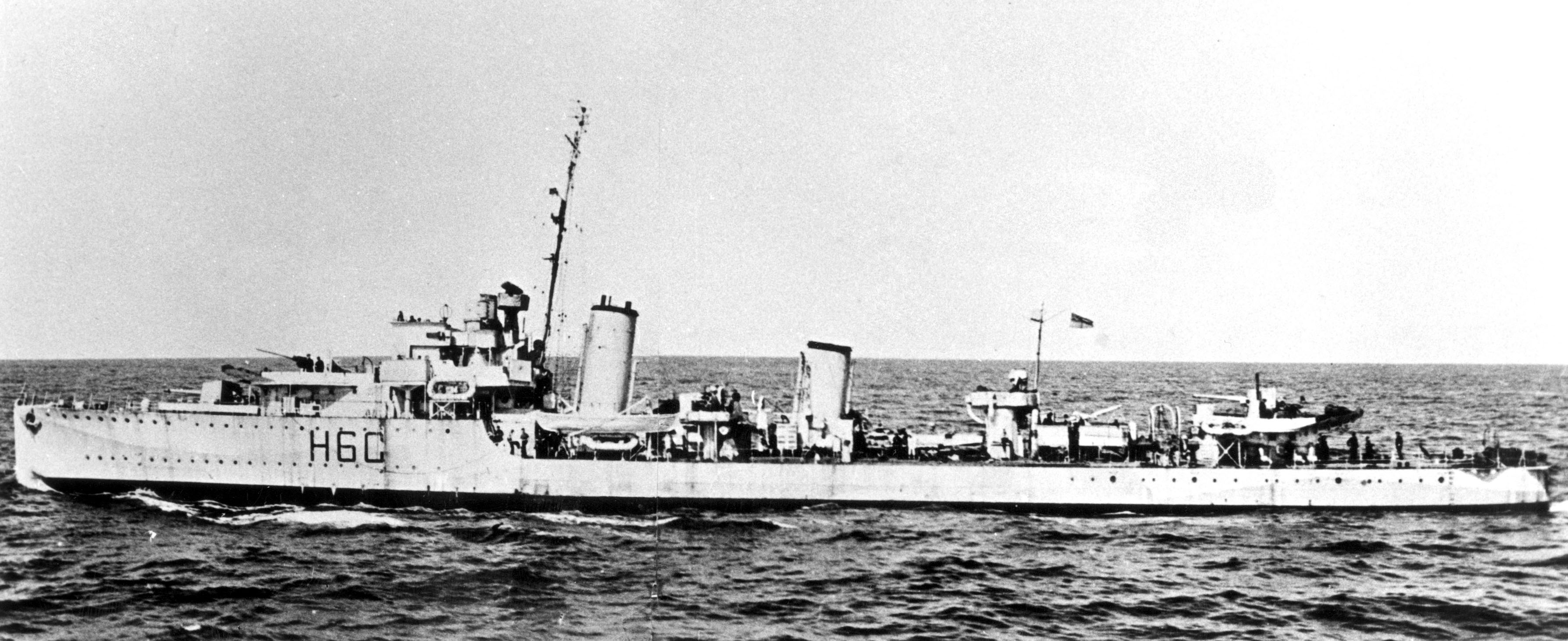
- HMCS Ottawa
Date	9–14 September 1942
Location	North Atlantic
Result	German victory

Belligerents
United Kingdom; Canada	Germany

Commanders and leaders
RADM Sir E O Cochrane KBE; LCDR A.H. "Dobby" Dobson RCNR	Admiral Karl Dönitz

Strength
35 freighters 4 destroyers 4 corvettes	13 submarines

Casualties and losses
6 freighters sunk (44,113GRT); 24 killed/drowned 1 destroyer sunk 114 killed/drowned	None

Convoy ON 127 was a trade convoy of merchant ships during the second World War. It was the 127th of the numbered series of ON convoys Outbound from the British Isles to North America and the only North Atlantic trade convoy of 1942 or 1943 where all U-boats deployed against the convoy launched torpedoes. The ships departed Liverpool on 4 September 1942 and were met at noon on 5 September by the Royal Canadian Navy Mid-Ocean Escort Force Group C-4 consisting of the River-class destroyer Ottawa and the Town-class destroyer St. Croix with the Flower-class corvettes Amherst, Arvida, Sherbrooke, and Celandine. St. Croix's commanding officer, acting Lieutenant Commander A. H. "Dobby" Dobson RCNR, was the senior officer of the escort group. The Canadian ships carried type 286 meter-wavelength radar but none of their sets were operational. Celandine carried Type 271 centimeter-wavelength radar. None of the ships carried HF/DF high-frequency direction finding sets.

== Background ==
As western Atlantic coastal convoys brought an end to the second happy time, Admiral Karl Dönitz, the Befehlshaber der U-Boote (BdU) or commander in chief of U-Boats, shifted focus to the mid-Atlantic to avoid aircraft patrols. Although convoy routing was less predictable in the mid-ocean, Dönitz anticipated that the increased numbers of U-boats being produced would be able to effectively search the area with the advantage of intelligence gained through B-Dienst decryption of British Naval Cypher Number 3. However, only 20 percent of the 180 trans-Atlantic convoys sailing from the end of July 1942 until the end of April 1943 lost ships to U-boat attack.

== Initial contact ==
Wolf pack Vorwarts was forming about 500 miles west of Ireland as the convoy left Liverpool. U-91, U-92, U-96, U-211, U-218, U-380, U-404, U-407, U-411, U-584, U-594, U-608, and U-659 formed a search line across the convoy's path just beyond the range of land-based aircraft. U-584 reported the convoy on 9 September, but lost contact that evening.

== 10 September ==
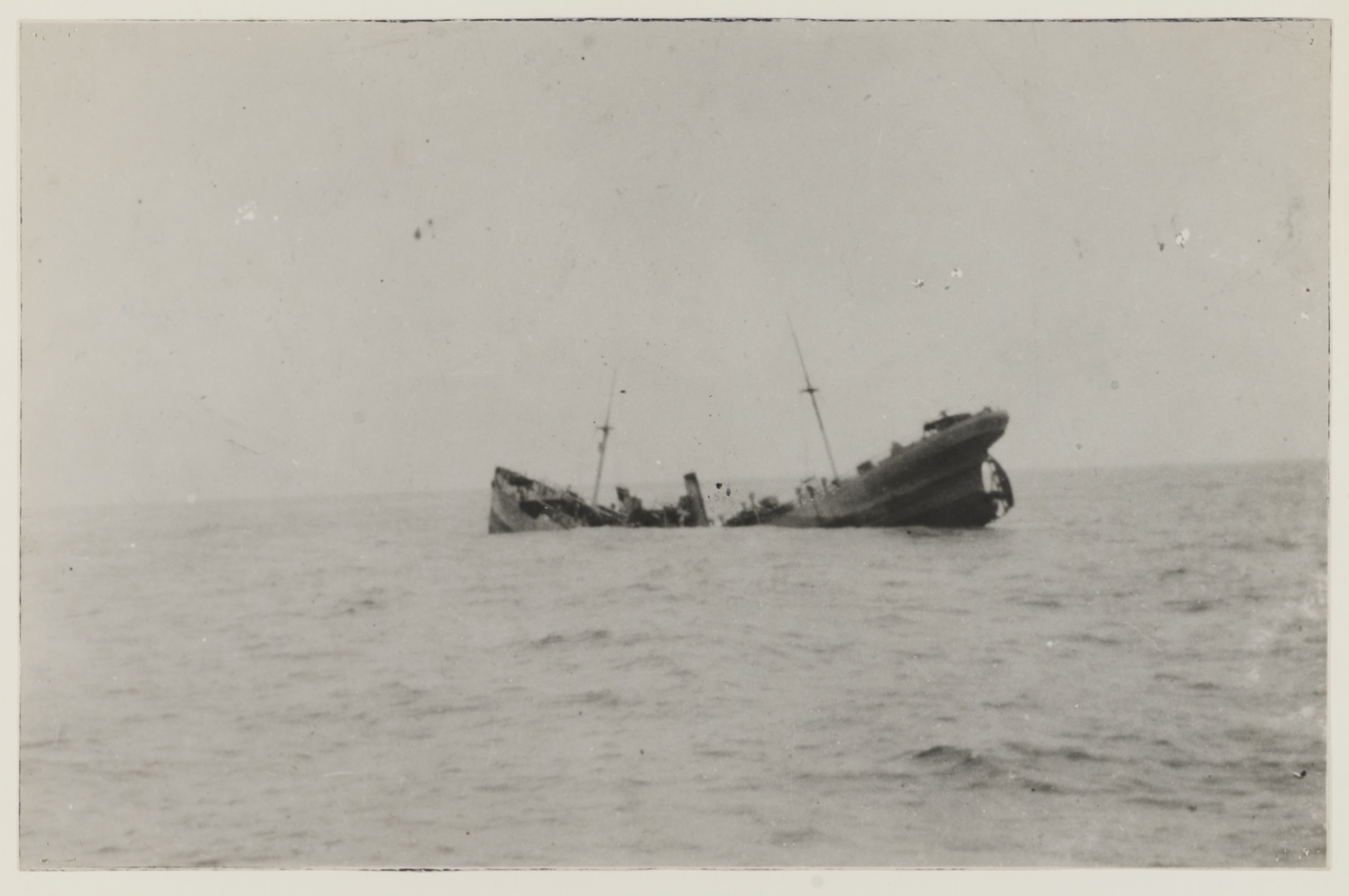
Elisabeth van België

U-96 regained contact on 10 September and torpedoed the Norwegian tanker Svene, the tanker F.J.Wolfe and the Belgian freighter Elisabeth van België in a single submerged daylight attack. Sherbrooke fell back to aid the torpedoed ships while St. Croix, Ottawa, and Celandine searched unsuccessfully for U-96. F.J.Wolfe was able to regain its station with the convoy. Ottawa continued to patrol astern of the convoy after St. Croix and Celandine resumed their normal patrol stations.

A coordinated night attack on the convoy began with U-659 torpedoing the British tanker Empire Oil on the evening of 10 September. St. Croix made SONAR contact immediately prior to the attack and Celandine, Ottawa, and St. Croix searched for U-659 after the attack. St. Croix and Ottawa fell back to rescue 23 of the stricken tanker's crew of 41. U-404 torpedoed the tanker Marit II, U-608 launched torpedoes which missed the convoy, U-218 torpedoed the tanker Fjordaas, and U-92 and U-594 launched torpedoes which missed the convoy before Ottawa, St. Croix, and Celandine rejoined the convoy. Sherbrooke remained astern of the convoy aiding the ships torpedoed by U-96, and rescued all but one of the crew of the sinking Svene and Elisabeth van Belgie. The remaining escorts counter-attacked, and depth charge damage forced U-659 and U-218 to return to port. Both Marit II and Fjordaas were able to regain their stations in the convoy. Empire Oil was later sunk astern of the convoy by U-584.

== 11 September ==
None of the escorts' RADAR sets were functional on 11 September. U-584 torpedoed the Norwegian Hindanger in a submerged daylight attack while St. Croix investigated a visual sighting six miles distant. Amherst fell back and rescued all but one of Hindanger's crew. A B-24 Liberator patrol bomber of No. 120 Squadron RAF prevented further daylight attacks on 11 September but U-96 sank a 415-ton Portuguese sailing trawler by gunfire in the vicinity of the convoy. In coordinated night attacks, U-380 missed with a salvo of four torpedoes, U-211 torpedoed the British whale factory ship Hektoria and freighter Empire Moonbeam, U-92 missed Ottawa with four torpedoes and U-404 torpedoed the tanker Daghild before Amherst and Sherbrooke rejoined the convoy. Daghild maintained station in the convoy and Arvida rescued all but four of the 140 crewmen from Hektoria and Empire Moonbeam before those ships were sunk astern of the convoy by U-608.

== Parting shots ==
Excellent visibility on 12 September allowed a close forward screen of four escorts to discourage U-boats sighted up to 7 miles away. U-407 and U-594 launched torpedoes unsuccessfully that night. U-594 sank the straggling Stone Street as the convoy came within range of Canadian Canso patrol bombers from Botland, Newfoundland on 13 September. The escort was reinforced at dusk by the Town-class destroyer HMCS Annapolis and the V and W-class destroyer HMS Witch from the Newfoundland-based Western Local Escort Force (WLEF). Both U-91 and U-411 launched torpedoes unsuccessfully while U-91 torpedoed the Canadian River-class destroyer HMCS Ottawa in the pre-dawn hours of 14 September. Ottawa sank with 114 of its crew. The remainder of the convoy reached New York City on 20 September 1942.

== Ships in convoy ==
Name	Nationality	Dead	Tonnage (GRT)	Cargo	Notes
Athelduchess (1929)	United Kingdom		8,940		Destination New York City; carried convoy commodore Rear Admiral Sir E O Cochrane KBE
Bayano (1917)	United Kingdom		6,815		Destination Halifax
Bohemian Club (1921)	United States		6,906		
Boston City (1920)	United Kingdom		2,870	China clay & mail	Veteran of convoy SC 94; Destination New York City; survived this convoy, convoy SC 104 & convoy SC 122
British Endurance (1936)	United Kingdom		8,406		Destination New York City
British Tradition (1942)	United Kingdom		8,443		Destination New York City
Clausina (1938)	United Kingdom		8,083		Destination New York City
Daghild (1927)	Norway		9,272		Torpedoed, but survived to be sunk 5 months later in convoy SC 118
Domby (1932)	United Kingdom		5,582		Destination New York City
Egda (1939)	Norway		10,050		Veteran of convoy HX 79; Destination New York City
El Mirlo (1930)	United Kingdom		8,092		Destination New York City
Elisabeth van Belgie (1909)	Belgium	1	4,241	In ballast	Sunk by U-96 10 Sept
Empire Lytton (1942)	United Kingdom		9,807		Reached New York City and was sunk 4 months later in Convoy TM 1
Empire Moonbeam (1941)	United Kingdom	3	6,849	In ballast	Veteran of convoy SC 94; sunk by U-211 & U-608 12 Sept
Empire Oil (1941)	United Kingdom	18	8,029	In ballast	Sunk by U-659 & U-584 11 Sept
Empire Sailor (1926)	United Kingdom		6,140	General cargo	Destination Halifax; carried convoy vice commodore Capt H J Woodward DSO RN
Empire Thackeray (1942)	United Kingdom		2,865		Destination Halifax
F J Wolfe (1932)	United Kingdom		12,190		Damaged by U-96 10 Sept; reached St. John's, Newfoundland 16 Sept
Fjordaas (1931)	Norway		7,361		Returned to Clyde; damaged by U-218 11 Sept
G C Brovig (1930)	Norway		9,718		Destination New York City
Hektoria (1899)	United Kingdom	1	13,797	In ballast	Veteran of convoy ON 67; sunk by U-211 & U-608 12 Sept
Heranger (1930)	Norway		4,877		Destination New York City
Hindanger (1929)	Norway	1	4,884	In ballast	Sunk by U-584 11 Sept
Laurits Swenson (1930)	Norway		5,725		Romped
Liberty Glo (1919)	United States		4,979		Destination Halifax
Marit II (1922)	Norway		7,417		Damaged by U-404 11 Sept; reached St. John's, Newfoundland
Modavia (1927)	United Kingdom		4,858		Destination Halifax
Montevideo (1928)	Norway		4,639		Destination New York City; survived this convoy & convoy HX 228
Nanking (1924)	Sweden		5,931	8 passengers	Destination New York City
Pachesham (1920)	United Kingdom		6,090		Detached for St. John's, Newfoundland 15 Sept
Pan-Georgia (1919)	United States		8,197		Destination New York City
Stone Street (1922)	Panama		6,131		Detached with defects 12 Sept; sunk by U-594
Sveve (1930)	Norway	0	6,313	In ballast	Sunk by U-96 10 Sept
Vardefjell (1940)	Norway		8,316		Returned to Clyde with engine defects
Willemsplein (1910)	Netherlands		5,489	Coal	Veteran of convoy SC 94; Destination Halifax

== See also ==
- Convoy Battles of World War II
