= Empire Bay =

Empire Bay may refer to:

- SS Empire Bay, a collier built in 1940 and sunk by bombing on 15 January 1942
- Empire Bay, New South Wales
- A fictional city in the 2010 video game Mafia II
