= German submarine U-594 =

German World War II submarine

History

Nazi Germany
- Name: U-594
- Ordered: 16 January 1940
- Builder: Blohm & Voss, Hamburg
- Yard number: 570
- Laid down: 17 December 1940
- Launched: 3 September 1941
- Commissioned: 30 October 1941
- Fate: Sunk on 5 June 1943 in the North Atlantic in position 35°55′N 09°25′W, by depth charges from RAF Hudson.

General characteristics
- Class & type: Type VIIC submarine
- Displacement: 769 tonnes (757 long tons) surfaced; 871 t (857 long tons) submerged
- Length: 67.10 m (220 ft 2 in) o/a; 50.50 m (165 ft 8 in) pressure hull
- Beam: 6.20 m (20 ft 4 in) o/a; 4.70 m (15 ft 5 in) pressure hull
- Height: 9.60 m (31 ft 6 in)
- Draught: 4.74 m (15 ft 7 in)
- Installed power: 2,800–3,200 PS (2,100–2,400 kW; 2,800–3,200 bhp) (diesels); 750 PS (550 kW; 740 shp) (electric)
- Propulsion: 2 shafts; 2 × diesel engines; 2 × electric motors
- Speed: 17.7 knots (32.8 km/h; 20.4 mph) surfaced; 7.6 knots (14.1 km/h; 8.7 mph) submerged
- Range: 8,500 nmi (15,700 km; 9,800 mi) at 10 knots (19 km/h; 12 mph) surfaced; 80 nmi (150 km; 92 mi) at 4 knots (7.4 km/h; 4.6 mph) submerged
- Test depth: 230 m (750 ft); Crush depth: 250–295 m (820–968 ft)
- Complement: 4 officers, 40–56 enlisted
- Armament: 5 × 53.3 cm (21 in) torpedo tubes (four bow, one stern); 14 × torpedoes or 26 TMA mines; 1 × 8.8 cm (3.46 in) deck gun (220 rounds); 1 x 2 cm (0.79 in) C/30 AA gun

Service record
- Part of: 8th U-boat Flotilla; 30 October 1941 – 28 February 1942; 7th U-boat Flotilla; 1 March 1942 – 5 June 1943
- Identification codes: M 38 516
- Commanders: Kptlt. Dietrich Hoffmann; 30 October 1941 – 26 July 1942; Kptlt. Friedrich Mumm; 25 July 1942 – 5 June 1943
- Operations: 6 patrols: 1st patrol: 14 – 30 March 1942; 2nd patrol: 11 April – 25 June 1942; 3rd patrol: 4 August – 28 September 1942; 4th patrol: 30 December 1942 – 18 February 1943; 5th patrol: 23 March – 14 April 1943; 6th patrol: 23 May – 5 June 1943
- Victories: 2 merchant ships sunk (14,390 GRT)

German submarine U-594 was a Type VIIC U-boat built for Nazi Germany's Kriegsmarine for service during World War II. She was laid down on 17 December 1940 by Blohm & Voss, Hamburg as yard number 570, launched on 3 September 1941 and commissioned on 30 October 1941 under Kapitänleutnant Dietrich Hoffmann.

== Design ==
German Type VIIC submarines were preceded by the shorter Type VIIB submarines. U-594 had a displacement of 769 tonnes (757 long tons) when at the surface and 871 tonnes (857 long tons) while submerged. She had a total length of 67.10 m (220 ft 2 in), a pressure hull length of 50.50 m (165 ft 8 in), a beam of 6.20 m (20 ft 4 in), a height of 9.60 m (31 ft 6 in), and a draught of 4.74 m (15 ft 7 in). The submarine was powered by two Germaniawerft F46 four-stroke, six-cylinder supercharged diesel engines producing a total of 2,800 to 3,200 metric horsepower (2,060 to 2,350 kW; 2,760 to 3,160 shp) for use while surfaced, two Brown, Boveri & Cie GG UB 720/8 double-acting electric motors producing a total of 750 metric horsepower (550 kW; 740 shp) for use while submerged. She had two shafts and two 1.23 m (4 ft) propellers. The boat was capable of operating at depths of up to 230 metres (750 ft).

The submarine had a maximum surface speed of 17.7 knots (32.8 km/h; 20.4 mph) and a maximum submerged speed of 7.6 knots (14.1 km/h; 8.7 mph). When submerged, the boat could operate for 80 nautical miles (150 km; 92 mi) at 4 knots (7.4 km/h; 4.6 mph); when surfaced, she could travel 8,500 nautical miles (15,700 km; 9,800 mi) at 10 knots (19 km/h; 12 mph). U-594 was fitted with five 53.3 cm (21 in) torpedo tubes (four fitted at the bow and one at the stern), fourteen torpedoes, one 8.8 cm (3.46 in) SK C/35 naval gun, 220 rounds, and a 2 cm (0.79 in) C/30 anti-aircraft gun. The boat had a complement of between forty-four and sixty.

== Service history ==
The boat's career began with training at 8th U-boat Flotilla on 30 October 1941, followed by active service on 1 March 1942 as part of the 7th U-boat Flotilla for the remainder of her service.

In six patrols she sank two merchant ships, for a total of 14,390 gross register tons (GRT).

=== Convoy ON 127 ===
The convoy ON 127, westbound from the UK to New York, assembled in the North Channel during 5 September 1942. The convoy comprised 32 ships, many of them oil tankers in ballast. The ocean escort, C4, was largely Canadian.

Soon after sunset the convoy set off in eight columns of four. 600 miles out into the Atlantic Wolf Pack Vorwärts waited in ambush. Of the 13 U-boats, very few of their commanders had combat experience or success to their name; Friedrich Mumm in U-594 was a complete novice.

Initial contact came on the evening of 9 September 1942, and by this time Vorwärts had been reinforced with additional boats from Stier. The weather was fine with good visibility but the convoy escorts had been forewarned by the Admiralty about the presence of the enemy.

On 12 September, both U-407 and U-594 launched torpedoes unsuccessfully that night. U-594 eventually sank the straggling 6,131 GRT American-owned Panamanian-flagged steamer Stone Street with a single torpedo which struck the engine room on the port side.

When U-594 surfaced she accidentally capsized the Stone Street’s lifeboat, but the men were taken aboard, questioned and provided with supplies of whiskey and food, then released; except for the master who was retained as a POW.

=== Fate ===
U-594 was sunk on 5 June 1943 in the North Atlantic in position 35°55′N 09°25′W, by depth charges from an RAF Hudson bomber. All hands were lost.

=== Wolfpacks ===
U-594 took part in six wolfpacks, namely:

- Blücher (14 – 28 August 1942)
- Stier (29 August – 2 September 1942)
- Vorwärts (2 – 17 September 1942)
- Jaguar (10 – 31 January 1943)
- Pfeil (1 – 9 February 1943)
- Löwenherz (1 – 10 April 1943)

== Summary of raiding history ==
Date	Ship Name	Nationality	Tonnage (GRT)	Fate
13 September 1942	Stone Street	Panama	6,131	Sunk
26 January 1943	Kollbjørg	Norway	8,259	Sunk

== Bibliography ==
- Busch, Rainer; Röll, Hans-Joachim (1999). German U-boat commanders of World War II : a biographical dictionary. Translated by Brooks, Geoffrey. London, Annapolis, Md: Greenhill Books, Naval Institute Press. ISBN 1-55750-186-6.
- Busch, Rainer; Röll, Hans-Joachim (1999). Der U-Boot-Krieg, 1939-1945: Deutsche U-Boot-Verluste von September 1939 bis Mai 1945 [German U-boat losses from September 1939 to May 1945] (in German). Vol. IV. Hamburg, Berlin, Bonn: Mittler. ISBN 3-8132-0514-2.
- Edwards, Bernard (1996). Dönitz and the Wolf Packs - The U-boats at War. Cassell. pp. 105, 110. ISBN 0-304-35203-9.
- Gröner, Eric; Jung, Dieter; Maass, Martin (1991). German Warships 1815-1945: U-boats and Mine Warfare Vessels. Vol. 2. Translated by Thomas, Keith; Magowan, Rachel. London: Conway Maritime Press. ISBN 0-85177-593-4.
- Sharpe, Peter (1998). U-Boat Fact File. Great Britain: Midland Publishing. ISBN 1-85780-072-9.
