= German submarine U-608 =

German World War II submarine

Coordinates: 46°30′N 03°08′W

History

Nazi Germany
- Name: U-608
- Ordered: 22 May 1940
- Builder: Blohm & Voss, Hamburg
- Yard number: 584
- Laid down: 27 March 1941
- Launched: 11 December 1941
- Commissioned: 5 February 1942
- Fate: Scuttled on 10 August 1944

General characteristics
- Class & type: Type VIIC submarine
- Displacement: 769 tonnes (757 long tons) surfaced; 871 t (857 long tons) submerged
- Length: 67.10 m (220 ft 2 in) o/a; 50.50 m (165 ft 8 in) pressure hull
- Beam: 6.20 m (20 ft 4 in) o/a; 4.70 m (15 ft 5 in) pressure hull
- Height: 9.60 m (31 ft 6 in)
- Draught: 4.74 m (15 ft 7 in)
- Installed power: 2,800–3,200 PS (2,100–2,400 kW; 2,800–3,200 bhp) (diesels); 750 PS (550 kW; 740 shp) (electric)
- Propulsion: 2 shafts; 2 × diesel engines; 2 × electric motors.
- Speed: 17.7 knots (32.8 km/h; 20.4 mph) surfaced; 7.6 knots (14.1 km/h; 8.7 mph) submerged
- Range: 8,500 nmi (15,700 km; 9,800 mi) at 10 knots (19 km/h; 12 mph) surfaced; 80 nmi (150 km; 92 mi) at 4 knots (7.4 km/h; 4.6 mph) submerged
- Test depth: 230 m (750 ft); Crush depth: 250–295 m (820–968 ft)
- Complement: As U-441 : 4 officers, 40–56 enlisted; As U-flak 1 : 67 officers & ratings
- Armament: 5 × 53.3 cm (21 in) torpedo tubes (four bow, one stern); 14 × torpedoes or 26 TMA mines; 1 × 8.8 cm (3.46 in) deck gun (220 rounds); 1 x 2 cm (0.79 in) C/30 AA gun

Service record
- Part of: 5th U-boat Flotilla; 5 February – 31 August 1942; 6th U-boat Flotilla; 1 September 1942 – 10 August 1944
- Identification codes: M 30 340
- Commanders: Kptlt. Rolf Struckmeier; 5 February 1942 – 12 January 1944; Oblt.z.S. Wolfgang Reisener; 21 January – 10 August 1944
- Operations: 9 patrols: 1st patrol: 20 August – 24 September 1942; 2nd patrol: 20 October – 9 December 1942; 3rd patrol: 20 January – 29 March 1943; 4th patrol: 8 May – 18 July 1943; 5th patrol: a. 23 – 25 September 1943; b. 2 October – 28 November 1943; 6th patrol: 29 January – 3 April 1944; 7th patrol: 6 – 14 June 1944; 8th patrol: 22 – 23 July 1944; 9th patrol: 7 – 10 August 1944
- Victories: 4 merchant ships sunk (35,539 GRT); 1 warship sunk (291 tons)

German submarine U-608 was a Type VIIC U-boat of Nazi Germany's Kriegsmarine during World War II. During the Battle of the Atlantic, she was commanded by Kapitänleutnant Rolf Struckmeier as a unit of Wolfpack Vorwärts.

She was scuttled in the Bay of Biscay on 10 August 1944 after being attacked by an RAF Liberator aircraft with depth charges.

== Design ==
German Type VIIC submarines were preceded by the shorter Type VIIB submarines. U-608 had a displacement of 769 tonnes (757 long tons) when at the surface and 871 tonnes (857 long tons) while submerged. She had a total length of 67.10 m (220 ft 2 in), a pressure hull length of 50.50 m (165 ft 8 in), a beam of 6.20 m (20 ft 4 in), a height of 9.60 m (31 ft 6 in), and a draught of 4.74 m (15 ft 7 in). The submarine was powered by two Germaniawerft F46 four-stroke, six-cylinder supercharged diesel engines producing a total of 2,800 to 3,200 metric horsepower (2,060 to 2,350 kW; 2,760 to 3,160 shp) for use while surfaced, two BBC GG UB 720/8 double-acting electric motors producing a total of 750 metric horsepower (550 kW; 740 shp) for use while submerged. She had two shafts and two 1.23 m (4 ft) propellers. The boat was capable of operating at depths of up to 230 metres (750 ft).

The submarine had a maximum surface speed of 17.7 knots (32.8 km/h; 20.4 mph) and a maximum submerged speed of 7.6 knots (14.1 km/h; 8.7 mph). When submerged, the boat could operate for 80 nautical miles (150 km; 92 mi) at 4 knots (7.4 km/h; 4.6 mph); when surfaced, she could travel 8,500 nautical miles (15,700 km; 9,800 mi) at 10 knots (19 km/h; 12 mph). U-608 was fitted with five 53.3 cm (21 in) torpedo tubes (four fitted at the bow and one at the stern), fourteen torpedoes, one 8.8 cm (3.46 in) SK C/35 naval gun, 220 rounds, and a 2 cm (0.79 in) C/30 anti-aircraft gun. The boat had a complement of between forty-four and sixty.

== Fate ==
She was scuttled in the Bay of Biscay on 10 August 1944 after being attacked by an RAF Liberator aircraft with depth charges. The damaged boat surfaced unnoticed and was scuttled by her crew, which was rescued by HMS Wren six hours later suffering no losses.

=== Wolfpacks ===
U-608 took part in 19 wolfpacks, namely:

- Stier (29 August – 2 September 1942)
- Vorwärts (2 – 15 September 1942)
- Pfeil (1 – 9 February 1943)
- Neptun (18 February – 3 March 1943)
- Neuland (8 – 13 March 1943)
- Dränger (14 – 20 March 1943)
- Trutz (1 – 16 June 1943)
- Trutz 1 (16 – 29 June 1943)
- Geier 1 (30 June – 15 July 1943)
- Schlieffen (14 – 22 October 1943)
- Siegfried (22 – 27 October 1943)
- Siegfried 1 (27 – 30 October 1943)
- Jahn (31 October – 2 November 1943)
- Tirpitz 2 (2 – 8 November 1943)
- Eisenhart 7 (9 – 11 November 1943)
- Schill 2 (17 – 22 November 1943)
- Igel 2 (9 – 17 February 1944)
- Hai 1 (17 – 22 February 1944)
- Preussen (22 February – 14 March 1944)

== Summary of raiding history ==
| Date | Ship Name | Nationality | Tonnage (Note: Merchant ship tonnages are in gross register tons. Military vessels are listed by tons displacement.) | Fate |
|---|---|---|---|---|
| 12 September 1942 | Hektoria | United Kingdom | 13,797 | Sunk |
| 12 September 1942 | Empire Moonbeam | United Kingdom | 6,849 | Sunk |
| 16 November 1942 | Irish Pine | Ireland | 5,621 | Sunk |
| 8 February 1943 | Daghild | Norway | 9,272 | Sunk |
| 8 February 1943 | HMS LCT-2335 (Note: Being carried by Daghild.) | Royal Navy | 291 | Sunk |

== Bibliography ==
- Bishop, Chris (2006). Kriegsmarine U-boats 1939-45. London: Amber Books. ISBN 1904687962.
- Busch, Rainer; Röll, Hans-Joachim (1999a). German U-boat commanders of World War II : a biographical dictionary. Translated by Brooks, Geoffrey. London, Annapolis, Md: Greenhill Books, Naval Institute Press. ISBN 1-55750-186-6.
- Busch, Rainer; Röll, Hans-Joachim (1999b). Der U-Boot-Krieg, 1939-1945: Deutsche U-Boot-Verluste von September 1939 bis Mai 1945 [German U-boat losses from September 1939 to May 1945] (in German). Vol. IV. Hamburg, Berlin, Bonn: Mittler. ISBN 3-8132-0514-2.
- Edwards, Bernard (1996). Dönitz and the Wolf Packs - The U-boats at War. Cassell Military Classics. pp. 105, 107, 108, 148. ISBN 0-304-35203-9.
- Gröner, Eric; Jung, Dieter; Maass, Martin (1991). German Warships 1815-1945: U-boats and Mine Warfare Vessels. Vol. 2. Translated by Thomas, Keith; Magowan, Rachel. London: Conway Maritime Press. ISBN 0-85177-593-4.
