= German submarine U-119 =

U-119 may refer to one of the following German submarines:

- SM U-119, a Type UE II submarine launched in 1918 that served in World War I and was surrendered in 1918; became the French submarine René Audry
  - During World War I, Germany also had this submarine with a similar name:
    - SM UB-119, a Type UB III submarine launched in 1917 and sunk on 5 May 1918
- German submarine U-119 (1942), a Type XB submarine that served in World War II and was sunk on 24 June 1943
