= MV Harpa =

British oil tanker (1930–1942)

Coordinates: 1.25°N 104°E

History

United Kingdom
- Name: MV Harpa
- Operator: Anglo-Saxon Petroleum Company, London
- Builder: Hawthorn, Leslie & Co. Ltd., Hebburn
- Yard number: Build number 575
- Launched: 5 December 1930
- Identification: Call sign GTQK
- Fate: Sunk 27 January 1942

General characteristics
- Class & type: Oil tanker
- Tonnage: 3,007 GRT
- Length: 93.14 m (305.58 ft)
- Beam: 15.26 m (50.07 ft)
- Draught: 5.87 m (19.26 ft)
- Propulsion: Two 6-cylinder Hawthorn oil engines, twin screw
- Crew: 41 Merchant Navy plus 2 DEMS gunners

MV Harpa was an oil tanker of the Anglo-Saxon Petroleum Company (later Royal Dutch/Shell) and was in service with the British Merchant Navy during World War II.

== World War II ==
It was bombed on 22 December 1941 at the beginning of the Malayan Campaign at Port Swettenham, with the loss of 4 men.

The remains were buried at the site of what would later become the Cheras War Cemetery, Kuala Lumpur.

== Sinking ==
It was sunk by a British seamine in Main Strait, Singapore† en route to Batavia with a full cargo of aviation spirit on 27 January 1942 with the loss of 7 British officers, 2 Royal Navy DEMS gunners and 25 Chinese crew.

†Tom Simkins MBE, Chief Radio Officer of SS Pinna, stated the sinking to be in the Rhio Strait (now Riau Strait, between Batam and Bintan Islands).

== Sources ==
"Harpa and Pinna". Mercantile Marine. Archived from the original on 24 January 2013.

"Another Door Part 1: War in the Far East". BBC. Archived from the original on 19 April 2013.

"Naval Events, January 1942, Part 2 of 2, Thursday 15th – Saturday 31st". Naval History. Archived from the original on 4 September 2012.
