= HMCS Arvida =

Flower-class corvette

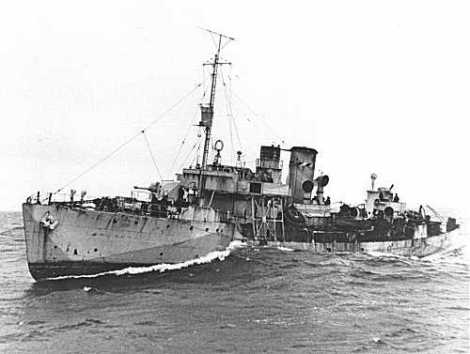
- HMCS Arvida

History

Canada
- Name: Arvida
- Namesake: Arvida, Quebec
- Ordered: 23 January 1940
- Builder: Morton Engineering & Dry Dock Co., Quebec City
- Laid down: 28 February 1940
- Launched: 21 September 1940
- Commissioned: 22 May 1941
- Decommissioned: 14 June 1945
- Identification: Pennant number: K113
- Honours and awards: Atlantic 1941–45
- Fate: Sold for mercantile use

History
- Name: La Ceiba; Rio Samo
- In service: 1950
- Out of service: 1954
- Fate: Scrapped in Spain, 1987

General characteristics
- Class & type: Flower-class corvette (original)
- Displacement: 950 long tons (970 t)
- Length: 205 ft 1 in (62.51 m) o/a
- Beam: 33 ft 1 in (10.08 m)
- Draught: 13 ft 5 in (4.09 m)
- Installed power: 2,750 ihp (2,050 kW)
- Propulsion: single shaft; 2 × Scotch boilers; 1 × 4-cylinder triple-expansion engine
- Speed: 16 knots (30 km/h; 18 mph)
- Range: 3,450 nmi (6,390 km; 3,970 mi) at 12 kn (22 km/h; 14 mph)
- Complement: 47
- Sensors & processing systems: 1 × SW1C or 2C radar; 1 × Type 123A or Type 127DV sonar
- Armament: 1 × BL 4 in (102 mm) Mk.IX single gun; 2 × .50 cal machine gun (twin); 2 × Lewis .303 cal machine gun (twin); 2 × Mk II depth charge throwers; 2 × depth charge rails with 40 depth charges; originally fitted with minesweeping gear, later removed

HMCS Arvida was a Flower-class corvette that served with the Royal Canadian Navy during the Second World War. She served primarily in the Battle of the Atlantic from 1941 to 1945 as a convoy escort. She was named for Arvida, Quebec. The vessel took part in three significant convoy battles ONS 92 in May 1942, ON 127 in September 1942 and SC 107 in November 1942, the last of which saw the removal of Canadian escorts from convoy duty for retraining. Following the war, the vessel was converted into a cargo ship and renamed La Ceiba and then Rio Samo. The ship was last registered in 1954 and was sold for scrap in 1987 in Spain.

== Design and description ==
Flower-class corvettes such as Arvida serving with the Royal Canadian Navy (RCN) in the Second World War were different from earlier and more traditional sail-driven corvettes. The Flower-class corvettes originated from a need that arose in 1938 to expand the Royal Navy following the Munich Crisis. A design request went out for a small escort for coastal convoys. Based on a traditional whaler-type design, the initial Canadian ships of the Flower class had a standard displacement of 950 long tons (970 t). They were 205 feet 1 inch (62.51 m) long overall with a beam of 33 feet 1 inch (10.08 m) and a maximum draught of 13 feet 5 inches (4.09 m). The initial 1939–1940 corvettes were powered by a four-cylinder vertical triple expansion engine powered by steam from two Scotch boilers turning one three-bladed propeller rated at 2,800 indicated horsepower (2,100 kW). The Scotch boilers were replaced with water-tube boilers in later 1939–1940 and 1940–1941 Programme ships. The corvettes had a maximum speed of 16 knots (30 km/h; 18 mph). This gave them a range of 3,450 nautical miles (6,390 km; 3,970 mi) at 12 knots (22 km/h; 14 mph). The vessels were extremely wet.

The Canadian Flower-class vessels were initially armed with a Mk IX BL 4-inch (102 mm) gun forward on a CP 1 mounting and carried 100 rounds per gun. The corvettes were also armed with a QF Vickers 2-pounder (40 mm, 1.6 in) gun on a bandstand aft, two single-mounted .303 Vickers machine guns or Browning 0.5-calibre machine guns for anti-aircraft defence and two twin-mounted .303 Lewis machine guns, usually sited on bridge wings. For anti-submarine warfare, they mounted two depth charge throwers and initially carried 25 depth charges. The corvettes were designed with a Type 123 ASDIC sonar set installed. The Flower-class ships had a complement of 47 officers and ratings. The Royal Canadian Navy initially ordered 54 corvettes in 1940 and these were fitted with Mark II Oropesa minesweeping gear used for destroying contact mines. Part of the depth charge rails were made portable so the minesweeping gear could be utilised.

=== Modifications ===
In Canadian service the vessels were altered due to experience with the design's deficiencies. The galley was moved further back in the ship and the mess and sleeping quarters combined. A wireless direction finding set was installed, and enlarged bilge keels were installed to reduce rolling. After the first 35–40 corvettes had been constructed, the foremast was shifted aft of the bridge and the mainmast was eliminated. Corvettes were first fitted with basic SW-1 and SW-2 CQ surface warning radar, notable for their fishbone-like antenna and reputation for failure in poor weather or in the dark. The compass house was moved further aft and the open-type bridge was situated in front of it. The ASDIC hut was moved in front and to a lower position on the bridge. The improved Type 271 radar was placed aft, with some units receiving Type 291 radar for air search. The minesweeping gear, a feature of the first 54 corvettes, was removed. Most Canadian Flower-class corvettes had their forecastles extended which improved crew accommodation and seakeeping. Furthermore, the sheer and flare of the bow was increased, which led to an enlarged bridge. This allowed for the installation of Oerlikon 20 mm (0.8 in) cannon, replacing the Browning and Vickers machine guns. Some of the corvettes were rearmed with Hedgehog anti-submarine mortars. The complements of the ships grew throughout the war rising from the initial 47 to as many as 104.

== Construction and career ==
Ordered on 23 January 1940 from Morton Engineering and Dry Dock Co. as part of the 1939–1940 Flower-class building program, Arvida was laid down on 28 February. She was launched on 21 September 1940 and commissioned at Quebec City on 22 May 1941.

After working up, Arvida was assigned to Sydney Force, the local escort force for Sydney, Nova Scotia in the Battle of the Atlantic in July 1941 and escorted coastal convoys until September. In September, she was reassigned to Newfoundland Command and was used as an ocean escort continuously until the end of 1943. During this time, she took in three major convoy battles, ONS 92 in May 1942, ON 127 in September 1942 and SC 107 in November 1942. During ONS 127 she rescued survivors from the sinking Canadian destroyer HMCS Ottawa which had been hit by two torpedoes. Convoy SC 107 was such a disaster that it contributed to Canadian warships being removed from service as ocean escorts for further training. The ship underwent the first of the modifications at Saint John, New Brunswick from January to April 1942 and then the second from December 1942 to March 1943.

In January 1943, the composition of the escort groups changed and Arvida was assigned to escort group C1 of the Mid-Ocean Escort Force. On 15 April 1943, Arvida, temporarily assigned to the American escort group A3 when the convoy they were escorting HX 223 was attacked by German U-boats. Only one cargo ship was lost in the ensuing battle. In late April 1943, Arvida was assigned to the new Canadian escort group C5, which had been created after the final American pullout of convoy escort duties. On its first mission escorting convoy ON 182, the transit was pushed further north to avoid large concentrations of U-boats. While escorting convoy ON 188 in mid-June 1943, Arvida was damaged by her own detonating depth charges. She spent a week repairing in Iceland.

From January to April 1944, Arvida had her forecastle extended at Baltimore, Maryland. Following the ship's reactivation, Arvida was assigned to the Western Local Escort Force as part of escort group W7. In August of that year Arvida was reassigned to group W2. December 1944 saw her transferred to group W8 with whom she would remain until the end of the war. For participation in the Battle of the Atlantic, Arvida was awarded the battle honour "Atlantic 1941–45".

=== Mercantile service ===
Arvida was paid off on 14 June 1945 at Sorel, Quebec. She was sold for mercantile purposes. The ship was converted to a cargo ship in 1950 with a gross register tonnage of 1,117 tons. She was in service in 1950 as La Ceiba under a Spanish flag. She was last registered on Lloyd's Register in 1953–1954. In 1957, she was renamed Rio Samo and broken up in Spain in 1987.
