= Foreign Claims Act =

U.S. federal law

The Foreign Claims Act, (10 U.S.C. § 2734-2736), or FCA, is a United States federal law enacted on January 2, 1942, that provides compensation to inhabitants of foreign countries for personal injury, death, or property damage caused by, or incident to noncombat activities of United States military personnel overseas. Although the U.S. Government's scope of liability under the FCA is broad, certain classes of claimants and certain types of claims are excluded from the statute’s coverage. Procedures for adjudicating an FCA claim are substantially different from the general procedural pattern for other types of claims against the government. Chapter VIII, part B, of the Judge Advocate General's Corps Manual prescribes the requirements for the investigation and adjudication of FCA claims.

== See also ==
- Solatium
