= German submarine U-380 =

German world war II submarine

History

Nazi Germany
- Name: U-380
- Ordered: 16 October 1939
- Builder: Howaldtswerke AG, Kiel
- Yard number: 11
- Laid down: 1 October 1940
- Launched: 5 November 1941
- Commissioned: 22 December 1941
- Fate: Sunk by US bombs on 11 March 1944

General characteristics
- Class & type: Type VII submarine
- Displacement: 769 tonnes (757 long tons) surfaced; 871 t (857 long tons) submerged; 1,070 t (1,053 long tons) total
- Length: 67.10 m (220 ft 2 in) total; 50.50 m (165 ft 8 in) pressure hull
- Beam: 6.20 m (20 ft 4 in) total; 4.70 m (15 ft 5 in) pressure hull
- Draught: 4.74 m (15 ft 7 in)
- Propulsion: Diesel-electric; 3,200 PS (2,354 kW; 3,156 shp) surfaced; 750 PS (552 kW; 740 shp) submerged
- Speed: 17.7 knots (32.8 km/h; 20.4 mph) surfaced; 7.66 knots (14.19 km/h; 8.81 mph) submerged
- Range: 13,700 nmi (25,400 km; 15,800 mi) at 10 knots (19 km/h; 12 mph) surfaced; 125 nmi (232 km; 144 mi) at 4 knots (7.4 km/h; 4.6 mph) submerged
- Complement: 44-52 men
- Armament: 5 × 53.3 cm (21 in) torpedo tubes (four bow, one stern); 14 × torpedoes; 1 × 8.8 cm (3.46 in) deck gun (220 rounds); 1 x 2 cm (0.79 in) C/30 AA gun

Service record
- Part of: 5th U-boat Flotilla; 22 December 1941 – 31 August 1942; 6th U-boat Flotilla; 1 September – 30 November 1942; 29th U-boat Flotilla; 1 December 1942 – 11 March 1944
- Identification codes: M 47 957
- Commanders: Kptlt. Josef Röther; 22 December 1941 – November 1943; Kptlt. Albrecht Brandi; December 1943 – 11 March 1944
- Operations: 11 patrols: 1st patrol: a. 4 – 11 August 1942; b. 22 August – 7 October 1942; 2nd patrol: 5 – 19 Nov 1942; 3rd patrol: 28 November – 23 December 1942; 5th patrol: 1 – 6 February 1943; 6th patrol: 10 March – 5 April 1943; 7th patrol: 5 – 16 May 1943; 8th patrol: 7 June – 6 July 1943; 9th patrol: 11 August – 7 September 1943; 10th patrol: 30 September – 11 October 1943; 11th patrol: 28 October – 11 November 1943; 12th patrol: 20 December 1943 – 21 January 1944
- Victories: 2 merchant ships sunk (14,063 GRT); 1 merchant ship total loss (7,178 GRT); 1 merchant ship damaged (7,191 GRT)

German submarine U-380 was a Type VIIC U-boat built for Nazi Germany's Kriegsmarine for service during World War II. Her wartime career consisted of 11 patrols and resulted in two ships sunk for 14,063 GRT, one ship damaged, and another of 7,178 GRT that was later declared a total loss.

== Design ==
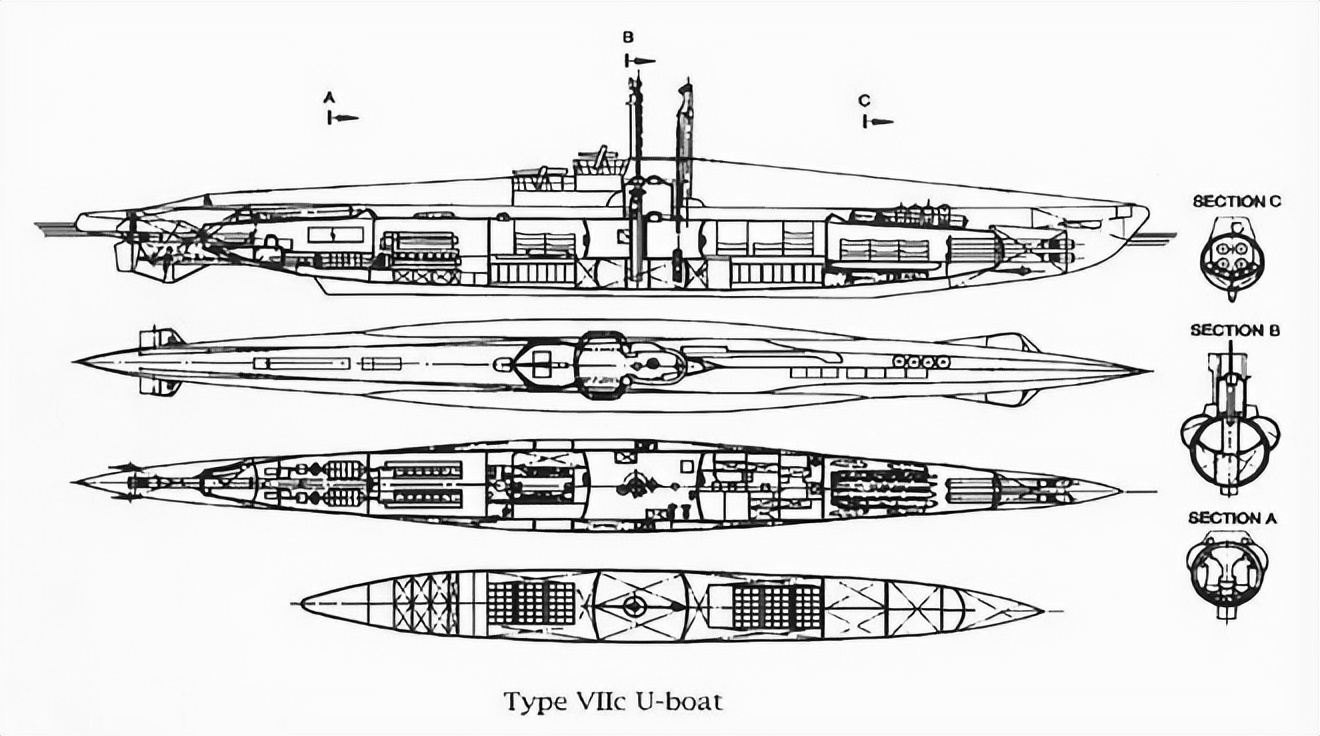
A cross-section of a Type VIIC submarine

German Type VIIC submarines were preceded by the shorter Type VIIB submarines. U-380 had a displacement of 769 tonnes (757 long tons) when at the surface and 871 tonnes (857 long tons) while submerged. She had a total length of 67.10 m (220 ft 2 in), a pressure hull length of 50.50 m (165 ft 8 in), a beam of 6.20 m (20 ft 4 in), a height of 9.60 m (31 ft 6 in), and a draught of 4.74 m (15 ft 7 in). The submarine was powered by two Germaniawerft F46 four-stroke, six-cylinder supercharged diesel engines producing a total of 2,800 to 3,200 metric horsepower (2,060 to 2,350 kW; 2,760 to 3,160 shp) for use while surfaced, two AEG GU 460/8–27 double-acting electric motors producing a total of 750 metric horsepower (550 kW; 740 shp) for use while submerged. She had two shafts and two 1.23 m (4 ft) propellers. The boat was capable of operating at depths of up to 230 metres (750 ft).

The submarine had a maximum surface speed of 17.7 knots (32.8 km/h; 20.4 mph) and a maximum submerged speed of 7.6 knots (14.1 km/h; 8.7 mph). When submerged, the boat could operate for 80 nautical miles (150 km; 92 mi) at 4 knots (7.4 km/h; 4.6 mph); when surfaced, she could travel 8,500 nautical miles (15,700 km; 9,800 mi) at 10 knots (19 km/h; 12 mph). U-380 was fitted with five 53.3 cm (21 in) torpedo tubes (four fitted at the bow and one at the stern), fourteen torpedoes, one 8.8 cm (3.46 in) SK C/35 naval gun, 220 rounds, and a 2 cm (0.79 in) C/30 anti-aircraft gun. The boat had a complement of between forty-four and sixty.

== Service history ==
U-380 was ordered by the Kriegsmarine on 16 October 1939. She was laid down just short of a year later at the Howaldtswerke yard in Kiel, on 1 October 1940. About thirteen months later, U-380 was launched in Kiel on 5 November 1941. She was formally commissioned into the Kriegsmarine later that year, on 22 December.

=== First patrol ===
U-380 experienced her first taste of war on her first patrol. While stalking convoy ON 127 on 12 September 1942 in the central Atlantic, the submarine was detected and attacked by the convoy's escorts resulting in the failure of one of her diesel engines. The damage was not severe enough to warrant aborting the patrol, but the U-boat broke off her attack. Her first strike against allied shipping would come less than a week later when she torpedoed and sank the unescorted Norwegian motor merchant Olaf Fostenes (2,994 GRT). All 36 men aboard the merchant survived this attack. The U-boat crew questioned the crew, asking for the ship's master; the mariners lied to the Germans, telling them the master had been killed in the attack. U-380 returned to port on 7 October 1942.

Her next patrol, which lasted only 15 days, was still successful. On 11 November 1942, U-380 torpedoed and sank the 11,069 GRT Dutch passenger liner Nieuw Zeeland. The ship had recently participated in the North African landings of Operation Torch and was returning from that operation. 15 of the 256 souls aboard perished; the remainder were picked up by convoy escorts and later landed at Gibraltar.

Two uneventful patrols followed. It was not until 15 March 1943, while on her fifth patrol, that the U-boat had her next success. The British Liberty Ship Ocean Seaman, traveling with convoy ET-14, was torpedoed and badly damaged. Dead in the water, the stricken vessel was taken in tow and beached the next day near Algiers. She was declared a total loss.

On 10 May 1943, U-380 rescued five German soldiers who were escaping from Tunisia in a small boat. She landed them at La Spezia on 16 May.

A further two uneventful Mediterranean sorties followed. The veteran submarine departed on her eighth patrol on 11 August 1943, again prowling the Mediterranean for enemy shipping. Success arrived on 23 August when the 7,191 GRT American Liberty Ship Pierre Soulé was struck in the rudder by a single torpedo from U-380. The resulting explosion bodily lifted the ship out of the water. Although her rudder was destroyed and the engines and propeller shaft badly damaged, the stricken merchantman was taken in tow by the USS Nauset to Bizerte. She was repaired in dry dock at Taranto and returned to service.

Despite undertaking three further patrols, U-380 had no further successes during her career.

=== Loss ===
On 11 March 1944, while in the harbor at Toulon, U-380 along with U-410 were sunk by US bombs during an air raid. One man of the crew, Maschinenmaat Jonny Christoph, was killed aboard U-380.

=== Wolfpacks ===
U-380 took part in four wolfpacks, namely:

- Stier (29 August – 2 September 1942)
- Vorwärts (2 – 25 September 1942)
- Delphin (5 – 12 November 1942)
- Wal (12 – 15 November 1942)

== Summary of raiding history ==
Date	Ship Name	Nationality	Tonnage (GRT)	Fate
18 September 1942	Olaf Fostenes	Norway	2,994	Sunk
11 November 1942	Nieuw Zeeland	Netherlands	11,069	Sunk
15 March 1943	Ocean Seaman	United Kingdom	7,178	Total loss
23 August 1943	Pierre Soulé	United States	7,191	Damaged

== Bibliography ==
- Busch, Rainer; Röll, Hans-Joachim (2001). Deutsche U-Boot-Erfolge von September 1939 bis Mai 1945 [German U-boat successes from September 1939 to May 1945]. Der U-Boot-Krieg, 1939-1945 (in German). Vol. III. Hamburg: Mittler & Sohn. ISBN 3813205134.
- Busch, Rainer; Röll, Hans-Joachim (1999). German U-boat commanders of World War II : a biographical dictionary. Translated by Brooks, Geoffrey. London, Annapolis, Md: Greenhill Books, Naval Institute Press. ISBN 1-55750-186-6.
- Busch, Rainer; Röll, Hans-Joachim (1999). Deutsche U-Boot-Verluste von September 1939 bis Mai 1945 [German U-boat losses from September 1939 to May 1945]. Der U-Boot-Krieg (in German). Vol. IV. Hamburg, Berlin, Bonn: Mittler. ISBN 3-8132-0514-2.
- Edwards, Bernard (1996). Dönitz and the Wolf Packs - The U-boats at War. Cassell Military Classics. pp. 105, 108. ISBN 0-304-35203-9.
- Gröner, Erich; Jung, Dieter; Maass, Martin (1991). U-boats and Mine Warfare Vessels. German Warships 1815–1945. Vol. 2. Translated by Thomas, Keith; Magowan, Rachel. London: Conway Maritime Press. ISBN 0-85177-593-4.
- Kemp, Paul (1999). U-Boats Destroyed - German Submarine Losses in the World Wars. London: Arms & Armour. ISBN 1-85409-515-3.
- Röll, Hans-Joachim; Besler, Michael (2014) [2011]. U 380 "Das Kleeblattboot" [U 380 "The Cloverleaf Boat"] (in German) (2nd ed.). Würzburg, Germany: Flechsig. ISBN 978-3-8035-0020-5.
