= HMCS Amherst =

Flower-class corvette

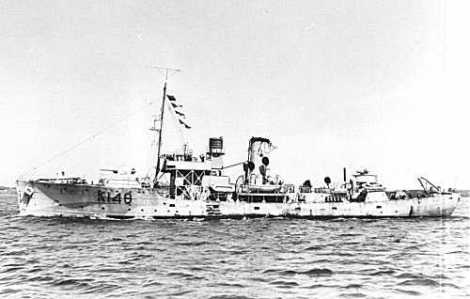
- HMCS Amherst

History

Canada
- Name: Amherst
- Namesake: Amherst, Nova Scotia
- Ordered: 24 January 1940
- Builder: Saint John Dry Dock and Shipbuilding Co. Ltd., Saint John
- Laid down: 23 May 1940
- Launched: 4 December 1940
- Commissioned: 5 August 1941
- Out of service: paid off 16 July 1945
- Identification: Pennant number: K148
- Honours and awards: Atlantic 1941–45, Gulf of St. Lawrence 1944
- Fate: Sold to Venezuelan navy

Venezuela
- Name: Carabobo
- Acquired: 1945
- Out of service: 1945
- Fate: Wrecked Gulf of St. Lawrence 1945

General characteristics
- Class & type: Flower-class corvette (original)
- Displacement: 950 long tons (970 t)
- Length: 205 ft 1 in (62.51 m) o/a
- Beam: 33 ft 1 in (10.08 m)
- Draught: 13 ft 5 in (4.09 m)
- Propulsion: single shaft; 2 × Scotch boilers; 1 × 4-cylinder triple-expansion reciprocating steam engine; 2,750 ihp (2,050 kW)
- Speed: 16 knots (30 km/h; 18 mph)
- Range: 3,450 nmi (6,390 km; 3,970 mi) at 12 kn (22 km/h; 14 mph)
- Complement: 47
- Sensors & processing systems: 1 × SW1C or 2C radar; 1 × Type 123A or Type 127DV sonar
- Armament: 1 × BL 4 in (102 mm) Mk.IX single gun; 2 × .50 cal machine gun (twin); 2 × Lewis .303 cal machine gun (twin); 2 × Mk.II depth charge throwers; 2 × depth charge rails with 40 depth charges; originally fitted with minesweeping gear, later removed

HMCS Amherst was a Flower-class corvette of the Royal Canadian Navy. She served primarily in the Battle of the Atlantic on convoy protection duty during the Second World War. She was named for Amherst, Nova Scotia. The ship was laid down at Saint John Dry Dock and Shipbuilding Co. Ltd. in Saint John, New Brunswick, on 23 May 1940 and launched on 3 December later that year. Amherst was commissioned on 5 August 1941 and served in the Battle of the Atlantic and Battle of the St. Lawrence, earning battle honours for both actions. After the war, the ship was decommissioned and sold to Venezuelan Navy in 1945 and renamed Carabobo. However, while en route to Venezuela, the ship was wrecked in the Gulf of St. Lawrence that same year.

== Design and description ==
Flower-class corvettes like Amherst serving with the Royal Canadian Navy (RCN) during the Second World War were different from earlier and more traditional sail-driven corvettes. The Flower-class corvettes originated from a need that arose in 1938 to expand the Royal Navy following the Munich Crisis. A design request went out for a small escort for coastal convoys. Based on a traditional whaler-type design, the initial Canadian ships of the Flower class had a standard displacement of 950 long tons (970 t). They were 205 feet 1 inch (62.51 m) long overall with a beam of 33 feet 1 inch (10.08 m) and a maximum draught of 13 feet 5 inches (4.09 m). The initial 1939–1940 corvettes were powered by a four-cylinder vertical triple expansion engine powered by steam from two Scotch boilers turning one three-bladed propeller rated at 2,800 indicated horsepower (2,100 kW). The Scotch boilers were replaced with water-tube boilers in later 1939–1940 and 1940–1941 Programme ships. The corvettes had a maximum speed of 16 knots (30 km/h; 18 mph). This gave them a range of 3,450 nautical miles (6,390 km; 3,970 mi) at 12 knots (22 km/h; 14 mph). The vessels were extremely wet.

The Canadian Flower-class vessels were initially armed with a Mk IX BL 4-inch (102 mm) gun forward on a CP 1 mounting and carried 100 rounds per gun. The corvettes were also armed with a QF Vickers 2-pounder (40 mm, 1.6 in) gun on a bandstand aft, two single-mounted .303 Vickers machine guns or Browning 0.5-calibre machine guns for anti-aircraft defence and two twin-mounted .303 Lewis machine guns, usually sited on bridge wings. For anti-submarine warfare, they mounted two depth charge throwers and initially carried 25 depth charges. The corvettes were designed with a Type 123 ASDIC sonar set installed. The Flower-class ships had a complement of 47 officers and ratings. The Royal Canadian Navy initially ordered 54 corvettes in 1940 and these were fitted with Mark II Oropesa minesweeping gear used for destroying contact mines. Part of the depth charge rails were made portable so the minesweeping gear could be utilised.

=== Modifications ===
In Canadian service the vessels were altered due to experience with the design's deficiencies. The galley was moved further back in the ship and the mess and sleeping quarters combined. A direction-finding set was installed and enlarged bilge keels were installed to reduce rolling. After the first 35–40 corvettes had been constructed, the foremast was shifted aft of the bridge and the mainmast was eliminated. Corvettes were first fitted with basic SW-1 and SW-2 CQ surface warning radar, notable for their fishbone-like antenna and reputation for failure in poor weather or in the dark. The compass house was moved further aft and the open-type bridge was situated in front of it. The ASDIC hut was moved in front and to a lower position on the bridge. The improved Type 271 radar was placed aft, with some units receiving Type 291 radar for air search. The minesweeping gear, a feature of the first 54 corvettes, was removed. Most Canadian Flower-class corvettes had their forecastles extended which improved crew accommodation and seakeeping. Furthermore, the sheer and flare of the bow was increased, which led to an enlarged bridge. This allowed for the installation of Oerlikon 20 mm (0.8 in) cannon, replacing the Browning and Vickers machine guns. Some of the corvettes were rearmed with Hedgehog anti-submarine mortars. The complements of the ships grew throughout the war rising from the initial 47 to as many as 104.

== Construction and career ==
Ordered from Saint John Dry Dock and Shipbuilding Co. Ltd. in Saint John, New Brunswick as part of the 1939–1940 Flower-class building programme, Amherst was laid down on 23 May 1940 and launched on 3 December later that year. She was commissioned on 5 August 1941 at Saint John and then sent to Halifax, Nova Scotia to undergo work ups.

=== War service ===
After her commissioning Amherst was sent on convoy escort duty from 22 August 1941 until her first refit in 1943. The ship was assigned to Newfoundland Force and on 11 October 1941, the escort for convoy SC 49 was taken over by the Canadian escort group 4.1.16, of which Amherst was a member. During their escort, the convoy was rerouted to the north of convoy SC 48 and their ongoing battle. On 22 October, escort of the convoy was handed over to the British escort group EG 4 at the Mid-Ocean Meeting Point (MOMP). On 6 November, Amherst's escort group took over the escort of convoy ONS 32 at the MOMP, first rerouting to the south to avoid the German U-boats before arriving without incident. This was followed by four more uneventful convoy escort missions, SC 56, ONS 44, SC 63 and ONS 58 taking the ship into 1942.

In August 1942, Amherst was made a member of the Mid-Ocean Escort Force (MOEF) escort group C-4. The unit was escorting convoy ON 127 when it is sighted by a U-boat on 9 September. The wolfpack "Vorwärts" moved to intercept and engaged the convoy on 10 September. Hampered by faulty radar, the escort is overwhelmed, losing the destroyer HMCS Ottawa during the battle. The battle lasts until 14 September, out of the 32 freighters in the convoy, 10 were sunk, plus a trawler that was near the convoy, comprising 79,263 gross register tons (GRT). During the battle, Amherst was fired upon by the German submarine U-92 but all of the torpedoes missed while recovering the survivors of SS Hindanger. Amherst and sister ship Sherbrooke detached from the convoy on 15 September, escorting four merchant vessels that had been damaged in the battle to St. John's, Newfoundland. Amherst and C-4 then escorted convoy SC 101 at the end of the month, losing only one ship that had straggled behind the main body of the convoy to the U-boats.

On 16 October 1942, C-4 was escorting convoy ON 137 which was spotted by German forces. However, the convoy evaded the wolfpacks "Panther" and "Wotan" without loss. At the end of October, C-4 was deployed on escort duty, this time with convoy SC 107, consisting of 42 ships. However, Amherst had recently had a change in command, and two of the group were only on passage to the United Kingdom. First contact between the opposing forces took place on 30 October, but was lost until 2 November. The wolfpack "Velichen" was placed across SC 107's path. Amherst engaged several U-boats. During his first encounter the commanding officer, Lieutenant Louis Audette, went up to the crowsnest to direct fire down on the surfaced U-boat. The next night during her attempt to sink another submarine her ASDIC lost power and she lost contact. During the same convoy, a member of the crew earned a British Empire Medal for helping save three stranded crew from a burning vessel. However, the convoy lost 15 ships, comprising 82,777 GRT.

In January 1943, C-4 was deployed to escort convoy HX 224, which was discovered by Axis forces on 1 February. The convoy was attacked and three merchant ships were sunk comprising 24,823 GRT. Later that month C-4 was sent to Londonderry for training, before sailing on 2 March to escort eight troopships sailing as convoy KMF 10B to Algiers. They passed through the Strait of Gibraltar uneventfully, but came under attack by German Focke-Wulf Fw 200 Condor aircraft, damaging one of the troopships. The rest of the convoy was uneventful, arriving at Algiers on 17 March. C-4 sailed for the United Kingdom escorting the return convoy MKF 10B uneventfully. In early April C-4 escorted convoy ON 177, making the trip safely, after being rerouted to avoid German wolfpacks. Amherst was reassigned to MOEF group C2 and the unit escorted ON 149 in late April. Though the German forces made contact during the transit, the convoy arrived safely.

Amherst underwent a major refit at Charlottetown, Prince Edward Island, getting her forecastle extended among other changes to the ship from May to November 1943. After more workups at Pictou, Nova Scotia the corvette returned to convoy escort duty in the Atlantic until her second refit in September 1944. After work was completed Amherst was worked up in Bermuda. Amherst was assigned to Halifax Force in January 1945, tasked with local defence. In March the corvette joined the escort group C-7 for one more round trip to the United Kingdom before the end of the war in the Atlantic. Amherst was awarded the battle honours "Atlantic 1941–45" and "Gulf of St. Lawrence 1944" for service during the Second World War.

=== Fate ===
Amherst was paid off from service on 11 July 1945 at Sydney, Nova Scotia. The corvette was then placed in reserve at Sorel, Quebec. The ship was one of seven corvettes disposed of by sale on 17 October to the Venezuelan Navy and was renamed Carobobo. However, while departing Canadian waters for Venezuela, the ship was wrecked in the Gulf of St. Lawrence. (Note: According to CFB Esquimault Naval and Military Museum, it was the Venezuelan Consul of Montreal that informed the shipbrokers that Amherst was the ship lost in transit.)
