= German submarine U-461 =

German World War II submarine

Coordinates: 45°33′N 10°48′W

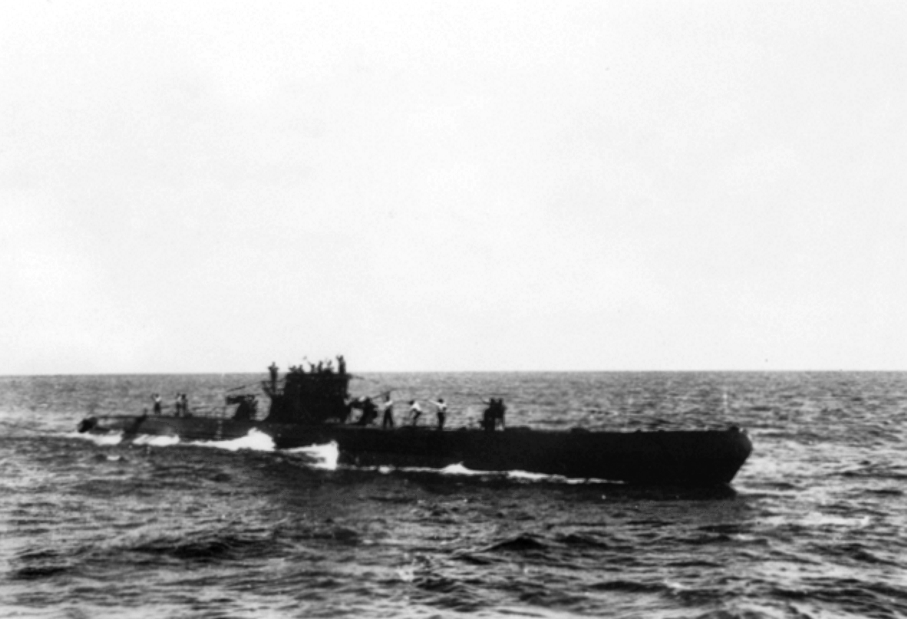
- U-461 in 1942 – 1943

History

Nazi Germany
- Name: U-461
- Ordered: 14 May 1940
- Builder: Deutsche Werke, Kiel
- Yard number: 292
- Laid down: 9 December 1940
- Launched: 8 November 1941
- Commissioned: 30 January 1942
- Fate: Sunk on 30 July 1943

General characteristics
- Class & type: Type XIV ocean-going submarine tanker
- Displacement: 1,688 t (1,661 long tons) surfaced; 1,932 t (1,901 long tons) submerged
- Length: 67.10 m (220 ft 2 in) o/a; 48.51 m (159 ft 2 in) pressure hull
- Beam: 9.35 m (30 ft 8 in) o/a; 4.90 m (16 ft 1 in) pressure hull
- Height: 11.70 m (38 ft 5 in)
- Draught: 6.51 m (21 ft 4 in)
- Installed power: 2,800–3,200 PS (2,100–2,400 kW; 2,800–3,200 bhp) (diesels); 750 PS (550 kW; 740 shp) (electric)
- Propulsion: 2 shafts; 2 × diesel engines; 2 × electric motors
- Speed: 14.4–14.9 knots (26.7–27.6 km/h; 16.6–17.1 mph) surfaced; 6.2 knots (11.5 km/h; 7.1 mph) submerged
- Range: 12,350 nmi (22,870 km; 14,210 mi) at 10 knots (19 km/h; 12 mph) surfaced; 55 nmi (102 km; 63 mi) at 4 knots (7.4 km/h; 4.6 mph) submerged
- Test depth: 240 m (790 ft)
- Complement: 6 officers and 47 enlisted
- Armament: 2 × 3.7 cm (1.5 in) SK C/30 anti-aircraft guns; 1 × 2 cm (0.79 in) C/30 AA gun

Service record
- Part of: 4th U-boat Flotilla; 30 January – 30 June 1942; 10th U-boat Flotilla; 1 July – 31 October 1942; 12th U-boat Flotilla; 1 November 1942 – 30 July 1943
- Identification codes: M 26 683
- Commanders: Kptlt. Hinrich-Oscar Bernbeck; 30 January – 21 April 1942; K.Kapt. Wolf-Harro Stiebler; 22 April 1942 – 30 July 1943
- Operations: 6 patrols: 1st patrol: 21 June – 16 August 1942; 2nd patrol: 7 September – 17 October 1942; 3rd patrol: 19 November 1942 – 3 January 1943; 4th patrol: 13 February – 22 March 1943; 5th patrol: a. 20 April – 30 May 1943; b. 22 – 23 July 1943; 6th patrol: 27 – 30 July 1943
- Victories: None

German submarine U-461 was a Type XIV supply and replenishment U-boat ("Milchkuh") of Nazi Germany's Kriegsmarine during World War II.

Her keel was laid down on 9 December 1940, by Deutsche Werke in Kiel as yard number 292. She was launched on 8 November 1941 and commissioned on 30 January 1942 with Oberleutnant zur See Hinrich-Oscar Bernbeck in command. Bernbeck was promoted to Kapitänleutnant by 21 April 1942, when he was relieved by Korvettenkapitän Wolf-Harro Stiebler.

== Design ==
German Type XIV submarines were shortened versions of the Type IXDs they were based on. U-461 had a displacement of 1,688 tonnes (1,661 long tons) when at the surface and 1,932 tonnes (1,901 long tons) while submerged. The U-boat had a total length of 67.10 m (220 ft 2 in), a pressure hull length of 48.51 m (159 ft 2 in), a beam of 9.35 m (30 ft 8 in), a height of 11.70 m (38 ft 5 in), and a draught of 6.51 m (21 ft 4 in). The submarine was powered by two Germaniawerft supercharged four-stroke, six-cylinder diesel engines producing a total of 2,800–3,200 metric horsepower (2,060–2,350 kW; 2,760–3,160 shp) for use while surfaced, two Siemens-Schuckert 2 GU 345/38-8 double-acting electric motors producing a total of 750 metric horsepower (550 kW; 740 shp) for use while submerged. She had two shafts and two propellers. The boat was capable of operating at depths of up to 240 metres (790 ft).

The submarine had a maximum surface speed of 14.4–14.9 knots (26.7–27.6 km/h; 16.6–17.1 mph) and a maximum submerged speed of 6.2 knots (11.5 km/h; 7.1 mph). When submerged, the boat could operate for 120 nautical miles (220 km; 140 mi) at 2 knots (3.7 km/h; 2.3 mph); when surfaced, she could travel 12,350 nautical miles (22,870 km; 14,210 mi) at 10 knots (19 km/h; 12 mph). U-461 was not fitted with torpedo tubes or deck guns, but had two 3.7 cm (1.5 in) SK C/30 anti-aircraft guns with 2500 rounds as well as a 2 cm (0.79 in) C/30 guns with 3000 rounds. The boat had a complement of fifty-three.

== Operational career ==
U-461 conducted six patrols. As a supply boat, she avoided combat.

=== First and second patrols ===
U-461's first patrol took her from Kiel to St. Nazaire in occupied France, via the gap between Iceland and the Faeroe Islands and out into the mid-Atlantic.

Her second patrol was much like her first; the most westerly point in the Atlantic was reached on 30 September 1942.

=== Third and fourth patrols ===
U-461's third sortie commenced with her departure from St. Nazaire on 19 November 1942. Travelling south, she reached the furthest spot in the patrol which was roughly between South America and Africa. There, she spent two days (according to her position reports), before moving a short distance west on 11 December 1942. She returned to her French base on 3 January 1943.

She steamed to a point west of the Canary Islands, which she reached on 2 March 1943. Having departed St. Nazaire on 13 February, she returned there for the last time on 22 March.

=== Fifth patrol ===
She left St.Nazaire on 20 April 1943, but was attacked on the return leg on 23 April by a Canadian Wellington of 172 squadron RAF, equipped with a Leigh Light. Three bombs were dropped, resulting in slight damage and, more seriously, a trail of oil. She returned to France, but this time to Bordeaux.

=== Sixth patrol and loss ===
She had left Bordeaux on 27 July 1943, but was hardly out of the Bay of Biscay, north-west of Cape Ortegal, Spain, when she was sunk on 30 July by an Australian Sunderland flying boat from No. 461 Squadron RAAF piloted by Flight Lieutenant Dudley Marrows. Coincidentally this aircraft had the registration "U", also making it known as 'U-461'. As a result of the attack, all 12 Australian crew on the flying boat agreed to drop an inflatable dinghy, fifteen of her crew survived; 53 were killed.

=== Wolfpacks ===
U-461 took part in three wolfpacks, namely:

- Wolf (26 July – 1 August 1942)
- Vorwärts (16 – 20 September 1942)
- Rochen (26 February – 1 March 1943)

== Bibliography ==
- Busch, Rainer; Röll, Hans-Joachim (1999). German U-boat commanders of World War II : a biographical dictionary. Translated by Brooks, Geoffrey. London, Annapolis, Md: Greenhill Books, Naval Institute Press. ISBN 1-55750-186-6.
- Busch, Rainer; Röll, Hans-Joachim (1999). Deutsche U-Boot-Verluste von September 1939 bis Mai 1945 [German U-boat losses from September 1939 to May 1945]. Der U-Boot-Krieg (in German). Vol. IV. Hamburg, Berlin, Bonn: Mittler. ISBN 3-8132-0514-2.
- Edwards, Bernard (1996). Dönitz and the Wolf Packs – The U-boats at War. Cassell Military Classics. pp. 83, 154. ISBN 0-304-35203-9.
- Gröner, Erich; Jung, Dieter; Maass, Martin (1991). U-boats and Mine Warfare Vessels. German Warships 1815–1945. Vol. 2. Translated by Thomas, Keith; Magowan, Rachel. London: Conway Maritime Press. ISBN 0-85177-593-4.
- Kemp, Paul (1999). U-Boats Destroyed – German Submarine Losses in the World Wars. London: Arms & Armour. ISBN 1-85409-515-3.
