= SS Empire Bay =

World War II merchant ship of the United Kingdom

History
- Name: Empire Bay
- Owner: Ministry of War Transport
- Operator: Joseph Constantine Steamship Line Ltd
- Port of registry: (United Kingdom) West Hartlepool
- Builder: W Gray & Co Ltd, Hartlepool
- Launched: 20 August 1940
- Completed: November 1940
- Identification: UK Official Number 160786; Code Letters GNFX
- Fate: Sunk by German bombing 15 January 1942

General characteristics
- Tonnage: 2,824 GRT
- Length: 310 ft 6 in (94.64 m)
- Beam: 44 ft 4 in (13.51 m)
- Depth: 19 ft 4 in (5.89 m)
- Propulsion: Triple expansion steam engine 255 hp (190 kW)
- Armament: 1 x 4" gun, 4 x machine guns

Location of the sinking of Empire Bay.

Empire Bay was a 2,824 GRT collier. She was built by W Gray & Co Ltd, Hartlepool in 1940. She was owned by the Ministry of War Transport (MoWT) and managed by the Joseph Constantine Steamship Line Ltd. Empire Bay was sunk by German bombing off Middlesbrough on 15 January 1942.

== Career ==
Empire Bay was built by William Gray & Sons Ltd, Hartlepool, Co. Durham. She was launched on 20 August 1940 and completed in November that year. She was built for the MoWT and placed under the management of Joseph Constantine Steamship Line Ltd. Her port of registry was West Hartlepool.

=== War service ===
Empire Bay was a member of a number of convoys during the Second World War.

HG59

Convoy HG 59 sailed from Gibraltar on 13 April 1941 and arrived at Liverpool on 1 May. Empire Bay was carrying a cargo of iron ore and was bound for Workington.

HG75

Convoy HG 75 which sailed from Gibraltar on 22 October 1941 and arrived at Liverpool on 3 November. Empire Bay was carrying a cargo of iron ore and was bound for Barrow-in-Furness.

OS 14

Convoy OS 14 which sailed from Liverpool on 13 December 1941 and arrived at Freetown, Sierra Leone on 3 January 1942. Empire Bay left the convoy shortly after it sailed and was bound for Glasgow. At the time she was armed with a 4" gun and four machine guns.

=== Sinking ===
On 15 January 1942, Empire Bay was bombed by Dornier Do 217 E-4 U5+HS of 8 Staffeln, Kampfgeschwader 2, based at Schiphol, the Netherlands. Empire Bay's anti-aircraft guns damaged the Dornier, which later flew into the cable of a barrage balloon in Billingham and subsequently crashed at railway sidings in South Bank, Middlesbrough killing all four crew. At the time Empire Bay was in Tees Bay, off Middlesbrough while on a voyage from Hartlepool to London. She sank at 54°41′08″N 1°08′36″W. The entire crew were rescued alive. The wreck lies in 59 feet (18 m) of water and large sections of the ship can still be found.

== Official numbers and code letters ==
Official numbers were a forerunner to IMO Numbers. Empire Bay had the UK Official Number 160786 and used the Code Letters GNFX.

== Propulsion ==
Empire Bay was powered by a triple-expansion steam engine manufactured by the Central Marine Engine Works, West Hartlepool. The cylinders were 20 inches (51 cm), 31 inches (79 cm) and 55 inches (140 cm) diameter by 39 inches (99 cm) stroke. The engine developed 255 horsepower (190 kW).
