= German submarine U-218 =

German World War II submarine

Coordinates: 55°28′N 7°18′W

History

Nazi Germany
- Name: U-218
- Ordered: 16 February 1940
- Builder: Germaniawerft, Kiel
- Yard number: 650
- Laid down: 17 March 1941
- Launched: 5 December 1941
- Commissioned: 24 January 1942
- Fate: Surrendered on 12 May 1945; Scuttled on 4 December 1945 during Operation Deadlight

General characteristics
- Class & type: Type VIID submarine
- Displacement: 965 tonnes (950 long tons) surfaced; 1,080 t (1,060 long tons) submerged
- Length: 76.90 m (252 ft 4 in) o/a; 59.80 m (196 ft 2 in) pressure hull
- Beam: 6.38 m (20 ft 11 in) o/a; 4.70 m (15 ft 5 in) pressure hull
- Height: 9.70 m (31 ft 10 in)
- Draught: 5.01 m (16 ft 5 in)
- Installed power: 2,800–3,200 PS (2,100–2,400 kW; 2,800–3,200 bhp) (diesels); 750 PS (550 kW; 740 shp) (electric)
- Propulsion: 2 shafts; 2 × diesel engines; 2 × electric motors
- Speed: 16–16.7 knots (29.6–30.9 km/h; 18.4–19.2 mph) surfaced; 7.3 knots (13.5 km/h; 8.4 mph) submerged
- Range: 11,200 nmi (20,700 km; 12,900 mi) at 10 knots (19 km/h; 12 mph) surfaced; 69 nmi (128 km; 79 mi) at 4 knots (7.4 km/h; 4.6 mph) submerged
- Test depth: 200 m (660 ft); Crush depth: 220–240 m (720–790 ft)
- Crew: 4 officers, 40 enlisted
- Armament: 5 × 53.3 cm (21 in) torpedo tubes (four bow, one stern); 12 × torpedoes or 26 × TMA or 39 × TMB tube-launched mines; 5 × vertical launchers with 15 SMA mines; 1 × 8.8 cm (3.46 in) deck gun (220 rounds); 1 × 20 mm AA (4,380 rounds)

Service record
- Part of: 5th U-boat Flotilla; 24 January – 31 August 1942; 9th U-boat Flotilla; 1 September 1942 – 30 September 1944; 8th U-boat Flotilla; 1 October 1944 – 1 March 1945; 11th U-boat Flotilla; 1 March – 8 May 1945
- Identification codes: M 23 260
- Commanders: Kptlt. Richard Becker; 24 January 1942 – August 1944; Kptlt. Rupprecht Stock; August 1944 – 12 May 1945
- Operations: 10 patrols: 1st patrol: 28 August – 29 September 1942; 2nd patrol: 25 October – 21 November 1942; 3rd patrol: a. 7 January – 10 March 1943; b. 18 – 19 April 1943; 4th patrol: a. 20 April – 2 June 1943; b. 22 – 23 July 1943; 5th patrol: 29 July – 6 August 1943; 6th patrol: 19 September – 8 December 1943; 7th patrol: 12 February – 7 May 1944; 8th patrol: 13 June – 10 July 1944; 9th patrol: a. 10 August – 23 September 1944; b. 6 – 12 October 1944; c. 17 October 1944; d. 6 – 7 March 1945; e. 10 March 1945; f. 11 – 12 March 1945; g. 14 March 1945; h. 17 – 20 March 1945; 10th patrol: 22 March – 8 May 1945
- Victories: 2 merchant ships sunk (346 GRT); 1 merchant ship damaged (7,361 GRT); 1 auxiliary warship damaged (7,177 GRT)

German submarine U-218 was a Type VIID mine-laying U-boat of Nazi Germany's Kriegsmarine during World War II.

Laid down on 17 March 1941 as yard number 650 and launched on 5 December, she was commissioned on 24 January 1942 under the command of Kapitänleutnant Richard Becker. She served with the 5th U-boat Flotilla – a training unit; the 9th flotilla from 1 September 1942 to 30 September 1944, the 8th flotilla, and finally with the 11th flotilla, all operational units, the latter from 1 March 1945 to 8 May. She was a member of seven wolfpacks.

== Design ==
As one of the six German Type VIID submarines, U-218 had a displacement of 965 tonnes (950 long tons) when at the surface and 1,080 tonnes (1,060 long tons) while submerged. She had a total length of 76.90 m (252 ft 4 in), a pressure hull length of 59.80 m (196 ft 2 in), a beam of 6.38 m (20 ft 11 in), a height of 9.70 m (31 ft 10 in), and a draught of 5.01 m (16 ft 5 in). The submarine was powered by two Germaniawerft F46 supercharged four-stroke, six-cylinder diesel engines producing a total of 2,800 to 3,200 metric horsepower (2,060 to 2,350 kW; 2,760 to 3,160 shp) for use while surfaced, two AEG GU 460/8-276 double-acting electric motors producing a total of 750 shaft horsepower (760 PS; 560 kW) for use while submerged. She had two shafts and two 1.23 m (4 ft) propellers. The boat was capable of operating at depths of up to 230 metres (750 ft).

The submarine had a maximum surface speed of 16–16.7 knots (29.6–30.9 km/h; 18.4–19.2 mph) and a maximum submerged speed of 7.3 knots (13.5 km/h; 8.4 mph). When submerged, the boat could operate for 69 nautical miles (128 km; 79 mi) at 4 knots (7.4 km/h; 4.6 mph); when surfaced, she could travel 11,200 nautical miles (20,700 km; 12,900 mi) at 10 knots (19 km/h; 12 mph). U-218 was fitted with five 53.3 cm (21 in) torpedo tubes (four fitted at the bow and one at the stern), twelve torpedoes, one 8.8 cm (3.46 in) SK C/35 naval gun, 220 rounds, and an anti-aircraft gun, in addition to five mine tubes with fifteen SMA mines. The boat had a complement of between forty-four.

== Service history ==
=== First patrol ===
U-218 departed Kiel on her first patrol on 28 August 1942. She moved 'up' the length of the North Sea, through the gap separating Iceland and the Faroe Islands and into the Atlantic Ocean, heading south-west. She damaged Fjordaas in mid-ocean on 11 September. An inspection by the vessel's Master, 1st Mate and Chief Engineer preceded her recovery to the Clyde where she was repaired and returned to service in December 1942.

The escorts of Convoy ON 127 damaged the boat the following day so severely she was obliged to abort the patrol and head for occupied France.

U-218 docked at Brest on 29 September.

=== Second patrol ===
Her luck did not improve on her second foray. The submarine was attacked from the air and by surface ships south-west of Portugal on 15 November 1942. The damage inflicted was bad enough to force her to return to Brest on the 25th.

=== Third and fourth patrols ===
U-218's third and fourth efforts were in early and mid-summer 1943. They were relatively uneventful.

=== Fifth patrol ===
The routine of the boat's fifth sortie was rudely interrupted on 2 August 1943 by an attack by a Vickers Wellington of No. 547 Squadron RAF west of the Bay of Biscay. Six crewmen were wounded, the submarine was severely damaged and once again an early return was required.

=== Sixth and seventh patrols ===
Patrol number six was marked by two men falling overboard in heavy weather on 27 September 1943 – they were both picked up 45 minutes later. A month later the boat laid mines near Port of Spain, Trinidad on 27 October.

U-218 had a rare triumph on 5 November when she sank the sailing ship Beatrice Beck east of Martinique with her cargo of cod.

The boat departed Brest for what became her seventh and longest patrol (86 days) on 12 February 1944. She did not return until 7 May. Nevertheless, the waters east of the West Indies were unproductive.

=== Eighth patrol ===
The boat was hunted 'mercilessly' for sixty hours from 15 June 1944; she eventually shook off her attackers. She damaged the auxiliary cruiser HMS Empire Halberd on 6 July with a mine laid on the second off Lands End (south-west England). The ship was taken, first to Falmouth, then Glasgow for repairs. She returned to service in late 1944 as HMS Silvio. Meanwhile, the U-boat returned to Brest on 10 July.

=== Ninth and tenth patrols ===
Having departed Brest for the last time on 10 August 1944, U-218 laid mines near Lizard Head (Cornwall), before retracing her course west of Ireland. She arrived in Bergen, Norway on 23 September. There now followed a series of short journeys between October 1944 and March 1945.

The boat's tenth and final patrol began with her departure from Bergen on 22 March 1945. She sank the Ethel Crawford on 20 April with a mine laid on the 18th in the Firth of Clyde.

=== Fate ===
U-218 surrendered in Bergen on 12 May 1945. She was transferred to Loch Ryan in Scotland in anticipation of Operation Deadlight. She sank while under tow to the scuttling grounds about eight or nine nautical miles north of Inishtrahull (the most northerly island of Ireland) on 4 December.

=== Afterword ===
U-218 was also thought to be responsible for sinking the last British ship to be sunk as the result of World War II. The steam fishing vessel Kurd was sunk on 10 July 1945 after hitting a British mine off Lizard Head

The wreck of the U-boat was identified by marine archaeologist Innes McCartney in 2001 off Malin Head.

=== Wolfpacks ===
U-218 took part in seven wolfpacks, namely:

- Vorwärts (4 – 15 September 1942)
- Natter (2 – 8 November 1942)
- Westwall (8 – 15 November 1942)
- Rochen (27 January – 25 February 1943)
- Naab (12 – 15 May 1943)
- Donau 2 (15 – 19 May 1943)
- Mosel (19 – 24 May 1943)

== Summary of raiding history ==
Date	Name	Nationality	Tonnage (GRT)	Fate
11 September 1942	Fjordas	Norway	7,361	Damaged
5 November 1943	Beatrice Beck	United Kingdom	146	Sunk
6 July 1944	HMS Empire Halberd	Royal Navy	7,177	Damaged (Mine)
20 April 1945	Ethel Crawford	United Kingdom	200	Sunk (Mine)

== Bibliography ==
- Bishop, C (2006). Kriegsmarine U-Boats, 1939-45. Amber Books.
- Busch, Rainer; Röll, Hans-Joachim (1999). German U-boat commanders of World War II : a biographical dictionary. Translated by Brooks, Geoffrey. London, Annapolis, Md: Greenhill Books, Naval Institute Press. ISBN 1-55750-186-6.
- Busch, Rainer; Röll, Hans-Joachim (1999). Deutsche U-Boot-Verluste von September 1939 bis Mai 1945 [German U-boat losses from September 1939 to May 1945]. Der U-Boot-Krieg (in German). Vol. IV. Hamburg, Berlin, Bonn: Mittler. ISBN 3-8132-0514-2.
- Gröner, Erich; Jung, Dieter; Maass, Martin (1991). U-boats and Mine Warfare Vessels. German Warships 1815–1945. Vol. 2. Translated by Thomas, Keith; Magowan, Rachel. London: Conway Maritime Press. ISBN 0-85177-593-4.
