= HMCS Sherbrooke =

Flower-class corvette

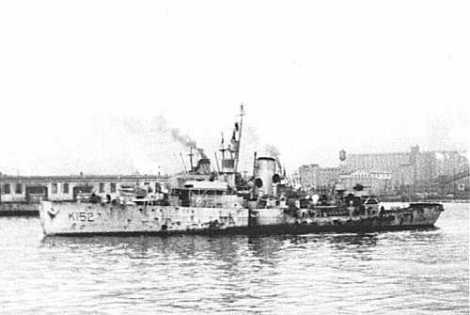
- HMCS Sherbrooke

History

Canada
- Name: Sherbrooke
- Namesake: Sherbrooke, Quebec
- Ordered: 22 January 1940
- Builder: Marine Industries Ltd., Sorel
- Laid down: 5 August 1940
- Launched: 25 October 1940
- Commissioned: 5 June 1941
- Out of service: paid off 28 June 1945
- Identification: Pennant number: K152
- Honours and awards: Atlantic 1941–45
- Fate: Sold for scrapping May 1947.

General characteristics
- Class & type: Flower-class corvette (original)
- Displacement: 950 long tons (970 t; 1,060 short tons)
- Length: 205 ft (62.48 m)
- Beam: 33 ft (10.06 m)
- Draught: 11.5 ft (3.51 m)
- Propulsion: Single shaft; 2 water tube boilers; 1 4-cyl. triple expansion steam engine, 2,750 hp (2,050 kW)
- Speed: 16 knots (29.6 km/h)
- Range: 3,450 nmi (6,390 km; 3,970 mi) at 12 kn (22 km/h; 14 mph)
- Complement: 6 officers, 79 enlisted
- Sensors & processing systems: Radar – SW1C or 2C (later); Sonar – Type 123A, later Type 127DV
- Armament: 1 × BL 4 in (102 mm) Mk.IX single gun; 2 .50 cal machine gun twin; 2 Lewis .303 cal mg twin; 2 Mk.II depth charge throwers; 2 depth charge rails with 40 depth charges.; Originally fitted with minesweeping gear, later removed.

HMCS Sherbrooke was a Flower-class corvette that served with the Royal Canadian Navy during the Second World War. She served primarily in the Battle of the Atlantic as an ocean escort. She is named for Sherbrooke, Quebec.

== Background ==
Flower-class corvettes like Sherbrooke serving with the Royal Canadian Navy during the Second World War were different from earlier and more traditional sail-driven corvettes. The "corvette" designation was created by the French for classes of small warships; the Royal Navy borrowed the term for a period but discontinued its use in 1877. During the hurried preparations for war in the late 1930s, Winston Churchill reactivated the corvette class, needing a name for smaller ships used in an escort capacity, in this case based on a whaling ship design. The generic name "flower" was used to designate the class of these ships, which – in the Royal Navy – were named after flowering plants.

Corvettes commissioned by the Royal Canadian Navy during the Second World War were named after communities for the most part, to better represent the people who took part in building them. This idea was put forth by Admiral Percy W. Nelles. Sponsors were commonly associated with the community for which the ship was named. Royal Navy corvettes were designed as open sea escorts, while Canadian corvettes were developed for coastal auxiliary roles which was exemplified by their minesweeping gear. Eventually the Canadian corvettes would be modified to allow them to perform better on the open seas.

== Construction ==
Sherbrooke was ordered 22 January 1940 as part of the 1939–1940 Flower-class building program. She was laid down 5 August 1940 by Marine Industries Ltd. at Sorel, Quebec and launched 25 October 1940. She was commissioned 5 June 1941 at Sorel.

During her career, Sherbrooke underwent two significant refits. The first took place at Lunenburg, Nova Scotia from April to June 1943. The second major overhaul took place at Liverpool, Nova Scotia beginning in May 1944 and lasting until 22 August 1944. During this second refit, Sherbrooke had her fo'c'sle extended. She needed a further month of repairs at Halifax after completing the refit.

== Service history ==
After arriving at Halifax for deployment, she was initially assigned to Halifax Force as a local escort. In September 1941 she transferred to Newfoundland Command and escorted her first convoy from St. John's to Iceland at the end of that month. She would continue to escort these convoys until January 1942 when the European destination changed to Derry and she became a member of the Mid-Ocean Escort Force (MOEF).

She served mainly with MOEF escort group C-4. In February 1942 Sherbrooke picked up 15 survivors from the Greek merchant Meropi that had been torpedoed and sunk off Halifax. As a member of C-4 she took part in the major convoy battles for convoy ON 127 in August 1942 and HX 229 in March 1943. On 10 September 1942 she picked up 39 survivors from the Norwegian tanker Sveve that had been torpedoed and sunk in the North Atlantic.

After returning from her first major refit, Sherbrooke joined the Western Local Escort Force (WLEF) which escorted convoys along the North American coast. As a member of WLEF she was initially assigned to escort group W-2, but transferred to W-7 in April 1944. After returning from her second major refit, she rejoined WLEF and was made part of escort group W-1. She remained with this group until the end of the war.

Sherbrooke was paid off at Sorel on 28 June 1945. The ship was sold for scrap in May 1947 and broken up at Hamilton, Ontario.
