= List of shipwrecks in September 1942 =

The list of shipwrecks in September 1942 includes all ships sunk, foundered, grounded, or otherwise lost during September 1942.

== 1 September ==
List of shipwrecks: 1 September 1942
Ship	State	Description
Bur	Norway	The cargo ship ran aground on the Valiant Rock, in Long Island Sound, and sank. She was refloated on 3 October 1943 and consequently scrapped.
Crown City	United States	The cargo ship was wrecked on the coast of Sledge Island in the Bering Sea off the west-central coast of the Territory of Alaska. Much of her cargo – foodstuffs, mobile machinery, Quonset huts, clothing, coal, ore, gasoline, airplane parts, and a deck load of lumber – was salvaged.
Ilorin	United Kingdom	World War II: The coaster (815 GRT) was torpedoed and sunk in the Gulf of Guinea off Legu, Gold Coast (5°00′N 1°00′W) by U-125 (Kriegsmarine) with the loss of 33 of her 37 crew.
Purga	Soviet Navy	World War II: The Uragan-class guard ship (600 GRT) was sunk in Lake Ladoga by Luftwaffe aircraft. 14 crew were killed or died of wounds.
U-756	Kriegsmarine	World War II: The Type VIIC submarine was depth charged and sunk in the Atlantic Ocean (57°41′N 31°30′W) by HMCS Morden (Royal Canadian Navy) with the loss of all 43 crew.

== 2 September ==
List of shipwrecks: 2 September 1942
Ship	State	Description
Gazcon	United Kingdom	World War II: The cargo ship was torpedoed and sunk in the Gulf of Aden north of Cape Guardafui, Italian Somaliland (13°01′N 50°41′E) by I-29 (Imperial Japanese Navy) with the loss of twelve of the 49 people on board.
HMS LCP(L) 83	Royal Navy	The Landing Craft, Personnel (Large) was lost on this date.
Passat	Germany	World War II: The tanker was bombed and sunk off Pauillac, Gironde, France in an Allied air raid. She was refloated in 1949 and scrapped.
PB-35	Imperial Japanese Navy	World War II: The patrol boat, a former Momi-class destroyer, was bombed and sunk off Santa Isabel Island (07°16′S 158°03′E) by Boeing B-17 Flying Fortress aircraft of the 11th Bomb Group, United States Army Air Force. Ninety-two of her crew were killed.
Picci Fassio	Italy	World War II: The tanker was torpedoed and sunk in the Mediterranean Sea north of Derna, Libya (33°26′N 22°41′E) by aircraft of the Royal Air Force. Thirteen of her 33 crew were killed.
RTShch-124	Soviet Navy	The K-15/M-17-class river minesweeping launch was sunk on this date.
Sperrbrecher 164 Bitsch	Kriegsmarine	World War II: The Sperrbrecher struck a mine and sank in the North Sea off Schiermonnikoog, Friesland, Netherlands.
Teikyu Maru	Japan	World War II: The cargo ship was torpedoed and sunk off Kinkasan Harbour, Honshū (42°08′N 141°15′E) by USS Guardfish (United States Navy). A crew member was killed.
U-222	Kriegsmarine	The Type VIIC submarine collided with U-626 (Kriegsmarine) and sank in the Baltic Sea off Pillau (54°25′N 19°30′E) with the loss of 48 of her 51 crew.

== 3 September ==
List of shipwrecks: 3 September 1942
Ship	State	Description
Arnon	Palestine	World War II: The coaster was torpedoed and sunk in the Mediterranean Sea 5 nautical miles (9.3 km) north of Tartus, Syria by U-375 (Kriegsmarine). Her crew survived.
Donald Stewart	Canada	World War II: Convoy LN-7: The cargo ship was torpedoed and sunk in the Gulf of St. Lawrence (50°32′N 58°46′W) by U-517 (Kriegsmarine) with the loss of three of her 20 crew. Survivors were rescued by HMCS Shawinigan and HMCS Trail (both Royal Canadian Navy).
F 355	Kriegsmarine	The Type A Marinefahrprahm was sunk on this date.
Hollinside	United Kingdom	World War II: The cargo ship was torpedoed and sunk in the Atlantic Ocean 3 nautical miles (5.6 km) off Cape Sines, Portugal (approximately 38°N 9°W) by U-107 (Kriegsmarine) with the loss of three of the 51 people on board. Survivors were rescued by Spanish fishing trawlers.
Miriam	Palestine	World War II: The sailing ship was shelled and sunk in the Mediterranean Sea 5 nautical miles (9.3 km) north of Tartus by U-375 (Kriegsmarine). Her crew survived.
Ocean Might	United Kingdom	World War II: The Ocean ship was torpedoed and sunk in the Atlantic Ocean (0°57′N 4°11′W) by U-109 (Kriegsmarine) with the loss of four of her 54 crew. Survivors reached land in their lifeboats.
Oktyabr	Soviet Navy	World War II: The gunboat was torpedoed and sunk in the Black Sea off the Taman Peninsula by S 27, S 28, S 72 and S 102 (all Kriegsmarine).
Penrose	United Kingdom	World War II: The cargo ship was torpedoed and sunk in the Atlantic Ocean 3 nautical miles (5.6 km) off Cape Sines (approximately 38°N 9°W) by U-107 (Kriegsmarine) with the loss of two of her 45 crew. Survivors were rescued by a Spanish fishing trawler.
Proletari	Soviet Union	World War II: The tug was torpedoed and sunk in the Black Sea off the Taman Peninsula by S 27, S 28, S 72 and S 102 (all Kriegsmarine).
Rostov-Don	Soviet Navy	World War II: The gunboat was torpedoed and sunk in the Black Sea off the Taman Peninsula by S 27, S 28, S 72 and S 102 (all Kriegsmarine).
S 27	Kriegsmarine	World War II: The E-boat was sunk in the Black Sea off the Taman Peninsula by one of her own torpedoes.
Turkian	Egypt	World War II: The sailing ship was shelled and sunk in the Mediterranean Sea 5 nautical miles (9.3 km) north of Tartus by U-375 (Kriegsmarine). Her crew survived.
U-162	Kriegsmarine	World War II: The Type IXC submarine (1,540 GRT) was depth charged and sunk in the Atlantic Ocean north east of Trinidad (12°21′N 59°29′W) by HMS Pathfinder, HMS Quentin and HMS Vimy (all Royal Navy) with the loss of two of her 51 crew.
U-705	Kriegsmarine	World War II: The Type VIIC submarine was depth charged and sunk in the Bay of Biscay (46°42′N 11°07′W) by an Armstrong Whitworth Whitley aircraft of 77 Squadron, Royal Air Force with the loss of all 45 crew.
Viros	Sweden	World War II: The fishing boat (190 GRT) was sunk by a mine west of Hirtshals, Denmark with the loss of all ten crew.
USS Wakefield	United States Navy	The troopship caught fire in the Atlantic Ocean. She was taken in tow by Foundation Frankin ( Canada) on 5 September and beached at McNab's Cove, Halifax, Nova Scotia, Canada on 8 September. Refloated on 14 September, eventually towed to Boston, Massachusetts, where she was declared a constructive total loss, but was repaired and returned to service.
41	Soviet Union	World War II: The barge was torpedoed and sunk in the Black Sea off the Taman Peninsula by S 27, S 28, S 72 and S 102 (all Kriegsmarine).

== 4 September ==
List of shipwrecks: 4 September 1942
Ship	State	Description
Amatlan	Mexico	World War II: The tanker was torpedoed and sunk in the Gulf of Mexico (23°27′N 97°30′W) by U-171 (Kriegsmarine) with the loss of ten of her 34 crew.
Chita Maru	Japan	World War II: The cargo ship was torpedoed and sunk in Kuji Bay by USS Guardfish (United States Navy).
Davide Bianchi	Italy	World War II: The cargo ship (1,477 GRT) was torpedoed and sunk in the Mediterranean Sea north of Tobruk, Libya by Allied aircraft with the loss of 7 lives. There were 33 survivors.
Kaimei Maru	Imperial Japanese Navy	World War II: The British WWI B-class standard cargo ship/transport ship was torpedoed and sunk off Kuji Bay by USS Guardfish (United States Navy). Ten crew killed.
Kashino	Imperial Japanese Navy	World War II: The Kashino-class ammunition ship was torpedoed, shelled, and sunk in the South China Sea 70 nautical miles (130 km; 81 mi) northeast of Keelung, Formosa (25°45′N 122°42′E) by USS Growler (United States Navy).
Padenna	Italy	World War II: The cargo ship (1,589 GRT) was torpedoed and sunk in the Mediterranean Sea approximately 45 nautical miles (83 km) north of Tobruk, Libya (32°43′N 24°10′E) by HMS Thrasher (Royal Navy) with the loss of 20 of her 34 crew.
Polluce	Regia Marina	World War II: The Spica-class torpedo boat (670 GRT) was sunk by British aircraft some fifty miles north of Tobruk (32°38′N 23°38′E) with the loss of 30 of her 150 crew.
HSwMS Sjöborren	Swedish Navy	The Sjölejonet-class submarine collided with Virginia (Sweden) and sank in the Baltic Sea off the east coast of Sweden. A crew member died.
Tenryu Maru	Japan	World War II: The cargo ship was torpedoed and sunk in Kuji Bay by USS Guardfish (United States Navy).

== 5 September ==
List of shipwrecks: 5 September 1942
Ship	State	Description
Albachiara	Italy	World War II: The cargo ship was torpedoed and sunk off Derna, Libya, by HMS Traveller (Royal Navy).
F 157	Kriegsmarine	The Type A Marinefahrprahm was sunk on this date.
USS Gregory	United States Navy	World War II: The high-speed transport, a former Wickes-class destroyer, was sunk in the Pacific Ocean near Guadalcanal, Solomon Islands by Hatsuyuki, Murakumo and Yūdachi (all Imperial Japanese Navy).
USS Little	United States Navy	World War II: The high-speed transport, a former Wickes-class destroyer, was sunk in the Pacific Ocean near Guadalcanal by Hatsuyuki, Murakumo and Yūdachi (all Imperial Japanese Navy).
Lord Strathcona	Canada	World War II: The cargo ship was torpedoed and sunk in Conception Bay (47°35′N 52°29′W) by U-513 (Kriegsmarine). Her 44 crew survived.
Myrmidon	United Kingdom	World War II: The ocean liner was torpedoed and sunk in the Atlantic Ocean south east of Cape Palmas, Liberia (0°45′N 6°27′W) by U-506 (Kriegsmarine). All 245 people on board were rescued by HMS Brilliant (Royal Navy).
Neptun	Sweden	World War II: The fishing boat (37 GRT) was sunk by a mine west of Hirtshals, Denmark. The whole crew survived.
Saganaga	United Kingdom	World War II: The cargo ship was torpedoed and sunk in Conception Bay (47°35′N 52°29′W) by U-513 (Kriegsmarine) with the loss of 30 of her 44 crew.

== 6 September ==
List of shipwrecks: 6 September 1942
Ship	State	Description
Aeas	Greece	World War II: Convoy QS-33: The cargo ship was torpedoed and sunk in the Saint Lawrence River (49°10′N 66°50′W) by U-165 (Kriegsmarine) with the loss of two of her 31 crew.
Anshun	United Kingdom	The wreck of Anshun (left) in Milne Bay. World War II: Battle of Milne Bay: The cargo ship was sunk in Milne Bay by Tenryū (Imperial Japanese Navy) in a night attack. Two American gunners were killed. Anshun was refloated in 1944 and returned to service in 1947 as Culcairn.
Britannic	Finland	World War II: The cargo ship struck a mine and sank in the North Sea off Aalborg, Denmark.
Helen Forsey	United Kingdom	World War II: The schooner was shelled and sunk in the Atlantic Ocean 500 nautical miles (930 km) east south east of Bermuda (28°35′N 57°35′W) by U-514 (Kriegsmarine) with the loss of two of her six crew.
John A. Holloway	Canada	World War II: Convoy GAT 2: The cargo ship was torpedoed and sunk in the Caribbean Sea north of Gallinas Punta, Colombia (14°10′N 71°30′W) by U-164 (Kriegsmarine) with the loss of one of her 24 crew.
Salina	Palestine	World War II: The sailing ship was shelled and sunk in the Mediterranean Sea 20 nautical miles (37 km) off Khan Yunis by U-375 (Kriegsmarine). Her nineteen crew survived.
Taika Maru	Japan	World War II: The cargo ship was torpedoed and sunk in the South China Sea off the east coast of Formosa, China by USS Growler (United States Navy). She split in two and sank in two minutes.
Tuscan Star	United Kingdom	World War II: The cargo liner was torpedoed and sunk in the Atlantic Ocean 300 nautical miles (560 km) south west of Cape Palmas, Liberia (1°34′N 11°39′W) by U-109 (Kriegsmarine) with the loss of 51 of the 114 people on board. Survivors were rescued by Otranto (United Kingdom).
USS YP-74	United States Navy	Carrying a unit of Seabees, the yard patrol boat (101 GRT) sank in Unimak Pass in the Aleutian Islands, Territory of Alaska with the loss of four lives after colliding in fog with Derblay (United States) that rescued the 21 survivors.
No. 44	Soviet Navy	The G-5-class motor torpedo boat was lost on this date.

== 7 September ==
List of shipwrecks: 7 September 1942
Ship	State	Description
Mount Pindus	Greece	World War II: Convoy QS-33: The cargo ship was torpedoed and sunk in the Gulf of St. Lawrence south of Anticosti Island, Quebec, Canada (48°50′N 63°46′W) by U-517 (Kriegsmarine) with the loss of two of her 37 crew.
Mount Taygetus	Greece	World War II: Convoy QS-33: The cargo ship was torpedoed and sunk in the Gulf of St. Lawrence south of Anticosti Island (48°50′N 63°46′W) by U-517 (Kriegsmarine) with the loss of two of her 28 crew.
Oakton	Canada	World War II: Convoy QS-33: The cargo ship was torpedoed and sunk in the Gulf of St. Lawrence south of Anticosti Island (48°50′N 63°46′W) by U-517 (Kriegsmarine) with the loss of three of her twenty crew. Survivors were rescued by HMCS Q083 (Royal Canadian Navy).
Puchero	Panama	The cargo ship was driven ashore at Punta Herrero, Mexico (19°18′N 87°27′W) and was declared a total loss. The wreck was broken up in 1943.
HMCS Raccoon	Royal Canadian Navy	World War II: Convoy QS-33: The armed yacht was torpedoed and sunk in the Strait of Belle Isle (49°01′N 67°17′W) by U-165 (Kriegsmarine) with the loss of all 37 crew.
Tor II	Faroe Islands	World War II: The fishing trawler was sunk in the Atlantic Ocean south of Iceland (62°30′N 18°30′W) by U-617 (Kriegsmarine) with the loss of eighteen of her 21 crew.
Tynningö	Sweden	World War II: The cargo ship (4,315 GRT) struck a mine and sank in the North Sea off Borkum, Germany. Her 32 crew survived.

== 9 September ==
List of shipwrecks: 9 September 1942
Ship	State	Description
Henca	Netherlands	World War II: The coaster was bombed and sunk in the English Channel by aircraft of 263 Squadron, Royal Air Force. She was on a voyage from Cherbourg, Manche, France to Alderney, Channel Islands.
K-2	Soviet Navy	World War II: The K-class submarine struck a mine and sank in the Tanafjord.
MAS 571	Regia Marina	World War II: The MAS 555-class MAS boat (29 GRT) was bombed and sunk at Yalta, Soviet Union, by aircraft of the Soviet Naval Air Force. No crew was killed, the raid doing a total of 3 wounded on the several ships hit.
MAS 573	Regia Marina	World War II: The MAS 555-class MAS boat (29 GRT) was bombed and sunk at Yalta, Soviet Union, by aircraft of the Soviet Naval Air Force. No crew was killed, the raid doing a total of 3 wounded on the several ships hit.
USCGC Muskeget	United States Coast Guard	World War II: The weather ship was torpedoed and sunk in the Atlantic Ocean (51°41′N 43°53′W) by U-755 (Kriegsmarine) with the loss of all 121 people on board.
Peiping	Sweden	World War II: The cargo ship (6,392 GRT) was torpedoed and sunk in the Atlantic Ocean (23°50′N 50°10′W) by U-66 (Kriegsmarine) with the loss of three of her 34 crew.
USS YP-346	United States Navy	World War II: The yard patrol boat (259 GRT) was shelled and sunk, or beached, in the Solomon Islands off Tulagi by Sendai (Imperial Japanese Navy). One crew was killed.

== 10 September ==
List of shipwrecks: 10 September 1942
Ship	State	Description
American Leader	United States	World War II: The cargo ship was torpedoed and sunk in the Atlantic Ocean 800 nautical miles (1,500 km) west of Cape Town, Union of South Africa (45°44′7″S 9°46′1″E) by Michel (Kriegsmarine) with the loss of eleven of her 58 crew.
Arno	Regia Marina	World War II: The hospital ship was torpedoed and sunk in the Mediterranean Sea 40 nautical miles (74 km) north east of Ras el Tin, Libya by Royal Air Force aircraft.
Elisabeth van België	Belgium	Elisabeth van België World War II: Convoy ON 127: The cargo ship was torpedoed and sunk in the Atlantic Ocean (51°30′N 28°25′W) by U-96 (Kriegsmarine) with the loss of one of her 56 crew.
Empire Oil	United Kingdom	World War II: Convoy ON 157: The tanker straggled behind the convoy. She was torpedoed and damaged in the Atlantic Ocean (51°23′N 28°13′W) by U-659 (Kriegsmarine). She was then torpedoed and sunk the next day by U-584 (Kriegsmarine). Her 53 crew were rescued by HMCS Ottawa and HMCS St. Croix (both Royal Canadian Navy).
Haresfield	United Kingdom	World War II: The cargo ship was torpedoed and sunk in the Arabian Sea (13°05′N 54°35′E) by I-29 (Imperial Japanese Navy). Her 85 crew survived.
HMS MGB 335	Royal Navy	World War II: The Fairmile C motor gunboat was shelled and sunk in the North Sea by Kriegsmarine surface vessels.
RFA Sveve	Royal Fleet Auxiliary	World War II: Convoy ON 127: The tanker was torpedoed and sunk in the Atlantic Ocean by U-96 (Kriegsmarine). Her 39 crew were rescued by HMCS Sherbrooke (Royal Canadian Navy).
Zuiun Maru	Japan	World War II: Convoy No. 160: The coaster collided with Kurosio Maru (Imperial Japanese Army) whilst in convoy from Moji to Takao, Formosa, China and sank.
No. 75	Soviet Navy	The G-5-class motor torpedo boat was lost on this date.

== 11 September ==
List of shipwrecks: 11 September 1942
Ship	State	Description
HMCS Charlottetown	Royal Canadian Navy	World War II: Convoy SQ 30: The Flower-class corvette was torpedoed and sunk in the Gulf of St Lawrence 11 nautical miles (20 km) off Cap-Chat, Quebec by U-517 (Kriegsmarine) with the loss of eight of her 64 crew.
Cornwallis	Canada	World War II: The cargo ship was torpedoed and damaged Bridgetown, Barbados (13°05′N 59°36′W) by U-514 (Kriegsmarine). Cornwallis was repaired, and returned to service in August 1943.
Delães	Portugal	World War II: The schooner was shelled and sunk in the Atlantic Ocean (50°03′N 29°32′W) by U-96 (Kriegsmarine). Her 54 crew survived.
Empire Dawn	United Kingdom	World War II: The cargo ship was shelled and sunk in the Atlantic Ocean south west of Cape Town, Union of South Africa by Michel (Kriegsmarine). The attack continued after the ship surrendered. Michel's captain, Helmuth von Ruckteschell was convicted of a war crime for this incident. Empire Dawn was on a voyage from Durban, Union of South Africa to Trinidad.
Fjordaas	Norway	World War II: Convoy ON 127: The tanker was torpedoed and damaged in the Atlantic Ocean (51°16′N 29°08′W) by U-218 (Kriegsmarine) and was abandoned by her crew. She was later reboarded and reached the Clyde on 15 September. She was subsequently repaired, and returned to service in December 1942.
Helgeland	United States	The schooner was sighted at Port Vita, Raspberry Island, Territory of Alaska (58°03′50″N 153°04′20″W). She subsequently disappeared with the loss of all ten crew.
Hindanger	Norway	World War II: Convoy ON 127: The cargo ship was torpedoed and damaged in the Atlantic Ocean (49°39′N 32°24′W) by U-584 (Kriegsmarine) with the loss of one of her 40 crew. Survivors were rescued by HMCS Amherst (Royal Canadian Navy), which scuttled the ship.
Hokusho Maru	Japan	World War II: The cargo ship was torpedoed and sunk in the Pacific Ocean off the Marshall Islands by USS Narwhal (United States Navy).
Kanto Maru	Imperial Japanese Navy	World War II: The Kansai Maru-class auxiliary aircraft transport was torpedoed and sunk in the central Makassar Straits, 30 nautical miles (56 km) northwest of Kendari, Celebes, Netherlands East Indies (03°15′S 118°27′E) by USS Saury (United States Navy) with the loss of 39 lives.
Yayoi	Imperial Japanese Navy	Yayoi under attack World War II: The Mutsuki-class destroyer was bombed and sunk in the Solomon Sea 8 nautical miles (15 km) northwest of Vakuta, Trobriand Islands, Papua New Guinea (08°45′S 151°25′E) by Boeing B-17 Flying Fortress and North American B-25 Mitchell aircraft of the United States Army Air Force and Lockheed Hudson aircraft of the Royal Australian Air Force; Sixty-eight of her crew were killed' Eighty-three survivors were rescued on 26 September from Normanby Island by Isokaze and Mochizuki (both Imperial Japanese Navy).

== 12 September ==
List of shipwrecks: 12 September 1942
Ship	State	Description
Bonden	Finland	World War II: Continuation War: The cargo ship was torpedoed and sunk south of Mariehamn, Åland (59°55′N 19°54′E) by Shch-309 (Soviet Navy).
Empire Moonbeam	United Kingdom	World War II: Convoy ON 127: The cargo ship straggled behind the convoy. She was torpedoed and damaged in the Atlantic Ocean by U-211 (Kriegsmarine). She was then torpedoed and sunk by U-608 (Kriegsmarine) at 48°55′N 33°38′W with the loss of three of her 55 crew. Survivors were rescued by HMCS Arvida (Royal Canadian Navy).
Hektoria	United Kingdom	World War II: Convoy ON 127: The whale factory ship straggled behind the convoy. She was torpedoed and damaged in the Atlantic Ocean by U-211 (Kriegsmarine). She was then torpedoed and sunk by U-608 (Kriegsmarine) at 48°55′N 33°38′W with the loss of one of her 85 crew. Survivors were rescued by HMCS Arvida (Royal Canadian Navy).
Hera	Finland	World War II: Continuation War: The cargo ship was torpedoed and sunk north of Åland (60°56′N 19°06′E) by S-13 (Soviet Navy).
Ida S.	Italy	World War II: The sailing vessel (24 GRT) was stopped by gunfire and then sunk by scuttling charges off La Maddelena, Sardinia by HMS Sahib (Royal Navy). Her four crew abandonned ship and reached shore.
Jussi H.	Finland	World War II: Continuation War: The cargo ship was torpedoed and sunk off Öregrund, Sweden (60°21′N 18°00′E) by S-13 (Soviet Navy). Only one of her 23 crew survived.
Laconia	United Kingdom	World War II: Laconia Incident: The troopship, carrying British and Polish troops, civilians and Italian prisoners of war, was torpedoed and sunk in the South Atlantic near Ascension Island at 5°05′S 11°38′W by U-156 (Kriegsmarine). Of those on board, 1,658 were killed and 1,083 rescued by Vichy French ships.
Lima	Sweden	World War II: The cargo ship (3,764 GRT) was torpedoed and sunk in the Atlantic Ocean off the coast of Liberia (2°35′N 11°22′W) by U-506 (Kriegsmarine) with the loss of three of her 33 crew.
Niyo Maru	Japan	World War II: The cargo ship was bombed and sunk off the coast of Burma by Royal Air Force aircraft.
Sperrbrecher A	Kriegsmarine	World War II: The sperrbrecher struck a mine and sank in Porsangerfjord, Norway (70°43′N 25°58′E). A crew member was killed.
Sperrbrecher 14 Bockenheim	Kriegsmarine	World War II: The auxiliary minesweeper struck a mine and sank at Honningsvåg, Norway. She was later refloated.
Stanvac Melbourne	Panama	World War II: The tanker was torpedoed and sunk in the Atlantic Ocean off Trinidad (10°30′N 60°20′W) by U-515 (Kriegsmarine) with the loss of one of her 49 crew.
Trevilly	United Kingdom	World War II: The cargo ship was torpedoed and sunk in the Atlantic Ocean (4°30′S 7°50′W) by U-68 (Kriegsmarine) with the loss of two of the 53 people on board. Two survivors were taken by U-68 as prisoners of war. Others were rescued by Cubango (Portugal) and Dumont d'Urville (Vichy French Navy) or reached land in their lifeboat.
U-88	Kriegsmarine	World War II: The Type VIIC submarine was depth charged and sunk in the Arctic Ocean south of Spitzbergen, Norway by HMS Faulknor (Royal Navy) with the loss of all 46 crew.
Woensdrecht	Netherlands	World War II: The tanker was torpedoed and damaged in the Atlantic Ocean south west of Trinidad (10°27′N 60°17′W) by U-515 (Kriegsmarine) with the loss of one of the 74 people on board, a survivor from Cressington Court (United Kingdom). Survivors were rescued by two United States Navy patrol boats. U-515 fired three more torpedoes at Woensdrecht, which broke in two. The stern section sank and the bow section was towed to Trinidad. She was declared a total loss.

== 13 September ==
List of shipwrecks: 13 September 1942
Ship	State	Description
Africander	Panama	World War II: Convoy PQ 18: The cargo ship (5,441 GRT) was torpedoed and sunk in the Grenland Sea (76°00′N 10°00′E) by a Luftwaffe aircraft. All 47 crew survived.
Empire Beaumont	United Kingdom	World War II: Convoy PQ 18: The cargo ship (7,044 GRT) was torpedoed and sunk in the Greenland Sea (76°10′N 10°05′E) by aircraft of Kampfgeschwader 26, Luftwaffe. Five crew and one passenger were killed. There were 36 survivors.
Empire Lugard	United Kingdom	World War II: Convoy TAG 5: The cargo ship (7,241 GRT) was torpedoed and sunk in the Atlantic Ocean (12°07′N 63°32′W) by U-558 (Kriegsmarine). Her 47 crew were rescued by Vilja (Norway). She was on a voyage from Trinidad to Guantánamo Bay, Cuba.
Empire Stevenson	United Kingdom	World War II: Convoy PQ 18: The cargo ship (6,209 GRT) was torpedoed and sunk in the Greenland Sea off Bear Island, Norway (76°10′N 10°05′E) by Luftwaffe aircraft with all 59 hands (40 crew and 19 gunners).
John Penn	United States	World War II: Convoy PQ 18: The Liberty ship (7,176 GRT) was torpedoed and sunk in the Greenland Sea (76°00′N 10°15′E) by Luftwaffe aircraft. Three crew were killed. There were 62 survivors.
Macbeth	Panama	World War II: Convoy PQ 18: The cargo ship (4,935 GRT) was damaged in the Greenland Sea (76°05′N 10°00′E) by two torpedoes from a Heinkel He 111 aircraft of the Luftwaffe and was scuttled by convoy escorts. There were no casualties. All 38 crew and 11 gunners were rescued.
Mars	United States	The tug (278 GRT) collided with Bidwell (United States) and sank east of Manomet Point, Plymouth, Massachusetts (41°56′16″N 070°29′33″W). There were no fatalities.
Nimba	Panama	World War II: The cargo ship (1,854 GRT) was torpedoed and sunk in the Atlantic Ocean (10°41′N 60°24′W) by U-515 (Kriegsmarine) with the loss of twenty of her 32 crew. Survivors were rescued by USS Barney (United States Navy).
Ocean Vanguard	United Kingdom	World War II: The Ocean ship was torpedoed and sunk in the Atlantic Ocean (10°43′N 60°11′W) by U-515 (Kriegsmarine) with the loss of eleven of her 51 crew. Survivors were rescued by Braga (Norway).
Oliver Ellsworth	United States	World War II: Convoy PQ 18: The Liberty ship was torpedoed and damaged in the Greenland Sea (76°10′N 10°05′E) by U-408 (Kriegsmarine) with the loss of one of her 70 crew. Survivors were rescued by Copeland (United Kingdom and HMT St. Kenan, which scuttled her.
Oregonian	United States	World War II: Convoy PQ 18: The cargo ship was torpedoed and sunk in the Greenland Sea off Bear Island (76°00′N 09°30′E) by Luftwaffe aircraft with the loss of 24 of her 53 crew.
Patrick J. Hurley	United States	World War II: The tanker was torpedoed and sunk in the Atlantic Ocean 950 nautical miles (1,760 km) north east of Barbados (22°59′N 46°15′W) by U-512 (Kriegsmarine) with the loss of four gunners and thirteen of her crew. Twenty-two survivors were rescued by Etna (Sweden on 19 September, and 23 by Loch Dee (United Kingdom) on 2 October.
Stalingrad	Soviet Union	World War II: Convoy PQ 18: The cargo ship (3,559 GRT) was torpedoed and sunk in the Greenland Sea (75°52′N 7°55′E) by U-408 (Kriegsmarine) with the loss of 21 of her 88 crew. Survivors were rescued by Royal Navy minesweepers.
Stone Street	Panama	World War II: Convoy ON 127: The cargo ship straggled behind the convoy. She was torpedoed and sunk in the Atlantic Ocean (48°18′N 39°43′W) by U-594 (Kriegsmarine) with the loss of thirteen of her 52 crew. Survivors were rescued by Irish Larch (Ireland).
Sukhona	Soviet Union	World War II: Convoy PQ 18: The cargo ship was sunk north west of Bear Island by torpedoes from a Heinkel He 111 aircraft of the Luftwaffe.
Suriname	Netherlands	World War II: Convoy TAG 5: The cargo ship was torpedoed and sunk in the Caribbean Sea (12°07′N 63°32′W) by U-558 (Kriegsmarine) with the loss of thirteen of her 82 crew. Survivors were rescued by a United States Navy ship.
Vilja	Norway	World War II: Convoy TAG 5: The tanker was torpedoed and damaged in the Caribbean Sea (12°15′N 62°52′W) by U-558 (Kriegsmarine). Her 34 crew abandoned ship but later reboarded her and sailed to Port of Spain, Trinidad, rescuing the survivors from Empire Lugard (United Kingdom) on the way. Vilja reached New Orleans, Louisiana on 16 January 1943 and was declared a constructive total loss. She was scrapped in July 1944.

== 14 September ==
List of shipwrecks: 14 September 1942
Ship	State	Description
Alabastro	Regia Marina	World War II: The Acciaio-class submarine (712 GRT) was sunk off Algiers, Algeria (37°28′N 04°34′E) by a Short Sunderland aircraft of 202 Squadron, Royal Air Force with the loss of all 44 hands.
Atheltemplar	United Kingdom	World War II: Convoy PQ 18: The tanker was torpedoed and damaged in the Greenland Sea south of Bear Island, Norway by U-457 (Kriegsmarine) with the loss of three of her 61 crew. Survivors were rescued by Copeland (United Kingdom) and HMS Offa (Royal Navy). HMS Harrier (Royal Navy) attempted to scuttle the ship, but was unsuccessful. Atheltemplar was later shelled and sunk at 76°10′N 18°00′E by U-408 (Kriegsmarine).
HMS Coventry	Royal Navy	World War II: Operation Agreement: The C-class cruiser was bombed and damaged in the Mediterranean Sea north west of Alexandria, Egypt, by Junkers Ju 87 aircraft of the Luftwaffe. She was scuttled by HMS Zulu (Royal Navy).
F 159	Kriegsmarine	The Type A Marinefahrprahm (155 GRT) sank in a storm northeast of Derna, Lybia. The crew was saved by F 354 (Kriegsmarine).
Harborough	United Kingdom	World War II: The cargo ship was torpedoed and sunk in the Atlantic Ocean 40 nautical miles (74 km) east of Galera Point, Trinidad (10°03′N 60°20′W) by U-515 (Kriegsmarine) with the loss of five of her 50 crew.
I / 43	Kriegsmarine	World War II: The flak boat was sunk at Tobruk, Libya by shore-based artillery. Survivors were taken as prisoners of war.
HMS ML 352	Royal Navy	World War II: Operation Agreement: The Fairmile B motor launch was sunk in the Mediterranean Sea off Tobruk, Libya by Macchi C.202 aircraft of the Regia Aeronautica.
HMS ML 353	Royal Navy	World War II: Operation Agreement: The Fairmile B motor launch was sunk in the Mediterranean Sea off Tobruk.
HMS MTB 308, HMS MTB 310, and HMS MTB 312	all Royal Navy	World War II: Operation Agreement: The Elco 77'-class motor torpedo boats were bombed and sunk in the Mediterranean Sea by Luftwaffe or Regia Aeronautica aircraft.
HMS MTB 314	Royal Navy	World War II: Operation Agreement: The Elco 77'-class motor torpedo boat) was run aground and abandoned, possibly sunk, off Tobruk. She was salvaged by the Germans and put into Kriegsmarine service as RA-10.
Mary Luckenbach	United States	World War II: Convoy PQ 18: The cargo ship exploded and sank 600 nautical miles (1,100 km) west of North Cape, Norway (76°00′N 16°00′E) during a Luftwaffe air attack when her cargo of 1,000 tons of TNT exploded. All 24 gunners and 41 crewmen were killed.
HMCS Ottawa	Royal Canadian Navy	World War II: Convoy ON 127: The C-class destroyer was torpedoed and sunk in the Atlantic Ocean (47°55′N 43°27′W) by U-91 (Kriegsmarine) with the loss of 114 of her 183 crew.
HMS Sikh	Royal Navy	World War II: Operation Agreement: The Tribal-class destroyer was shelled and sunk in the Mediterranean Sea off Tobruk with the loss of 115 of her 190 crew.
Sperrbrecher 142 Westerbroek	Kriegsmarine	World War II: The Sperrbrecher struck a mine and sank in the English Channel off Ostend, West Flanders, Belgium.
U-589	Kriegsmarine	World War II: The Type VIIC submarine was depth charged and sunk in the Arctic Ocean by a Fairey Swordfish aircraft of 825 Squadron, Fleet Air Arm based on HMS Avenger Royal Navy) and also by HMS Onslow (Royal Navy) with the loss of all 44 crew.
Wacosta	United States	World War II: Convoy PQ 18: The cargo ship was disabled by concussion from the explosion of Mary Luckenbach (United States), later torpedoed and sunk west of North Cape (76°05′N 16°00′E) by Luftwaffe aircraft without casualties.
HMS Zulu	Royal Navy	World War II: Operation Agreement: The Tribal-class destroyer was bombed and damaged in the Mediterranean Sea off Tobruk by Macchi C.200 aircraft of the Regia Aeronautica. She sank the next day.

== 15 September ==
List of shipwrecks: 15 September 1942
Ship	State	Description
Breedijk	Netherlands	World War II: The cargo ship was torpedoed and sunk in the Atlantic Ocean (5°05′S 8°54′W) by U-68 (Kriegsmarine) with the loss of two of the 52 people on board. Three survivors were taken as prisoners of war; others were rescued by Cubango (Portugal), Royal Navy vessels or reached land in their lifeboats.
Inger Elisabeth	Norway	World War II: Convoy SQ-36: The cargo ship was torpedoed and sunk in the Atlantic Ocean 4 nautical miles (7.4 km) off Cap-des-Rosiers, Quebec, Canada (48°49′N 64°06′W) by U-517 (Kriegsmarine) with the loss of three of her 26 crew.
Kioto	United Kingdom	World War II: The cargo ship was torpedoed and damaged in the Atlantic Ocean east of Tobago (11°05′N 60°46′W) by U-514 (Kriegsmarine). She went aground at Columbus Point. U-514 shelled her the next day and she burnt out with the loss of twenty of her 74 crew. Survivors were rescued by Trinidad ( Trinidad).
HMS LCP(L) 29,	Royal Navy	The Landing Craft, Personnel Large) was lost on this date.
HMS LCP(R) 617	Royal Navy	The Landing Craft, Personnel (Ramped) was lost on this date.
USS O'Brien	United States Navy	World War II: The Sims-class destroyer was torpedoed and damaged in the Pacific Ocean near Guadalcanal, Solomon Islands by I-19 (Imperial Japanese Navy). She sank on 19 October between Suva, Fiji and Pago Pago, American Samoa due to damage inflicted. Her crew were rescued.
R 66	Kriegsmarine	World War II: The Räumboot struck a mine and sank in the Gulf of Finland.
Ravens Point	United Kingdom	World War II: The cargo ship was sunk at Gibraltar by Italian frogmen. She was raised, repaired and returned to service in 1943.
Saturnus	Netherlands	World War II: Convoy SQ-36: The cargo ship was torpedoed and sunk in the Gulf of St. Lawrence 4 nautical miles (7.4 km) off Cap-des-Rosiers (48°49′N 64°06′W) by U-517 (Kriegsmarine) with the loss of one of her 36 crew.
Sonderberg	Germany	World War II: The factory ship was bombed and severely damaged at Cherbourg, Manche, France by Douglas Boston aircraft of 107 Squadron, Royal Air Force. Gutted by fire, she was subsequently scuttled as a blockship in June 1944. The wreck was dispersed by explosives in January 1947.
Sørholt	Norway	World War II: The cargo ship was torpedoed and sunk in the Atlantic Ocean (10°45′N 60°00′W) by U-515 (Kriegsmarine) with the loss of seven of the 38 people on board. Survivors were rescued by Royal Navy motor torpedo boats.
Star No. 71	United States	The scow sank off the coast of the Territory of Alaska.
U-261	Kriegsmarine	World War II: The Type VIIC submarine was depth charged and sunk in the Atlantic Ocean west of the Shetland Islands, United Kingdom (59°50′N 9°28′W) by an Armstrong Whitworth Whitley aircraft of 58 Squadron, Royal Air Force with the loss of all 43 crew.
USS Wasp	United States Navy	USS Wasp World War II: The Wasp-class aircraft carrier was torpedoed and damaged in the Pacific Ocean near Guadalcanal by I-19 (Imperial Japanese Navy) with the loss of 193 of her 2,167 crew. She was scuttled by USS Lansdowne (United States Navy).

== 16 September ==
List of shipwrecks: 16 September 1942
Ship	State	Description
Commercial Trader	United States	World War II: The Design 1099 ship (2,606 GRT) was torpedoed and sunk in the Atlantic Ocean 75 nautical miles (139 km) east of Trinidad (10°30′N 60°15′W) by U-558 (Kriegsmarine) with the loss of nine of her 38 crew. One of the survivors died 8 days later in hospital.
Empire Soldier	United Kingdom	World War II: Convoy SC 100: The cargo ship was sunk in the Atlantic Ocean east of St. John's, Dominion of Newfoundland (47°35′N 51°44′W) in a collision with F. J. Wolfe (United Kingdom).
Joannis	Greece	World War II: Convoy SQ-36: The cargo ship (3,667 GRT) was torpedoed and sunk in the Gulf of Saint Lawrence (49°10′N 67°05′W) by U-165 (Kriegsmarine). Her 32 crew survived.
Ocean Honour	United Kingdom	World War II: The Ocean ship was torpedoed, shelled, and sunk in the Gulf of Aden (12°48′N 50°50′E) by I-29 (Imperial Japanese Navy) with the loss of 21 of her 54 crew. Survivors were rescued from a remote island by Royal Air Force aircraft.
HMS Talisman	Royal Navy	World War II: The T-class submarine struck a mine and sank in the Sicilian Passage with the loss of all 63 crew.
U-457	Kriegsmarine	World War II: The Type VIIC submarine (1,070 GRT) was depth charged and sunk in the Barents Sea (75°05′N 43°15′E) by HMS Impulsive (Royal Navy) with the loss of all 45 crew.

== 17 September ==
List of shipwrecks: 17 September 1942
Ship	State	Description
Astrid	Denmark	World War II: The cargo ship struck a mine and sank in the Skaggerak 15 nautical miles (28 km) south east of the Hals Lighthouse. Her crew survived. She was salvaged in 1943.
Carbonia	Italy	World War II: The cargo ship was bombed and sunk in the Mediterranean Sea, 4 nautical miles (7.4 km) off Hammamet, Tunisia by British aircraft.
V-39 Giovanna	Regia Marina	World War II: The auxiliary submarine chaser was sunk off Misurata, Libya with gunfire from HMS United (Royal Navy).
Karpfanger	Germany	World War II: The cargo ship was torpedoed and sunk south of Egersund, Norway (58°41′N 5°30′E) by Handley Page Hampden aircraft of 489 Squadron, Royal New Zealand Air Force. Twenty-three survivors were rescued by M 5209 (Kriegsmarine).
Mae	United States	World War II: The cargo ship was torpedoed and sunk in the Atlantic Ocean 41 nautical miles (76 km) north of Georgetown, British Guiana (8°03′N 58°13′W) by U-515 (Kriegsmarine) with the loss of one of her 41 crew. Survivors were rescued by Gypsum King (United Kingdom and Sørvangen (Norway).
Peterton	United Kingdom	World War II: The cargo ship was torpedoed and sunk in the Atlantic Ocean north west of the Cape Verde Islands, Portugal (18°45′N 29°15′W) by U-109 (Kriegsmarine) with the loss of nine of her 43 crew. Survivors were rescued by HMS Canna (Royal Navy) and Empire Whimbrel (United Kingdom).
Rostro	Italy	World War II: The salvage vessel was sunk with gunfire by HMS United (Royal Navy) off Zliten, Libya.
HMT Waterfly	Royal Navy	World War II: The naval trawler was bombed and sunk in the English Channel off Dungeness, Kent by Axis aircraft.

== 18 September ==
List of shipwrecks: 18 September 1942
Ship	State	Description
F 533	Kriegsmarine	World War II: The Type C Marinefahrprahm was bombed and sunk in the Black Sea by Ilyushin Il-4 aircraft of the Soviet Naval Air Force.
FZ-3 Grö 1	Kriegsmarine	World War II: The minesweeping boat was bombed and sunk in the Black Sea by Ilyushin Il-4 aircraft of the Soviet Naval Air Force.
Kentucky	United States	World War II: Convoy PQ 18: The cargo ship was attacked by Luftwaffe aircraft 35 miles (56 km) off Cape Kanan, Soviet Union (68°45′N 43°30′E) and was abandoned. Her 71 crew survived; they were rescued by two British minesweepers. Kentucky came ashore and was declared a total loss.
Norfolk	Canada	World War II: The cargo ship was torpedoed and sunk in the Atlantic Ocean north east of Georgetown, British Guiana (8°36′N 59°20′W) by U-175 (Kriegsmarine) with the loss of six of her 19 crew. Survivors were rescued by Indauchu (Spain).
Olaf Fostenes	Norway	World War II: Convoy ON 129: The cargo ship was torpedoed and sunk in the Atlantic Ocean (44°56′N 41°05′W) by U-380 (Kriegsmarine). Her 36 crew were rescued by HMS Firedrake (Royal Navy).
Waalhaven	Netherlands	The cargo ship was wrecked on the Pinngrund, off the Rönnskär Lighthouse, Finland.

== 19 September ==
List of shipwrecks: 19 September 1942
Ship	State	Description
HMT Alouette	Royal Navy	World War II: The naval trawler was torpedoed and sunk in the Atlantic Ocean 10 nautical miles (19 km) west of Cape Espichel, Portugal by U-552 (Kriegsmarine) with the loss of fourteen of her 44 crew.
Monte Gorbea	Spain	World War II: The cargo ship was torpedoed and sunk in the Atlantic Ocean 60 nautical miles (110 km) east of Martinique (14°55′N 60°00′W) by U-512 (Kriegsmarine) with the loss of 52 of the 77 people on board.
Mount Pera	Greece	The cargo ship was wrecked on the Dane Reef, off Lourenço Marques, Mozambique and broke in two. The stern section sank.
HMT Pentland Firth	Royal Navy	World War II: The naval trawler was sunk in the Atlantic Ocean off of the Ambrose Lightship ( United States Lighthouse Service) off Sandy Hook, New Jersey (40°25′N 73°55′W) in a collision with USS Chaffinch (United States Navy).
Quebec City	United Kingdom	World War II: The cargo ship was torpedoed and sunk in the Atlantic Ocean (2°12′S 17°36′W) by U-156 (Kriegsmarine) with the loss of five of her 46 crew. Survivors were rescued by HMS Decoy (Royal Navy).
Shirogane Maru	Imperial Japanese Navy	World War II: The Kogane Maru-class transport ship was torpedoed and damaged in the Bougainville Strait, 11 miles (18 km) east of Lulaui Point, Bougainville Island, Papua New Guinea (06°33′S 156°05′E) by USS Amberjack (United States Navy). Three crewmen were killed. The ship was towed to Buin and beached on 20 September. She was unloaded but still could not be refloated and was abandoned on 16 October 1942.
Wichita	United States	World War II: The cargo ship was torpedoed and sunk in the Atlantic Ocean 300 nautical miles (560 km) northeast of Barbados by U-516 (Kriegsmarine) with the loss of all 50 crew.

== 20 September ==
List of shipwrecks: 20 September 1942
Ship	State	Description
M 4448 Antoine Henriette	Kriegsmarine	World War II: The auxiliary minesweeper struck a mine in the Bay of Biscay and sank, or was beached.
Diamant	Kriegsmarine	The cargo ship was wrecked on the Dogs Nest rocks, off St Helier, Jersey, Channel Islands
Empire Hartebeeste	United Kingdom	World War II: Convoy SC 100: The Design 1013 ship was torpedoed and sunk in the Atlantic Ocean (56°20′N 38°10′W) by U-596 (Kriegsmarine). Her 46 crew were rescued by Norhauk and Rio Verde (both Norway).
HMS Leda	Royal Navy	World War II: Convoy QP 14: The Halcyon-class minesweeper was torpedoed and sunk in the Greenland Sea south west of Spitsbergen, Norway by U-435 (Kriegsmarine) with the loss of 45 of her crew. Survivors were rescued by Rathlin and Zamalek (both United Kingdom).
Reedpool	United Kingdom	World War II: The cargo ship was torpedoed and sunk in the Atlantic Ocean 240 nautical miles (440 km) south east of Trinidad (8°58′N 57°34′W) by U-515 (Kriegsmarine) with the loss of five of the 58 people on board. Survivors were rescued by Millie M. Masher (United Kingdom).
Silver Sword	United States	World War II: Convoy QP 14: The cargo ship was torpedoed and sunk in the Greenland Sea (75°52′N 0°20′W) by U-255 (Kriegsmarine) with the loss of one of her 64 crew. Survivors were rescued by Rathlin and Zamalek (both United Kingdom).
HMS Somali	Royal Navy	World War II: Convoy PQ 18: The Tribal-class destroyer was torpedoed and damaged in the Greenland Sea (74°40′N 2°00′W) by U-703 (Kriegsmarine). She was taken under tow by HMS Ashanti (Royal Navy), but broke her back and sank four days later at 69°00′N 15°30′W) with the loss of 67 of the 105 people on board.

== 21 September ==
List of shipwrecks: 21 September 1942
Ship	State	Description
Agnes	United States	The fishing vessel was destroyed by fire in Frederick Sound off Brothers Island, Territory of Alaska (57°18′N 133°50′W).
Aquila	Regia Marina	World War II: The auxiliary minesweeper was torpedoed and sunk in the Mediterranean Sea off the coast of Tunisia by HMS Unruffled (Royal Navy).
Koei Maru	Imperial Japanese Navy	World War II: The Kogi Maru-class net tender was torpedoed and sunk in the Pacific Ocean 22 miles (35 km) south of Truk South Pacific Mandate (06°54′N 151°51′E) by USS Trout (United States Navy). Twenty-three gunners were killed.
Liberia	Vichy France	World War II: The cargo ship was torpedoed and sunk in the Mediterranean Sea off the coast of Tunisia (35°36′N 11°09′E) by HMS Unruffled (Royal Navy).
Predsednik Kopajtic	Yugoslavia	World War II: The cargo ship was torpedoed and sunk in the Atlantic Ocean (8°30′N 59°30′W) by U-175 (Kriegsmarine) with the loss of three of her 31 crew.
HMS St Olaves	Royal Navy	The Saint-class tug was wrecked off Duncansby Head, Caithness.
Tone Maru	Japan	World War II: The cargo ship was torpedoed and sunk in the East China Sea, east of Shanghai, China (31°18′N 123°27′E) by USS Grouper (United States Navy).
U-446	Kriegsmarine	World War II: The Type VIIC submarine (1,070 GRT) struck a mine and sank in the Gulf of Danzig off Kahlberg (54°27′N 18°55′E). There were 23 dead and 18 survivors She was raised on 1 November, decommissioned on 12 the same month and used as test hulk until being scuttle on 3 May 1945.

== 22 September ==
List of shipwrecks: 22 September 1942
Ship	State	Description
Apuania	Italy	World War II: The cargo ship was bombed and damaged at Ras Hammamet, Tunisia by British aircraft. She was declared a total loss.
Bellingham	United States	World War II: Convoy QP 14: The cargo ship was torpedoed and sunk in the Greenland Sea west of Jan Mayen, Norway (71°23′N 11°03′W) by U-435 (Kriegsmarine). Her 75 crew were rescued by Rathlin (United Kingdom) or the convoy's escort ships.
Esso Williamsburg	United States	World War II: The tanker was torpedoed and damaged in the Atlantic Ocean 500 nautical miles (930 km) south of Cape Farewell, Greenland (53°12′N 41°00′W) by U-211 (Kriegsmarine) with the loss of all 60 crew. The drifting wreck was torpedoed and sunk on 3 October at 55°00′N 33°00′W by U-254 (Kriegsmarine).
RFA Gray Ranger	Royal Fleet Auxiliary	World War II: Convoy QP 14: The Ranger-class tanker was torpedoed and sunk in the Greenland Sea west of Jan Mayen (71°23′N 11°03′W) by U-435 (Kriegsmarine) with the loss of six of her 39 crew. Survivors were rescued by Rathlin (United Kingdom).
Leonardo Palomba	Italy	World War II: The cargo ship was torpedoed, shelled and sunk in the Mediterranean Sea 8 miles (13 km) off Kuriat, Tunisia by HMS Unruffled (Royal Navy).
Ocean Voice	United Kingdom	World War II: Convoy QP 14: The Ocean ship was torpedoed and sunk in the Greenland Sea (71°23′N 11°01′W) by U-435 (Kriegsmarine). All 89 people on board were rescued by HMS Seagull (Royal Navy) and Zamalek (United Kingdom).
Paul Luckenbach	United States	World War II: The cargo ship was torpedoed and sunk in the Indian Ocean 800 miles (1,300 km) off the coast of India (10°03′N 63°42′E) by I-29 (Imperial Japanese Navy). Her 61 crew survived.
RTShch-121	Soviet Navy	The K-15/M-17-class river minesweeping launch was sunk on this date.
Seidan	Kriegsmarine	The auxiliary patrol boat was sunk west of Novorssijsk, Soviet Union in unclear circumstances. She was raised in October.

== 23 September ==
List of shipwrecks: 23 September 1942
Ship	State	Description
Athelsultan	United Kingdom	World War II: Convoy SC 100: The tanker was torpedoed and sunk in the Atlantic Ocean south east of Cape Farewell, Greenland (58°42′N 33°38′W) by U-617 (Kriegsmarine) with the loss of 51 of her 61 crew. Survivors were rescued by HMS Nasturtuim (Royal Navy) and HMCS Weyburn (Royal Canadian Navy).
B D Co. No. 5	United States	The scow foundered in the Bering Sea near Sledge Island, Territory of Alaska (64°29′N 166°13′W).
Bruyère	United Kingdom	World War II: The cargo ship was torpedoed and sunk in the Atlantic Ocean 250 nautical miles (460 km) south west of Freetown, Sierra Leone (4°55′N 17°16′W) by U-125 (Kriegsmarine). Her 51 crew were rescued by HMS Decoy, HMS Petunia and HMT Sir Wistan (all Royal Navy).
Lindvangen	Norway	World War II: The cargo ship was torpedoed and sunk in the Atlantic Ocean south east of Trinidad (9°20′N 60°10′W) by U-515 (Kriegsmarine) with the loss of 15 of her 23 crew. Survivors were rescued by HMS Helene (Royal Navy).
HMAS Siesta	Royal Australian Navy	The patrol boat suffered an explosion and burned to the waterline at Fremantle, Western Australia. Four of her crew were injured.
Tennessee	United Kingdom	World War II: Convoy SC 100: The cargo ship was torpedoed and sunk in the Atlantic Ocean south east of Cape Farewell (58°40′N 33°41′W) by U-617 (Kriegsmarine) with the loss of fifteen of her 35 crew. Survivors were rescued by USCGC Ingham (United States Coast Guard) and HMS Nasturtium (Royal Navy).
Vibran	Norway	World War II: The refrigerated cargo ship was torpedoed and sunk in the Atlantic Ocean (42°45′N 42°45′W) by U-582 (Kriegsmarine) with the loss of all 56 people on board. Vibran was on a voyage from Cardiff, Glamorgan, United Kingdom to Halifax, Nova Scotia, Canada.
HMAS Voyager	Royal Australian Navy	World War II: The W-class destroyer ran aground off Portuguese Timor (09°15′S 125°45′E). She was discovered by the Japanese the next day. She was bombed and damaged beyond repair. HMAS Voyager was scuttled on 25 September. Her crew were rescued by HMAS Kalgoorlie and HMAS Warrnambool (both Royal Australian Navy).

== 24 September ==
List of shipwrecks: 24 September 1942
Ship	State	Description
Antinous	United States	World War II: The cargo ship was torpedoed and damaged in the Atlantic Ocean south east of Trinidad (8°58′N 59°33′W) by U-515 (Kriegsmarine). Antinous was abandoned by her 48 crew but was later reboarded. She was taken in tow by HMS Zwarte Zee (Royal Navy) but was torpedoed and sunk on 25 September by U-512 (Kriegsmarine). Her 47 crew survived and were rescued by HMS Zwarte Zee.
Defoe	United Kingdom	The cargo ship exploded, caught fire and was abandoned 600 nautical miles (1,100 km) west south west of Rockall, Inverness-shire (52°11′N 19°32′W), with the loss of six crew. Dafoe was on a voyage from Manchester, Lancashire to Famagusta, Cyprus. The wreck was sighted on 26 September at 51°00′N 18°10′W but was presumed to have subsequently sunk.
Everett	United States	The dredge was lost at Cape Pankof, Unimak Island, Aleutian Islands, Territory of Alaska.
Fiume	Italy	World War II: The cargo ship was torpedoed and sunk in the Aegean Sea 7 nautical miles (13 km) south east of Rhodes, Greece by Nereus (Hellenic Navy) with the loss of 214 of the 287 people on board.
John Winthrop	United States	World War II: Convoy ON 131: The Liberty ship straggled behind the convoy. She was torpedoed, shelled and sunk in the Atlantic Ocean (56°00′N 31°00′W) by U-619 (Kriegsmarine) with the loss of all 52 crew.
HMS LCP(R) 622	Royal Navy	The Landing Craft, Personnel (Ramped) was lost on this date.
Losmar	United States	World War II: The cargo ship was torpedoed and sunk in the Indian Ocean east of the One and a Half Degree Channel 08°06′N 74°23′E by I-165 (Imperial Japanese Navy) with the loss of 27 of her 48 crew.
Pennmar	United States	World War II: Convoy SC 100: The cargo ship straggled behind the convoy due to damaged steering gear. She was torpedoed and sunk in the Atlantic Ocean (58°12′N 34°35′W) by U-432 (Kriegsmarine) with the loss of two of her 62 crew. Survivors were rescued by USCGC Bibb ( United States Coast Guard).
Roumanie	Belgium	World War II: Convoy SC 100: The cargo ship straggled behind the convoy. She was torpedoed and sunk in the Atlantic Ocean (58°10′N 28°20′W) by U-617 (Kriegsmarine) with the loss of 42 of her 43 crew. The survivor was taken on board U-617 as a prisoner of war.
Sphinx	Egypt	World War II: The sailing ship was shelled and sunk in the Mediterranean Sea off Tiros, Lebanon by U-561 (Kriegsmarine).
Tai Maru	Japan	World War II: The cargo ship was torpedoed and sunk off the Sakhalin Islands, Soviet Union.
West Chetac	United States	World War II: The Design 1013 ship was torpedoed and sunk in the Atlantic Ocean 100 nautical miles (190 km) north of Georgetown, British Guiana (8°45′N 57°00′W) by U-175 (Kriegsmarine) with the loss of 31 of her 50 crew. Survivors were rescued by USS Roe (United States Navy).
Zwettel	Kriegsmarine	World War II: The barge was sunk by a mine in the Dnieper River Estuary at Berezan Island, Soviet Union.

== 25 September ==
List of shipwrecks: 25 September 1942
Ship	State	Description
Boston	United Kingdom	World War II: Convoy RB 1: The passenger ship was torpedoed and sunk in the Atlantic Ocean east of Cape Farewell, Greenland (54°23′N 27°54′W) by U-216 (Kriegsmarine). Her 65 crew were rescued by HMS Veteran (Royal Navy).
Empire Bell	United Kingdom	World War II: Convoy UR 42: The cargo ship was torpedoed and sunk in the Atlantic Ocean (62°19′N 15°27′W) by U-442 (Kriegsmarine) with the loss of ten of her 41 crew. Survivors were rescued by Lysaker IV (Norway).
Franz Bohmke	Germany	World War II: The cargo ship struck a mine and sank in the Öresund.
HMS LCV 798	Royal Navy	The Landing Craft, Vehicle was lost on this date.
Navigator	Finland	World War II: The cargo ship struck a mine and sank in the Baltic Sea off Trelleborg, Sweden.
Teibo Maru	Japan	World War II: The cargo ship was torpedoed, shelled, machine-gunned, and sunk in the South China Sea 90 kilometres (56 mi) south east of Cape Padaran, French Indochina (10°31′N 109°31′E) by USS Sargo (United States Navy). Forty survivors were rescued by Shimushu (Imperial Japanese Navy) on 26/27 September.
U-253	Kriegsmarine	World War II: The Type VIIC submarine struck a mine and sank in the Atlantic Ocean north west of Iceland (67°00′N 23°00′W) with the loss of all 45 crew.

== 26 September ==
List of shipwrecks: 26 September 1942
Ship	State	Description
I-33	Imperial Japanese Navy	The B1 type submarine sank at Truk, South Seas Mandate due to a loss of buoyancy from a bungled retrimming attempt while being repaired. thirty-three of her crew were killed. She was raised on 29 December 1942. Towed to Kure for repairs in March 1943. Repairs finished on 1 June 1944. She sank again in the Iyo Nada near Kure during diving trials on 16 June 1944.
M-60	Soviet Navy	World War II: The M-class submarine was sunk by a mine of a flanking barrage laid by the minelayers NMS Amiral Murgescu, NMS Regele Carol I and NMS Dacia (all Royal Romanian Navy).
New York	United Kingdom	World War II: Convoy RB 1: The passenger ship was torpedoed and sunk in the Atlantic Ocean (54°34′N 25°44′W) by U-91 (Kriegsmarine) with the loss of all 54 crew.
Tambour	Panama	World War II: The cargo ship was torpedoed and sunk in the Atlantic Ocean (8°50′N 59°50′W) by U-175 (Kriegsmarine) with the loss of eight of her 32 crew. Survivors were rescued by Thalatta (Norway).
HMS Veteran	Royal Navy	World War II: Convoy RB 1: The V-class destroyer was torpedoed and sunk in the Atlantic Ocean by U-404 (Kriegsmarine) with the loss of all 134 crew, and 63 of the 65 survivors from Boston (United Kingdom). The two survivors from Boston were rescued by New Bedford (United States).
Yorktown	United Kingdom	World War II: Convoy RB 1: The cargo ship was torpedoed and sunk in the Atlantic Ocean 550 nautical miles (1,020 km) west of the Butt of Lewis (55°10′N 18°50′W) by U-619 (Kriegsmarine) with the loss of eighteen of her 60 crew. Survivors were rescued by HMS Sardonyx (Royal Navy).

== 27 September ==
List of shipwrecks: 27 September 1942
Ship	State	Description
Francesco Barbaro	Italy	World War II: The cargo ship was torpedoed in the Ionian Sea off Navarino, Greece (37°15′N 19°55′E) by HMS Umbra (Royal Navy). She sank the next day with the loss of 30 of the 278 people on board.
Gazelle	Kriegsmarine	The patrol boat collided with Themis (Norway) and sank off Lervik, Norway.
Radio	United States	The fishing vessel was wrecked on a reef in Shuyak Strait (58°29′N 152°36′W) between Shuyak Island and Afognak Island, Territory of Alaska. Her nine crew survived.
Stephen Hopkins	United States	World War II: The Liberty ship and the auxiliary cruiser Stier (Kriegsmarine) shelled and sank each other in the South Atlantic Ocean at 28°08′S 11°59′W. The survivors of Stephen Hopkins reached Brazil in lifeboats a month later. During combat with Stier and the month-long ordeal in the lifeboats that followed it, 41 of the 55 men aboard Stephen Hopkins – 32 of 40 civilian crewmen and nine of the 15-man United States Navy Armed Guard detachment – died.
Stier	Kriegsmarine	World War II: The auxiliary cruiser and the Liberty ship Stephen Hopkins (United States) shelled and sank each other in the South Atlantic Ocean (28°08′S 11°59′W). Two of her crewmen were killed. Survivors from Stier were rescued by Tannenfels (Kriegsmarine).
U-165	Kriegsmarine	World War II: The Type IXC submarine was depth charged and sunk in the Bay of Biscay (47°00′N 5°30′W) by a Vickers Wellington aircraft of 311 Squadron, Royal Air Force with the loss of all 51 crew.

== 28 September ==
List of shipwrecks: 28 September 1942
Ship	State	Description
Alcoa Mariner	United States	World War II: The cargo ship was torpedoed and sunk in the Atlantic Ocean 20 nautical miles (37 km) off the mouth of the Orinoco River, Venezuela (8°57′N 60°08′W) by U-175 (Kriegsmarine). Her 54 crew were rescued by Turret Cape ( Canada).
Antonico	Brazil	World War II: The cargo ship was torpedoed and sunk in the Atlantic Ocean off the mouth to the Marowijne River (5°30′N 53°30′W) by U-516 (Kriegsmarine) with the loss of sixteen of her 40 crew.
HMS LCP(R) 1019	Royal Navy	The Landing Craft, Personnel (Ramped) was lost on this date.
Lagés	Brazil	World War II: The cargo ship was torpedoed and sunk in the Amazon Estuary 75 nautical miles (139 km) north of Salinas (0°13′N 47°47′W) by U-514 (Kriegsmarine) with the loss of three of her 49 crew. She was salvaged, repaired and returned to service post-war.
Nefco No. 2	United States	The scow sank in Prince William Sound off Naked Island, Territory of Alaska (60°40′N 147°25′W).
Nozima Maru	Japan	World War II: The cargo ship was bombed and sunk in Sogod Bay (10°30′N 125°00′E) by United States Army Air Force aircraft.
Ozório	Brazil	World War II: The Design 1074 ship was torpedoed and sunk in the Amazon Estuary 75 nautical miles (139 km) north of Salinas (0°03′N 47°45′W) by U-514 (Kriegsmarine) with the loss of five of her 39 crew. She was salvaged, repaired and returned to service post-war.
Tamon Maru No. 6	Japan	World War II: The cargo ship was torpedoed and sunk in the Pacific Ocean south of Hokkaido by USS Nautilus (United States Navy).

== 29 September ==
List of shipwrecks: 29 September 1942
Ship	State	Description
Banffshire	United Kingdom	World War II: The cargo ship was torpedoed and sunk in the Indian Ocean (9°26′N 71°20′E) by U-532 (Kriegsmarine) with the loss of one of the 100 people on board.
Baron Ogilvy	United Kingdom	World War II: The cargo ship was torpedoed and sunk in the Atlantic Ocean south west of Cape Palmas, Liberia (2°30′N 14°30′W) by U-125 (Kriegsmarine) with the loss of eight of her 40 crew. Mouzinho (Portugal) rescued all 32 survivors.
Franz Rudolf	Germany	World War II: The cargo ship was torpedoed and sunk in the Baltic Sea by Shch-310 (Soviet Navy).
V 312 Hanseat	Kriegsmarine	The Vorpostenboot ran aground and was wrecked.
Lifland	United Kingdom	World War II: Convoy SC 101: The cargo ship straggled behind the convoy. She was torpedoed and sunk in the Atlantic Ocean (56°40′N 30°30′W) by U-608 (Kriegsmarine) with the loss of all 29 crew.
Pavia	Yugoslavia	The cargo ship was driven ashore east of Point Radix, Trinidad. She was refloated but ran aground on the L'Ebrauche Rocks, 9 nautical miles (17 km) off Trinidad and was a total loss.
Registan	United Kingdom	World War II: The cargo ship was torpedoed and sunk in the Atlantic Ocean 140 nautical miles (260 km) off Barbados (12°37′N 57°10′W) by U-332 (Kriegsmarine) with the loss of 16 of her 54 crew. Survivors were rescued by Rio Neuquen (Argentina).
USS YC-898, and USS YC-899	United States Navy	The non-self-propelled covered lighters sank whilst under tow off Key West, Florida.

== 30 September ==
List of shipwrecks: 30 September 1942
Ship	State	Description
Alipore	United Kingdom	World War II: The cargo ship was torpedoed, shelled and sunk in the Atlantic Ocean north east of Georgetown, British Guiana (7°09′N 54°23′W) by U-516 (Kriegsmarine) with the loss of ten of her 83 crew. Survivors were rescued by the fishing schooner United Eagle (British Guiana).
Amiral Pierre	Vichy France	World War II: Battle of Madagascar: The cargo ship was intercepted in the Indian Ocean off Madagascar (26°04′S 34°54′E) by HMAS Nizam (Royal Australian Navy) and was scuttled. There were no casualties.
Camila	Panama	World War II: The cargo ship (1,201 GRT) was shelled and set on fire in the Indian Ocean (08°10′N 77°41′E) by I-166 (Imperial Japanese Navy). Her crew abandoned her, suffering only one wounded. She was later beached and declared a total loss.
Empire Avocet	United Kingdom	World War II: The cargo ship was torpedoed and sunk in the Atlantic Ocean off the coast of Liberia (4°05′N 13°23′W) by U-125 (Kriegsmarine) with the loss of two of her 56 crew. Two survivors were taken on board U-125 as prisoners of war, the rest were rescued by HMS Cowslip (Royal Navy).
Kumsang	United Kingdom	World War II: The passenger ship was torpedoed and sunk in the Atlantic Ocean 300 nautical miles (560 km) south of Freetown, Sierra Leone (4°07′N 13°40′W) by U-125 (Kriegsmarine) with the loss of four of the 114 people on board.
Siam II	United Kingdom	World War II: The cargo ship was torpedoed and damaged in the Atlantic Ocean south west of Monrovia, Liberia (3°25′N 15°46′W) by U-506 (Kriegsmarine). She was sunk by a coup de grâce in the early hours of 1 October. Her 39 crew were rescued by Nagpore (United Kingdom).

== Unknown date ==
List of shipwrecks: Unknown date 1942
Ship	State	Description
Gene	United States	The Motorboat was wrecked on Rye Island, Territory of Alaska.
No. 64	Soviet Navy	The Sh-4 Type motor torpedo boat was lost sometime in September.
PSB&D Co. #6	United States	The cargo scow was lost at Unimak Bight off Unimak Island, Territory of Alaska (54°35′N 164°10′W).
Smeraldo	Regia Marina	The Sirena-class submarine was lost in the Mediterranean Sea. Last report was received on 16 September off Sollum, Egypt.
