= German submarine U-175 =

German World War II submarine

- U-175 on the surface shortly before sinking.

History

Nazi Germany
- Name: U-175
- Ordered: 23 December 1939
- Builder: DeSchiMAG AG Weser, Bremen
- Yard number: 1015
- Laid down: 30 January 1941
- Launched: 2 September 1941
- Commissioned: 5 December 1941
- Fate: Sunk, 17 April 1943

General characteristics
- Class & type: Type IXC submarine
- Displacement: 1,120 t (1,100 long tons) surfaced; 1,232 t (1,213 long tons) submerged
- Length: 76.76 m (251 ft 10 in) o/a; 58.75 m (192 ft 9 in) pressure hull
- Beam: 6.76 m (22 ft 2 in) o/a; 4.40 m (14 ft 5 in) pressure hull
- Height: 9.60 m (31 ft 6 in)
- Draught: 4.70 m (15 ft 5 in)
- Installed power: 4,400 PS (3,200 kW; 4,300 bhp) (diesels); 1,000 PS (740 kW; 990 shp) (electric)
- Propulsion: 2 shafts; 2 × diesel engines; 2 × electric motors
- Speed: 18.3 knots (33.9 km/h; 21.1 mph) surfaced; 7.3 knots (13.5 km/h; 8.4 mph) submerged
- Range: 13,450 nmi (24,910 km; 15,480 mi) at 10 knots (19 km/h; 12 mph) surfaced; 63 nmi (117 km; 72 mi) at 4 knots (7.4 km/h; 4.6 mph) submerged
- Test depth: 200 m (660 ft)
- Complement: 4 officers, 44 enlisted
- Armament: 6 × torpedo tubes (4 bow, 2 stern); 22 × 53.3 cm (21 in) torpedoes; 1 × 10.5 cm (4.1 in) SK C/32 deck gun (180 rounds); 1 × 3.7 cm (1.5 in) SK C/30 AA gun; 1 × 2 cm FlaK 30 AA guns

Service record
- Part of: 4th U-boat Flotilla; 5 December 1941 – 31 August 1942; 10th U-boat Flotilla; 1 September 1942 – 17 April 1943
- Identification codes: M 41 704
- Commanders: K.Kapt. Heinrich Bruns; 5 December 1941 – 17 April 1943
- Operations: 3 patrols: 1st patrol: 15 August – 17 October 1942; 2nd patrol; 1 December 1942 – 24 February 1943; 3rd patrol: 10 – 17 April 1943
- Victories: 10 merchant ships sunk (40,619 GRT)

German submarine U-175 was a Type IXC U-boat of Nazi Germany's Kriegsmarine built for service during World War II. She was laid down on 30 January 1941 at Bremen, and commissioned on 5 December 1941 with Kapitänleutnant Heinrich Bruns in command. After training with the 4th U-boat Flotilla, U-175 was transferred to the 10th U-boat Flotilla for front-line service. Throughout her career, the boat undertook three war patrols during which she sank ten merchant ships amounting to a total of 40,619 gross register tons (GRT) before being sunk by the US Coast Guard cutter Spencer on 17 April 1943.

== Construction and design ==
=== Construction ===
U-175 was ordered by the Kriegsmarine on 23 December 1939. She was constructed as part of Plan Z, a naval construction program that envisaged the acquisition of 249 U-boats along with numerous surface vessels by 1948, and which was in direct contravention of Germany's obligations under the Anglo-German Naval Agreement. The vessel's keel was laid down in the DeSchiMAG AG Weser shipyard in Bremen on 30 January 1941 at which point it became known by the yard number or designation 1015. Built alongside U-174 and U-176, the boat's crew was slowly assembled during construction, they were billeted within a building at the North German Lloyd Shipping Company, also in Bremen. After about nine months of construction U-175 was launched on 2 September 1941.

== Design ==
German Type IXC submarines were slightly larger than the original Type IXBs. U-174 had a displacement of 1,120 tonnes (1,100 long tons) when at the surface and 1,232 tonnes (1,213 long tons) while submerged. The U-boat had a total length of 76.76 m (251 ft 10 in), a pressure hull length of 58.75 m (192 ft 9 in), a beam of 6.76 m (22 ft 2 in), a height of 9.60 m (31 ft 6 in), and a draught of 4.70 m (15 ft 5 in). The submarine was powered by two MAN M 9 V 40/46 supercharged four-stroke, nine-cylinder diesel engines producing a total of 4,400 metric horsepower (3,240 kW; 4,340 shp) for use while surfaced, two Siemens-Schuckert 2 GU 345/34 double-acting electric motors producing a total of 1,000 metric horsepower (740 kW; 990 shp) for use while submerged. She had two shafts and two 1.92 m (6 ft) propellers. The boat was capable of operating at depths of up to 230 metres (750 ft).

The submarine had a maximum surface speed of 18.3 knots (33.9 km/h; 21.1 mph) and a maximum submerged speed of 7.3 knots (13.5 km/h; 8.4 mph). When submerged, the boat could operate for 63 nautical miles (117 km; 72 mi) at 4 knots (7.4 km/h; 4.6 mph); when surfaced, she could travel 13,450 nautical miles (24,910 km; 15,480 mi) at 10 knots (19 km/h; 12 mph). U-174 was fitted with six 53.3 cm (21 in) torpedo tubes (four fitted at the bow and two at the stern), 22 torpedoes, one 10.5 cm (4.13 in) SK C/32 naval gun, 180 rounds, and a 3.7 cm (1.5 in) SK C/30 as well as a 2 cm (0.79 in) C/30 anti-aircraft gun. The boat had a complement of forty-eight.

As part of the improvements of the IXC type over the previous IXBs, U-175 was able to carry an extra 43 tonnes of fuel, giving her a capacity of 208 tonnes. Her power plant was heavier than those in previous models, and in order to accommodate this and balance the boat, the engine room was built directly aft of the control room, as opposed to behind the galley like in other types. The periscope in the control room was also deleted, leaving the boat with just two of the optical devices, both of which were located in the conning tower.

== Service history ==
=== Working up ===
U-175 was commissioned into the Kriegsmarine on 5 December 1941 (Note: This varies from Haskell, who provides the date as 10 December 1941.) under the command of Kapitänleutnant Heinrich Bruns. Bruns graduated from the 1931 class and had previously commanded a torpedo boat, T3, which had been sunk by British aircraft in September 1940 near Le Havre. After recovering from his wounds, Bruns served on a training ship before transferring to the U-boat service in early 1941. Upon completion of the U-boat captain's course, Bruns served briefly on U-75, where he was confirmed as suitable for command. He was 29 years old upon taking up his post with U-175. British naval intelligence, which tried to maintain personality and psychological profiles on all U-boat commanders, assessed him as "too ambitious and incautious". Nevertheless, he was later described by his crew as a "'humane officer' with more concern for...his men than the niceties of military protocol" who was "strict, but fair" and "dedicated to running an efficient, contented boat".

Between 23 December 1941 and 6 January 1942, the boat was assigned to the 4th U-boat Flotilla where she carried out acceptance trials, doing so alongside four other boats commissioned around the same time. These were successfully completed and the boat was officially accepted. She was then sent to Gotenhafen to undertake torpedo exercises. Freezing temperatures, however, kept her there until late April. As they were ice-bound, the exercises were canceled; as such, the boat offloaded its crew to a depot ship, Frida Horn. They were finally able to complete their two week-long exercises in May off the coast of Hela in Poland. The following month she took part in tactical exercises, during which time one of her periscopes was damaged when she surfaced below a cutter. The result of this was that she was forced to put into Danzig for repairs before carrying out "silent-running tests" near Bornholm. These tests delivered bad news for U-175's crew as the boat proved to be "exceptionally noisy".

Throughout June and July, U-175 conducted a six-week "shake-down" at Stettin along with U-512 and U-181. During this time, the crew was based at Bredower Naval Barracks. With the working-up completed, the boat was fueled and took on board a consignment of 15 electric and eight air-cooled torpedoes before departing for Kiel on 27 July. Around this time the boat was reassigned to Gunther Kuhnke's 10th U-boat Flotilla for front-line service, although this only became official on 1 September.

=== First patrol: Trinidad ===
On 10 August 1942, (Note: There is some discrepancy in the dates that sources provide for U-175's departure. Blair states between 12 and 15 August, while other sources state 15 August.) under orders from the U-boat high command, Befehlshaber der U-Boote (BdU), U-175 departed Kiel along with a small escort and another U-boat – U-179. The two boats proceeded to an advanced base in Norway where they refueled two days later before continuing on their way to their operational assignments separately. Tasked with carrying out operations in the Windward Passage in the Caribbean Sea, Bruns took his boat into the North Atlantic between the Faroe Islands and Iceland and, after crash-diving to avoid an Allied aircraft, set sail towards Barbados. Shortly before their arrival, on 11 September, Bruns received orders from BdU to relocate his boat to the mouth of the Orinoco River and to carry out his patrols. After briefly patrolling around Bridgetown, where another U-boat had reported sinking two tankers earlier, U-175 took up station in its assigned area.

The haphazard defensive measures that had characterized the Allied convoy protection efforts in the region – and which had been taken advantage of so effectively during the early stages of Operation Neuland – had been rectified to some extent by the time U-175 arrived in the Caribbean. Nevertheless, the boat's first patrol in the area was a huge success. One of five Type IXs that were sent to the region, out of a total of 30 vessels that were sunk at this time, Bruns' boat accounted for nine, amounting to 33,442 GRT. The first of these came on 18 September when, after having hit but failed to sink the Norwegian freighter Sorvangen, U-175 sank the Norfolk, a Canadian freighter belonging to the Canada SS Line. Four American ships followed this, along with one Panamanian, a Yugoslavian and a British ship, with the final one, the William A. McKenney, being sunk on 5 October. Finally, on 7 October, having fired all of her torpedoes, U-175 received orders to end her patrol and make for the U-boat base at Lorient, in German-occupied France; crossing the Atlantic via the Little Antilles and the Azores, they arrived there on 27 October. (Note: Some sources state that the patrol ended on 17 October and that it lasted 64 days. Blair provides a count of 74 days, while Haskell states that the boat arrived at Lorient after 78 days at sea.) During the patrol, the boat had largely been unmolested by Allied aircraft, except for two attacks which occurred on 2 October, when she was bombed by a Martin PBM Mariner, (Note: One source identifies the aircraft as being a "D-18", but Haskell identifies it as being a PBM-5 Mariner from "VP-74".) but suffered only "light damage".

=== Second patrol: West Africa ===
Following U-175's arrival at Lorient, the crew received three weeks leave. In order to maintain a skeleton crew remaining behind, this was taken in shifts. During this time the boat was in the dry dock within the Scorff Shelter submarine pen. She stayed there for two days while her equipment was tested, then transferred to the Keroman shelter where the more extensive work was undertaken. This involved the removal and replacement of one of the periscopes, rebuilding the compressors, and overhauling the electric motors. The boat also received a Metox radar detector. By the end of November, the boat conducted short sea trials and was declared ready to undertake its next patrol.

This began on 1 December 1942, when late in the afternoon the boat, in concert with a type VIIC boat from Brest, was escorted out of Lorient towards the Isle de Groix. A brief period of panic was experienced by the crew when one of the lookouts mistook four porpoises for torpedoes and sounded an alarm, before realizing his mistake. A short time later, however, the boat was forced to submerge when the radar detector warned of an incoming Allied airplane. Bruns ordered a crash dive and resurfaced shortly afterwards, only to be harassed a number of times during the night by aircraft which began dropping depth charges at around 01:00 on 2 December. Most of these were aimed at the type VIIC boat that was traveling with U-175.

As they traversed the Bay of Biscay, U-175 was repeatedly forced to crash dive by approaching Allied aircraft. During this time the boat was plagued by almost constant leaking of sea water through its joints, which required tightening. On 4 December, after receiving a convoy sighting report from U-603 via BdU, Bruns decided to attempt an interception of the convoy, which was believed to be east of Cape Finisterre, even though by this time the exhaust valves on the diesel engines were leaking. After being forced to crash-dive upon being surprised by an Allied seaplane, the leaks forced Bruns to surface and eventually break off the attempt to join the attack.

The boat then proceeded to its patrol area off the coast of Freetown, Sierra Leone, traversing a track between Grand Canaria and Fuerteventura in the Canary Islands. On 8 December they encountered a neutral Spanish tanker, the Zorroza, which Bruns allowed to continue on its way. By 11 December, without having encountered any Allied ships, the crew had managed to repair the exhaust valves and after reporting this to BdU, Bruns received orders to proceed to the Cape Verde Islands, where no U-boat had previously been sent. The submarine arrived there on 12 December before moving on to a point west of Dakar. For the next month, U-175 patrolled the waters off the west coast of Africa as BdU attempted to move them into position to attack ships in the area. Staying underwater during the day, and sailing on the surface at night, they spotted a number of neutral vessels during this time, but left them alone. They were attacked once by an Allied aircraft on New Years Day; again very little damage was caused. (Note: Haskell describes this aircraft as a single-engine plane, while another source identifies it as a Catalina from No. 270 Squadron RAF.)

At 18:00 on 22 January 1943, U-175 spotted an unescorted American Liberty Ship, the Benjamin Smith. The first two torpedoes fired at the ship missed, Bruns decided that it was too dangerous to remain on the surface and decided to submerge in case Allied aircraft were about. After an hour, the boat surfaced and reacquired the target, then some 9 nautical miles (17 km; 10 mi) away and pursued it for eight hours. Early on 23 January U-175 scored a hit on the American vessel with the first torpedo fired, however, it continued sailing, so Bruns ordered another torpedo to be fired. This one missed, but a third struck below the mainmast and forced the crew to abandon ship. After questioning the crew in their lifeboats and pointing them in the direction of the nearest land, Bruns delivered the final blow to the Benjamin Smith by firing another torpedo which exploded amidships on the port side and sent the ship to the bottom.

Bruns then took his boat north to make a rendezvous with a Milchkuh replenishment vessel to complete refueling. However, while traveling on the surface they were surprised by a Catalina aircraft and only just managed to dive in time to avoid the depth charges that were dropped. On 30 January, after British intelligence learned of the rendezvous, U-175 was subjected to a heavy air attack which resulted in extensive damage and for a time the U-boat was diving out of control by the stern to a depth of 310 metres (1,020 ft), which was well beyond the hull's tested crush depth (the depth at which the hull collapsed, killing everyone aboard). An emergency release of ballast retrieved the situation, but resulted in the boat angling up abnormally out of the water. Upon coming to the surface, the boat was subjected to machine-gun fire which forced them to dive once more. Finally, late on 30 January, they resurfaced and made some hasty repairs which included rewiring the propellers so that they would both run off the starboard diesel engine; the port power plant had been badly damaged. The U-boat was then able to gingerly continue on its way. The attack had also breached one of the boat's fuel tanks and, as a result of a leak, the crew were forced to arrange an emergency resupply. This occurred on 15 February when U-175 rendezvoused with U-118, from whom she received about 30 tons of fuel as well spare parts for the radar system and fresh food. Following this Bruns set off directly for Lorient; moving on the surface at night, they arrived on 24 February 1943. They had been at sea for 86 days.

=== Third patrol: Atlantic ===
Upon their return to Lorient, which by that time had been heavily bombed by the Allies, the boat underwent repairs, first on its periscope and then the damaged port diesel and the electric motors. In addition to this new batteries were installed and the compressor was given a tune-up. Meanwhile, the crew were housed in air raid shelters rather than a barracks, as all the other accommodation had been destroyed. A number of crew members were sent away on promotion or training courses and in their place new personnel arrived. As a result, the crew composition changed considerably; the average age on board by the time of the third patrol was 23.

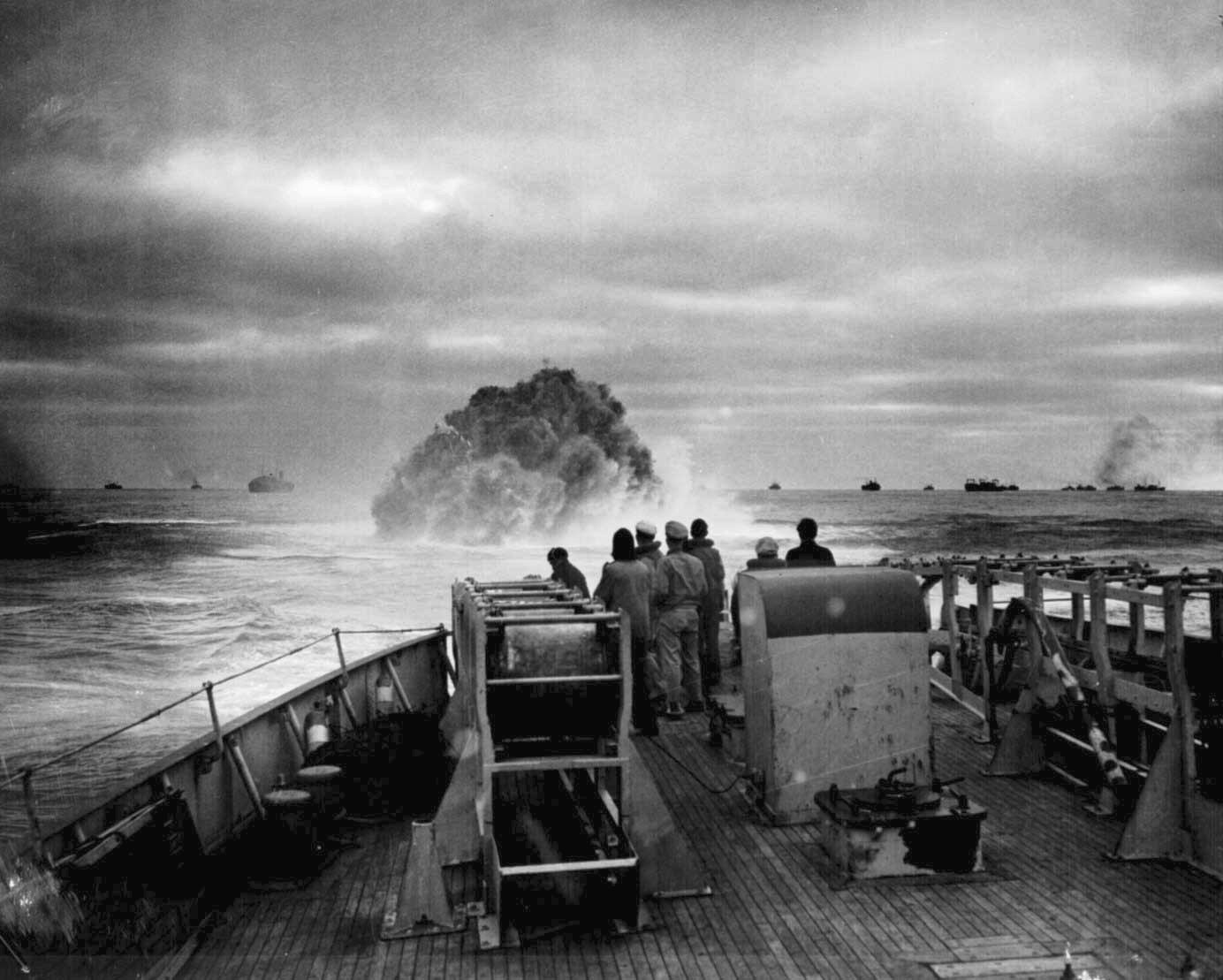
A view from the US Coast Guard cutter Spencer as it depth charged U-175

The boat's repairs took longer than expected and instead of being completed by 4 April, it was not until the tenth that the boat was ready to depart on its third patrol. Nevertheless, when she left, she did so with repairs incomplete and a number of dock workers remained on board to finish these off while at sea. Departing Lorient with an armed escort known as a Sperrbrecher and three anti-submarine vessels, U-175 proceeded independently after passing Ile de Groix. In the days that followed, a number of radar contacts sent the boat below the surface. However, by 15 April they had arrived in the Mid-Atlantic air gap where they were out of range of Allied aircraft, allowing them to operate on the surface with less circumspection. The following day, BdU ordered U-175 to join an attack on convoy HX 233, a Liverpool-bound convoy which had departed from Halifax and New York City earlier in the month, which had been spotted by U-262 while on a clandestine operation to pick up German prisoners-of-war. Steaming at full speed, the boat beat towards the convoy for 10 hours before finally spotting it just before midnight on 16 April. At this point Bruns reported the sighting to BdU, who relayed it to two other boats, U-382 and U-628, while Bruns attempted to get in front of the convoy to set up an attack. Four other boats – U-226, U-264, U-358 and U-614 – also subsequently converged on the convoy.

In the early morning of 17 April, U-628 torpedoed one of the freighters in the convoy, Fort Rampart. A short time later, one of the convoy's escorts, the United States Coast Guard cutter Spencer, under Commander Harold Berdine, responding to a signal from one of the other escorts, the corvette HMCS Arvida, moved away from the convoy to screen the cutter while it picked up survivors. Once this was completed, she steamed back towards the convoy. As she came back, she attempted to pass ahead of the convoy to take up her station, and in doing so found U-175 where she was sitting at periscope depth preparing to launch a submerged attack upon the G Harrison Smith, a tanker of 11,752 GRT. Picking up a contact on her sonar about 5,000 yards (4,600 m), she rushed ahead at full speed. The sound of the sonar pinging on the boat alerted Bruns to the danger and he gave the order for the boat to dive. However, Spencer launched a salvo of 11 depth charges which exploded above and below the boat. The result was that the boat went into a dive bow first and just as they began to restore buoyancy, Spencer launched a second salvo. This second attack ruptured U-175's pressure hull, destroyed the electric motors and damaged several batteries which, as a result, began to give off poisonous gas.

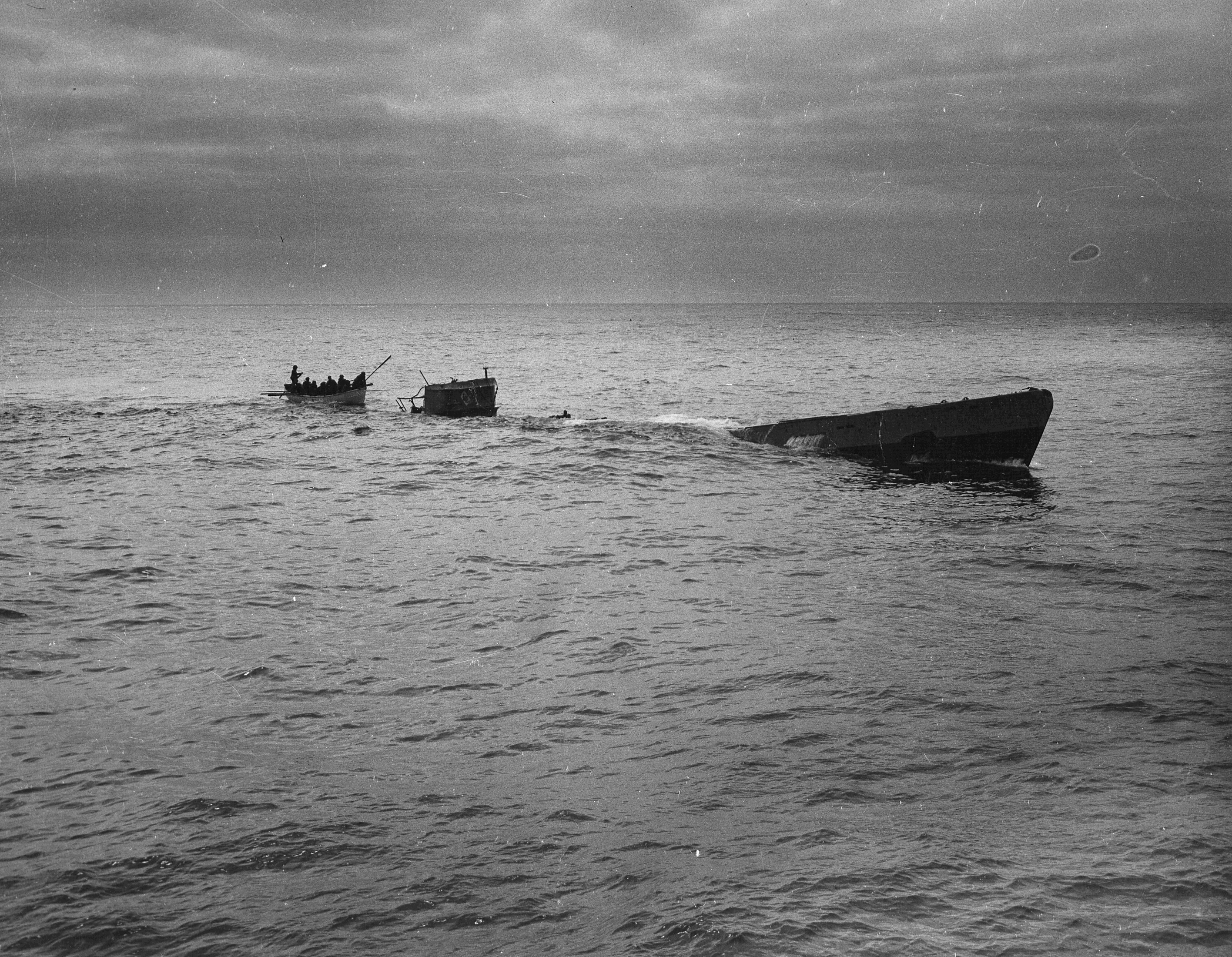
A Coast Guard row boat picking survivors up from U-175

At this point Spencer attacked again and was joined by another Coast Guard cutter, the Duane, they waited for U-175 to surface. On board U-175, quick thinking by the boat's engineer to blow the ballast tanks had prevented them from sinking further and helped right the boat, but communications had been knocked out and it became clear to Bruns that the only option was to surface. Giving the order, the boat rose to the surface; as it did so, Spencer and Duane began firing at close range, while Spencer's commander, Berdine, closed with intent to ram. But Bruns was not intending to fight it out and, seeking to save his crew, led the way onto the conning tower to signal his intention to surrender. The Coast Guard crewmen, however, did not immediately understand the Germans' intentions and maintained a devastating fire on the conning tower that cut down Bruns and a number of other men and forced the others to delay their exit. During the firing, stray rounds from one of the merchant ships hit Spencer, killing one and wounding seven others.

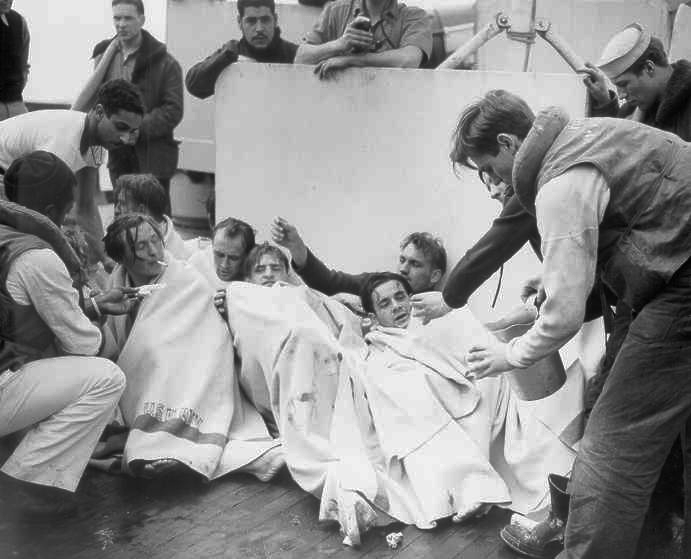
Survivors, 17 April 1943

At this point, Beredine, believing U-175 to still be in the fight, put Spencer about to ram the U-boat but the escort commander, Commander Paul Heineman, ordered him to "heave to" and put a boarding party across instead. As the remaining Germans began to jump into the sea, the Spencer's boarding party attempted to get into the U-boat to search for documents and survivors. The boat quickly began to go under, though, and as a result they were forced to make a hasty departure without having found anything. Of the 54 men that had embarked in U-175, 13 were killed, 19 were rescued by Spencer and 22 were picked up by Duane, where they were formally taken prisoner, treated for their wounds and provided with dry clothing and warm food. Meanwhile, the battle for the convoy continued. A number of other boats, including U-382, U-226 and U-264 were badly damaged in the ensuing engagement and the Allies later reinforced the escort around convoy HX 233 and increased the air assets assigned to it. In response, on 18 April, BdU canceled operations against the convoy, which subsequently arrived in Liverpool on 21 April, having lost only one of its 57 ships.

U-175's final resting place is recorded as south-west of Ireland, at position 47°53′N 22°04′W.

=== Wolfpacks ===
U-175 took part in one wolfpack, namely:

- Aufnahme (15 – 17 April 1943)

== Summary of raiding history ==
U-175 conducted three patrols and sank 10 merchant ships for a total of 40,619 gross register tons (GRT):

Date	Name of Ship	Nationality	Tonnage (GRT)	Fate
18 September 1942	Norfolk	Canada	1,901	Sunk
21 September 1942	Predsednik Kopajtic	Yugoslavia	1,798	Sunk
24 September 1942	West Chetac	United States	5,627	Sunk
26 September 1942	Tambour	Panama	1,827	Sunk
28 September 1942	Alcoa Mariner	United States	5,590	Sunk
1 October 1942	Empire Tennyson	United Kingdom	2,880	Sunk
2 October 1942	Aneroid	Panama	5,074	Sunk
4 October 1942	Caribstar	United States	2,592	Sunk
5 October 1942	William A. McKenney	United States	6,153	Sunk
23 January 1943	Benjamin Smith	United States	7,177	Sunk

== Bibliography ==
- Blair, Clay (2000a) [1996]. Hitler's U-boat War: The Hunters, 1939–1942. New York: Modern Library. ISBN 0-679-64032-0.
- Blair, Clay (2000b) [1996]. Hitler's U-boat War: The Hunted, 1942–1945. New York: Modern Library. ISBN 0-679-64033-9.
- Gröner, Erich; Jung, Dieter; Maass, Martin (1991). U-boats and Mine Warfare Vessels. German Warships 1815–1945. Vol. 2. Translated by Thomas, Keith; Magowan, Rachel. London: Conway Maritime Press. ISBN 0-85177-593-4.
- Hague, Arnold (2000). The Allied Convoy System 1939–1945: Its Organization, Defence and Operation. Annapolis, Maryland: Naval Institute Press. ISBN 1-55750-019-3.
- Haskell, Winthrop (1998). Shadows on the Horizon: The Battle of Convoy HX-233. Annapolis, Maryland: Naval Institute Press. ISBN 1-55750-887-9.
- Kemp, Paul (1999). U-Boats Destroyed: German Submarine Losses in the World Wars. London: Arms & Armour. ISBN 1-85409-515-3.
- Overy, Richard; Wheatcroft, Andrew (1989). The Road To War. London: Macmillan Press. ISBN 978-0-333-44182-4.
