= German submarine U-216 =

German World War II submarine

History

Nazi Germany
- Name: U-216
- Ordered: 16 February 1940
- Builder: Germaniawerft, Kiel
- Yard number: 648
- Laid down: 1 January 1941
- Launched: 23 October 1941
- Commissioned: 15 December 1941
- Fate: Sunk, 20 October 1942

General characteristics
- Class & type: Type VIID submarine
- Displacement: 965 tonnes (950 long tons) surfaced; 1,080 t (1,060 long tons) submerged
- Length: 76.90 m (252 ft 4 in) o/a; 59.80 m (196 ft 2 in) pressure hull
- Beam: 6.38 m (20 ft 11 in) o/a; 4.70 m (15 ft 5 in) pressure hull
- Height: 9.70 m (31 ft 10 in)
- Draught: 5.01 m (16 ft 5 in)
- Installed power: 2,800–3,200 PS (2,100–2,400 kW; 2,800–3,200 bhp) (diesels); 750 PS (550 kW; 740 shp) (electric)
- Propulsion: 2 shafts; 2 × diesel engines; 2 × electric motors
- Speed: 16–16.7 knots (29.6–30.9 km/h; 18.4–19.2 mph) surfaced; 7.9 knots (14.6 km/h; 9.1 mph) submerged
- Range: 11,200 nmi (20,700 km; 12,900 mi) at 10 knots (19 km/h; 12 mph) surfaced; 69 nmi (128 km; 79 mi) at 4 knots (7.4 km/h; 4.6 mph) submerged
- Test depth: 200 m (660 ft); Crush depth: 220–240 m (720–790 ft)
- Crew: 4 officers, 40 enlisted
- Armament: 5 × 53.3 cm (21 in) torpedo tubes (four bow, one stern); 12 × torpedoes or 26 × TMA or 39 × TMB tube-launched mines; 5 × vertical launchers with 15 SMA mines; 1 × 8.8 cm (3.46 in) deck gun (220 rounds); 1 × 20 mm AA (4,380 rounds)

Service record
- Part of: 5th U-boat Flotilla; 15 December 1941 – 31 August 1942; 9th U-boat Flotilla; 1 September – 20 October 1942
- Identification codes: M 47 679
- Commanders: Oblt.z.S. Karl-Otto Schultz; 15 December 1941 – 20 October 1942
- Operations: 1 patrol: 29 August – 20 October 1942
- Victories: 1 merchant ship sunk (4,989 GRT)

German submarine U-216 was a Type VIID mine-laying U-boat of Nazi Germany's Kriegsmarine during World War II. Her keel was laid down 1 January 1941 by Germaniawerft in Kiel as yard number 648. She was launched on 23 October 1941 and commissioned on 15 December 1941 with Oberleutnant zur See Karl-Otto Schultz in command.

== Design ==
As one of the six German Type VIID submarines, U-216 had a displacement of 965 tonnes (950 long tons) when at the surface and 1,080 tonnes (1,060 long tons) while submerged. She had a total length of 76.90 m (252 ft 4 in), a pressure hull length of 59.80 m (196 ft 2 in), a beam of 6.38 m (20 ft 11 in), a height of 9.70 m (31 ft 10 in), and a draught of 5.01 m (16 ft 5 in). The submarine was powered by two Germaniawerft F46 supercharged four-stroke, six-cylinder diesel engines producing a total of 2,800 to 3,200 metric horsepower (2,060 to 2,350 kW; 2,760 to 3,160 shp) for use while surfaced, two AEG GU 460/8-276 double-acting electric motors producing a total of 750 shaft horsepower (760 PS; 560 kW) for use while submerged. She had two shafts and two 1.23 m (4 ft) propellers. The boat was capable of operating at depths of up to 230 metres (750 ft).

The submarine had a maximum surface speed of 16–16.7 knots (29.6–30.9 km/h; 18.4–19.2 mph) and a maximum submerged speed of 7.3 knots (13.5 km/h; 8.4 mph). When submerged, the boat could operate for 69 nautical miles (128 km; 79 mi) at 4 knots (7.4 km/h; 4.6 mph); when surfaced, she could travel 11,200 nautical miles (20,700 km; 12,900 mi) at 10 knots (19 km/h; 12 mph). U-216 was fitted with five 53.3 cm (21 in) torpedo tubes (four fitted at the bow and one at the stern), twelve torpedoes, one 8.8 cm (3.46 in) SK C/35 naval gun, 220 rounds, and an anti-aircraft gun, in addition to five mine tubes with fifteen SMA mines. The boat had a complement of between forty-four.

== Service history ==
U-216 conducted only one patrol, sailing from Kiel on 29 August 1942. On 25 September, U-216 fired four torpedoes at the British Coast Lines Limited ship, Boston. After three hits, the survivors from the ship were picked up by HMS Veteran which was sunk the next day by U-404. On 20 October 1942, the U-boat was depth charged by a British Liberator aircraft and sunk south-west of Ireland in position 48°21′N 19°25′W with all hands lost.

=== Wolfpacks ===
U-216 took part in six wolfpacks, namely:

- Lohs (13 – 15 September 1942)
- Pfeil (15 – 22 September 1942)
- Blitz (22 – 26 September 1942)
- Luchs (27 – 29 September 1942)
- Letzte Ritter (29 September - 1 October 1942)
- Wotan (5 – 17 October 1942)

== Summary of raiding history ==
Date	Ship Name	Nationality	Tonnage (GRT)	Fate
25 September 1942	Boston	United Kingdom	4,989	Sunk

== Bibliography ==
- Busch, Rainer; Röll, Hans-Joachim (1999). German U-boat commanders of World War II : a biographical dictionary. Translated by Brooks, Geoffrey. London, Annapolis, Md: Greenhill Books, Naval Institute Press. ISBN 1-55750-186-6.
- Edwards (1996). Dönitz and the Wolf Packs – The U-boats at War. Cassell Military Classics. p. 112. ISBN 0-304-35203-9.
- Gröner, Erich; Jung, Dieter; Maass, Martin (1991). U-boats and Mine Warfare Vessels. German Warships 1815–1945. Vol. 2. Translated by Thomas, Keith; Magowan, Rachel. London: Conway Maritime Press. ISBN 0-85177-593-4.
- Kemp, Paul (1999). U-Boats Destroyed – German Submarine Losses in the World Wars. London: Arms & Armour. ISBN 1-85409-515-3.
