= German submarine U-514 =

German World War II submarine

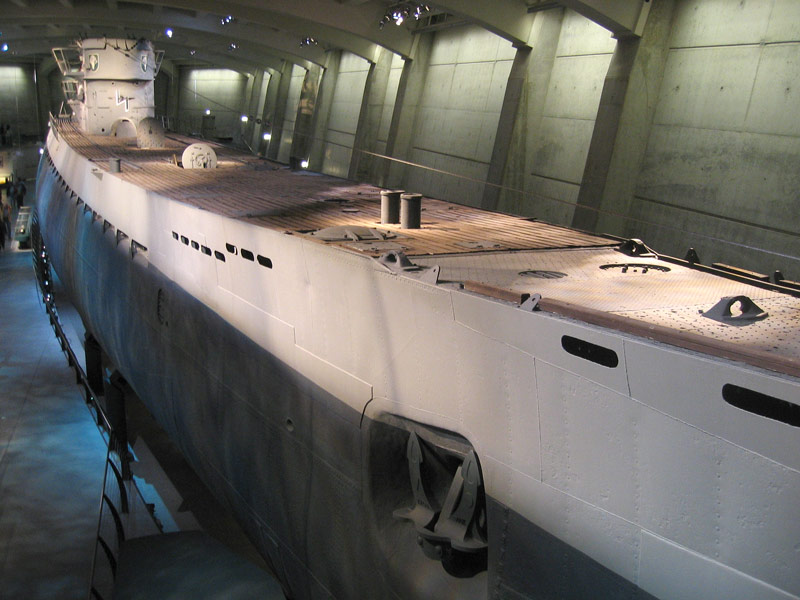
- U-505, a typical Type IXC boat

History

Nazi Germany
- Name: U-514
- Ordered: 14 February 1940
- Builder: Deutsche Werft, Hamburg
- Yard number: 310
- Laid down: 29 April 1941
- Launched: 18 November 1941
- Commissioned: 24 January 1942
- Fate: Sunk on 8 July 1943

General characteristics
- Class & type: Type IXC submarine
- Displacement: 1,120 t (1,100 long tons) surfaced; 1,232 t (1,213 long tons) submerged
- Length: 76.76 m (251 ft 10 in) o/a; 58.75 m (192 ft 9 in) pressure hull
- Beam: 6.76 m (22 ft 2 in) o/a; 4.40 m (14 ft 5 in) pressure hull
- Height: 9.60 m (31 ft 6 in)
- Draught: 4.70 m (15 ft 5 in)
- Installed power: 4,400 PS (3,200 kW; 4,300 bhp) (diesels); 1,000 PS (740 kW; 990 shp) (electric)
- Propulsion: 2 shafts; 2 × diesel engines; 2 × electric motors
- Speed: 18.3 knots (33.9 km/h; 21.1 mph) surfaced; 7.3 knots (13.5 km/h; 8.4 mph) submerged
- Range: 13,450 nmi (24,910 km; 15,480 mi) at 10 knots (19 km/h; 12 mph) surfaced; 63 nmi (117 km; 72 mi) at 4 knots (7.4 km/h; 4.6 mph) submerged
- Test depth: 230 m (750 ft)
- Complement: 4 officer, 44 enlisted
- Armament: 6 × torpedo tubes (4 bow, 2 stern); 22 × 53.3 cm (21 in) torpedoes; 1 × 10.5 cm (4.1 in) SK C/32 deck gun (180 rounds); 1 × 3.7 cm (1.5 in) SK C/30 AA gun; 1 × twin 2 cm FlaK 30 AA guns

Service record
- Part of: 4th U-boat Flotilla; 24 January – 31 August 1942; 10th U-boat Flotilla; 1 September 1942 – 8 July 1943
- Identification codes: M 27 254
- Commanders: Kptlt. Hans-Jürgen Auffermann; 24 January 1942 – 8 July 1943
- Operations: 4 patrols: 1st patrol: 15 August – 9 November 1942; 2nd patrol: 9 December 1942 – 12 February 1943; 3rd patrol: 15 April – 22 May 1943; 4th patrol: 1 – 8 July 1943
- Victories: 4 merchant ships sunk (16,329 GRT); 2 merchant ships total loss (8,202 GRT); 2 merchant ships damaged (13,551 GRT)

German submarine U-514 was a Type IXC U-boat of Nazi Germany's Kriegsmarine during World War II. She was laid down by Hamburg Werft as yard number 310 on 29 April 1941, launched on 18 November and commissioned on 24 January 1942 under Kapitänleutnant Hans-Jürgen Auffermann.

The U-boat was assigned to the 4th U-boat Flotilla for training between 24 January and 31 August 1942 and then the 10th flotilla for operations from 1 September until her loss.

== Design ==
German Type IXC submarines were slightly larger than the original Type IXBs. U-514 had a displacement of 1,120 tonnes (1,100 long tons) when at the surface and 1,232 tonnes (1,213 long tons) while submerged. The U-boat had a total length of 76.76 m (251 ft 10 in), a pressure hull length of 58.75 m (192 ft 9 in), a beam of 6.76 m (22 ft 2 in), a height of 9.60 m (31 ft 6 in), and a draught of 4.70 m (15 ft 5 in). The submarine was powered by two MAN M 9 V 40/46 supercharged four-stroke, nine-cylinder diesel engines producing a total of 4,400 metric horsepower (3,240 kW; 4,340 shp) for use while surfaced, two Siemens-Schuckert 2 GU 345/34 double-acting electric motors producing a total of 1,000 shaft horsepower (1,010 PS; 750 kW) for use while submerged. She had two shafts and two 1.92 m (6 ft) propellers. The boat was capable of operating at depths of up to 230 metres (750 ft).

The submarine had a maximum surface speed of 18.3 knots (33.9 km/h; 21.1 mph) and a maximum submerged speed of 7.3 knots (13.5 km/h; 8.4 mph). When submerged, the boat could operate for 63 nautical miles (117 km; 72 mi) at 4 knots (7.4 km/h; 4.6 mph); when surfaced, she could travel 13,450 nautical miles (24,910 km; 15,480 mi) at 10 knots (19 km/h; 12 mph). U-514 was fitted with six 53.3 cm (21 in) torpedo tubes (four fitted at the bow and two at the stern), 22 torpedoes, one 10.5 cm (4.13 in) SK C/32 naval gun, 180 rounds, and a 3.7 cm (1.5 in) SK C/30 as well as a 2 cm (0.79 in) C/30 anti-aircraft gun. The boat had a complement of forty-eight.

== Service history ==
=== First patrol ===
U-514's operational career began with a short journey from Kiel in Germany to Kristiansand in Norway over 12 and 13 August 1942. She then almost immediately headed west into the Atlantic via the gap between Iceland and the Faeroe Islands. Her first victim was the British sailing schooner Helen Forsey in mid-ocean. Following this success, she moved toward the northern coast of South America, where she attacked five ships. One of them was the Canadian merchant vessel Cornwallis on 11 September 1942 off Barbados, firing six torpedoes into Carlisle Bay. These either missed or impacted on the harbour's anti-torpedo netting. After returning fire with her four-inch gun, Cornwallis sustained a strike from one torpedo that had passed through one of at least four damaged portions of the netting around 4:30 PM. The ship was beached, lest she sink in the harbor, repaired and subsequently returned to service. The boat returned to occupied France, docking in Lorient on 9 November after sinking 9,152 GRT of shipping in 87 days at sea.

=== Second patrol ===
Her second foray between 9 December 1942 and 12 February 1943, although at 66 days not as long as her first, still accounted for 7,177 GRT of shipping.

=== Third patrol ===
On her third patrol, the outbound boat was attacked twice in the same day, 17 April 1943. The first was by a Wellington of 172 Squadron RAF; the second was by a Whitley of 10 Squadron. Both attacks were unsuccessful, as was U-514's patrol.

=== Fourth patrol ===
The German submarine departed Lorient on 1 July 1943 but was sunk on the eighth northwest of Cape Finisterre, Spain by rockets fitted to a British B-24 Liberator of 224 Squadron in the Bay of Biscay among a group of Spanish fishing boats on 8 July, with the loss of all 54 crew. This modification, although effective in this case, was not adopted for use by such an aircraft as the Liberator.

=== Wolfpacks ===
U-514 took part in six wolfpacks, namely:

- Delphin (5 January – 9 February 1943)
- Amsel (22 April – 3 May 1943)
- Specht (27 April – 4 May 1943)
- Fink (4 – 6 May 1943)
- Elbe (7 – 10 May 1943)
- Elbe 1 (10 – 14 May 1943)

== Summary of raiding history ==
Date	Ship Name	Nationality	Tonnage (GRT)	Fate
6 September 1942	Helen Farsey	United Kingdom	167	Sunk
11 September 1942	Cornwallis	Canada	5,458	Damaged
15 September 1942	Kioto	United Kingdom	3,297	Sunk
28 September 1942	Lages	Brazil	5,472	Total loss
28 September 1942	Osorio	Brazil	2,730	Total loss
12 October 1942	Steel Scientist	United States	5,688	Sunk
3 January 1943	British Vigilance	United Kingdom	8,093	Damaged
27 January 1943	Charles C. Pinckney	United States	7,177	Sunk

== Bibliography ==
- Busch, Rainer; Röll, Hans-Joachim (1999). German U-boat commanders of World War II : a biographical dictionary. Translated by Brooks, Geoffrey. London, Annapolis, Md: Greenhill Books, Naval Institute Press. ISBN 1-55750-186-6.
- Busch, Rainer; Röll, Hans-Joachim (1999). Deutsche U-Boot-Verluste von September 1939 bis Mai 1945 [German U-boat losses from September 1939 to May 1945]. Der U-Boot-Krieg (in German). Vol. IV. Hamburg, Berlin, Bonn: Mittler. ISBN 3-8132-0514-2.
- Gröner, Erich; Jung, Dieter; Maass, Martin (1991). U-boats and Mine Warfare Vessels. German Warships 1815–1945. Vol. 2. Translated by Thomas, Keith; Magowan, Rachel. London: Conway Maritime Press. ISBN 0-85177-593-4.
- Kemp, Paul (1999). U-Boats Destroyed - German Submarine Losses in the World Wars. London: Arms & Armour. ISBN 1-85409-515-3.
