= German submarine U-617 =

German World War II submarine

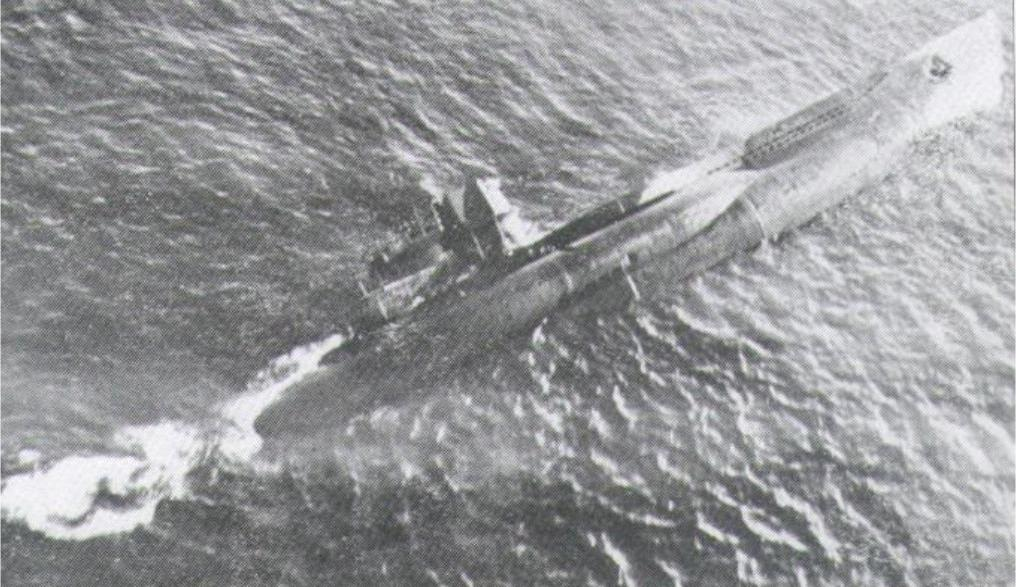
- U-617 aground near Mellila, Morocco after British air attack on 12 September 1943.

History

Nazi Germany
- Name: U-617
- Ordered: 15 August 1940
- Builder: Blohm & Voss, Hamburg
- Yard number: 593
- Laid down: 31 May 1941
- Launched: 14 February 1942
- Commissioned: 9 April 1942
- Fate: Ran aground and destroyed on 12 September 1943

General characteristics
- Class & type: Type VIIC submarine
- Displacement: 769 tonnes (757 long tons) surfaced; 871 t (857 long tons) submerged
- Length: 67.10 m (220 ft 2 in) o/a; 50.50 m (165 ft 8 in) pressure hull
- Beam: 6.20 m (20 ft 4 in) o/a; 4.70 m (15 ft 5 in) pressure hull
- Height: 9.60 m (31 ft 6 in)
- Draught: 4.74 m (15 ft 7 in)
- Installed power: 2,800–3,200 PS (2,100–2,400 kW; 2,800–3,200 bhp) (diesels); 750 PS (550 kW; 740 shp) (electric)
- Propulsion: 2 shafts; 2 × diesel engines; 2 × electric motors
- Speed: 17.7 knots (32.8 km/h; 20.4 mph) surfaced; 7.6 knots (14.1 km/h; 8.7 mph) submerged
- Range: 8,500 nmi (15,700 km; 9,800 mi) at 10 knots (19 km/h; 12 mph) surfaced; 80 nmi (150 km; 92 mi) at 4 knots (7.4 km/h; 4.6 mph) submerged
- Test depth: 230 m (750 ft); Crush depth: 250–295 m (820–968 ft)
- Complement: 4 officers, 40–56 enlisted
- Armament: 5 × 53.3 cm (21 in) torpedo tubes (four bow, one stern); 14 × torpedoes or 26 TMA mines; 1 × 8.8 cm (3.46 in) deck gun (220 rounds); 1 x 2 cm (0.79 in) C/30 AA gun

Service record
- Part of: 5th U-boat Flotilla; 9 April – 31 August 1942; 7th U-boat Flotilla; 1 September – 30 November 1942; 29th U-boat Flotilla; 1 December 1942 – 12 September 1943
- Identification codes: M 46 554
- Commanders: Kptlt. Albrecht Brandi; 9 April 1942 – 12 September 1943
- Operations: 7 patrols: 1st patrol: 29 August – 7 October 1942; 2nd patrol: 2 – 28 November 1942; 3rd patrol: 21 December 1942 – 17 January 1943; 4th patrol: 27 January – 13 February 1943; 5th patrol: 25 March – 17 April 1943; 6th patrol: a. 31 May – 1 June 1943; b. 19 June – 20 July 1943; 7th patrol: 28 August – 12 September 1943
- Victories: 8 merchant ships sunk (25,879 GRT); 2 warships sunk (3,700 tons); 1 auxiliary warship sunk (810 GRT)

German submarine U-617 was a Type VIIC U-boat built for Nazi Germany's Kriegsmarine for service during World War II. She was laid down on 31 May 1941 by Blohm & Voss in Hamburg as yard number 593, launched on 14 February 1942 and commissioned on 9 April under Kapitänleutnant Albrecht Brandi.

The boat's service began on 9 April 1942 with training as part of the 5th U-boat Flotilla. She was transferred to the 7th flotilla on 1 September 1942 and moved on to the 29th flotilla on 1 December 1942.

== Design ==
German Type VIIC submarines were preceded by the shorter Type VIIB submarines. U-617 had a displacement of 769 tonnes (757 long tons) when at the surface and 871 tonnes (857 long tons) while submerged. She had a total length of 67.10 m (220 ft 2 in), a pressure hull length of 50.50 m (165 ft 8 in), a beam of 6.20 m (20 ft 4 in), a height of 9.60 m (31 ft 6 in), and a draught of 4.74 m (15 ft 7 in). The submarine was powered by two Germaniawerft F46 four-stroke, six-cylinder supercharged diesel engines producing a total of 2,800 to 3,200 metric horsepower (2,060 to 2,350 kW; 2,760 to 3,160 shp) for use while surfaced, two Brown, Boveri & Cie GG UB 720/8 double-acting electric motors producing a total of 750 metric horsepower (550 kW; 740 shp) for use while submerged. She had two shafts and two 1.23 m (4 ft) propellers. The boat was capable of operating at depths of up to 230 metres (750 ft).

The submarine had a maximum surface speed of 17.7 knots (32.8 km/h; 20.4 mph) and a maximum submerged speed of 7.6 knots (14.1 km/h; 8.7 mph). When submerged, the boat could operate for 80 nautical miles (150 km; 92 mi) at 4 knots (7.4 km/h; 4.6 mph); when surfaced, she could travel 8,500 nautical miles (15,700 km; 9,800 mi) at 10 knots (19 km/h; 12 mph). U-617 was fitted with five 53.3 cm (21 in) torpedo tubes (four fitted at the bow and one at the stern), fourteen torpedoes, one 8.8 cm (3.46 in) SK C/35 naval gun, 220 rounds, and a 2 cm (0.79 in) C/30 anti-aircraft gun. The boat had a complement of between forty-four and sixty.

== Service history ==
In seven patrols she sank eight ships for a total of 25,879 gross register tons (GRT), plus two warships and one auxiliary warship.

=== Wolfpacks ===
In addition she took part in five wolfpacks, namely:

- Pfeil (12 – 22 September 1942)
- Blitz (22 – 26 September 1942)
- Tiger (26 – 30 September 1942)
- Delphin (4 – 10 November 1942)
- Wal (10 – 15 November 1942)

=== Fate ===
She ran aground on 12 September 1943 at position 35°38′N 03°27′W near Melilla after a sustained air attack by Leigh light-equipped RAF Wellington bombers from 179 Squadron.

All crew members were able to evacuate the stricken sub and subsequently interned by the Spanish authorities. They were later repatriated to Germany.

The abandoned submarine was then finished off with combined RAF Hudson and FAA Swordfish aircraft from Gibraltar and gunfire from HMS Hyacinth and HMAS Wollongong.

== Summary of raiding history ==
Date	Ship Name	Nationality	Tonnage (Note: Merchant ship tonnages are in gross register tons. Military vessels are listed by tons displacement.)	Fate
7 September 1942	Tor II	Faeroes	292	Sunk
23 September 1942	Athelsultan	United Kingdom	8,882	Sunk
23 September 1942	Tennessee	United Kingdom	2,342	Sunk
24 September 1942	Roumanie	Belgium	3,563	Sunk
28 December 1942	HMS St Issey	Royal Navy	810	Sunk
15 January 1943	Annitsa	Greece	4,324	Sunk
15 January 1943	Harboe Jensen	Norway	1,862	Sunk
1 February 1943	HMS Welshman	Royal Navy	2,650	Sunk
5 February 1943	Corona	Norway	3,264	Sunk
5 February 1943	Henrik	Norway	1,350	Sunk
6 September 1943	HMS Puckeridge	Royal Navy	1,050	Sunk

== Bibliography ==
- Busch, Rainer; Röll, Hans-Joachim (1999). German U-boat commanders of World War II : a biographical dictionary. Translated by Brooks, Geoffrey. London, Annapolis, Md: Greenhill Books, Naval Institute Press. ISBN 1-55750-186-6.
- Busch, Rainer; Röll, Hans-Joachim (1999). Der U-Boot-Krieg, 1939-1945: Deutsche U-Boot-Verluste von September 1939 bis Mai 1945 [German U-boat losses from September 1939 to May 1945] (in German). Vol. IV. Hamburg, Berlin, Bonn: Mittler. ISBN 3-8132-0514-2.
- Busch, Rainer; Röll, Hans-Joachim (2001). Der U-Boot-Krieg, 1939-1945: Deutsche U-Boot-Verluste von September 1939 bis Mai 1945 [German U-boat successes from September 1939 to May 1945] (in German). Vol. III. Hamburg: Mittler & Sohn. ISBN 3813205134.
- Gröner, Eric; Jung, Dieter; Maass, Martin (1991). German Warships 1815-1945: U-boats and Mine Warfare Vessels. Vol. 2. Translated by Thomas, Keith; Magowan, Rachel. London: Conway Maritime Press. ISBN 0-85177-593-4.
