= Sledge Island =

Alaskan island in the Bering Sea

Coordinates: 64°29′9.02″N 166°12′35.12″W

Location in Alaska

Sledge Island, or Ayak Island, (Inupiaq: Ayaaq; Yup'ik: Asaaq) is a small volcanic island in the Bering Sea. It is located 5.3 mi (8.5 km) from the southwestern shore of the Seward Peninsula, off the shores of Alaska.

== Geography ==
Sledge Island is of volcanic origin and is only 1.6 miles (2.6 km) across. The average elevation is 410 feet (120 meters). Administratively this island belongs to the Nome Census Area, Alaska.

The island is 2.80 km (1.74 mi) long and 1.48 km (0.92 mi) wide.

The island is part of the Bering Sea unit of the Alaska Maritime National Wildlife Refuge.

== History ==
This island was named on August 5, 1778, by Captain James Cook, who commented: "We found, a little way from the shore where we landed, a sledge, which occasioned this name being given to the island." Martin Sauer, the secretary of the 1791 Russian expedition who sailed under orders from Catherine II of Russia, claimed in 1802 that the Inuit name of this island was "Ayak."

Captain Frederick Beechey observed: "It is singular that this island, which was named Sledge Island by Captain Cook, from the circumstances of one of these implements being found upon it, should be called by a word signifying the same thing in Esquimaux language."

The island was featured in seasons 8 and 11 of Bering Sea Gold, as a site to prospect and mine for seafloor placer gold.

== Demographics ==
Historical population
Census	Pop.	Note	%±
1880	50		—
1890	67		34.0%
U.S. Decennial Census

Sledge Island first appeared in the U.S. Census in 1880 as the unincorporated Inuit village of Aziak. All 50 of its residents were Inuit. It returned again in 1890 as Sledge Island, with 67 residents (all native). However, this included the residents of the island (listed as the village of "Ahyak") and three adjacent small villages on the mainland, including Okinoyoktokawik, Senikave & Sunvalluk. These were located approximately 19–20 miles west of present-day Nome, near a feature called West Point. It has not reported in any census since.
