= Convoy SQ 36 =

Convoy of merchant ships

- Part of World War II, Battle of the Atlantic, Battle of the St. Lawrence
| Date | 12–16 September 1942 |
| Location | St. Lawrence River |
| Result | German tactical victory |

Belligerents
| Germany | Canada; United Kingdom (Kingdom of Greece) Greece; Norway; United States; Netherlands |

Commanders and leaders
| Karl Dönitz; Eberhard Hoffmann; Paul Hartwig | |

Strength
| 2 U-boats | 22 merchant ships 7 escorts |

Casualties and losses
| | 3 ships sunk 2 ships damaged |

Convoy SQ 36 was a trade convoy of merchant ships during the Second World War. It was one of the numbered SQ convoys from Sydney, Nova Scotia to Québec. The convoy was found on 15 September 1942 by U-517, which then destroyed two ships from the convoy while U-165 sank another and damaged two.

== Background ==
The SQ convoys were a series of merchant ship formations escorted by warships ranging in size from destroyers to motor launches to protect against attack by German submarines in the St. Lawrence River and the Gulf of St. Lawrence. The convoys travelled from Sydney, Nova Scotia, to Quebec City, Quebec, and were the reverse direction of river traffic of the QS convoys. The March 1942 St. Lawrence Conference reviewed plans for Quebec–Sydney convoys for defence against U-boats in the Gulf of St. Lawrence and the St. Lawrence River as well as establishing a base at Gaspé, Quebec for the St. Lawrence patrol force, named Gaspé Force. However, by Spring 1942 the only deterrent active within the St. Lawrence were air patrols. In early May, the first U-boat arrived in the St. Lawrence, U-553. It entered the Gulf of St. Lawrence and sank two merchant vessels.

Following the attacks, all independent sailings were cancelled and the QS-SQ convoy system was adopted. As a result of merchant ship losses in the Atlantic Ocean, many slow lake freighters, vessels built for shipping on the Great Lakes, had been brought into service supplying St. Lawrence ports. The large number of slow ships prevented the adoption of slow and fast convoys of merchants, making all the convoys uniform in speed with a maximum of 14 knots (26 km/h; 16 mph).

From 6 to 10 September 1942, U-517 and U-165 successfully attacked Convoy QS-33 and caused severe losses to the merchants travelling within it. On 11 September, U-517 sank the corvette HMCS Charlottetown in the St. Lawrence River. Following the failure of QS-33, which despite air cover and warship escort, the Naval Service Headquarters in Ottawa transferred two destroyers from the Western Local Escort Force to augment the convoy escort of future sailings.

== Ships in the convoy ==
=== Merchant ships ===
SQ 33 was one of the larger convoys in the series. There were twenty-two merchant vessels in the convoy. Thirteen were travelling in ballast, six were loaded with coal and three with paper. The vessels were arranged in seven columns, with the middle row containing four vessels. Each ship was to be spaced five cables apart (roughly 971 m, 3,186 ft) and 366 m (1,201 ft) from the one ahead of it. The Convoy Commodore was situated aboard Llangollen and the Convoy Vice Commodore aboard Essex Lance. The convoy commodore was responsible for station keeping among the merchants and to relay any orders to the rest of the merchant fleet from the senior escort officer.

Merchant vessels
| Name | Flag | Tonnage (GRT) | Notes |
|---|---|---|---|
| Agios Georgios (1911) | Greece | 4,248 | |
| Anna (1897) | Finland | 1,043 | |
| Askot (1938) | Norway | 1,323 | |
| Cragpool (1928) | United Kingdom | 5,133 | |
| Essex Lance (1918) | United Kingdom | 6,625 | Damaged by U-165 |
| Inger Elizabeth (1920) | Norway | 2,166 | Sunk by U-517 |
| Janeta (1929) | United Kingdom | 4,312 | |
| Joannis (1909) | Greece | 3,667 | Sunk by U-165 |
| Katiingo Hadjipatera (1913) | Greece | 3.661 | |
| Llangollen (1928) | United Kingdom | 5,056 | |
| North Brook (1919) | United Kingdom | 2,373 | |
| Pan York (1901) | United States | 4,750 | Damaged by U-165 |
| Peterston (1925) | United Kingdom | 4,680 | |
| Picotee (1913) | United Kingdom | 4,307 | |
| Rolf Jarl (1920) | Norway | 1,917 | |
| Royalite (1916) | United Kingdom | 2,052 | |
| Saturnus (1909) | Netherlands | 4,307 | Sunk by U-517 |
| Solhavn (1918) | Norway | 1,630 | |
| Trenora | | | |
| Winha (1904) | United Kingdom | 3,391 | |
| Yildum (1913) | United Kingdom | 3,731 | |

=== Escort ===
The escort initially comprised five vessels, led by the Flower-class corvette HMCS Arrowhead, also containing the Bangor-class minesweeper HMCS Vegreville and three Fairmile B motor launches. The destroyer HMS Salisbury, commanded by Lieutenant M. H. R. Crichton, joined the escort late on the first day. Salisbury was one of the destroyers temporarily assigned to Gaspé Force. The destroyer was equipped with Type 271 radar which made the vessel capable of locating surfaced submarines. The Fairmiles Q-082 and Q-063 remained with the convoy.

The convoy was provided with air cover from detachments based at Mont-Joli and Gaspé, Quebec, Charlottetown and Summerside, Prince Edward Island and Chatham, New Brunswick. A Canso amphibious aircraft accompanied the convoy as close air cover from sunrise to nightfall. On 15 September, the convoy escort was reinforced by the corvette HMCS Summerside and the minesweeper HMCS Chedabucto.

Escort vessels
| Name | Flag | Type | Notes |
|---|---|---|---|
| HMCS Chedabucto | Royal Canadian Navy | Bangor-class minesweeper | Escort 15–16 September |
| HMCS Arrowhead | Royal Canadian Navy | Flower-class corvette | Escort 13–16 September |
| HMS Salisbury | Royal Navy | Town-class destroyer | Escort 13–16 September |
| HMCS Summerside | Royal Canadian Navy | Flower-class corvette | Escort 15–16 September |
| Q-082 | Royal Canadian Navy | Fairmile B motor launch | Escort 13–16 September |
| Q-063 | Royal Canadian Navy | Fairmile B motor launch | Escort 13–16 September |

== Battle ==
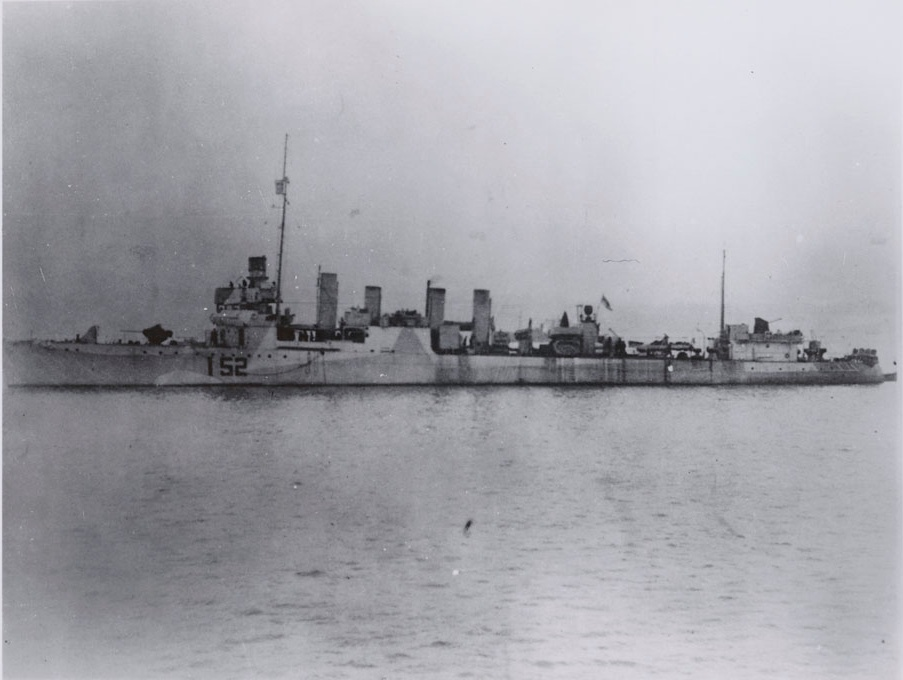
HMS Salisbury c. 1941–42

=== Attack by U-517 ===
SQ 36 was due to sail on 11 September bound for Quebec City. However, due to the attacks on QS-33 and the resulting decision to have destroyers accompany Gulf convoys, SQ-36's sailing was delayed until 13 September in order to allow Salisbury to join the escort. The convoy departed Sydney at 05:30 on 13 September, with Salisbury joined the convoy's screen at 17:45 directly from St. John's, Newfoundland and Labrador where the destroyer had been undergoing repairs. On 15 September, the escorts Summerside and Chedabucto joined the convoy screen off the Baie des Chaleurs. During this period, U-517 had begun to move its patrol area from around the Magdalen Islands to Gaspé. While in transit on 15 September, the submarine spotted a Canso overhead and took it as a sign of nearby convoy. The submarine spotted the convoy at 12:00 and the submarine's commander, Kapitänleutnant Paul Hartwig, used the same tactics that had worked successfully during his attack on QS 33. Hartwig moved the submarine into the predicted path of the convoy and let the convoy sail towards him. However, the convoy made a change of direction and the submarine ended up off the starboard side of the convoy.

The sequence of events that followed were confused. In research by historians Michael L. Hadley and Roger Sarty, the logs of the submarine and the convoy do not match and certain events could not be corroborated. Furthermore, the chemically treated paper used in Salisbury's asdic returns faded so quickly that even in the immediate investigation following the attack by command staff at Halifax, Nova Scotia found it useless.

As U-517 moved to avoid Salisbury, which had been sweeping back towards the rear of the convoy. According to Hartwig's log, he fired four torpedoes at two vessels in separate columns at 13:33. He was forced to dive shortly after firing and claimed only one hit. Unknown to him, two of his torpedoes had struck targets, with the other two exploding in the rocks below Cap-des-Rosiers roughly 6.5 kilometres (4.0 mi) away. The first merchant hit, Inger Elizabeth was the lead vessel in one of the columns and suffered an explosion amidships between hold #2 and the boiler room. The vessel had been transporting coal bound for Port-Alfred, Quebec and sank within five minutes of the torpedoing. Twenty-three of the twenty-six were rescued. The second vessel to be hit was Saturnus, a defensively equipped merchant ship (DEMS), sailing in ballast bound for Montreal. Saturnus was the second ship in its column, dead centre of the convoy. Lookouts aboard Saturnus spotted the torpedo as it closed with the ship and increased speed and made to turn. However, the torpedo struck the vessel's stern. Saturnus sank in fifteen minutes with thirty-five of thirty-six of its crew being rescued. The survivors were landed north of Gaspé and trucked into town and then took a train to Montreal.

According to the convoy record, Llangollen, another DEMS, spotted a periscope between the columns a few minutes after Saturnus was hit. Llangollen opened fire with its guns and at 13:45, the DEMS Cragpool and Janetta also began firing on contacts. A sixteen-minute delay between the first torpedoing and reaction by the convoy escorts elapsed, which Hadley states was the result of the Royal Navy Salisbury being unfamiliar with routines and procedures of Canadian tactics in gulf convoys. Salisbury turned towards sound of gunfire and spotted a periscope, which disappeared at 13:50 as Hartwig dove to 180 metres (590 ft). Salisbury made asdic contact with the submarine and dropped five depth charges at 14:00. Arrowhead, which had been sweeping ahead of the convoy, joined Salisbury at the site of the asdic contact and dropped nine depth charges, with some set to 46 metres (151 ft) and others to 92 metres (302 ft). Arrowhead and Salisbury made two more attacks before Summerside arrived to relieve the destroyer. The corvettes continued to hunt in the area until the Fairmiles arrived to relieve them, with Arrowhead departing to rejoin the convoy at 15:40 and Summerside at 16:20. The depth charges that the escorts had dropped damaged the storage tubes for reserve torpedoes on the exterior of the submarine's hull. Hartwig kept the submarine submerged until nightfall and gave up chasing the convoy as heavy fog set in.

=== Attack by U-165 ===
Following the first attack, the convoy changed its organization with five columns of four merchant vessels. Salisbury was stationed 3.2 kilometres (2 miles) ahead of the centre column, with Vegreville, Summerside and Q-063 on the port side of the column and Chedabucto, Arrowhead and Q-082 on the starboard side. U-165 had been patrolling off Les Méchins, Quebec in the St. Lawrence River, approximately 250 kilometres (160 mi) west of where the convoy came under attack by U-517. On 16 September, the convoy approached U-165's patrol area, where the submarine had been alerted by U-517 of the convoy's arrival. Under the command of Fregattenkapitän Eberhard Hoffman, the submarine moved to attack the convoy while submerged, entering the convoy between positions of Vegreville and Summerside. At 07:09, lookouts aboard Essex Lance, which was in ballast heading for Montreal, spotted a torpedo track in the water 1,300 metres (4,200 ft) off the starboard bow. Essex Lance was the lead ship in the port side column, closest to shore. The torpedo struck the ship at 07:10 between the rudder and the propeller. Essex Lance settled by the stern but did not sink. The crew of fifty took to the lifeboats, but one of the crew drowned.

A few minutes later the merchant Joannis spotted a periscope within the convoy. Joannis was behind Essex Lance in the same column and was sailing in ballast bound for Montreal. (Note: According to Arnold Hague's Convoy Database, Joannis was carrying anthracite.) Just as the vessel began evasive manoeuvres, a torpedo struck the ship aft. Joannis sank quickly, though the entire crew of thirty-seven escaped the ship. The survivors of both torpedoed merchants were loaded aboard Q-082 and landed at Saint-Paulin-Dalibaire (now part of Les Méchins). Salisbury moved to where the periscope had been sighted and at 07:17 got a contact on asdic, but had problems manoeuvering within the convoy. Arrowhead and Summerside which had moved to join Salisbury, could not relocate the contact. Vegreville attempted to tow Essex Lance which had not sunk. The stern of Essex Lance had dropped a further 11.6 metres (38 ft) in the water and the bow of the vessel had begun to cant upward, forcing Vegreville to abandon the tow. The minesweeper abandoned the vessel, which remained loose in the St. Lawrence River until the arrival of the salvage tug Lord Strathcona on 17 September which towed the damaged merchant to Quebec City, arriving on 22 September. Essex Lance was repaired and returned to service. U-165 torpedoed one more vessel of the convoy, Pan York, which survived. Salisbury and Arrowhead made more depth charge attacks at 08:04, neither of which were reported by U-165.

== Aftermath ==
At 11:00 on 16 September, Salisbury departed the convoy's screen to join its next convoy. The rest of the convoy arrived at Quebec on 16 September. U-165 had expended all its torpedoes and began the return voyage home. At 10:00 the submarine was caught on the surface by a Hudson light bomber of No. 113 Squadron RCAF. The bomber went into a steep dive, using its camouflage to approach the submarine without being detected. The Hudson fired 361 machine gun rounds, strafing the submarine, before dropping four depth charges, fused for 7.6 metres (25 ft). The depth charges bracketed the submarine but did no damage. U-165 was later sunk in the Bay of Biscay on its return to base in France. On 21 September, U-517 was nearly rammed and sunk by HMCS Georgian while approaching SQ 38. On 29 September, the submarine was bombed by another aircraft from 113 Squadron, with one unexploded depth charge lodged in the U-517's foredeck. The submarine withdrew from the area on 2 October.

These losses contributed to the Canadian government's decision to close the Gulf and St. Lawrence River to overseas shipping. Additionally, the pressing need for escorts in the upcoming invasion of North Africa by Allied forces prevented Canada from allocating further reinforcements to the gulf convoys. On 9 September, the Canadian government informed their allies that all overseas shipping bound for ports on the St. Lawrence River be diverted to Saint John, New Brunswick, Sydney or Halifax. Furthermore, the government intended to shut down the QS series of convoys within two weeks.

== Bibliography ==
- Greenfield, Nathan M. (2004). The Battle of the St. Lawrence: The Second World War in Canada. Toronto: HarperCollins Publishers Limited. ISBN 0-00-200664-2.
- Hadley, Michael L. (1985). U-Boats Against Canada: German Submarines in Canadian Waters. Montreal, Quebec and Kingston, Ontario: McGill-Queen's University Press. ISBN 0-7735-0811-2.
- Milner, Marc (2010). Canada's Navy: The First Century (Second ed.). Toronto: University of Toronto Press. ISBN 978-0-8020-9604-3.
- Sarty, Roger (2012). War in the St. Lawrence: The Forgotten U-Boat Battles on Canada's Shores. Toronto: Penguin Group. ISBN 978-0-670-06787-9.
- Schull, Joseph (1961). The Far Distant Ships: An Official Account of Canadian Naval Operations in the Second World War. Ottawa: Queen's Printer. OCLC 19974782.
