= SS Sea Hare =

SS Sea Hare may refer to one of two Type C3-S-A2 ships built for the United States Maritime Commission:

- SS Sea Hare (June 1944) (MC hull number 1553), built by Ingalls Shipbuilding; acquired by the United States Navy and converted to Bayfield-class attack transport USS Goshen (APA-108); sold for commercial service in 1947; scrapped in 1973
- SS Sea Hare (December 1944) (MC hull number 884), built by Western Pipe and Steel; delivered in April 1945; sold 1947; scrapped in 1973

These ships were named after the shell-less marine mollusks known as sea hares.
