= Admiral Spencer =

Admiral Spencer may refer to:

- Frederick Spencer, 4th Earl Spencer (1798–1857), British Royal Navy vice admiral
- Lyndon Spencer (1898–1981), U.S. Coast Guard vice admiral
- Peter Spencer (Royal Navy officer) (born 1947), British Royal Navy vice admiral
