= MS American Leader =

Merchant cargo ship sunk in World War II

Coordinates: 45°44′7″S 9°46′1″E

- MS American Leader at sea in 1941

History

- Name: MS American Leader
- Operator: United States Lines
- Port of registry: New York
- Builder: Western Pipe and Steel Company
- Yard number: 58
- Launched: 8 October 1940
- Acquired: 12 June 1941
- Maiden voyage: June 1941
- Out of service: 10 September 1942
- Fate: Sunk by torpedo 10 September 1942

General characteristics
- Class & type: C1-B
- Tonnage: 8,015
- Displacement: 12,875
- Length: 417.75 ft (127 m)
- Beam: 60 ft (18 m)
- Draft: 27 ft (8 m)
- Installed power: 2 Busch-Sulzer 2-cycle, trunk-piston diesel engines
- Propulsion: 4-blade single screw
- Speed: 14 knots (26 km/h; 16 mph)
- Capacity: 8 passengers (4 spares)
- Crew: 43 (2 spares)

MS American Leader was a merchant cargo ship which entered service for the United States Lines in 1941. It was most noted for falling victim to the German auxiliary cruiser Michel during the Second World War. Her surviving crew members were taken as prisoners of war and collectively they endured three ship sinkings.

== Design and construction ==
American Leader was one of five vessels constructed by the Western Pipe and Steel Company from the US Maritime Commission's Type C1-B design. The detailed building plans were prepared for Western Pipe and Steel by New York naval architect George G. Sharp. In the 1930s American shipyards were making a transition from riveting to welding as the main building method and Western had been a pioneer in using these techniques since 1929. Welding reduced weight and steel usage because plate seams did not have to overlap as with riveting. New workers acquired welding skills more quickly than riveting techniques. Welding transformed shipbuilding by allowing assembly in modules which could be placed sideways or even upside down to facilitate construction.

"Here there had been developed a welding technique which enables us to construct standard merchant ships with a speed unequaled in the history of merchant shipping..."
- US President Franklin Roosevelt to UK Prime Minister Winston Churchill

=== Hull Design ===
The C1-B cargo ships were constructed with flush full scantling type decks having a raked stem and cruiser stern. Two complete steel decks, the main and second decks, were fitted and a third deck was fitted below the second deck extending from the stem to the forward machinery space bulkhead. The double bottom extended from the forward collision bulkhead to the after collision bulkhead. Two 28-foot lifeboats, with a capacity of 60 persons each, were stowed under mechanical davits on the bridge deck.

The hull was subdivided by seven transverse bulkheads, all watertight to the main deck. Five cargo holds were provided: three forward and two aft of the machinery space. Cargo was handled through five hatches, one for each hold. Deep tanks were provided for 702 tons of liquid cargo.

=== Vessel Accommodations and Fittings ===
The crew accommodations were all in a midship deck house. Crew quarters, messrooms, galley, hospital and the ship's stores were on the main deck. Officers' quarters, accommodations for eight passengers, a combined dining room/lounge and the pantry are on the cabin deck. The captain's office and stateroom and the chief mate's stateroom were on the bridge deck with the wheel house, chart room, radio room, gyro room, fan room and the emergency generator room. Mechanical ventilation and heating was provided for all living and working spaces.

Masts were fitted on the centerline of the vessel between hatches Nos. 1 and 2, 2 and 3, and 4 and 5, to which cargo booms were rigged. Two king posts, one port and one starboard, were fitted at both the forward and after ends of the deck house. Hatches Nos. 1 and 5 were provided with two 5-ton booms and two winches each. Nos. 2, 3 and 4 hatches were provided with four 5-ton booms and four winches each. The cargo winches were driven by 50-horsepower electric motors, all installed on the main deck.

The vessel was constructed with fire-resistant materials and also had enhanced fire-detecting and fire-extinguishing equipment installed for the time. A "smoke-pipe" fire-detecting system was installed in all cargo spaces, the paint locker, carpenter shop, dry storeroom and bosun's storerooms. A CO_{2} fire suppression system protected the cargo spaces, service spaces and machinery space in addition to standard fire fighting equipment.

=== Propulsion system ===
When ship building expanded in 1940, steam turbine propulsion was the dominant technology. High speed steam turbines, however, required highly precise manufacturing techniques and the companies capable of producing them were already at capacity with commitments for military and high speed merchant ships. Low speed ships that were to travel in convoys such as the Liberty ships were fitted with triple-expansion steam engines. These were already relics of an earlier age but did not require high precision manufacturing as did turbines. The US Navy had been experimenting with diesel engines for surface ships since 1915 when then-Lieutenant Chester W. Nimitz supervised their construction and installation in the USS Maumee. American Leader and her four sister C1-B ships at Western were therefore powered by two Busch-Sulzer two-cycle, trunk-piston diesel engines connected to the shaft through electro-magnetic couplings and reduction gears. The use of twin propulsion units to drive a single shaft in the C1-B ships allowed either engine to be shut down for inspection or maintenance while the ship continued on at reduced speed. Diesels had the advantage of starting almost instantaneously without waiting for steam pressure to build. At the time, however, diesel engines had a low power to space ratio; a disadvantage on a ship that required cargo space. The steering gear was an electro-hydraulic double-ram type, controlled by a telemotor transmission and gyro-pilot system.

== Service career ==
American Leader was delivered to the United States Lines 12 June 1941 and began cargo service between New York and the Far East through the Panama Canal. A third officer for the ship recalled a "usual cargo of canned goods, tobacco, paint, automobiles, etc. in several East Coast ports..."

as the ship was bound for Manila, Hong Kong, and Shanghai. At Wilmington, California her cargo would begin to include items for a nation at war: mail, magazines, but also several large underground fuel tanks destined for the United States Army Air Force in the Philippines. While she was at Manila the Japanese attacked Pearl Harbor. Two days later her crew witnessed the destruction of ships in Manila Bay and of the United States Naval Base at Cavite. The ship continued on to Australia and safely reached Boston on 17 March 1942.

In May an Armed Guard was added to American Leader. The ship's armaments consisted of "...an ancient 4-inch cannon on our stern, plus four machine guns - two of which never fired one round without jamming.."
-American Leader Third Officer George Duffy

American Leader next headed to the Persian Gulf ports with a cargo of war supplies for Soviet troops. She also carried nine twin-engine bombers on her deck.

== Sinking by Hilfskreuzer Michel ==
On 7 September 1942, American Leader was in Cape Town where she received orders from the British Admiralty. She was sent westward - unescorted - toward the Straits of Magellan to the Pacific. At that time the Hilfskreuzer (auxiliary cruiser) Michel of the Deutsche Kriegsmarine (German Navy) had already taken nine ships in the South Atlantic. Despite having the outward appearance of a civilian cargo ship she was heavily armed. Michel also had above and below water torpedo tubes and her targets were identified by two scouting aircraft.

On the evening of 10 September 1942 American Leader became her 10th target. She was approximately 800 miles to the west of the Cape of Good Hope when Michel appeared off her starboard bow and opened fire. Kerosene drums on the deck exploded and Lifeboat #1 was destroyed along with the radio equipment. The shelling next destroyed the davits. Two torpedoes hit American Leader and she sank in 25 minutes.

Eleven crew members died in the sinking while 47 survivors managed to board life rafts. At daybreak Michel returned to take the surviving crew members prisoner. While on board Michel the survivors met prisoners taken from an earlier raid. The following day the British ship Empire Dawn was taken.

== Fate of the Crew ==
On 7 October 1942 the 72 American and British seamen on board Michel were transferred to a Kriegsmarine resupply ship Uckermark and were handed over to the Japanese at Tandjong Priok in early November 1942. They first went to the Cycle Camp, and later some were sent to Kampong Makassar.

In 1944 eighteen American Leader survivors were among 1,000 prisoners selected be sent to Japan. On 27 June 1944 their transport Tamahoko Maru was torpedoed by the USS Tang. The ship sank in just two minutes and only five of the American Leader crew members on board survived. At the same time, 15 other crew members were sent to Sumatra via Singapore to work on the Pakan Baroe railway where more died.

In September, nine American Leader crew members were among the 5,500 prisoners, conscripts, and laborers packed on board the Jun'yō Maru. On 18 September 1944, sailing in the Indian Ocean about 14 miles from the Sumatran coast, Jun'yō Maru was hit by two torpedoes from HMS Tradewind. Of the 9 American Leader personnel aboard the Jun'yō Maru only 5 survived.

Other crew members died from malaria, malnutrition, or overwork.

Of the 58 American Leader seamen and Naval Armed Guard on board when she was sunk only 28 returned home.

In 1946 the United States Lines acquired the C2-S-B1 cargo ship Twilight from the US Maritime Commission and renamed it American Leader (2) in honor of the first vessel's crew.
