= USS Goshen =

1944 Bayfield-class attack transport

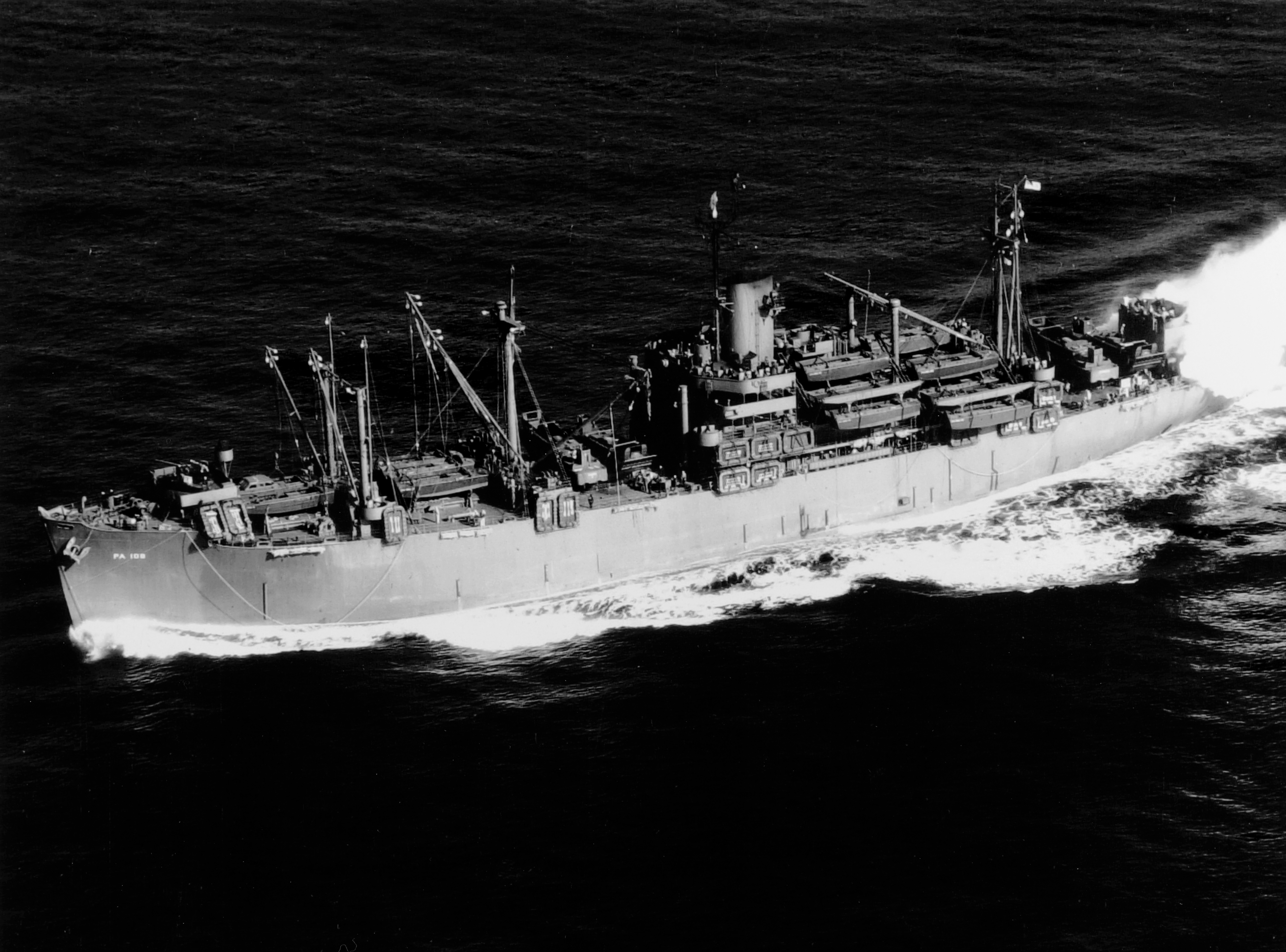

History

United States
- Namesake: Goshen County, Wyoming
- Builder: Western Pipe & Steel
- Laid down: 31 January 1944
- Launched: 29 June 1944
- Christened: Sea Hare
- Commissioned: 13 December 1944
- Decommissioned: 20 April 1946
- Renamed: USS Goshen, Canada Mail, California Mail, La Fayette.
- Honours and awards: One battle star for service in World War II.
- Fate: Scrapped August 1973
- Notes: WPS Hull No. 130; MC Hull No. 1553; Type C3-S-A2

General characteristics
- Class & type: Bayfield-class attack transport
- Displacement: 8,100 tons, 16,100 tons fully loaded
- Length: 492 ft (150 m)
- Beam: 69 ft 6 in (21.18 m)
- Draught: 26 ft 6 in (8.08 m)
- Propulsion: General Electric geared turbine, 2 × Foster Wheeler D-type boilers, single propeller, designed shaft horsepower 8,500
- Speed: 18 knots
- Boats & landing craft carried: 12 × LCVP, 4 × LCM (Mk-6), 3 × LCP(L) (MK-IV)
- Capacity: 4,800 tons (180,500 cu. ft).
- Complement: Crew: 51 officers, 524 enlisted; Flag: 43 officers, 108 enlisted.; Troops: 80 officers, 1,146 enlisted
- Armament: 2 × single 5-inch/38 cal. dual-purpose gun mounts, one fore and one aft.; 2 × twin 40 mm AA gun mounts forward, port and starboard.; 2 × single 40 mm AA gun mounts.; 18 × single 20 mm AA gun mounts.

USS Goshen (APA-108) was a Bayfield class attack transport in service with the United States Navy from 1944 to 1946. She was sold into commercial service in 1947 and was scrapped in 1973.

== History ==
Goshen, originally Sea Hare, was laid down by Western Pipe & Steel under a Maritime Commission contract on 31 January 1944. It was launched 29 June, acquired by the Navy 13 December and commissioned the same day.

=== Pacific War ===
After shakedown along the California coast, Goshen departed Long Beach 4 February 1945 for additional combat and amphibious training in the Hawaiian Islands. Embarking over 1,400 troops and officers at Honolulu, she departed there for duty in the Western Pacific. Goshen made brief stops at Ulithi and Eniwetok before proceeding to the Okinawa area where the bitter campaign to secure that Japanese-held fortress was already underway.

The transport arrived off Hagushi beaches Okinawa on 17 April and immediately commenced disembarking troops and unloading cargo. Goshen completed her task 5 days later and sailed for Saipan arriving there on the 27th. After loading mail and passengers at Saipan, Russell, Florida, and New Hebrides Islands, she sailed for the United States 18 May, arriving in San Francisco 3 June.

Goshen made another cruise to the Western Pacific in July carrying troops and cargo for the final month of the war. She was at Saipan when news of the Japanese acceptance of surrender terms was received. After the war Goshen operated between the Philippines and Japan for the next 4 months as she shuttled occupation troops and cargo among the Islands.

=== Operation Magic Carpet ===
In December the transport joined the growing number of ships engaged in Operation Magic Carpet – an organized project to bring the war veterans back home immediately. On 10 December she steamed out of Sasebo with over 1,400 America-bound Marines, finally arriving San Diego on the 28th.

In late January 1946 Goshen departed the West Coast arriving at Lynnhaven Roads, Virginia, on 12 February. She decommissioned at Norfolk 20 April and was delivered to WSA 2 May 1946.

=== Commercial service ===
Goshen was sold in 1947 to American Mail Lines Ltd., re-registered in Portland, Oregon, and renamed Canada Mail. In 1963 her name was changed to California Mail. In 1968, she was sold to Waterman Steamship, re-registered in New York, and renamed La Fayette. She remained in service with Waterman Steamship until 1973, when she was taken to Kaohsiung, Taiwan and scrapped in August of that year.

== Awards ==
Goshen received one battle star for World War II service.
