= James A. Talbot =

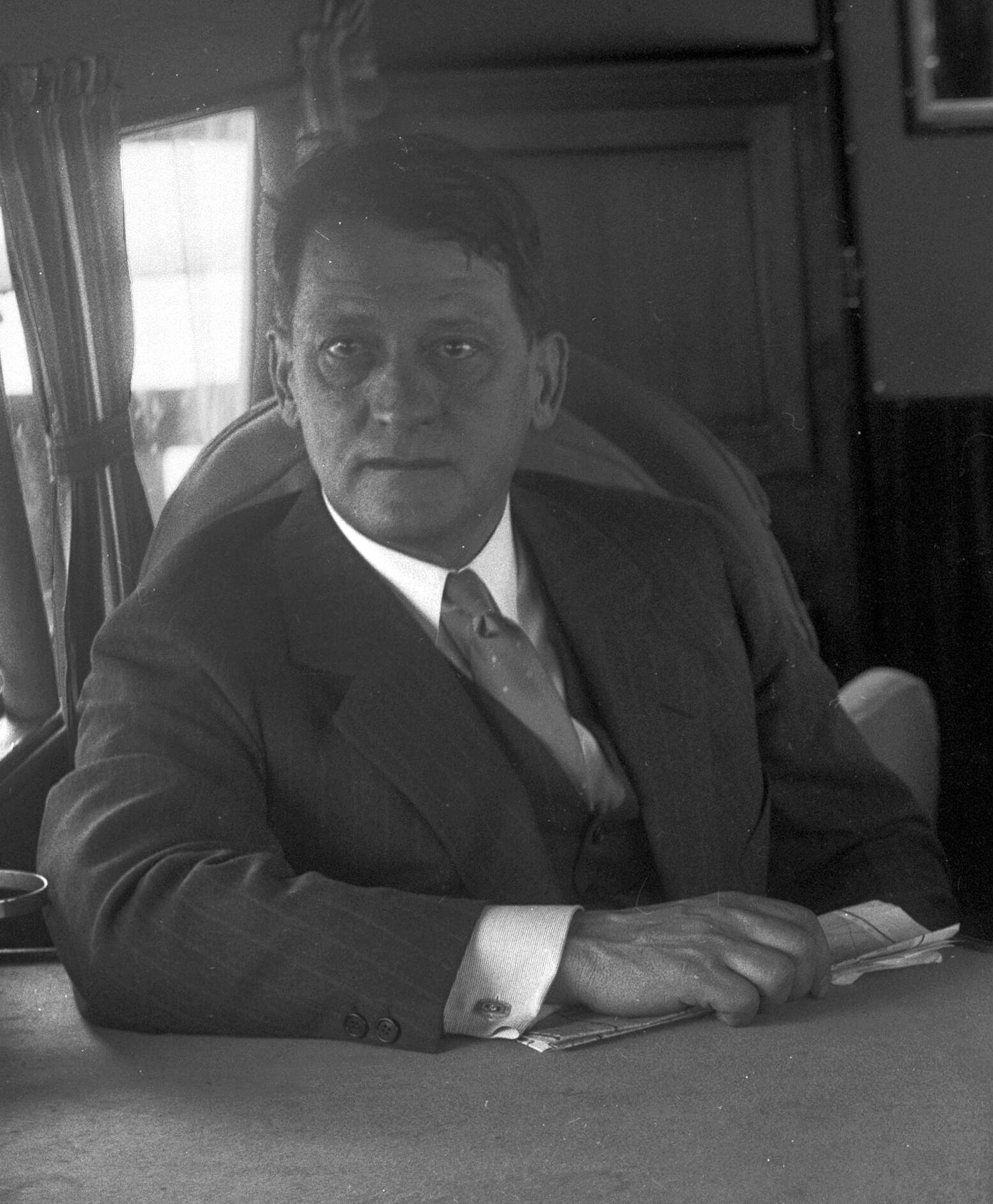
Talbot in 1928

James Arnold Talbot (December 13, 1879 in Paris, Kentucky – July 17, 1936) was an American businessman who became President of the Western Pipe and Steel Company of San Francisco, California in the 1910s, and who later became head of the Richfield Oil Company based in the same city. Talbot was interested in aviation and in the 1920s helped set up Western Air Express, an aviation company which instituted the first regularly scheduled passenger airline service in US history.

Talbot made an estimated $20,000,000 fortune in the 1920s but after the 1929 crash, his company Richfield Oil went into receivership and Talbot declared himself bankrupt. In June 1931, the California Corporation Commission accused him of falsifying company records and misusing company funds for his own and his family's benefit, and in 1932 he and two other Richfield company executives were sentenced to two-to-twenty-year terms in San Quentin. Released in March 1935, Talbot briefly returned to work in a real estate office before dying of heart failure, aged 56, in a San Francisco hospital on July 17, 1936.

== See also ==
- ARCO
