= USS Cascade =

Tender of the United States Navy

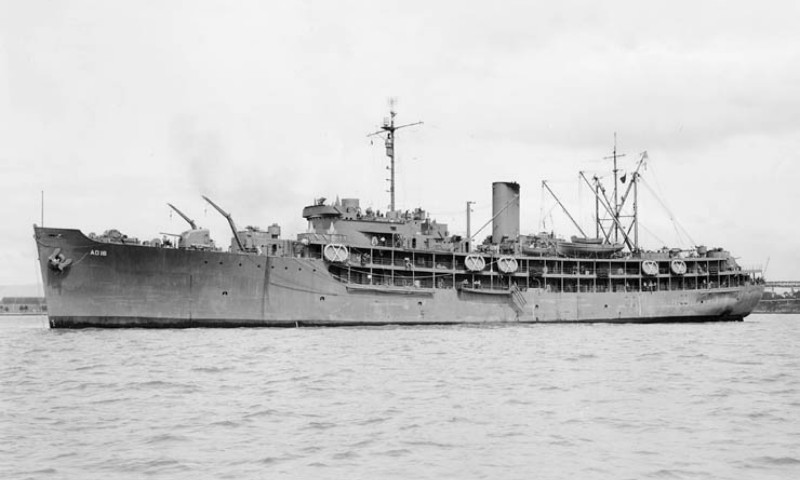
- USS Cascade (AD-16)

History

United States
- Name: USS Cascade
- Namesake: Cascade Range
- Builder: Western Pipe and Steel Company, San Francisco, California
- Launched: 6 June 1942
- Commissioned: 12 March 1943
- Decommissioned: 12 February 1947
- Recommissioned: 5 April 1951
- Decommissioned: 22 November 1974
- Stricken: 23 November 1974
- Motto: "We Serve"
- Fate: Sold for scrapping, 1 October 1975

General characteristics
- Type: Destroyer tender
- Displacement: 9,250 long tons (9,398 t)
- Length: 492 ft (150 m)
- Beam: 69 ft 9 in (21.26 m)
- Draft: 27 ft 6 in (8.38 m)
- Speed: 18 knots (33 km/h; 21 mph)
- Complement: 826
- Armament: 2 × 5"/38 caliber guns; 4 × quad 1.1"/75 caliber guns; 12 × single 20 mm AA guns

USS Cascade (AD-16), the only ship of its class, was a destroyer tender in the United States Navy.

Originally designed as a passenger-freighter, the Cascade was launched on 6 June 1942 by Western Pipe and Steel Company in San Francisco, California. The ship was sponsored by Mrs. Charles W. Crosse, wife of Rear Admiral Charles W. Crosse, USN. It was turned over to the Matson Navigation Company of San Francisco, California, for outfitting in October 1942. The Cascade was commissioned on 12 March 1943.

== Service history ==
=== 1943–1944 ===
Cascade cleared San Francisco on 12 June 1943 for Pearl Harbor, where she began her war time duty of tending destroyers. As the war moved westward, Cascade followed, bringing her support close to the action areas. From November 1943, she was stationed successively at Kwajalein, Eniwetok, and Ulithi, while the ships she served ranged the Pacific, escorting convoys, screening carrier task forces, supporting invasions, and carrying out many other tasks with typical destroyer versatility. Cascade was the flagship of Service Squadron 4 in 1943.

In June 1945, Cascade sailed to Okinawa, where she endured the suicide raids and typhoon weather. She left Okinawan waters in September to serve in Wakayama, Japan and later at Tokyo, Japan, supporting the occupation until March 1946, when she sailed for the East Coast. Cascade was decommissioned and placed in service in reserve at Philadelphia, Pennsylvania, on 12 February 1947.

In the autumn of 1943 Admiral Nimitz ordered the creation of two service squadrons. These two squadrons would provide mobile service to the fleet as it moved across the Pacific — with one service as fleet base while the second remained to the rear. As the fleet captured new sites the rear squadron would move to the front and act as fleet base.

Service Squadron 4 was commissioned on 1 November 1943. The squadron was made up of 24 vessels and would be based in Funafuti Atoll. Cascade was the flagship for the squadron. The repair ships Phaon (ARB-3) and Vestal (AR-4) and 21 other ships comprised the squadron. On 21 November 1943 the Cascade arrived at Funafuti, where she remained until February 1944. During the stay at Funafuti the Cascade serviced numerous fleet vessels — including 10 destroyers and eight destroyer escorts.

The second service squadron titled Service Squadron 10 was commissioned on 15 January 1944 at Pearl Harbor.

After the capture of Kwajalein in February 1944 the Cascade moved from Funafuti to Kwajalein. On 17 March 1944 Squadron 4 was absorbed into Squadron 10.

The Cascade remained at Kwajalein until May 1944 when she moved to Eniwetok.

=== Ulithi ===
On 4 October 1944 Service Squadron 10 began leaving Eniwetok for Ulithi. On 8 October 1944 Cascade sailed for Ulithi.

Following operations at Leyte, Task Force 38 arrived at Ulithi on 24 December. Cascade repaired the Buchanan (DD-484).

On 4 March 1945 the destroyers Ringgold (DD-500) and Yarnall (DD-541) collided while conducting night battle drills while en route to Ulithi as part of Task Group 58.1. Ringgold's bow was sheared off to frame 22 and she was extensively damaged to frame 26 port and 38 starboard. Yarnall's bow was bent to the right and upward; her bow broke off and sank during towing. Upon arrival at Ulithi the Ringgold went alongside the Cascade for installation of a temporary bow. In early April the Ringgold departed for Pearl Harbor for permanent repairs.

On 8 March 1944 the Commander Service Squadron 10 created the Mobile Fleet Motion Picture Sub-Exchange No. 1. The Prairie operated the north exchange and the Cascade operated a branch exchange to service ships in the southern anchorage of Ulithi. The program issued 100 35-mm films and 652 16-mm films per day during December 1944.

=== Court of Inquiry ===
In December 1944 a court of inquiry was held in the wardroom of the Cascade, at Ulithi, regarding the loss of three ships and over 800 men from the US Third Fleet during a typhoon. The Third Fleet was under the command of William F. (Bull) Halsey Jr. during the typhoon in mid-December 1944. Admiral Chester A. Nimitz, CINCPAC, was in attendance at the court. Forty-three-year-old Captain Herbert K. Gates, of the Cascade, was the judge advocate for the court. Gates was an expert in mechanical and marine engineering.

=== Mediterranean, 1951–1974 ===
Recommissioned on 5 April 1951, Cascade was based in Newport, Rhode Island, as tender for the many destroyers home-ported there. From Newport she cruised to the Caribbean and the Mediterranean to support the destroyers deployed there. During this time Cascade served as flagship, and carried the flag of commander, Service Force, 6th Fleet, and the flag of commander, Destroyer Flotilla 6. She also served as flagship for commander, Destroyer Force, Atlantic. She served in this role as flagship and tender up through 1963. From 1970 to 1974, the Cascade was forward deployed to the Mediterranean, homeported in Naples Italy. When was in the port of Naples Cascade was used even like a set for a scene of Italian Movie Polvere di stelle in 1973 with Alberto Sordi, Monica Vitti and John Phillip Law.

=== Decommissioning and sale ===
The Cascade was decommissioned on 22 November 1974 and struck from the Naval Register on 23 November 1974. She was subsequently sold for scrap to Luria Brother of Brooklyn, New York, and dismantled at the Gulmar Yard in Brownsville, Texas starting September 1975. The anchor, along with mooring cleats, ended up at the front entrance of Danville High School in Danville, KY. The anchor has become a symbol of stability and security to all Danville Admirals. It keeps school spirit from drifting and stands as a constant reminder of admiral tradition. The anchor has been on loan from the Navy to DHS since it was placed.

== Awards ==
Cascade received one battle star for World War II service. the USS Cascade AD16 embarked on the final cruise to the U.S. naval base in Norfolk when, at sea, it encountered a mechanical breaking of the main reduction gear, which led to shutting down at sea. we drifted for several days without power; the skeleton crew was about half of the complement population. after I was ordered to shut down the SSTG GENERATOR THROTTLE valve on top of the generator, there was nothing else to do about the danger of a greater problem the SSTG Ships service turbine generator ran on two boilers that announced general quarters and the mooring lines snapped away steam to the activated generator turbine fans. system the power was reduced to half of its potential. eventually, the ship reached Norfolk and as 3 days passed the ship's high sea suction manifold broke and the Cascade took on water from the broken manifold. the ship rested on its keel at 45 degrees this would have been much worse at sea. I was on the decommissioning clean-up crew. I would suggest this is to be taken as a factual story I was there and I will never forget this traumatic experience. the correct record would be in the log unless it was altered.
