= USS Goodhue =

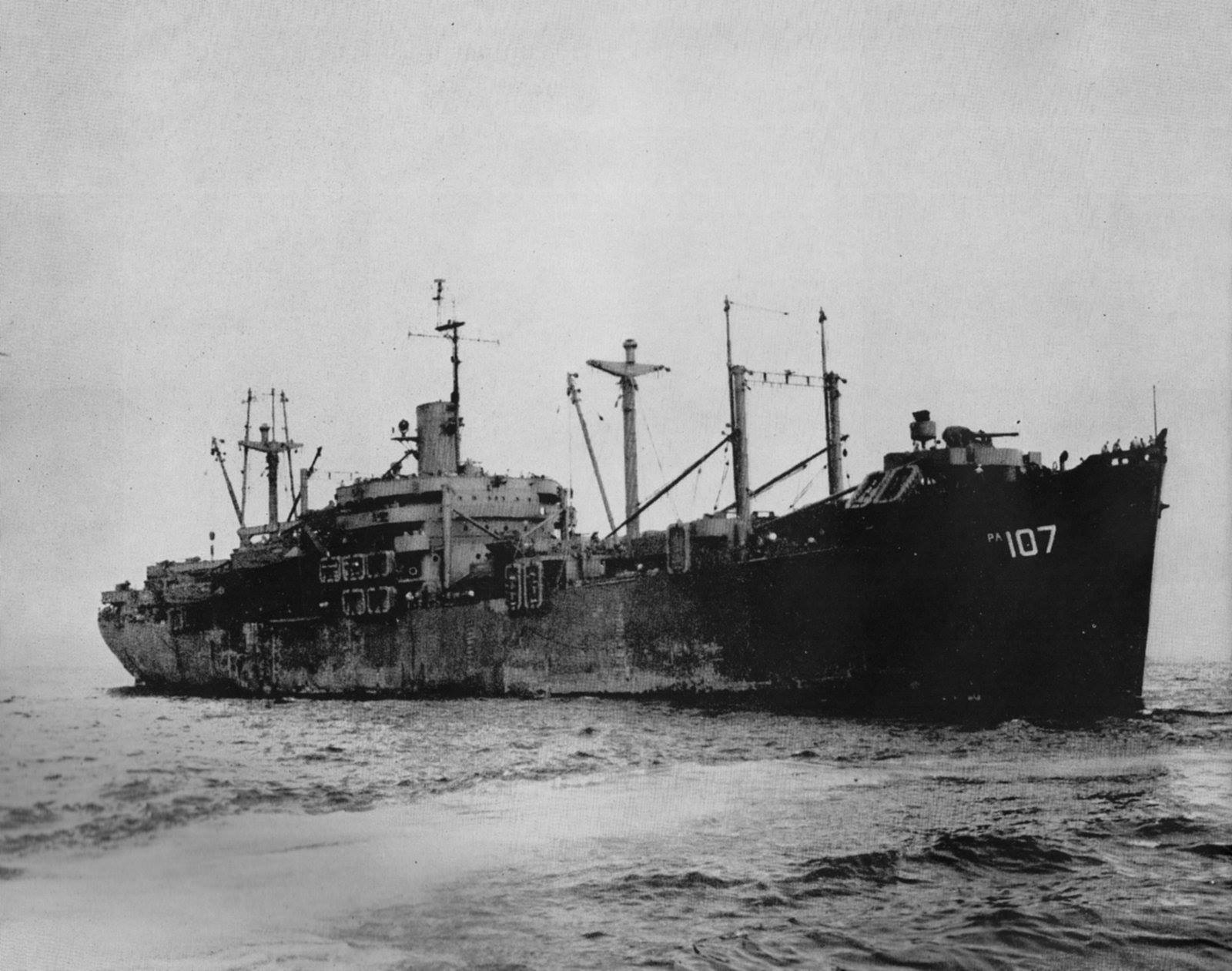

History

United States
- Name: USS Goodhue
- Namesake: Goodhue County, Minnesota
- Builder: Western Pipe & Steel
- Laid down: 7 January 1944
- Launched: 31 May 1944
- Christened: Sea Wren
- Commissioned: 11 November 1944
- Decommissioned: 5 April 1946
- Renamed: Goodhue, Hawaiian Citizen.
- Identification: IMO number: 5144538
- Honours and awards: One battle star for service in World War II.
- Fate: Scrapped March 1982
- Notes: WPS Hull No. 129; MC Hull No. 1552; Type C3-S-A2

General characteristics
- Class & type: Bayfield-class attack transport
- Displacement: 8,100 tons, 16,100 tons fully loaded
- Length: 492 ft (150 m)
- Beam: 69 ft 6 in (21.18 m)
- Draught: 26 ft 6 in (8.08 m)
- Propulsion: General Electric geared turbine, 2 x Foster Wheeler D-type boilers, single propeller, designed shaft horsepower 8,500
- Speed: 18 knots
- Boats & landing craft carried: 12 x LCVP, 4 x LCM (Mk-6), 3 x LCP(L) (MK-IV)
- Capacity: 4,800 tons (180,500 cu. ft).
- Complement: Crew: 51 officers, 524 enlisted; Flag: 43 officers, 108 enlisted.; Troops: 80 officers, 1,146 enlisted
- Armament: 2 × single 5-inch/38 cal. dual purpose gun mounts, one fore and one aft.; 2 × twin 40mm AA gun mounts forward, port and starboard.; 2 × single 40mm AA gun mounts.; 18 × single 20mm AA gun mounts.

USS Goodhue (APA-107) was a Bayfield-class attack transport in service with the United States Navy from 1944 to 1946. She was sold into commercial service in 1947 and was scrapped in 1982.

== History ==
Goodhue – named after Goodhue County, Minnesota – was initially laid down as Sea Wren on 7 January 1944 by Western Pipe & Steel of San Francisco, California. She was launched under Maritime Commission contract on 31 May, transferred to the Navy and commissioned on 11 November 1944.

=== Pacific War ===
Goodhue underwent shakedown training off San Pedro and took part in amphibious training exercises 8–21 December off San Diego, preparing for her part in the massive landings still to come in the Pacific War. The ship loaded vehicles at San Diego and sailed 4 January 1945 for Seeadler Harbor, Admiralty Islands, where she arrived 21 January. There the vessel loaded passengers and cargo and sailed for Hollandia, New Guinea, anchoring 4 February.

After steaming to Leyte Gulf 4–12 February, Goodhue carried supplies to various bases in the area and took part in amphibious training until 25 February. She then began to load troops and supplies for the Okinawa invasion, as American forces neared the last stop in their victorious sweep across the Pacific. More landing drills followed, after which the transport got underway in convoy for Okinawa 21 March. Arriving off Kerama Retto 26 March, Goodhue and the other transports put ashore troops to secure the island group as a base for the coming invasion of nearby Okinawa.

Goodhue remained at Kerama Retto during the initial landings 1 April and while returning to sea the evening of 2 April underwent a heavy air attack. As gunners from Goodhue, screen ships, and other transports fired furiously, suicide planes attempted to crash the loaded ships. USS Henrico took a kamikaze hit on her bridge and Dickerson was also crashed. Goodhue's gunners splashed a plane on the starboard quarter, but another headed directly for her from dead ahead. Unable to bring her full firepower to bear in that direction, Goodhue could not divert the attacker, which hit the mainmast and fell astern of the ship. Exploding bombs from the aircraft caused many casualties and fires, killing 27 and wounding 117, but the ship did not suffer serious structural damage and was able to continue. Subsequently, Goodhue was based at Kerama Retto repairing battle damage.

Goodhue rejoined her transport squadron 10 April. She transferred her Army Medical Detachment to Ie Shima by LST-17 April and landed the main body of her embarked troops 20 April. Nearing the beaches in a predawn operation, she landed her reinforcements and retired, undergoing air attack again that afternoon. Cargo was off loaded under cover of smokescreens by 24 April and 2 days later Goodhue joined a convoy bound for Ulithi.

The transport arrived Ulithi 30 April after a grueling month at Okinawa, and departed 22 May for San Francisco. There she loaded additional troops for the Pacific fighting and sailed again 25 June. Steaming by way of Eniwetok and Ulithi, Goodhue arrived Manila 21 July and disembarked troops. She then sailed for Lingayen Gulf, loading troops, and engaged in training operations 7–13 August. Word of the Japanese surrender arrived 15 August as another assault was about to take place.

Goodhue's next assignment was to carry occupation troops to Japan, and she loaded soldiers at Subic Bay and Cebu, Philippine Islands. The convoy arrived Sagami Bay, Japan, 8 September. Unloading her troops, the transport brought on board nearly 1,000 liberated prisoners of war – British, Dutch, and Norwegian as well as American. She sailed for Manila 12 September and disembarked the men 6 days later.

=== Operation Magic Carpet ===
From there Goodhue visited Cebu and Subic Bay to load veterans on Operation Magic Carpet, the giant task of transporting the veteran soldiers and sailors back to the United States. Sailing 11 October, the ship arrived San Pedro, Los Angeles, via Pearl Harbor 3 November 1945. She made one more voyage to the Pacific bringing back veterans of the fighting in the Philippines, and sailed from San Francisco 2 February 1946 for Hampton Roads, Virginia, via the Panama Canal. Goodhue arrived 19 February and was decommissioned on 5 April.

=== Commercial service ===
Goodhue was turned over to the Maritime Commission who sold her to the Matson Navigation Company on 15 April 1947. The vessel was renamed Hawaiian Citizen and put into service transporting cargo and 12 passengers between California and Hawaii. In August 1959 the vessel was converted into a container ship. The passenger accommodations were removed and net tonnage increased. Hawaiian Citizen thus re-entered service in April 1960 as the first all-containerized vessel operating from the West Coast.

Hawaiian Citizen was operated by the Oceanic Steamship Company from 8 March 1971 until being returned to service with Matson on 9 January 1976. The vessel was laid up in San Francisco on 25 January 1981. She was sold for scrap to the Chi Shun Hua Steel Company of Kaohsiung, Taiwan on 25 November of the same year. On 6 December 1981, Hawaiian Citizen departed on her final voyage, under tow from San Francisco.

== Awards ==
Goodhue received one battle star for World War II service.
