= USS Bayfield =

US Navy Bayfield-class attack transport in service 1943-1968

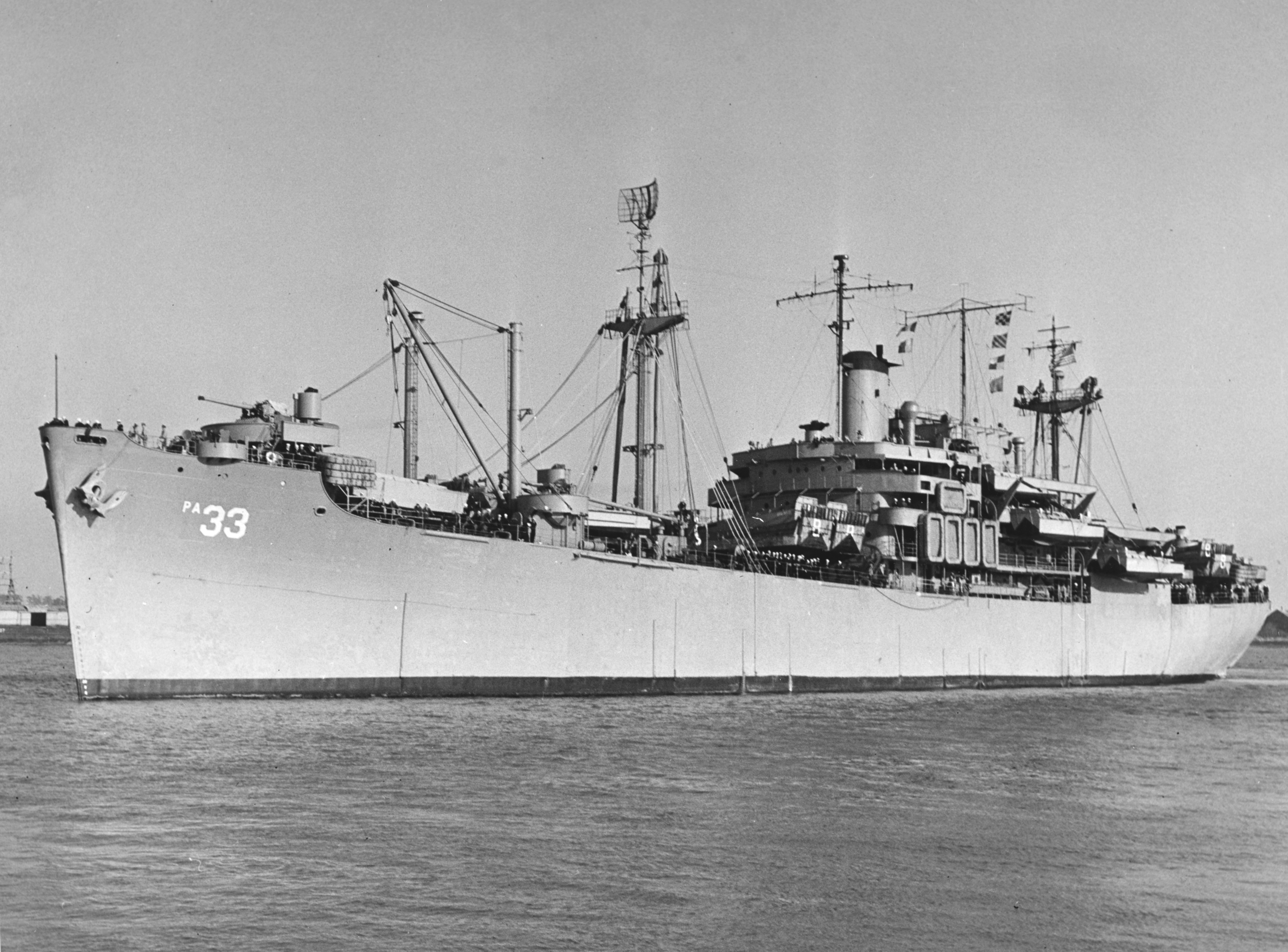
- USS Bayfield (APA-33) at Charleston, South Carolina, 4 January 1950

History

United States
- Name: USS Bayfield
- Namesake: Bayfield County, Wisconsin
- Builder: Western Pipe & Steel
- Yard number: 87
- Laid down: 14 November 1942
- Launched: 15 February 1943
- Sponsored by: Mrs. J. E. Schmeltzer
- Christened: Sea Bass (II)
- Completed: 30 June 1943
- Commissioned: 20 November 1943
- Decommissioned: 28 June 1968
- Renamed: USS Bayfield
- Stricken: 1 October 1968
- Honours and awards: Four battle stars for service in World War II, four for Korean War service, two for the Vietnam War.
- Fate: Scrapped September 1969
- Notes: MC Hull No. 275.; Type C3-S-A2.

General characteristics
- Class & type: Bayfield-class attack transport
- Displacement: 8,100 tons, 16,100 tons fully loaded
- Length: 492 ft (150 m)
- Beam: 69 ft 6 in (21.18 m)
- Draught: 26 ft 6 in (8.08 m)
- Propulsion: General Electric geared turbine, 2 x Combustion Engineering D-type boilers, single propeller, designed shaft horsepower 8,500
- Speed: 18 knots
- Boats & landing craft carried: 12 x LCVP, 4 x LCM (Mk-6), 3 x LCP(L) (MK-IV)
- Capacity: 200,000 cubic feet (5,700 m^{3}), 4,700 tons
- Complement: Crew: 51 officers, 524 enlisted; Flag: 43 officers, 108 enlisted.; Troops: 80 officers, 1,146 enlisted
- Armament: 2 × single 5-inch/38 cal. dual purpose gun mounts, one fore and one aft.; 2 × twin 40mm AA gun mounts forward, port and starboard.; 2 × single 40mm AA gun mounts.; 18 × single 20mm AA gun mounts.

USS Bayfield (APA-33) was a Bayfield-class attack transport built for the United States Navy during World War II, the lead ship in her class. Named for Bayfield County, Wisconsin, she was the only U.S. Naval vessel to bear the name.

== Construction ==
Bayfield was originally laid down as SS Sea Bass under a Maritime Commission contract on 14 November 1942 at San Francisco, California by the Western Pipe and Steel Company. The hull was assigned to the Navy as naval transport AP-78 and was redesignated attack transport APA-33 on 1 February 1943.

APA-33 was launched on 15 February. The Navy acquired the vessel on 30 June, renamed it Bayfield, and placed it in reduced commission the same day. Bayfield left San Francisco on 7 July and arrived in Brooklyn, New York on 29 July, where it was decommissioned and converted by the Atlantic Basic Iron Works to an attack transport. The completed ship was then commissioned USS Bayfield (APA-33) on 20 November 1943 with Captain Lyndon Spencer, USCG, in command. Following a shakedown cruise in Chesapeake Bay and subsequent repairs at Norfolk Navy Yard, she conducted amphibious training in January 1944, underwent additional repair, and was declared ready for sea on 3 February.

== Amphibious operations in Europe ==
=== Invasion of Normandy ===
She received orders to New York to embark troops for service in Europe. On 11 February the ship departed New York with a convoy bound for the British Isles and arrived at Glasgow, Scotland on 22 February. From there she moved south to the Isle of Portland, England to await orders.

On 11 March Bayfield made the short run to Plymouth and joined a group of amphibious ships that then set course for western Scotland. The ships reached the River Clyde on 14 March and carried out landing exercises there through 21 March in preparation for the European invasion at Normandy.

On 29 March she bore the flag of Commander, Force "U" (Rear Admiral Don Pardee Moon) and served as headquarters for planning the landings on "Utah Beach." She joined with other Normandy-bound ships in practicing a variety of maneuvers and tactical operations during short underway periods until 26 April, when full-scale rehearsals took place through 4 May.

Bayfield anchored again at Plymouth on 29 April and on 7 May began embarking troops of the 8th Infantry Regiment (U.S. 4th Infantry Division) and the 87th Chemical Battalion. By 5 June the invasion force completed all preparations and got underway for the Bay of the Seine. Passing along a swept channel marked by lighted buoys, Bayfield and the other transports reached their designated positions early on the morning of 6 June and debarked their troops. Hall of Fame baseball player Yogi Berra was a gunner's mate on-board Bayfield on D-Day.

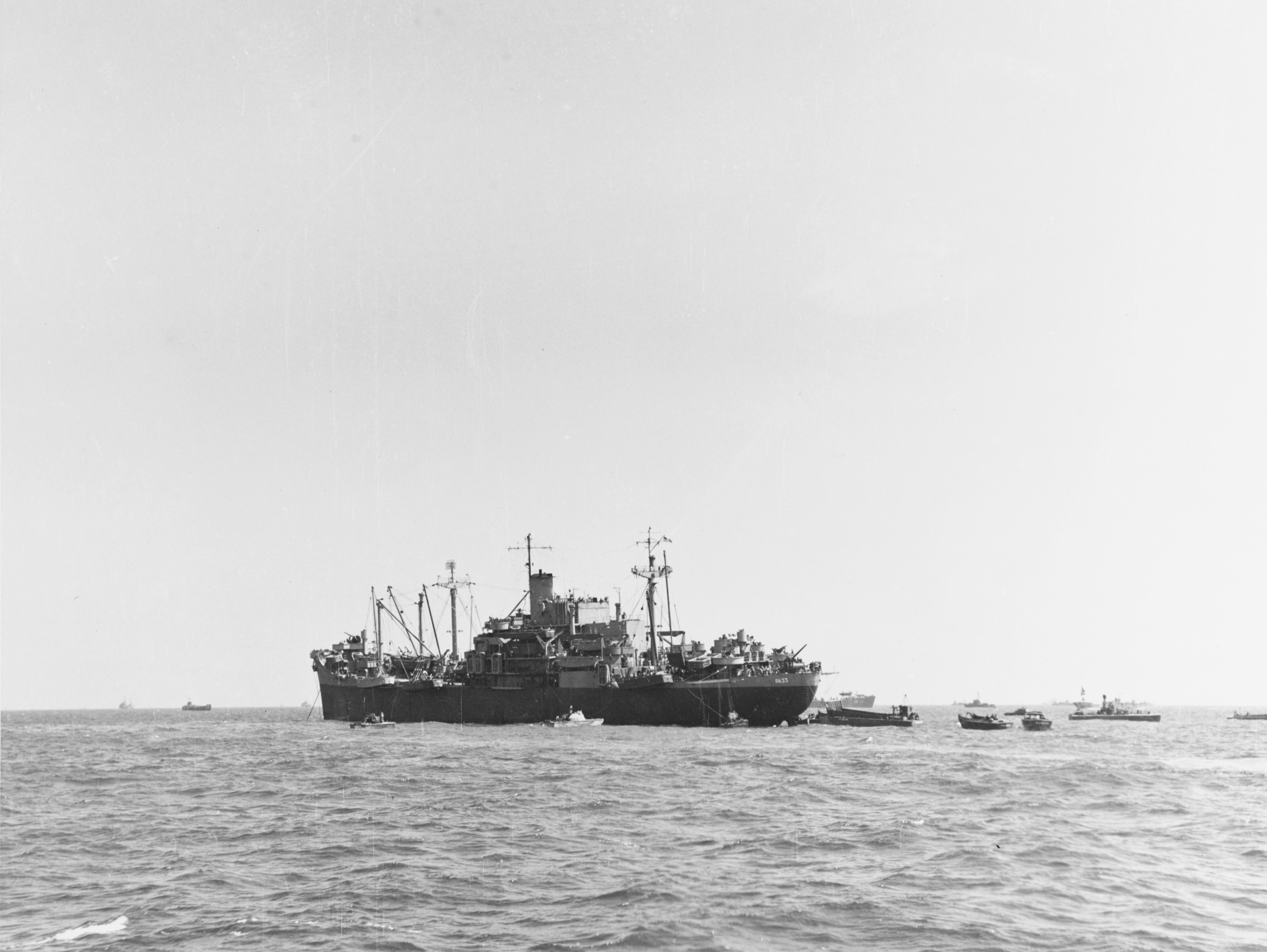
USS Bayfield (APA-33) loads landing craft for the "Utah Beach" landings on "D-Day", 6 June 1944.

After disembarking her troops, Bayfield began service as a supply and hospital ship in addition to continuing her duties as a flagship. Those assignments kept her off the Normandy coast while other transports rapidly unloaded troops and cargo and then returned to England. On 7 June she shifted to an anchorage five miles off the beach and made smoke that night to protect Utah anchorage from Luftwaffe attacks.

=== Invasion of Southern France ===
On 25 June Bayfield returned to port, and on 5 July joined Task Group (TG) 120.6 bound for Algeria. Upon its arrival at Oran on 10 July the group was dissolved, and Bayfield continued on to Italy. At Naples, Rear Admiral Moon assumed command of Task Force 8 or "Camel" Force, for the invasion of southern France. Plans and procedures were refined, and full-scale rehearsals were held off beaches near Salerno between 31 July and 6 August.

Following the suicide of Rear Admiral Moon, a victim of what would become known as "battle fatigue" on 5 August, Rear Admiral Spencer Lewis took command of TF 87 on 13 August, and Bayfield sailed for the southern coast of France. Early on 15 August, she put troops of the U.S. 36th Infantry Division ashore east of Saint-Raphaël in the Golfe de Fréjus.

As its target, "Camel" Force assaulted the best defended section of the coast, an area where the Argens River flows into the Mediterranean, and the hard fighting there kept Bayfield in the vicinity of the Golfe de Fréjus for almost a month. She returned to Naples on 10 September and three days later received orders to join a transatlantic convoy at Oran. The attack transport steamed by way of Bizerte to embark passengers for transportation back to the United States and left Oran with her convoy on 16 September. She arrived in Norfolk, Virginia on 26 September, disembarked her passengers, and entered the Norfolk Navy Yard for overhaul.

== Operations in the Pacific ==
The attack transport spent the first week of November preparing for duty in the Pacific. She loaded supplies and got underway on 7 November for the Panama Canal, in transit to Hawaii. Bayfield arrived at Pearl Harbor on 26 November. The next day, she broke the flag of Commander, Transport Squadron (TransRon) 15, Commodore H. C. Flanagan. Between 6 December and 18 January 1945 the ship participated in five practice amphibious landings at Maui.

=== Invasions of Iwo Jima and Okinawa ===
Bayfield departed Pearl Harbor on 27 January and touched at Eniwetok for fuel before arriving at Saipan on 11 February. Following rehearsal off Tinian on 12 and 13 February, the Joint Expeditionary Force (TF 51) got underway on 16 February for Iwo Jima.

Bayfield debarked troops from the 4th Marine Division on D-Day, 19 February, and while anchored off Iwo Jima for the remainder of the month served both as a hospital and a prisoner-of-war ship. Bayfield returned to the Marianas on 1 March to prepare for the Ryukyu Islands campaign. On 6 and 7 March she loaded supplies and equipment of the 2nd Marine Division and got underway on the 11th for rehearsal exercises preparatory to the invasion of Okinawa.

Her task force left the Marianas on 27 March and hove-to off the southeastern coast of Okinawa on Easter morning, 1 April. As part of TG 51.2, the attack transport and other units of Demonstration Group "Charlie" simulated a landing on the south coast to draw attention away from the actual landings at the Hagushi beaches. Although the ruse failed to fool the Japanese, TG 51.2 received more Japanese air attacks than did the real landings. The Hinsdale and USS LST-884 were both severely damaged by kamikazes.

The group continued the demonstration the next day and then retired seaward to await orders. Bayfield's troops were not required at Okinawa, and on 11 April she got underway for Saipan, where they were disembarked on the 14th. She then remained at Saipan undergoing maintenance and repairs until 4 June.

Bayfield sailed for the Solomons on 4 June to load cargo and move it closer to the fighting. She stopped at Tulagi on the 12th and at Espiritu Santo in the New Hebrides on the 17th. She sailed on 1 July for the Marianas and unloaded at Tinian on 9 July and Saipan on 13 July. After taking on passengers, Bayfield got underway for Guam where she arrived on 14 July. Two days later, the transport set course for California.

=== Occupation and demobilization cruises ===
In San Francisco on 30 July, Bayfield went into drydock for a major overhaul before the expected invasion of the Japanese home islands. However, hostilities ended on 15 August while the transport was still undergoing repairs. Ten days later, Bayfield departed San Francisco, bound via Eniwetok, Marshall Islands for Subic Bay and Zamboanga in the Philippines. At Eniwetok on 7 September, revised orders directed her to Tacloban, Philippines, where she arrived on 14 September and reported to Commander Amphibious Group 3 for duty in the occupation of Aomori, Japan. On 17 September Bayfield embarked soldiers and equipment of the U.S. 81st Infantry Division. The landings at Aomori took place according to schedule on 25 September.

After discharging the troops, Bayfield returned to the Marianas on 4 October and joined the "Operation Magic Carpet" fleet. She embarked a full complement of returning veterans at Saipan and at Tinian before heading home on 7 October. Upon her arrival at San Pedro, California on 20 October, she disembarked passengers including the TransRon 15 staff. Following repairs, the ship carried occupation troops to Korea in November 1945 and January 1946, returning from each voyage with a full contingent of veterans.

== Post-World War II service ==
=== Atomic testing ===
In March, the attack transport was ordered to Pearl Harbor for "Operation Crossroads", the atomic bomb tests scheduled to take place at Bikini Atoll in July. She set sail from Oahu on 2 April and proceeded via Kwajalein and Eniwetok to Bikini with supplies and equipment. She returned to Pearl Harbor early in May to take on more cargo and arrived back at Bikini on 1 June. Bayfield then served as a barracks ship for the crews of the target ships.

On 30 June she took station 22 miles from the site of the initial Test "ABLE", an airburst detonated at 09:00 on 1 July 1946. After the explosion, Bayfield reentered the lagoon and anchored at 17:28 that day. She remained there until 18 July providing berthing spaces for members of the survey and monitoring teams until they were able to return to their own ships. She then got underway to participate in a one-day rehearsal for test "BAKER".

On 24 July Bayfield again departed the lagoon and at 08:35 on the 25th, observed the underwater detonation from a distance of 15 miles. She returned to the anchorage at dawn the following morning and remained until 3 August. She stopped at Kwajalein to check contamination levels, resumed her journey on 8 August, and arrived at San Francisco on the 20th. On 28 August 1946, Bayfield arrived at Puget Sounds Naval Shipyard (PSNS) in Bremerton Washington for further decontamination as a result of the atomic blast test at the Bikini Atoll test site.

=== 1946–1960 ===
The transport continued to serve with the Pacific Fleet making two more cruises to China until joining the Atlantic Fleet in November 1949. Based at Norfolk, Virginia she operated along the eastern seaboard and in the West Indies until mid-August 1950, when the outbreak of hostilities in Korea on 25 June called her back to the Pacific.

Bayfield arrived in Kobe, Japan, on 16 September and, the next day, got underway for Inchon, Korea. She spent the next seven months providing logistic support to the United Nations forces in Korea. She returned to San Diego on 26 May 1951 and, except for a cruise to Japan and back in September 1951, did not return to the Far East until March 1952, again to support troops in Korea.

Vietnamese refugees receive food on board USS Bayfield while en route from Haiphong to Saigon

During the next two years, Bayfield made three more cruises to the Orient and performed special duty in August and September 1954, assisting in the evacuation of refugees that resulted from the partition of Vietnam into a communist north and an anticommunist south. As one of more than 40 amphibious ships employed in Operation Passage to Freedom, the transport provided food, shelter, and care to the evacuees as she carried them south to Saigon. She returned to San Diego on 9 October and commenced a routine of alternating local training operations along the West Coast with deployments to the Far East.

On 26 March 1955, Bayfield arrived at the site of the Pan Am Flight 845/26 ditching in the Pacific Ocean and rescued the 19 survivors.

=== 1961–1968 ===
In February 1961 Bayfield changed home port from San Diego to Long Beach where she served as the flagship for the Commander Amphibious Squadron (PhibRon) 7. Her first assignment saw her underway for a major amphibious exercise in Hawaii. During that operation, the transport received orders dispatching her to the western Pacific to bolster the 7th Fleet during the Laotian crisis. The tension soon subsided, however, and Bayfield returned to Hawaii to finish the interrupted training exercise before continuing on back to the West Coast.

The ship deployed to the Far East again in January 1962 and spent most of the overseas tour participating in exercises and showing the flag. Near the end of the assignment, Bayfield received orders to Buckner Bay, Okinawa, where she stood by during another crisis in Laos. Late in July 1962 she returned to Long Beach and resumed operations out of her home port. In October she had to forego another major amphibious exercise in Hawaii because of the Cuban Missile Crisis. The transport embarked elements of the 1st Marine Division and headed through the Panama Canal to support forces engaged in the quarantine of Cuba. With the end of that crisis, Bayfield returned to Long Beach on 15 December.

Following a regular overhaul at Willamette Shipyard in Richmond, California and refresher training out of San Diego until 6 June 1963, the attack transport resumed local training operations. On 17 September she embarked from Long Beach on another deployment to the western Pacific. Bayfield made a port call in Hawaii for three weeks, then resumed her cruise west on 16 October and arrived at Subic Bay in the Philippines on 31 October. She made a visit to Hong Kong during the latter part of November, returning to Subic Bay near the end of the month. The ship spent December operating in the waters between Okinawa and Japan, stopping in Numazu, Yokosuka, Nagoya and Sasebo.

Bayfield also carried cold weather training called "Operation Backpack" at Pohang, South Korea and joined the Nationalist Chinese in exercises near Taiwan during the first two months of 1964. She disembarked her Marine contingent at Buckner Bay, Okinawa, in mid-March and headed back to the West Coast, arriving in Long Beach on 6 April. Bayfield operated out of Long Beach for more than a year and then deployed to South Vietnam in May 1965.

Bayfield returned to the West Coast in December and resumed local training missions in the Long Beach and San Diego operating areas early in 1966. Later that spring, she began a five-month overhaul at the Todd Shipyard in Alameda, California. Getting underway from Todd Shipyard "Bayfield" sailed to Mare Island to take on ammunition then proceeding on to Hunters Point Naval Shipyard (San Francisco). "Bayfield" was in Hunters Point during the Race Riots and crew members were escorted back to ship under police escort from Market Street in San Francisco. The ship left the yard on 26 September and spent several weeks at San Diego for amphibious maneuvers and refresher training.

Bayfield embarked on another tour of duty in the Far East on 28 December, refueled at Pearl Harbor early in January 1967, and continued on westward. She touched at Okinawa on 19 January and continued on to the Philippines. At Subic Bay, ComPhibRon 7 shifted his flag to the transport and she got underway for Vietnam on 31 January.

=== Vietnam War ===
The ship served as a floating barracks at Da Nang until 15 February 1967 and then sailed for Okinawa to take on Marines and equipment for rotation to the Vietnamese combat zone. During that operation, Bayfield anchored at the mouth of the Cua Viet, and her embarked Marines went ashore to rotate with units that had been serving eight miles upriver at Dong Ha. Bayfield returned to Okinawa on 13 March.

In April, she loaded troops for another landing and put them ashore south of Da Nang on 28 April. The transport continued to serve off the coast of Vietnam until 28 May, ferrying troops between points as needed and transporting casualties to the hospital ship Sanctuary. Relieved by the Duluth, Bayfield headed home, via Sasebo, Hong Kong and Pearl Harbor.

In August 1965 she participated in Operation Starlite was the first major offensive regimental size action conducted by a purely U.S. military unit during the Vietnam War. Followed by Operation Piranha which was a US Marine Corps operation that took place on the Batangan Peninsula southeast of Chu Lai, lasting from 7 to 10 September 1965.

Bayfield earned four battle stars for World War II service, four for Korean service, and two for service in Vietnam.

== Decommissioning ==
USS Bayfield carried out exercises until 27 December, at which time she was placed in a reduced readiness status. Berthed next to the Talladega at Long Beach, Bayfield prepared for inactivation. She was placed out of commission, in reserve, on 28 June 1968. A board of inspection and survey found the transport to be "unfit for further service", and her name struck from the Naval Vessel Register on 1 October 1968. She was sold to the Levin Metals Corporation of San Pedro, California on 15 September 1969 and scrapped.
