= German auxiliary cruiser Michel =

German auxiliary cruiser

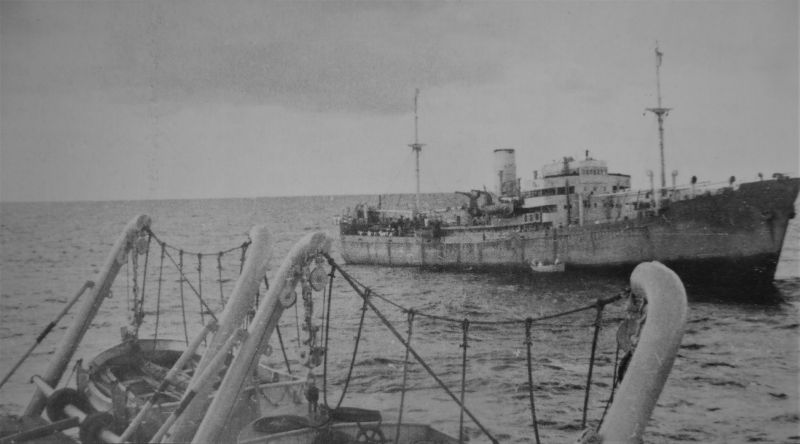

History

Nazi Germany
- Name: Bielsko
- Operator: Gdynia-America-Line
- Builder: Danziger Werft, Danzig
- Launched: April 1939
- Fate: Requisitioned by Kriegsmarine, 1939

Kriegsmarine
- Name: Michel
- Namesake: Deutscher Michel
- Operator: Kriegsmarine
- Commissioned: 7 September 1941
- Renamed: Bonn (1939); Michel (1941)
- Reclassified: Hospital ship (1939); Auxiliary cruiser (1941)
- Nickname(s): HSK-9; Schiff-28; Raider H
- Fate: Sunk on 17 October 1943 east of Yokohama

General characteristics
- Tonnage: 4,740 GRT
- Displacement: 10,900 tons
- Length: 132 m (433 ft 1 in)
- Beam: 16.8 m (55 ft 1 in)
- Draught: 7.4 m (24 ft 3 in)
- Propulsion: 2 MAN 8 cyl. diesel, one shaft, 6,650 shp (4,960 kW)
- Speed: 16 knots (30 km/h; 18 mph)
- Range: 34,000 nautical miles (63,000 km) at 10 knots (19 km/h; 12 mph)
- Complement: 395 (incl. 18 officers), 5 prize-officers
- Armament: 6 × 15 cm (5.9 in) SK L/45 guns; 1 × 10.5 cm (4.1 in) SK L/45 guns; 2 × twin 3.7 cm (1.5 in) SK C/30 guns; 4 × twin 2 cm (0.79 in) FlaK 30 guns; 6 × 53.3 cm torpedo tubes (2 twins overwater, 2 mounted singles underwater); 1 x torpedo boat LS 4 Esau
- Aircraft carried: 2 Arado Ar 196 A-2

Michel (HSK-9) was an auxiliary cruiser of Nazi Germany's Kriegsmarine that operated as a merchant raider during World War II. Built by Danziger Werft in Danzig 1938/39 as the freighter Bielsko for the Polish Gdynia-America-Line (GAL), she was requisitioned by the Kriegsmarine at the outbreak of World War II and converted into the hospital ship Bonn. In the summer of 1941, she was converted into the auxiliary cruiser Michel, and was commissioned on 7 September 1941. Known as Schiff 28, her Royal Navy designation was Raider H. Michel was the last operative German raider of World War II.

== Construction and conversion ==
When the auxiliary cruiser Widder returned from her cruise to Germany, her engines were almost worn out. The hospital ship Bonn was converted into an auxiliary cruiser and mounted the weapons used by Widder.

== First raiding voyage ==
Although Michel was scheduled to leave at the end of November 1941, she was unable to sail until March 1942 because of reconstruction delays. She then moved under heavy escort through the English Channel to a port in occupied France. She set off on her cruise sailed on 20 March 1942, commanded by Fregattenkapitän (later Kapitän zur See) Helmuth von Ruckteschell, the former commander of Hilfskreuzer 3, the raider Widder).

Michel grounded on her first attempt to run through the English Channel and had to return to port. She managed to reach the Atlantic Ocean on 20 March on her second try. On 14 and 15 March, British forces attacked the cruiser and her escorts, but without success. Michel began her operations in the South Atlantic and sank the British tanker Patelle (7,469 gross register tons (GRT)) on 19 April. On 22 April her light motor torpedo boat, LS 4 Esau sank the American tanker Connecticut (8,684 GRT), but an attack on the faster British freighter Menelaus failed on 1 May. The Royal Navy now sent the heavy cruiser HMS Shropshire and two armed merchant cruisers (AMCs) to track her down. Nevertheless, Michel sank the Norse freighter Kattegat (4,245 GRT) on 20 May.

LS 4 Esau discovered the struggling US Liberty ship SS George Clymer (6,800 GRT) and scored two torpedo hits, though the freighter did not sink. The nearby British AMC Alcantara rescued her crew, but the ship had to be abandoned. The German ship retreated when the British AMCs came in sight and escaped detection. The British mistakenly presumed George Clymer had been torpedoed by a submarine. On 2 January 1943 she sank the British freighter Empire March in the southern Atlantic Ocean. Other successes followed as Michel crossed the South Atlantic and entered the Indian Ocean. After a successful cruise of eleven and a half months, she arrived in Japan in March 1943, having offloaded the rescued Allied sailors at Singapore. During her 346 days at sea, Michel had intercepted and sunk 15 Allied merchant ships, for a total of 98,586 GRT.

== Second raiding voyage ==
After a refit, Michel sailed from Yokohama on her second cruise on 21 May 1943, now under the command of KzS Günther Gumprich, who had previously commanded the raider Thor. She sailed along the west coast of Australia and crossed the Pacific Ocean to the coast of South America. Michel encountered and sank three allied ships over a five-month period, for a total of 27,632 GRT, before making her return to Japan.

The first prey of Michel was the 7,715 GRT Norwegian freighter Høegh Silverdawn, sunk south-east of Cocos Islands in the early hours of 15 June, whilst on a voyage from Fremantle, Australia, to Abadan, Iran, with ammunition and general cargo. A total of 30 crew and 6 passengers were killed. Three survivors were saved after 11 days on a raft. Another 14 survivors arrived in India after 32 days and 3,100 nautical miles (5,700 km; 3,600 mi) in a damaged lifeboat.

The second merchant ship to be sunk by Michel in her second voyage was also Norwegian, the 9,940 GRT tanker Ferncastle, which went down the same day that Høegh Silverdawn sank. The tanker was first torpedoed by Michel's midget motor torpedo boat LS4 Esau, and then shelled by the auxiliary cruiser. A total of 24 sailors died, 18 in the raider's attack and six others aboard one of the tanker's lifeboats before being rescued.

The fate of her last victim, the 9,977 GRT Norwegian tanker India, sunk in the southern Pacific on 11 September 1943 with a loss of all hands, would not be known until after the war's end. On 29 August, Michel's lookouts had sighted what they identified as a Pensacola-class cruiser. Gumprich ordered a northern course to avoid the powerful enemy warship. The log of the American light cruiser USS Trenton shows that she had a radar contact which lasted for 15 minutes on the previous day. Trenton was patrolling between 22°05′S 172°46′W and 20°16′S 174°56′W. Had the American cruiser investigated, the crew of India might have been saved.

== Fate ==
Almost within sight of Japan and only 50 miles (80 km) out from port, Michel was spotted by the US submarine Tarpon on 17 October 1943. In one of the few instances of American submarines attacking a German ship during World War II, Tarpon fired a total of eight torpedoes in four successive strikes, of which four torpedoes struck home and detonated - the Mark 14 torpedo having reliability problems. Michel sank, taking down 290 of her crew, including the captain. The 116 survivors reached safety in Japan after a three-day journey in open boats. Scores of others had been left on rafts and floating wreckage, but the Imperial Japanese Navy search aircraft reported they had seen nothing. This caused some friction with the German Navy officers in Japan, who felt the Japanese seemed unconcerned about rescuing possible German survivors. The loss of the Michel marked the end of the cruises of German auxiliary commerce raiders.

Some of the survivors were sent home with the German submarine UIT-23, which left Penang on 15 February 1944. Three days later the UIT-23 was torpedoed by the British submarine HMS Tally-Ho.

== Raiding career ==
First cruise:

- 1942-04-19 Patella 7,468 GRT
- 1942-04-22 Connecticut 8,684 GRT
- 1942-05-20 Kattegat 4,245 GRT
- 1942-06-07 George Clymer 7,176 GRT
- 1942-06-11 Lylepark 5,186 GRT
- 1942-07-15 Gloucester Castle 8,006 GRT
- 1942-07-16 William F Humphrey 7,893 GRT
- 1942-07-17 Aramis 7,984 GRT
- 1942-08-14 Arabistan 5,874 GRT
- 1942-09-10 MS American Leader 6,778 GRT
- 1942-09-11 Empire Dawn 7,241 GRT
- 1942-11-02 Reynolds 5,113 GRT
- 1942-11-29 Sawokla 5,882 GRT
- 1942-12-08 Eugenie Livanos 4,816 GRT
- 1943-01-02 Empire March 7,040 GRT

Second cruise:

- 1943-06-15 Høegh Silverdawn 7,715 GRT.
- 1943-06-17 Ferncastle 9,940 GRT
- 1943-09-11 India 9,977 GRT

== Bibliography ==
- Brennecke, Jochen (1996). Jäger-Gejagte. Deutsche U-Boote 1939-1945 (in German) (5th ed.). München: Wilhel Heyne Verlag. ISBN 3-453-02356-0.
- Erich Gröner. Die deutschen Kriegsschiffe 1815–1945 volume 3. Bonn: Bernard & Graefe Verlag. ISBN 3-7637-4802-4.
- Zvonimer Freivogel (2003). Deutsche Hilfskreuzer des Zweiten Weltkriegs. Stuttgart: Motorbuch Verlag. ISBN 3-613-02288-5.
- Paul Schmalenbach (1977). German Raiders 1895–1945. Patrick Stephens. ISBN 0-85059-351-4.
- August Karl Muggenthaler (1977). German Raiders of World War II. R. Hale. ISBN 0-7091-6683-4.
- Stephen Roskill (1954). The War at Sea 1939–1945 Volume I.
- Stephen Roskill (1956). The War at Sea 1939–1945 Volume II.
