= MV Empire Dawn =

Empire ship of World War II

History
- Name: Empire Dawn
- Owner: Ministry of War Transport
- Operator: W Runciman & Co Ltd
- Port of registry: Sunderland, United Kingdom
- Builder: William Doxford & Sons Ltd
- Yard number: 670
- Launched: 14 December 1940
- Completed: April 1941
- Out of service: 11 September 1942
- Identification: United Kingdom Official Number 168667; Code Letters BCGD
- Fate: Sunk by enemy action

General characteristics
- Type: Cargo ship
- Tonnage: 7,241 GRT; 5,066 NRT; 10,328 DWT
- Length: 442 ft 9 in (134.95 m) (overall); 428 ft 8 in (130.66 m) (between perpendiculars)
- Beam: 56 ft 5 in (17.20 m)
- Draught: 27 feet 4 3/4 inches (8.350 m)
- Depth: 35 ft 5 in (10.80 m)
- Installed power: 516 nhp 3-cylinder diesel engine
- Crew: 41

Location of the attack by Michel on Empire Dawn

Empire Dawn was a 7,241 GRT cargo ship that was built in 1940 by William Doxford & Sons Ltd, Sunderland, Co Durham, United Kingdom for the Ministry of War Transport (MoWT). Entering service in April 1941, she served until 11 September 1942 when she was sunk by the German raider Michel.

== Description ==
The ship was built in 1940 by William Doxford & Sons Ltd, Sunderland, Co Durham. She was yard number 670.

The ship was 442 feet 9 inches (134.95 m) long overall (428 feet 6 inches (130.61 m) between perpendiculars), with a beam of 56 feet 0 inches (17.07 m). She had a depth of 35 feet 0 inches (10.67 m) and a draught of 27 feet 4 3/4 inches (8.350 m). She was assessed at 7,241 GRT, 5,066 NRT. Her DWT was 10,328.

The ship was propelled by a 516 nhp diesel engine, which had three cylinders of 23 3/4 inches (60 cm) diameter by 91 1/16 inches (231.3 cm) stroke, driving a single screw propeller. The engine was built by William Doxford & Sons Ltd, Sunderland.

== History ==
=== 1941 ===
Empire Dawn was built for the MoWT. She was launched on 14 December 1940 and completed in 1941. She was placed under the management of W Runciman & Co Ltd. Her port of registry was Sunderland. The United Kingdom Official Number 168667 and Code Letters BCGD were allocated.

Empire Dawn sailed from Sunderland to the Tyne on 17 April 1941. Three days later, she joined Convoy EC 9, which had departed from Southend, Essex on 19 April and arrived at the Clyde on 25 April. She left the convoy at Loch Ewe on 23 April and sailed to Montreal, Quebec, Canada, arriving on 9 May. She departed from Montreal on 17 May for Halifax, arriving four days later. Empire Dawn was a member of Convoy HX 129, which departed from Halifax on 27 May and arrived at Liverpool, Lancashire on 12 June. She was carrying a cargo of grain. Empire Dawn left the convoy at Oban, Argyllshire on 12 June. Two days later, she joined Convoy WN 140, which arrived at Methil, Fife on 17 June. She then joined Convoy FS 518, which arrived at Southend on 19 June. She left the convoy at Spurn Head on 18 June and sailed to Hull, Yorkshire.

Empire Dawn joined Convoy FN 486 off Spurn Head on 29 June. The convoy had departed from Southend that day and arrived at Methil on 30 June. She departed from Methil on 17 July, joining Convoy EC 46, which had departed from Southend on 15 July and arrived at the Clyde on 20 July. She left the convoy at Oban on 19 July, departing two days later to join Convoy OG 69, which departed from Milford Haven, Pembrokeshire on 19 July and arrived at Gibraltar on 1 August. Her cargo was described as "stores". Over the next four months, Empire Dawn sailed to Cape Town, South Africa, Aden, Suez, Egypt, Mombasa, Kenya, Dar es Salaam, Tanganyika and Beira, Mozambique before arriving back at Cape Town on 14 November. She departed the next day for Freetown, Sierra Leone, where she joined Convoy SL 94, which departed on 30 November and arrived at Liverpool on 20 December. Her cargo consisted of copper, sisal and tobacco.

=== 1942 ===
Empire Dawn departed from Liverpool on 24 February 1942 for the Clyde, arriving the next day. She then joined Convoy ON 71, which departed from Liverpool on 26 February and arrived at dispersed at sea on 8 March. Again, her cargo was "stores". She arrived at Cape Town on 2 April. She departed Cape Town nine days later for Aden, arriving on 27 April and then departing two days later for Port Sudan, Sudan, where she arrived on 2 May. She departed from Port Sudan on 8 May for Suez, arriving on 11 May.

=== Sinking ===
Empire Dawn departed Suez on 14 August for Aden, arriving on 18 August and departing four days later for Durban, South Africa, where she arrived on 4 September. She departed the next day on what was to be her final voyage. She was in ballast, bound for Trinidad where she was to load bauxite and then sail to New York. On 11 September, Empire Dawn was attacked by the German raider Michel west of Cape Town, South Africa. Her position was 34°00′S 2°00′E. Although Empire Dawn indicated that she had surrendered, and the crew were abandoning ship, the shelling continued. She was sunk with the loss of 20 of her 41 crew. The survivors were rescued by Michel. They were transferred to Uckermark, and later Charlotte Schliemann which took them to Singapore, where they were handed over to the Japanese as prisoners of war. The continued shelling after the ship had surrendered was considered to be a war crime. Michel's captain Helmuth von Ruckteschell was found not guilty on this charge at his trial held at the Curio Haus in Hamburg, Allied-occupied Germany, from 5–21 May 1947. It was shown that the surrender was flashed in Morse Code by electric torch, the light from which was demonstrated in Court to be too weak to be seen in daylight and amongst the flashes of explosions. Von Ruckteschell was convicted on three other charges and sentenced to ten years' imprisonment, subsequently reduced to seven years. Von Ruckteschell died in prison on 24 June 1948. Those lost on Empire Dawn are commemorated on the Tower Hill Memorial in London.
