= Western Pipe and Steel Company =

American manufacturing company

Western Pipe & Steel
- Industry: Manufacturing & shipbuilding
- Founded: c. 1907
- Defunct: 1945
- Fate: Liquidated
- Successor: Consolidated Steel Corporation
- Headquarters: San Francisco, California, United States
- Products: Ships, iron and steel products
- Services: Ship repair

The Western Pipe and Steel Company (WPS) was an American manufacturing company that is best remembered today for its construction of ships for the Maritime Commission in World War II. It also built ships for the U.S. Shipping Board in World War I and took part in the construction of the giant Grand Coulee Dam project in the 1930s.

== Early history ==
The origins of the company are somewhat obscure. It appears it was organized in Los Angeles, California around 1907 by two brothers named Talbot and possibly a partner named T. A. Hays. Hays, a businessman with 21 years experience in the steel industry, was at some stage appointed Vice President of the new company, which in this period was a small-calibre steel pipe and metal casings manufacturer. An early President of the company was James A. Talbot, later to make and lose a fortune as the head of the Richfield Oil Company.

Western Pipe & Steel quickly began to expand its operations. In 1910 it established a factory in Taft, California for the supply of pipes and containers to the oil industry. Another factory was opened in Fresno in 1913. In 1915 a third new factory was established in Phoenix, Arizona to serve the agricultural and oil industries in that state.

The company made its first move into San Francisco in 1910 with the purchase of a local riveted pipe manufacturer, the Francis Smith Company, whose own origins dated back to 1854. Shortly thereafter, WPS purchased land in the Richmond District of San Francisco, and moved the Francis Smith plant to the new location.

== World War I ==
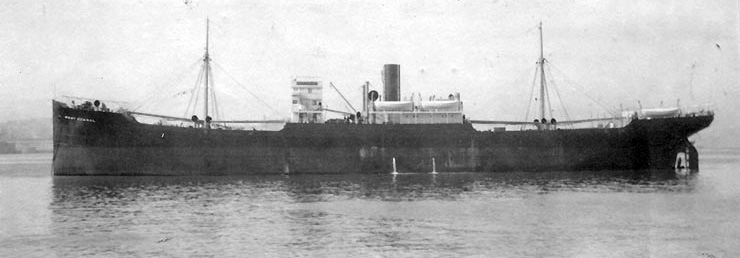
West Avenal, one of the ships built by Western Pipe & Steel for the US Shipping Board in WWI

In 1917 Western Pipe & Steel bought out another local San Francisco company, the Schaw Batcher Pipe Works. Schaw Batcher had frontage on San Francisco Bay and had just received a contract from the U.S. Shipping Board for the building of 22 merchant ships in accordance with the Board's strategic goal of developing a naval auxiliary and merchant marine fleet. With the purchase of Schaw Batcher, Western Pipe & Steel inherited these contracts, thus gaining its first foothold into the shipbuilding industry.

The Shipping Board's contract with WPS called for the building of eighteen vessels of about 5,650 tons each and four larger vessels of 8,800 gross tons. The larger vessels were eventually cancelled in 1918 but all eighteen of the smaller ships were completed, though few were built in time to see service in the war. All of the vessels were of riveted construction, in accordance with the available technology of the period. They had a length of 410 feet (120 m), a beam of 54 feet (16 m), a draft of 24 feet 2 inches (7.37 m), and a displacement of about 8000 tons. They ran on oil fuel and had a speed of 11 knots (20 km/h) and a crew of 39 to 45.

Because of the shortage of water frontage, the company dredged a large rectangular launching basin, and four shipping ways – two per side – were built, which launched ships sideways into the basin. The side launching method was not ideal for ships of this size and some of the vessels suffered hull damage on launch which then had to be repaired. The company was however, to persevere with side launching for the whole of its existence, and eventually these technical problems would be overcome. The channel and the four shipping ways were completed in only three months, and the keel of the company's very first ship, Isanti, was laid on 30 November 1917.

The first eight of the ships were fitted with General Electric steam turbines with a horsepower of 2500, but the plant proved unreliable and was subject to frequent breakdowns. Some of these vessels were lost at sea after foundering due to breakdown, and the rest were scrapped by 1930.

The remaining 10 vessels were fitted with triple expansion engines built by Joshua Hendy, a local San Franciscan company. The 2,800 horsepower (2,100 kW) Joshua Hendy plant proved much more reliable, and many of the vessels powered by this engine went on to have long careers (one of them in fact, the West Camargo, was to enjoy a remarkable service life of almost 60 years, finally being scrapped only in the late 1970s). While all of these vessels were originally built with World War I service in mind, none were lost in that conflict, but of the nine which survived to see service in World War II, more than half were sunk by enemy action.

=== Total production 1918–1920 ===
San Francisco shipyard
Ship type	No. Built	Delivery date		Displacement (tons)		
Ship type	No. Built	First	Last	Light	Full	Total
Cargo ship	18	10/18	10/20	5,650	8,000~	101,700

Source: Mawdsley, pp. 95–114.

== Between the wars ==
While many of America's First World War emergency shipyards shut down at the end of the war, Western Pipe & Steel continued to grow its business in the postwar era. The company closed its Richmond operation in 1921 and moved the plant located there to the San Francisco shipyard, which now began building barges and pipes. During this period the company is reported to have built self-propelled fuel, gasoline and water barges, and both self-propelled and non-self-propelled covered lighters. The exact number is not known, but the company's hull number sequence suggests that as many as 34 such vessels may have been completed in the interwar years.

In this period the company also began to extend its operations into other regions. The Fresno factory was expanded and in the 1930s new operations were set up in the San Francisco peninsula, and at Grand Coulee and Seattle, Washington.

=== Grand Coulee Dam ===
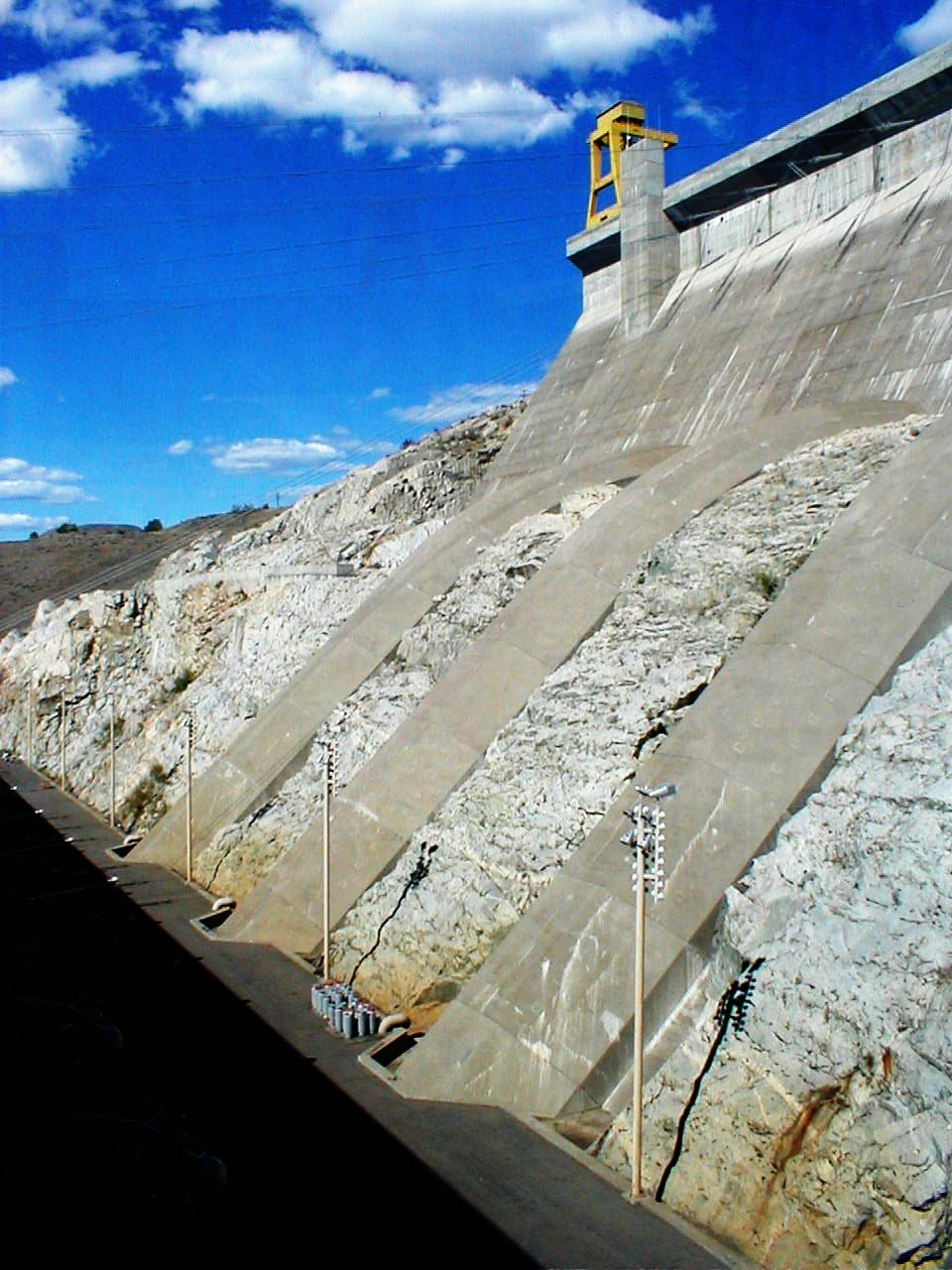
Penstocks at the Grand Coulee Dam's third powerhouse

Perhaps the biggest peacetime contract awarded to Western Pipe & Steel was for work on the Grand Coulee Dam project in the 1930s. Destined to become the biggest hydroelectric plant in the United States, this giant project was eventually to employ the services of 21 companies. Western Pipe & Steel was awarded the contract to build the dam's penstock and pump inlet pipes. These pipes were so large that they could not be transported to the site, and had to be manufactured onsite in a fabrication plant built expressly for the purpose.

The first 18 penstock pipes were each 290 feet (88 m) long and 18 feet (5.5 m) in diameter, while the remaining three had the same length but a 6-foot (1.8 m) diameter. The twelve pump-inlet pipes were each 14 feet (4.3 m) in diameter. Fabrication of the pipes required more than nine miles (14 km) of heavy welds, and the experience gained was to help make Western Pipe & Steel a world leader in the field of automated welding technology by the outbreak of World War II – expertise that would be put to good use after commencement of the company's wartime shipbuilding program.

=== Hetch Hetchy pipeline ===
Another major project undertaken by Western Pipe & Steel in the interwar years was for construction of the large calibre water transport pipes between the O'Shaughnessy Dam in the Hetch Hetchy Valley to the Crystal Springs Reservoir on the San Francisco Peninsula, and its subsequent extension from San Mateo to San Francisco. Today, the Dam supplies water to 2.4 million San Franciscans. The company also worked at this time on a pipeline for Everett, Washington.

== World War II ==
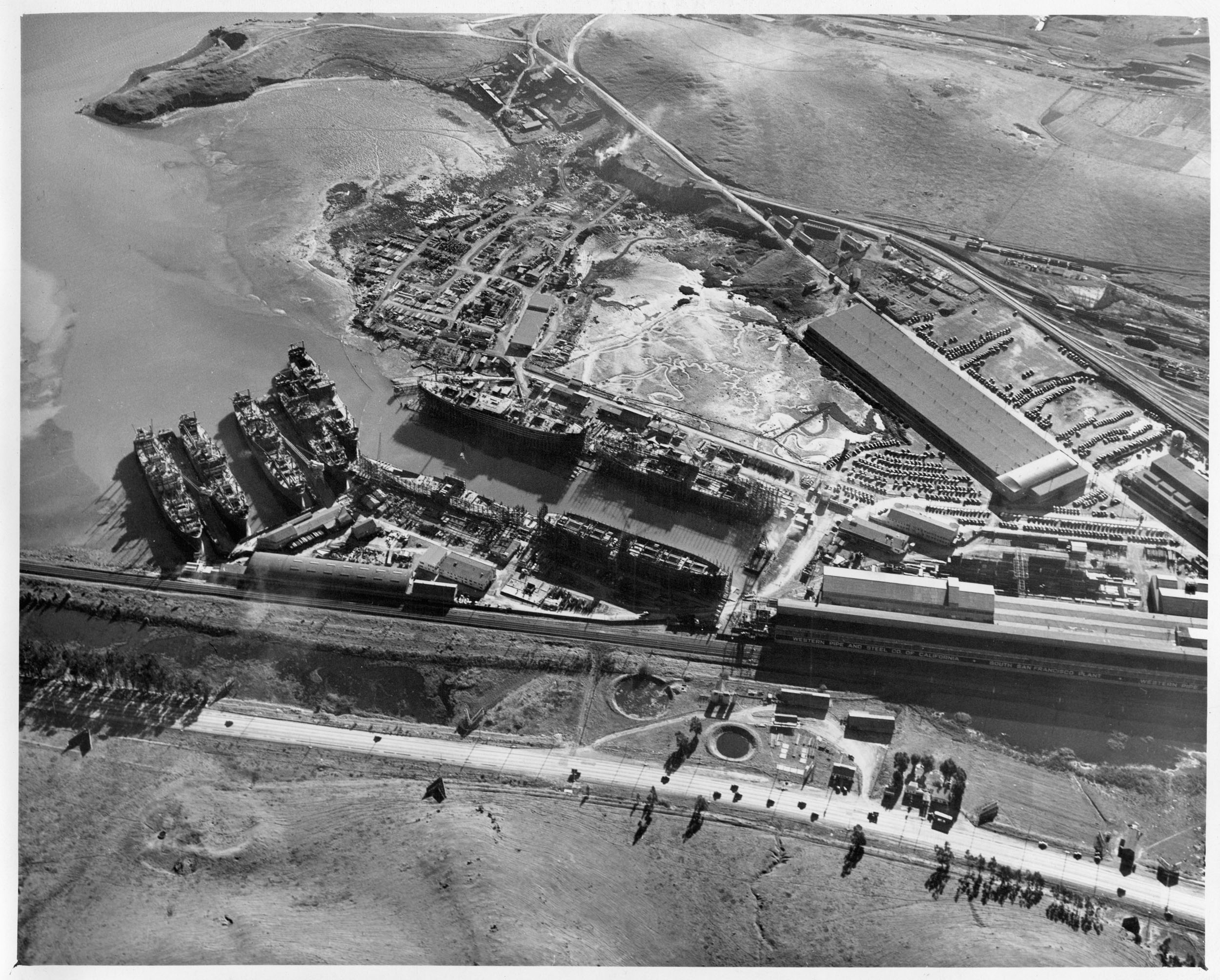
South San Francisco shipyard

In the late 1930s, the U.S. government set up the Maritime Commission, tasked with developing a scheme for replacing America's ageing merchant fleet with more modern vessels suitable for use as naval auxiliaries in the event of war. The commission introduced the Long Range Shipbuilding Program in 1937 which set a goal of producing 500 new merchant ships over a ten-year period.

When the commission began to offer public contracts for its shipbuilding program, the Western Pipe & Steel Company found itself in an advantageous position. To begin with, the company's president, H. G. Tallerday, served on the National Labor Relations Board and thus had contacts in the Roosevelt administration. Moreover, the company's years of experience with heavy welding in the 1930s now put it in the enviable position of being one of only three companies on the west coast with sufficient expertise to immediately begin building ships with all-welded hulls. The company ranked 89th among United States corporations in the value of World War II military production contracts.

The company's first bid – for the production of five C1 type cargo vessels – proved successful, and in October 1939 a $10 million contract was signed. Along with the contract came a government grant of $400,000 to help restore the company's old World War I California shipyard. Three months later, the first C1 keel – that of American Manufacturer – was laid on 5 February 1940.

After the initial 1939 order for the five C1s was completed, more Maritime Commission contracts followed, but the company was to build no more C1s. Instead, the San Francisco shipyard switched in 1940 to manufacture of the larger and faster C3 type, which had been expressly designed by the Maritime Commission with naval auxiliary service in mind. The C3s were to comprise the bulk of the company's manufacturing output in tonnage terms, with a total of 43 C3 hulls being produced by the company. Many of these hulls were not completed as standard C3 cargo vessels however, but were converted onsite (or at other yards) into naval auxiliaries, particularly escort carriers, attack transports and troopships.

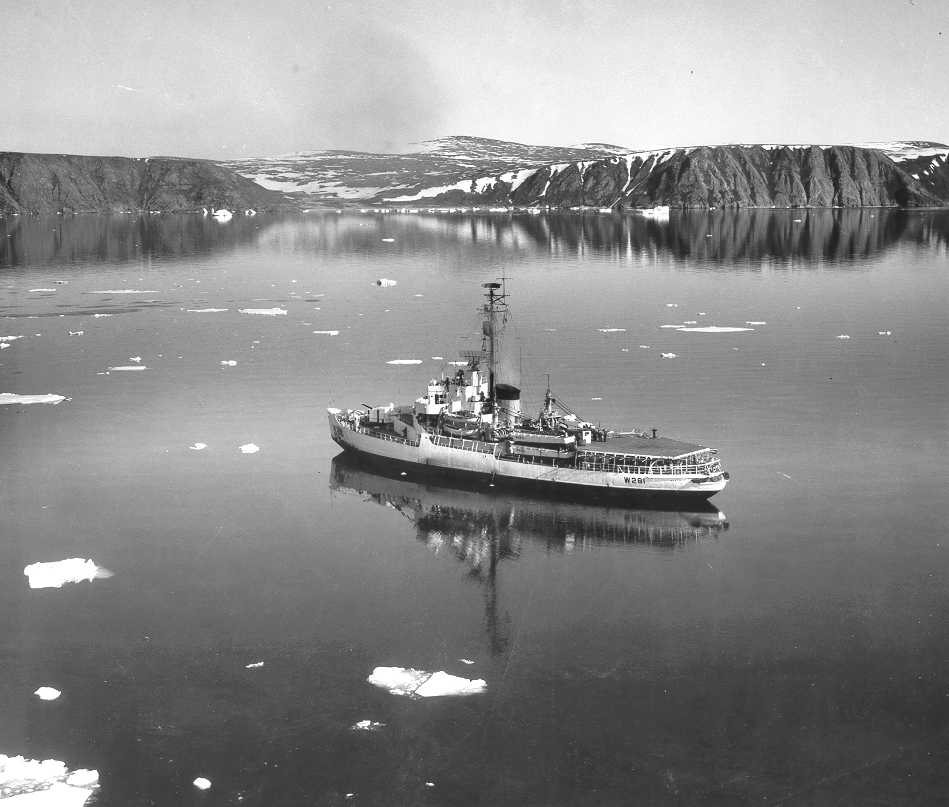
USCGC Westwind (WAGB-281), one of seven Wind class icebreakers built by Western Pipe & Steel

In 1941, the US Navy joined the Maritime Commission in contracting work from Western Pipe & Steel. A Navy grant of $7 million enabled the company to establish a second shipyard (33.76728°N 118.27859°W) with three building ways (later expanded to five) in the Port of Los Angeles West Basin, within spitting distance of the Consolidated Wilmington shipyard. As at the San Francisco yard, these ways were all of the side-launching type.

The most notable ships built at the San Pedro yard were the seven Wind class icebreakers, whose specifications were so imposing that Western Pipe & Steel was the only bidder. The yard also built a number of small warships including destroyer escorts, LSM's and Coast Guard cutters. In 1943, a number of the destroyer escorts were cancelled by the Navy in favor of the LSM's, which were a much-needed type at the time. The cutters by contrast were a low priority and most were only completed after the war.

=== Repair work ===
As the war progressed and the Allies began to achieve dominance, the need for new ships diminished and shipbuilding contracts began to wane. However, existing ships were suffering damage in combat and needed repair. Some required only minor repairs while others were badly damaged and needed extensive work. Western Pipe & Steel received its first contract for ship repair work in October 1944.

By August 1945 the company was able to report that a total of 118 ships had been repaired, with repairs taking an average of ten days per ship. But with the surrender of Japan in the same month, this work too came to an end.

=== Total production 1941–1947 ===
All shipbuilding contracts were signed during the war. A handful of ships that were still in the process of production upon the cessation of hostilities were completed in the immediate postwar period. This latter category included two icebreakers, five Type C3 cargo ships and eight high performance cutters.

In addition to the vessels listed below, the company also produced eleven 500-cubic-yard (380 m^{3}) dump scows for the US Navy during the war. These vessels were produced at the San Francisco shipyard and were for use at Midway Island in the Pacific.

San Francisco shipyard
Ship type	No. Built	Delivery date		Displacement (tons)		
Ship type	No. Built	First	Last	Light	Full	Total
Type C1 cargo ship	5	4/41	10/41	5,775	9,100	28,875
Bogue-class escort carrier	4	9/42	5/43	7,800	14,400	31,200
Destroyer tender (Cascade)	1	9/42	9/42	9,260	16,430	9,260
Seaplane tender (Chandeleur)	1	11/42	11/42	8,950	13,700	8,950
Troop transport	14	2/43	9/44	7,650	16,100	107,100
Bayfield class attack transport	14	3/43	12/44	8,100	16,100	113,400
Type C2 cargo ship	2	2/44	4/44	6,556	13,893	13,112
Type C3 cargo ship	9	1/45	8/46	7,650	16,100	68,850
Summary	50	4/41	8/46	7,768	15,134	380,747

San Pedro shipyard
Ship type	No. Built	Delivery date		Displacement (tons)		
Ship type	No. Built	First	Last	Light	Full	Total
Destroyer escort	12	10/43	9/44	1,240	1,620	14,880
Wind-class icebreaker	7	2/44	3/47	3,575	6,515	25,025
Landing Ship Medium (LSM)	32	8/44	2/45	520	900	16,120
Owasco-class cutter	11	5/45	9/46	1,342	1,978	14,762
Summary	61	10/43	3/47	1,160	1,880	70,787

Total production
Production Period	No. ships	Tonnage
World War II	96	395,398
Postwar	15	56,136
Total	111	451,534

Sources for this section: Maudsley pp. 115–179, Colton Company website, Hyperwar website, see References below.

== Postwar developments ==
With the dropping of the atomic bombs on Nagasaki and Hiroshima, the war ended abruptly and the amount of work available to shipyards across America rapidly declined. The glut of vessels produced by US shipyards during the war now led to a shakeup in the industry with many shipyards closing and others consolidating their operations.

=== The company ===
In late 1945, shortly after the war, the Western Pipe & Steel Company was sold for a sum in excess of $6.2 million to Consolidated Steel of California, which in turn sold the assets for $8.3 million to the Columbia Steel Company, a division of U.S. Steel, in 1948. Columbia Steel transferred the assets to a new division, Consolidated Western Steel, which was later merged into the parent company, U.S. Steel. Consolidated Western continued to manufacture pipes at facilities in Maywood, California, and South San Francisco, including the material used in a gas transmission pipeline which ruptured in San Bruno in 2010.

=== The shipyards ===
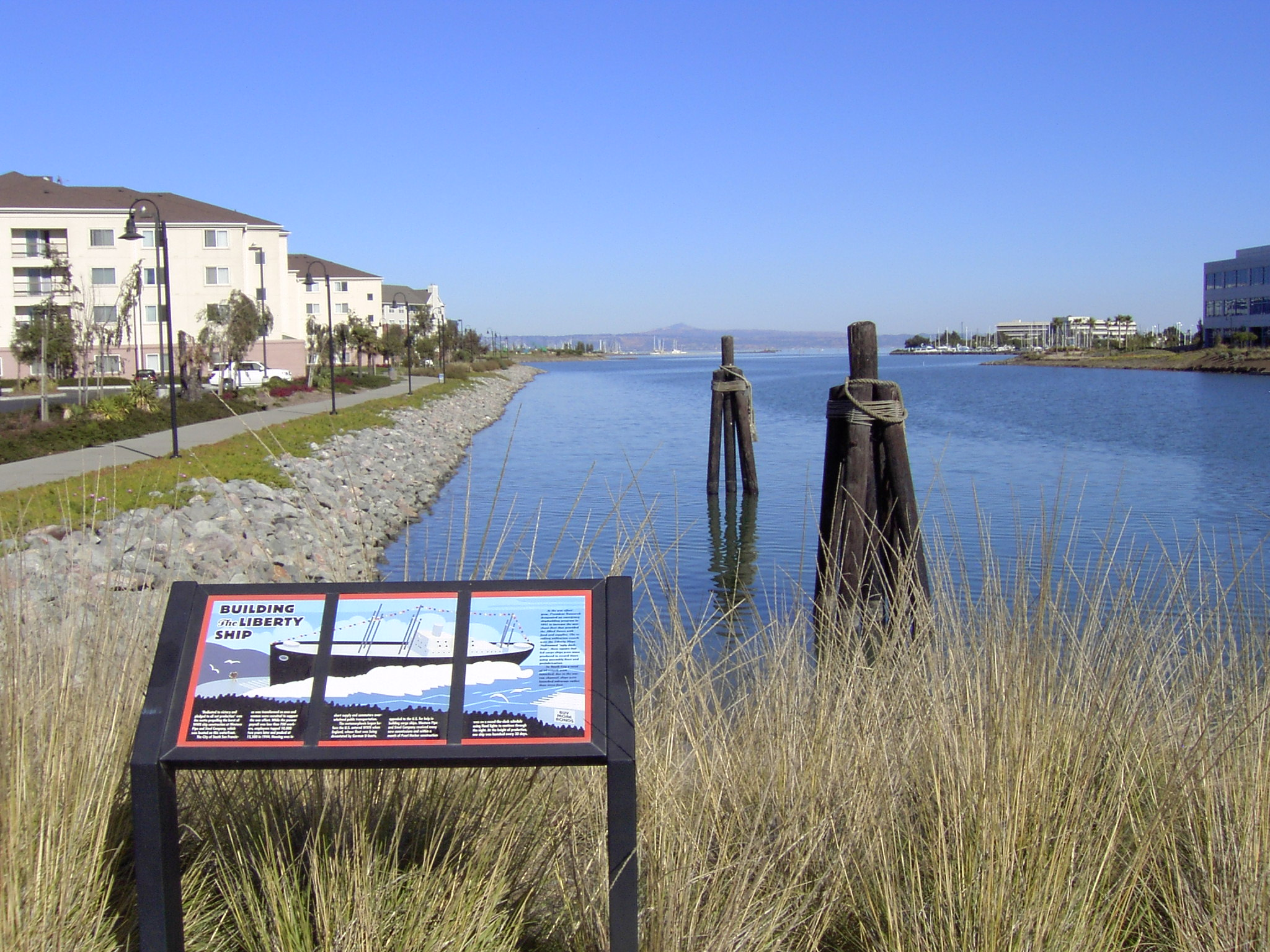
The San Francisco launching basin of Western Pipe & Steel as it looked in 2003

Little information is available concerning the fate of the San Pedro shipyard, except that it no longer exists.

In the years following the end of the war, various proposals for the revamping of the San Francisco shipyard came and went. In 1949, the Navy Bureau of Ships proposed the building of sixteen attack cargo ships (AKA) at the shipyard, but by 1952 it was decided these vessels would not be required. Instead the Navy proposed the building of several Landing Ships Dock (LSD), but a February 1953 survey concluded that the cost of modernizing the yard would probably be excessive.

In the early 1970s, the yard briefly came to life again when Howard Hughes' Summa Corporation began the construction of the Glomar Explorer and the large submersible barge HMB-1, as part of the top-secret Operation Jennifer whose purpose was the salvage of a Russian nuclear submarine which had sunk in the mid-Pacific. Many of the details concerning this operation are still secret.

In 1983, the site was sold to a commercial developer. Little evidence now remains of the shipyard which once existed there.

== Individual ships of note ==
Many of the ships built by Western Pipe & Steel were inevitably destined to relatively uneventful careers. Many of the Type C3 vessels, for example, played a modest role in the Second World War as troopships or transports and subsequently settled down to mundane postwar careers as cargo vessels. Others however had more unusual, more distinguished, or sometimes more tragic destinies. The following list includes a selection of these latter groups.

West Aleta

The WPS vessel with the shortest service history was West Aleta (WPS Hull No. 8). One of the vessels built by the company for the US Shipping Board in World War I, West Aleta was the last such ship to be fitted with the unreliable General Electric turbine motor.

Delivered in August 1919, she made her maiden commercial voyage the same month and was subsequently drydocked for repairs. A second voyage resulted in more repairs, this time to a cracked turbine. The following January she commenced a new voyage, and on 13 February was reported stranded in breakers northwest of Terschelling Island, the Netherlands. She subsequently broke up and was reported a total loss on 19 June 1920, having provided a mere six months of active service.

West Camargo

The WPS ship with the longest service life was probably West Camargo (WPS Hull No. 16), another vessel built under the US Shipping Board's World War I contract. Fitted with the much more reliable Joshua Hendy triple expansion engine, she was launched in 1920 and enjoyed an active service life as a commercial cargo vessel between the wars.

In 1942, the vessel was acquired by the US government and transferred to the USSR under lend-lease, where she was renamed Desna. After the war, Desna remained in service with the Soviet Union as a special cargo vessel for the transport of fish, a role she retained until 1978. In that year she was acquired by Japanese interests and subsequently sold for scrap, bringing to an end a remarkably long career of 58 years.

West Cadron

The worst peacetime disaster to befall a WPS ship occurred to West Cadron (WPS Hull No. 12). Launched in 1920, she was renamed the Iowa in 1928, and foundered and sank near Cape Disappointment at the mouth of the Columbia River (site of the notoriously treacherous Columbia Bar) on 12 January 1936, with the loss of all 34 crew.

American Leader

Another ill-fated crew was that of American Leader (WPS Hull No. 58), who were collectively to endure no less than three ship sinkings during the Second World War.

One of the five Type C1 vessels built by Western Pipe & Steel for its initial Maritime Commission contract, American Leader was delivered in July 1941 but only made a handful of voyages before being sunk by the German auxiliary cruiser Michel off the Cape of Good Hope in September 1942. Eleven crew members were killed in the engagement but the remaining 47 were rescued by Michel, who turned them over to the Japanese as prisoners of war.

In April 1944 eighteen survivors of American Leader were being transported on the Japanese hell ship Tamahoko Maru when the vessel was torpedoed and sunk by the submarine USS Tang. Only five of the eighteen former American Leader crewmen on board survived the attack. In September of the same year, five of another party of nine former crewmates were killed aboard the Japanese hell ship Junyo Maru when she was torpedoed and sunk by HMS Tradewind.

Other crewmembers died in Japanese captivity. Of the original 58-man crew of American Leader, only 28 returned home from the war.

West Kader

Another of the World War I-era WPS ships, West Kader (WPS Hull No. 11), found a niche in history as part of Britain's disastrous Convoy PQ 17 in 1942.

PQ 17 set out from Iceland for the Russian port of Arkhangelsk in June 1942. When the convoy commander was informed the German battleship Tirpitz was on course to intercept, he decided to split up the convoy with disastrous results. German U-boats and aircraft were able to easily pick off the isolated merchant vessels, sinking 25 of the convoy's 36 ships and putting PQ 17 into the history books as the greatest Russia-bound convoy loss of the war.

One of the victims of the debacle was West Kader, then operating under the name of Pan Kraft. Pan Kraft was disabled by bombing near-misses and forced to be abandoned, after which she exploded and sank. The PQ 17 disaster proved so costly that the British were subsequently compelled to totally revise their convoy strategy.

Warships

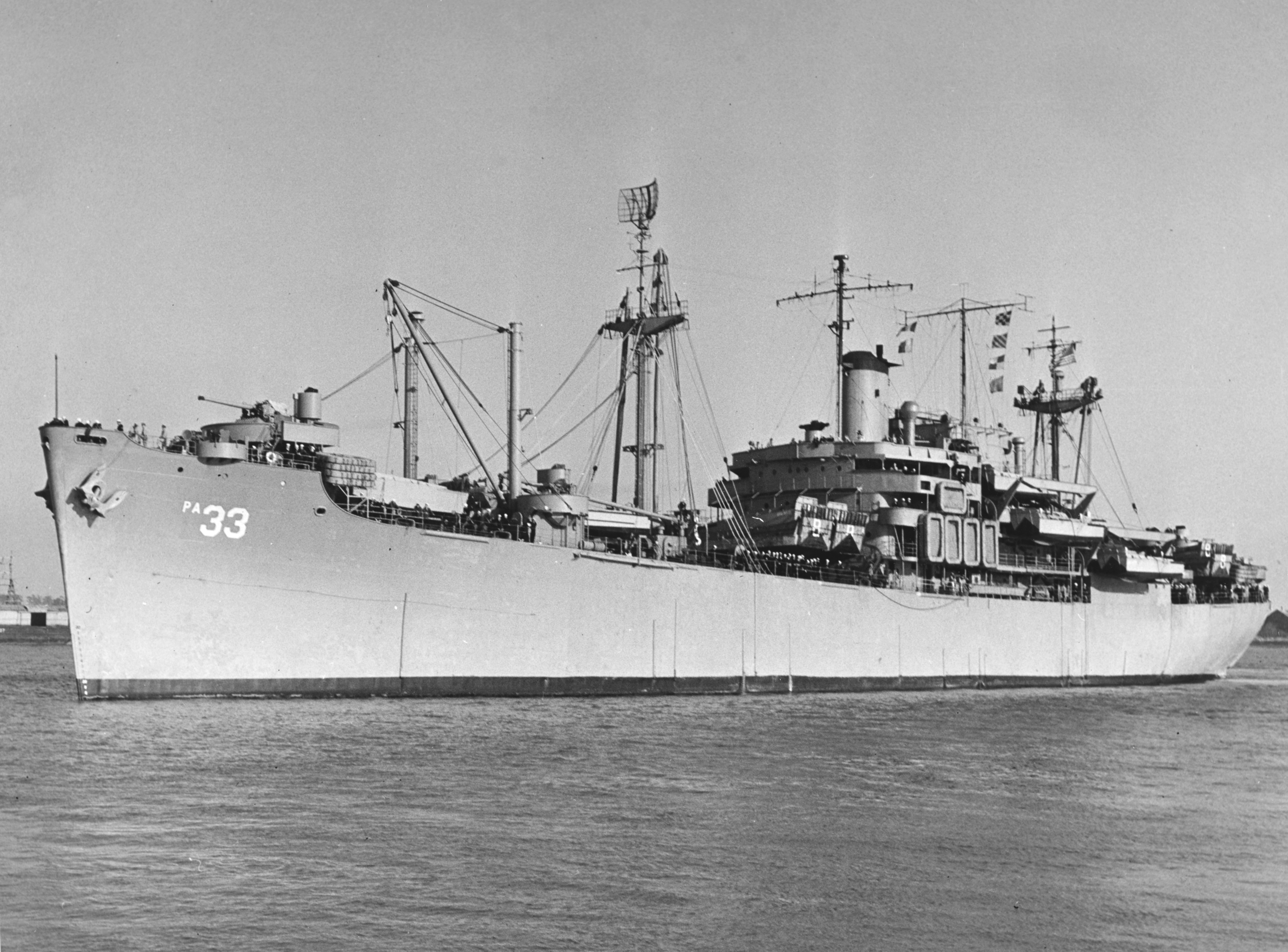
USS Bayfield (APA-33) at Charleston, South Carolina, 4 January 1950

A number of warships built by Western Pipe & Steel distinguished themselves in wartime service. Perhaps the most notable of these was the escort carrier HMS Fencer. One of the four escort carriers built by the company for service with the Royal Navy, Fencer was credited with the sinking of four German U-boats during the course of the war – U-666 on 10 February 1944, U-277 on 1 May, and U-674 and U-959 on the same day, 2 May 1944. Fencer also participated in Operation Tungsten, the successful attack on the German battleship Tirpitz in April 1944.

Some of the other warships built by Western Pipe & Steel which accumulated distinguished service records were USS Bangust, a destroyer escort which won eleven battle stars during World War II, USS Bayfield, an attack transport which received four battle stars in World War II, four in the Korean War and two in the Vietnam War, and HMS Stalker which received six battle honours for service with the Royal Navy in World War II.

Steel Artisan

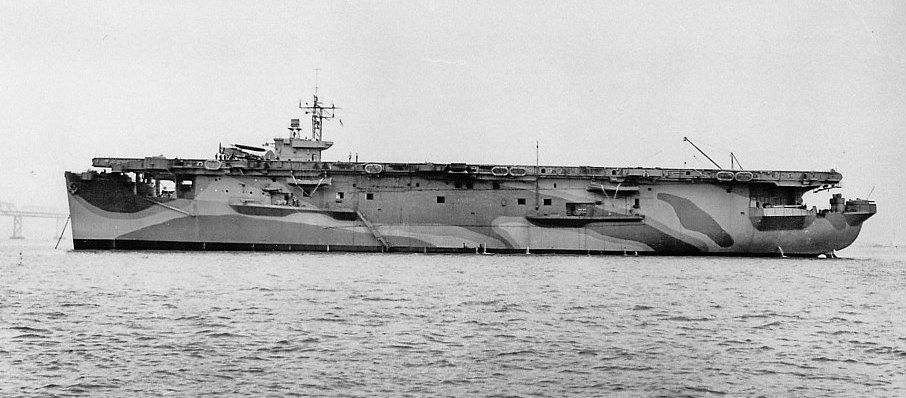
HMS Attacker (D02) at anchor in San Francisco Bay on 13 November 1942

The first Type C3 ship to be built by the company was the Steel Artisan (WPS Hull No. 62). Throughout its lifetime, Steel Artisan underwent two major conversions and served in three different roles.

Launched in September 1941 under Maritime Commission contract, Steel Artisan had almost been completed as a standard Type C3 cargo ship when word came through that she was to be converted into one of the newly designed Bogue class escort aircraft carriers. The conversion was subsequently carried out and Steel Artisan briefly became USS Barnes before being transferred under lend lease to the Royal Navy who dubbed her HMS Attacker.

Attacker was to serve with distinction during the war, taking part in the invasion of Salerno and subsequently of Southern France. In 1944 she was transferred to the Pacific where she was part of the fleet that witnessed the surrender of the Japanese in August 1945. Shortly thereafter, Attacker sailed into Singapore to take the surrender of the Japanese garrison there.

After the war, Attacker was decommissioned and returned to the United States, where her flight deck was removed. Laid up for some years, she was eventually bought by Russian entrepreneur Alexander Vlasov whose company the Sitmar Line undertook another major conversion of the vessel, this time into an ocean liner.

Renamed Fairsky the ship was assigned to the migrant passenger route between Britain and Australia in 1958, a role she retained until the early 1970s when Sitmar lost the migrant contract. Subsequently, she was operated by Sitmar as a popular cruise ship.

In 1977 the ship was damaged in a collision and sold to a Philippine consortium, who planned yet another major conversion for the vessel, into a casino ship named Philippine Tourist. The plans were dashed when the ship was tragically gutted by fire in 1978, after which the vessel was sold for scrap in 1980.

Sea Wren

Another WPS ship to undergo an interesting conversion was Sea Wren (WPS Hull No. 129). After serving during the war as attack transport USS Goodhue (during which time she sustained casualties and damage from a Japanese kamikaze attack), the ship returned after the war to cargo service with the San Francisco-based Matson Navigation Company, operating under the name Hawaiian Citizen.

In 1959, Hawaiian Citizen underwent a major conversion into a container ship, thus becoming the first all-containerized freighter operating on the West Coast of the United States. She was sold for scrap in 1981.

USS Cascade

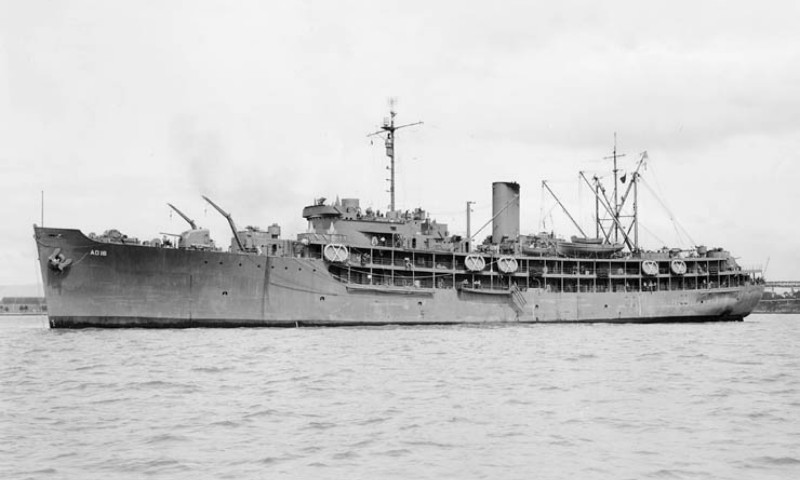
USS Cascade (AD-16)

One WPS ship, the destroyer tender USS Cascade (WPS Hull No. 63), has a minor connection with American literature and the Hollywood film industry. During the Second World War, Typhoon Cobra devastated an American fleet in the Pacific led by Admiral William Halsey, Jr., killing 793 men and sinking three of the fleet's destroyers. In the aftermath, an inquiry chaired by Halsey heard allegations that the captain of one of the destroyers that sank, USS Hull, had been negligent in his command. The inquiry was held on board Cascade.

American novelist Herman Wouk later used this inquiry as the inspiration for his 1952 Pulitzer Prize winning fictional work The Caine Mutiny. The book was later turned into an Oscar-nominated film starring Humphrey Bogart.

== See also ==
- California during World War II
- Maritime history of California
