= Lyndon Spencer =

Lyndon Spencer (January 26, 1898 – April 12, 1981) was a Vice Admiral in the United States Coast Guard.

== Career ==
Spencer graduated from the United States Coast Guard Academy in 1918. His early assignments included serving aboard the USCGC Tampa.

From 1922 to 1925, he served on the staff at the Coast Guard Academy. Later, he became executive officer of the USS Cummings (DD-44). He remained there until he took over command of the USS Monaghan (DD-32) in 1926. Later, he would command the USS Abel P. Upshur (DD-193) and USCGC Ingham (WHEC-35).

During World War II, Spencer commanded the USS Bayfield (APA-33). While in command, the Bayfield served as the flagship of the Naval Task Force during Operation Overlord. For his services during this time, Spencer was awarded the Legion of Merit and the Croix de Guerre of France.

Later in his career Spencer served as the president of the Lake Carriers' Association, an organization tasked with representing the interests of U.S.-flag vessel operators on the Great Lakes.
