= Druffel =

Druffel is a surname. Notable people with the surname include:

- August von Druffel (1841–1891), German historian
- Ellen R.M. Druffel (born 1953), American oceanographer and isotope geochemist
- John H. Druffel (1886–1967), American judge
- Larry Druffel (born 1940), American engineer
