= Albrecht Brandi =

German navy officer and world war II U-boat commander

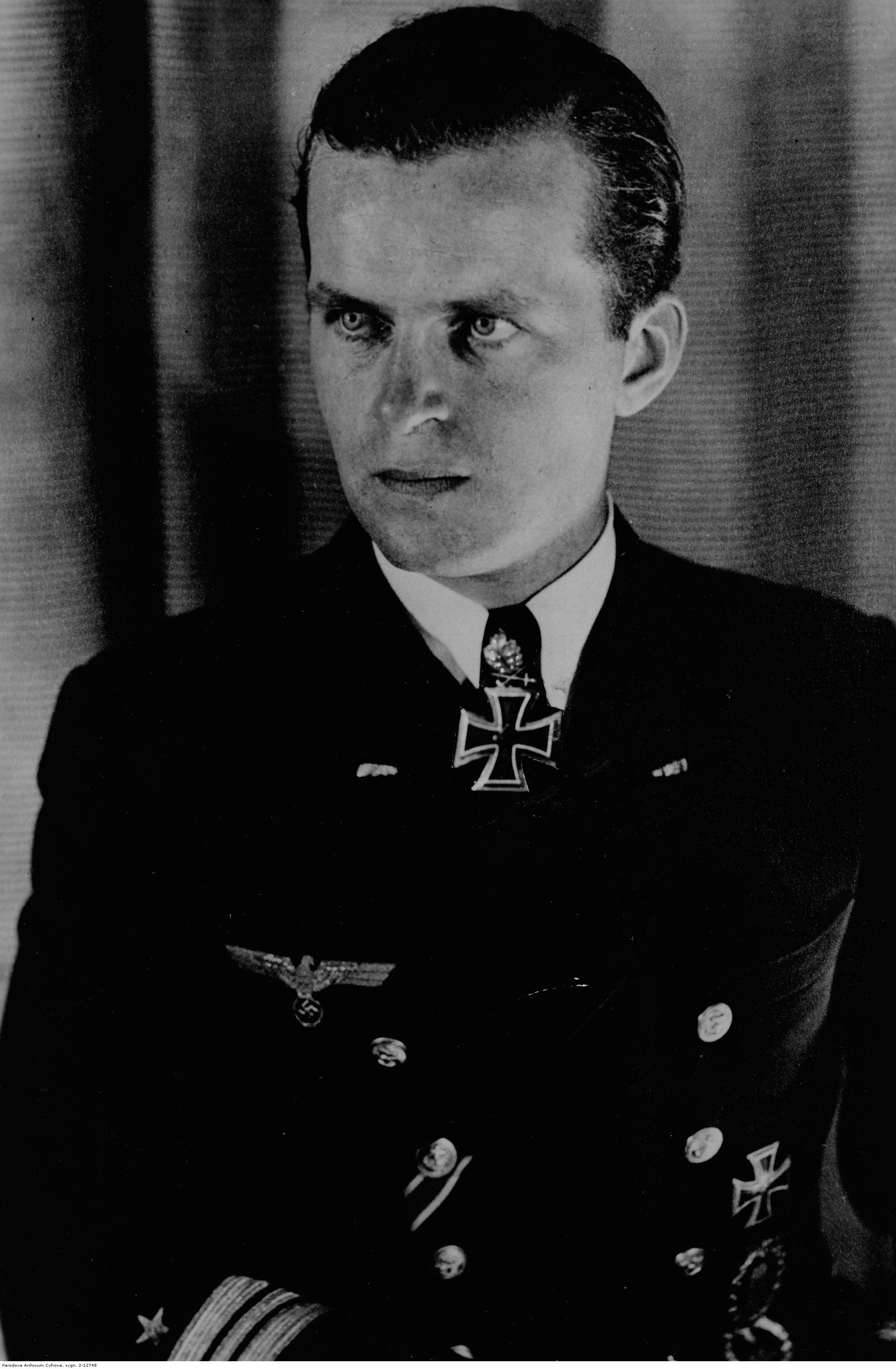
- Born: 20 June 1914; Dortmund, German Empire
- Died: 6 January 1966 (aged 51); Cologne, West Germany
- Burial place: Hauptfriedhof Dortmund (Plot A23/92–99)
- Relatives: Ernst Brandi (father); Karl Brandi (uncle); Sabine Brandi (daughter)
- Military career
- Allegiance: Nazi Germany
- Branch: Kriegsmarine
- Service years: 1935–1945
- Rank: Fregattenkapitän
- Units: SSS Gorch Fock; Light cruiser Karlsruhe; 1st Minesweeper Flotilla; 5th U-boat Flotilla; 7th U-boat Flotilla; 29th U-boat Flotilla
- Commands: M-1 (May 1940 – April 1941); U-617 (April 1942 – September 1943) U-380 (December 1943 – March 1944) U-967 (April 1944 – July 1944)
- Conflicts: See battles World War II: Invasion of Poland; Operation Weserübung; Battle of the Atlantic; Mediterranean U-boat Campaign
- Awards: Knight's Cross of the Iron Cross with Oak Leaves, Swords and Diamonds
- Other work: Architect

Albrecht Brandi (20 June 1914 – 6 January 1966) was a German U-boat commander in Nazi Germany's Kriegsmarine during World War II. Together with Wolfgang Lüth, he was the only Kriegsmarine sailor who was awarded with the Knight's Cross of the Iron Cross with Oak Leaves, Swords and Diamonds. The Knight's Cross (German: Ritterkreuz), and its variants were the highest awards in the military and paramilitary forces of Nazi Germany during World War II. Brandi is credited with the sinking of eight merchant ships for a total of 25,879 gross register tons (GRT), one auxiliary warship of 810 GRT, and three warships of 5,000 long tons (5,100 tonnes).

Brandi, the son of the industrial-manager Ernst Brandi, was born in Dortmund, Germany and grew up in the Weimar Republic. After the rise of the Third Reich in 1933, he joined the navy in 1935. Following service on minesweepers, Brandi began his U-boat career in April 1941. He first served as a commander-in-training on U-552, which was commanded by Erich Topp, before taking command of U-617 in April 1942 on seven war patrols, all but one in the Mediterranean theater of operations. On 12 September 1943, U-617 came under aerial attack off the Moroccan coast. U-617 was severely damaged forcing Brandi to beach the boat. The crew abandoned ship and were interned by Spanish forces. Brandi escaped internment and returned to Germany, where he was given command of U-380 which he took on one patrol before the submarine was destroyed in an aerial attack while at port in Toulon. He was then given command of U-967. After one patrol, Brandi was appointed chief of U-boat operations in the eastern Baltic Sea. In January 1945, Brandi was placed in charge of the Marinekleinkampfverbände (small naval battle units) in the Netherlands where he surrendered to Canadian forces at the end of the war.

Following his release from captivity in September 1945, Brandi became a bricklayer and then studied architecture. For three years he served as chairman of the Association of German Architects. Brandi fell ill and died suddenly on 6 January 1966 at a hospital in Cologne and was buried with military honors in Dortmund.

== Early life and career ==
Brandi was born on 20 June 1914 in Dortmund at the time in the Province of Westphalia, a province of the Kingdom of Prussia. He was the sixth and youngest child of Ernst Brandi, a mining director and board member of the Vereinigte Stahlwerke (United Steelworks), and his wife Clara, née Jucho. Following graduation with his Abitur (university-preparatory high school diploma) from a Gymnasium, he joined the Reichsmarine on 1 April 1935 as a member of "Crew 35" (the incoming class of 1935). (Note: The German Reichsmarine was renamed to Kriegsmarine on 1 June 1935.)

He received his military basic training in the 2nd company in the 2nd department of the standing ship division of the Baltic Sea in Stralsund. (Note: 2nd company—2. Kompanie) (Note: 2nd department—II. Abteilung) (Note: standing ship division—Schiffsstammdivision) He was then transferred to the school ship Gorch Fock attaining the rank of Seekadett (midshipman) on 25 September 1935. Following his promotion he was posted to the light cruiser Karlsruhe (26 September 1935 – 19 June 1936). Brandi sailed on Karlsruhe's fifth training cruise, which started on 21 October 1935 in Kiel and ended on 13 June 1936. The journey took him and her crew to Tenerife, São Tomé, Lobito, Durban, Port Victoria on the Seychelles, Batavia present-day Jakarta, Iloilo City on the Philippines, Hong Kong, various Japanese ports, Dutch Harbor on the Aleutian Islands, San Diego, through the Panama Canal and via Saint Thomas and Pontevedra back to Kiel.

Following his journey on Karlsruhe, Brandi attended the main cadet course at the Naval Academy Mürwik (20 June 1936 – 31 March 1937). (Note: main cadet course—Hauptlehrgang für Fähnriche) During this time frame at the naval academy he advanced in rank to Fähnrich zur See (officer cadet) on 1 July 1936. Starting on 1 April, he underwent a number of specialized weapons training courses for cadets at Mürwik. (Note: weapons course for cadets—Waffenlehrgang für Fähnriche) Brandi was then transferred to the minesweeper M-125, serving as third watch officer. On 2 October 1937, he then transferred to the minesweeper M-1, under the command of Kapitänleutnant (Captain Lieutenant) Hans Bartels, in the 1. Minensuchflottille (1st Minesweeper Flotilla), again holding the position of a watch officer. On this assignment he was promoted to Oberfähnrich zur See (Senior Ensign) on 1 January 1938 and to Leutnant zur See (Second Lieutenant) on 1 April 1938.

== World War II ==
At the outbreak of World War II, Brandi continued to serve on minesweeper M-1 under Bartels. M-1 transported the Marinestosstruppkompanie, a reinforced naval infantry platoon, to the battleship Schleswig-Holstein prior to the attack of the Polish base at Danzig's Westerplatte in the early morning hours of 1 September 1939. On 1 October 1939, he was promoted to Oberleutnant zur See (First Lieutenant). Following the Invasion of Poland, M-1 undertook various minefield clearing operations in the North and Baltic Sea. On 24 February 1940, without prior warning, M-1 rammed and sank four Esbjerg based Danish trawlers, Ejjam (E 92), Gerlis (E 456), Mercator (E 348) and Polaris (E 504) in the vicinity of the Dogger Bank. Bartels reported to his superiors that no one was rescued due to "military reasons"; 16 fishermen from the then neutral Denmark lost their lives. In April 1940 on M-1, Brandi participated in Operation Weserübung, Germany's assault on Denmark and Norway, and was awarded both classes of the Iron Cross (Eisernes Kreuz).

On 25 May 1940, Brandi was appointed commander of M-1. In this command position, Brandi came into contact with the U-boat arm, providing escort duty to U-boats leaving and returning to port. He applied for service with U-boat arm but was rejected at first. In April 1941, Brandi applied again, was accepted and started his U-boat training at the Naval Academy Mürwik which he completed on 24 December 1941 at Neustadt in Holstein. On 25 December 1941, Brandi became a Kommandantenschüler (Commander-in-training) aboard U-552, which was commanded by Kapitänleutnant Erich Topp, for one war patrol (25 December 1941 – 27 January 1942). On this patrol before the coast of Newfoundland, U-552 sank three ships, the British Dayrose on 15 January, the US Frances Salman and the Greek Maro on 18 January. On 28 January 1942, Brandi was stationed at the Blohm & Voss shipyard in Hamburg, for familiarization with U-617, a Type VIIC U-boat. On 9 April 1942, Brandi commissioned U-617 in Kiel and completed various trainings with this boat in the 5th U-boat Flotilla.

=== First patrol, Wolfpack Pfeil ===
For his first patrol (29 August – 7 October 1942), Brandi left Kiel in August 1942, operating in the Western Approaches before arriving at St. Nazaire, France in October. There U-617 was subordinated to the 7th U-boat Flotilla. On this patrol, Brandi claimed four merchant ships sunk. On 7 September, Brandi sank his first ship, the Faroes trawler Tor II. U-617 was then part of Wolfpack Pfeil, which also included U-216, U-221, U-258, U-356, U-595, U-607 and U-615, and operated against Convoy SC 100. On the night 22/23 September, Brandi sank one ship, the tanker Athelsultan, and on the following day two stragglers for 14,787 gross register tons (GRT). One of the stragglers sunk by Brandi on 23 September was the formerly Danish steamer Tennessee. The other straggler, the Belgian steamer Roumanie, was sunk at 13:58 on 24 September, killing the master, 35 crewmen and 6 gunners; only the chief engineer survived. Brandi rescued the chief engineer in violation of the Laconia Order issued by Großadmiral (German Grand Admiral) Karl Dönitz. On 26 September, Brandi sighted Convoy ON 131, his attack failed due to torpedo malfunctions. On this patrol, Brandi was promoted to Kapitänleutnant on 1 October 1942. After this patrol, on 8 October 1942, he received the U-boat War Badge (U-Boot-Kriegsabzeichen).

=== Second patrol, war in the Mediterranean Sea ===
On his second patrol (2–28 November 1942), Brandi was ordered to the Mediterranean Sea where he was placed under the command of the 29th U-boat Flotilla. His mission in the Mediterranean theater of operations was to help secure the supply routes for the Afrikakorps in North Africa. To get to his destination Brandi had to traverse the heavily guarded Strait of Gibraltar. Brandi made the passage on 8 November 1942 submerged. Nevertheless, U-617 was discovered by a British Short Sunderland bomber which dropped two depth charges, but missed. That day, British-American forces invaded French North Africa in Operation Torch (8–16 November 1942). At 11:27 on 21 November, Brandi attacked a strong British naval task force, firing a spread of four torpedoes at distance. Following the assault, U-617 came under attack. Over four hours, 80 depth charges were dropped on U-617. At 16:00 on 23 November, Brandi unsuccessfully attacked a cruiser before arriving in La Spezia on 28 November 1942. Although no ships were actually sunk that day, the Führer der Unterseeboote Italy (FdU—Leader of U-boat Operations) later credited Brandi with the sinking of one cruiser of French or American origin, and one destroyer. Additionally the FdU acknowledged that Brandi had torpedoed two freighters, their sinking was assumed. The FdU denied him credit for having severely damaged a battleship.

=== Third patrol, Knight's Cross ===
On his third patrol (21 December 1942 – 17 January 1943) before the coast of Cyrenaica, in December 1942, Brandi sank the ocean tug HMS St. Issey (W25), and two merchant ships, Annitsa and Harboe Jensen on 15 January 1943. Following this patrol which ended in Salamis, the FdU credited Brandi with the destruction of one destroyer, one tug of 1,000 GRT and one lighter of unknown tonnage, all three sunk on 28 December 1942. The FdU further acknowledged the sinking of three ships on 30 December of 22,000 GRT, two ships on 13 January 1943 of 5,000 GRT, and two more ships on 15 January of 13,000 GRT. The Befehlshaber der U-Boote (BdU—U-boats Commander-in-Chief) confirmed this assessment and credited Brandi with the sinking of eight ships totalling 41,000 GRT and one destroyer. For this achievement, Brandi was awarded the Knight's Cross of the Iron Cross (Ritterkreuz des Eisernen Kreuzes) on 21 January 1943. The presentation was made by the commanding Admiral Aegean Sea, Vizeadmiral (Vice Admiral) Erich Förste, in La Spezia.

=== Fourth patrol ===
During his fourth patrol (27 January – 13 February 1943) which started at the Salamis Naval Base and ended in Pula, Brandi sank the British minelayer HMS Welshman a few miles from the Maltese coast on 1 February 1943. Welshman, together with the minelayer HMS Abdiel and the mine-laying submarine HMS Rorqual, had been operating against the Axis supply route between the Gulf of Tunis and Sicily. In addition, Brandi also claimed to have sunk four ships from two convoys for a total of 10,800 GRT. Verifiable were the destruction of the Norwegian freighter Corona and Henrik, both sunk on 5 February 1943 from Convoy AW 22.

=== Fifth patrol, Oak Leaves ===
In April 1943, on his fifth patrol (25 March – 17 April 1943), Brandi claimed the sinking of a light cruiser, 40 nautical miles (74 km; 46 mi) off Gibraltar. The FdU credited him with the sinking of a Fiji-class cruiser, a Tribal-class destroyer on 10 April and a troop transport type Orcades of 23,456 GRT attacked on 13 April. On this patrol, Brandi was awarded Knight's Cross of the Iron Cross with Oak Leaves (Ritterkreuz des Eisernen Kreuzes mit Eichenlaub) on 11 April 1943, the 224th officer or soldier of the Wehrmacht so honored. The presentation was made by Großadmiral Dönitz at the Wolf's Lair, Adolf Hitler's headquarters in Rastenburg.

=== Sixth patrol ===
In June 1943, on his sixth patrol (31 May – 20 July 1943), a roundtrip from Toulon, with the objective to engage enemy shipping east of Gibraltar before the Algerian coast. On this patrol, the FdU credited Brandi with the unverifiable destruction of an H-class destroyer.

=== Seventh patrol, loss of U-617 ===
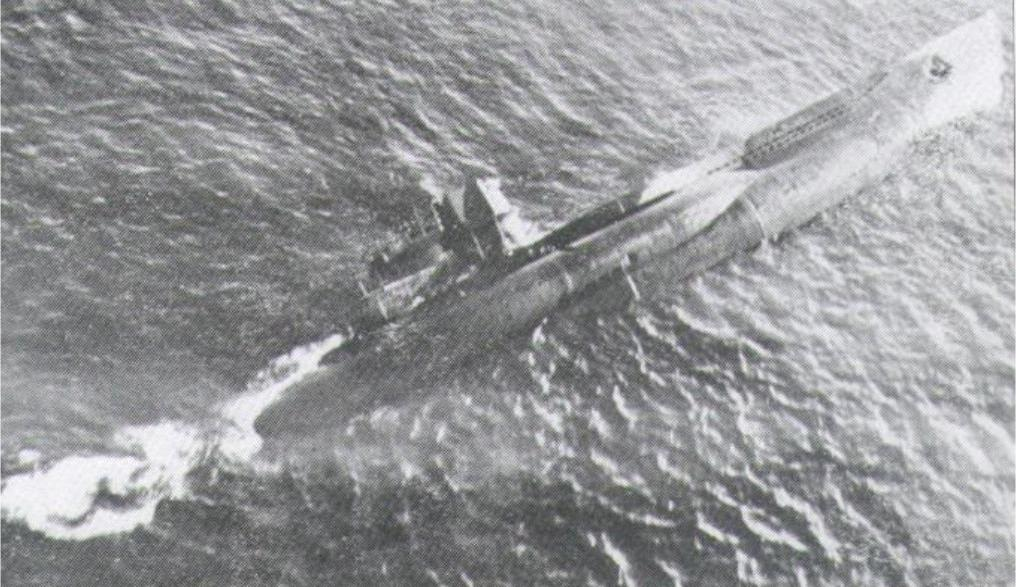
U-617 aground near Mellila, Morocco after British air attack 12 September 1943.

In September 1943, in his last patrol in U-617, Brandi sank HMS Puckeridge, a Hunt-class destroyer, off Gibraltar. A few days later, on the night of 10 September, he was attacked near the Moroccan coast by Royal Air Force Wellington aircraft from No. 179 Squadron piloted by Squadron Leader D. B. Hodgkinson in position 35°38′N 03°27′W damaging U-617. Three hours later, on 11 September, another No. 179 Squadron aircraft piloted by Pilot Officer W. H. Brunini dropped more depth charges. The resultant damage to U-617 was so severe that Brandi could no longer risk diving. To avoid capture, Brandi decided to sail U-617 to shallow waters and abandoned ship off Melilla, Spanish Morocco, in position 35°13′N 03°21′W. After evacuating into rubber boats, the crew managed to reach the shore without loss and were interned by Spanish troops. Brandi was loosely confined in the officers' camp near Cádiz. With the help of the German naval attaché in Madrid, he received a fake passport with the cover name "Albert Bergmann" and from there returned to Germany. The wrecked U-617, aground offshore, was finally destroyed and sunk by air attack from Lockheed Hudson bombers from No. 48 and No. 233 Squadron and naval gunfire from HMS Hyacinth and HMAS Wollongong.

=== Patrols on U-380 and U-967, Swords ===
On 19 November 1943, Brandi returned to Toulon and took command of U-380 from Kapitänleutnant Josef Röther. U-380 was damaged in an aerial attack on 24 November. Three waves of over 100 Boeing B-17 Flying Fortress bombers had targeted the U-boat base at the military port of Toulon. The pressure hull was punctured in three places, requiring extended repairs. On 11 December, Brandi began with first test runs before torpedoes and provisions were stored on 18/19 December. Brandi completed one patrol (20 December 1943 – 21 January 1944) with U-380, it was U-380's tenth and last patrol before the boat was destroyed on 11 March 1944 in Toulon by a bombing raid of the United States Army Air Forces (USAAF) Ninth Air Force. On 24 December, Brandi attacked what he identified as a H-class destroyer. Röll and Besler state that this destroyer may have been the French destroyer Le Fantasque.

On his return to Toulon on 21 January, Brandi, due to a navigational error of 45 nautical miles (83 km; 52 mi), ran U-380 aground. Two tugboats called in from Toulon had to pull U-380 free again. Kapitän zur See (Captain at See) Werner Hartmann, the new FdU Mediterranean Sea, evaluated Brandi's performance and severely criticized him for his bad performance on this patrol. In particular his report stated that Brandi failed to maintain a proper war diary, which makes it difficult to assess Brandi's decisions. He went on that Brandi's attacks were carried out to passively, avoiding contact with the enemy, apparently diving away too early. Hartmann concluded that U-380's running aground was caused by "sloppy" navigation. Nevertheless, both the FdU and BdU credited Brandi with torpedoing one destroyer on 23 December and probably having sunk another destroyer on 11 January.

On 22 January 1944, U-380 was taken to the shipyard at Missiessy for a major overhaul of the boat. An attack carried out by the 15th USAAF on 4 February damaged U-380, extending its planned maintenance time. U-380 was ready again for sea trials on 8 March. On 11 March, fully equipped and ready again for its next war patrol, it was moored just outside of Missiessy. At 12:00, Toulon came under attack of 120 Consolidated B-24 Liberators of the 47th Bombardment Wing of the Ninth Air Force. U-380 took a direct hit, killing the Dieselmaat Jonny Christof and two shipyard employees.

In April 1944 Brandi became commander of U-967. During his first and only patrol (11 April – 17 May 1944) with her in May 1944 Brandi, operating against convoy GUS 38, sank the destroyer USS Fechteler on the night of 4/5 May 1944 with a T-5 acoustic torpedo. Two further attacks with acoustic torpedoes on 26 April and 8 May were unsuccessful. Brandi also made a number of claims for sinking ships that cannot be substantiated. Following this he received the Knight's Cross of the Iron Cross with Oak Leaves and Swords (Ritterkreuz des Eisernen Kreuzes mit Eichenlaub und Schwertern) on 9 May 1944. Brandi was the 66th member of the Wehrmacht and last sailor of the Kriegsmarine who received this award. The presentation was made by Hitler at the Berghof in the Obersalzberg of the Bavarian Alps near Berchtesgaden on 20 May 1944.

=== Ashore ===
Brandi had to surrender command of U-967 because he had fallen seriously ill with tonsillitis on his last patrol. On 8 June 1944, he was promoted to Korvettenkapitän (Corvette Captain), backdated to 9 May 1944. In July 1944, Brandi was then appointed U-Admiralstabsoffizier (Asto—officer of the admiralty staff) commander of all U-boat operations in the Gulf of Finland with commanding admiral of the eastern Baltic Sea in Helsinki, (Note: commanding admiral of the eastern Baltic Sea—Kommandierender Admiral östliche Ostsee) under the command of Admiral Theodor Burchardi. Following the loss of the German naval bases in Finland, the German U-boats operated from Danzig, present-day Gdańsk, and Gotenhafen, present-day Gdynia. Their primary area of operations was the passage into the Gulf of Finland. In September–October 1944, Brandi had ordered U-717, U-958, U-370, U-348, U-475, U-745, U-290, U-1165 and U-481 into this area of operations. On 21 September U-242 and U-1001 laid a mine barrage before the peninsula Porkkala which subsequently sank the Finnish cargo ship Rigel. On 8/9 October, U-370 sank one Motor Gun Boat and the Finnish trawler No. 764, U-481 sank a Finnish sailboat on 15 October, U-1165 sank one minesweeper and attacked a submarine convoy, U-958 sank two Finnish sailboats, U-1001 torpedoed one trawler on 25 October, and U-475 sank one patrol boat. In November–December 1944, Brandi dispatched U-475, U-958, U-479, U-481, U-679 and U-1165 into the Bottenbusen, the northern part of the Gulf of Finland, and to the area between Hanko and Rewal. U-679 sank one escort ship and one mine layer and was sunk by the Soviet anti-submarine vessel MO-124 on 9 January 1945. U-481 sank one lighter and probably the Finnish minelayer Louhi on 12 January. (Note: Archival research in Germany in the new millennium revealed that the likely cause was a sound-seeking torpedo fired by U-370.) U-637 sank one patrol boat.

Brandi was awarded the Knight's Cross of the Iron Cross with Oak Leaves, Swords and Diamonds (Ritterkreuz des Eisernen Kreuzes mit Eichenlaub, Schwertern und Brillanten) on 24 November 1944 for his leadership of the U-boat fleet. On 18 December 1944, he was promoted to Fregattenkapitän (Frigate Captain). The presentation was made by Hitler at the Reich Chancellery in the Berlin in early January 1945. In the last year of the war, Brandi became chief commander of the Marinekleinkampfverbände (small naval battle units) in IJmuiden in the Netherlands. On 6 May 1945, Brandi surrendered to Canadian forces in the Netherlands and was taken prisoner of war.

== Later life ==
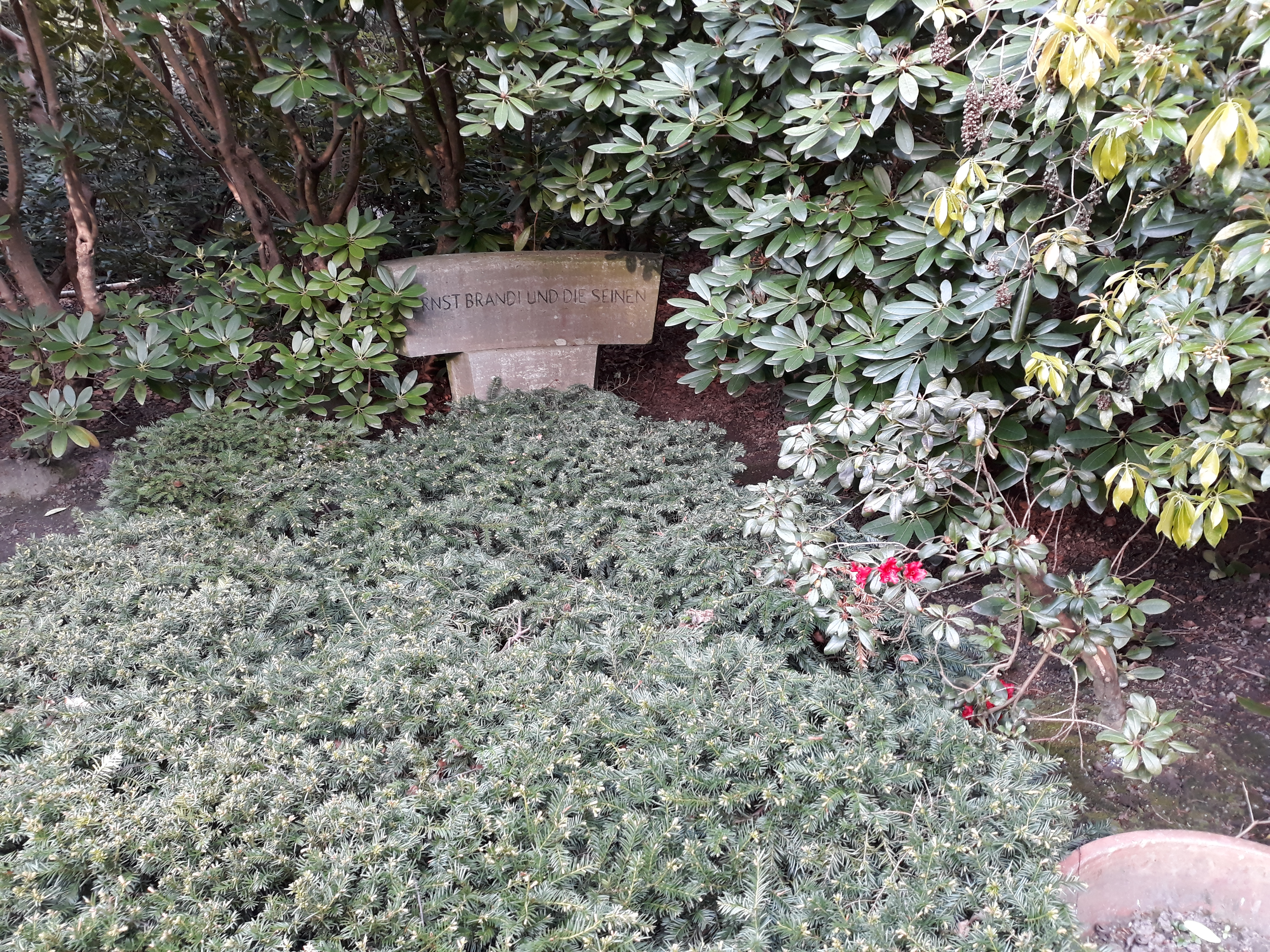
Brandi family grave in Dortmund

In September 1945, Brandi was released from captivity. He became a bricklayer and then studied architecture at the Staatsbauschule (State Construction School) in Essen. He designed a number of buildings which were built in Dortmund and in Saudi Arabia. For three years he served as chairman of the Association of German Architects (Bund Deutscher Architekten). He and his wife Eva had six children. Their daughter Sabine Brandi, born in 1953, is a retired journalist with the Westdeutscher Rundfunk (West German Broadcasting). Brandi fell ill and died on 6 January 1966 at a hospital in Cologne. He was buried with military honors at the Hauptfriedhof Dortmund. His former "Crew 35" comrade, Reinhard Suhren, delivered the eulogy. The Bundesmarine (German Navy) was represented by Konteradmiral (Rear Admiral) Günter Kuhnke.

== Summary of career ==
=== Claimed ships attacked ===
As commander of U-617, U-380 and U-967, Brandi claimed, and was credited with, sinking 20 ships of 115,000 GRT, 3 cruisers and 12 destroyers. Although ships sunk in the Mediterranean were doubled for award purposes, and extra credit was given for sinking warships, Brandi's actual sinkings were "startlingly less" according to Blair. According to Dixon, Brandi sank twelve ships of 31,689 GRT.

=== Awards ===
- Iron Cross (1939) 2nd and 1st Class
- Wehrmacht Long Service Award 4th Class
- Minesweeper War Badge (April 1940)
- U-boat War Badge (8 October 1941)
  - in Gold with Diamonds (April 1943)
- Italian Silver Medal of Military Valor (29 May 1943)
- Knight's Cross of the Iron Cross with Oak Leaves, Swords and Diamonds
  - Knight's Cross on 21 January 1943 as Kapitänleutnant and commander of U-617
  - 224th Oak Leaves on 11 April 1943 as Kapitänleutnant and commander of U-617
  - 66th Swords on 9 May 1944 as Kapitänleutnant and commander of U-380
  - 22nd Diamonds on 24 November 1944 as Korvettenkapitän and commander of U-967
- U-boat Front Clasp in Bronze (1945)

=== Promotions ===
25 September 1935:	Seekadett (Officer Cadet)
1 July 1936:	Fähnrich zur See (Midshipman)
1 January 1938:	Oberfähnrich zur See (Senior Midshipman)
1 April 1938:	Leutnant zur See (Lieutenant at Sea)
1 October 1939:	Oberleutnant zur See (Senior Lieutenant at Sea)
1 October 1942:	Kapitänleutnant (Captain Lieutenant)
1 June 1943:	Kapitänleutnant with rank age dated 1 March 1942
8 June 1944:	Korvettenkapitän (Corvette Captain), effective as of and rank age dated 9 May 1944
18 December 1944:	Fregattenkapitän (Frigate Captain), effective as of 1 August 1944 with rank age dated 1 December 1944
