= Ernst Brandi =

German industrialist (1875–1937)

- Born: 13 July 1875; Osnabrück, Province of Hanover, Kingdom of Prussia, German Empire
- Died: 22 October 1937 (aged 62); Dortmund, Province of Westphalia, Free State of Prussia, Nazi Germany
- Occupation: Industrial manager
- Employer: Vereinigte Stahlwerke
- Relatives: Albrecht Brandi (son); Diez Brandi (nephew); Karl Brandi (brother)
- Military career
- Allegiance: German Empire
- Branch: Landwehr
- Rank: Hauptman (Captain)
- Conflicts: World War I

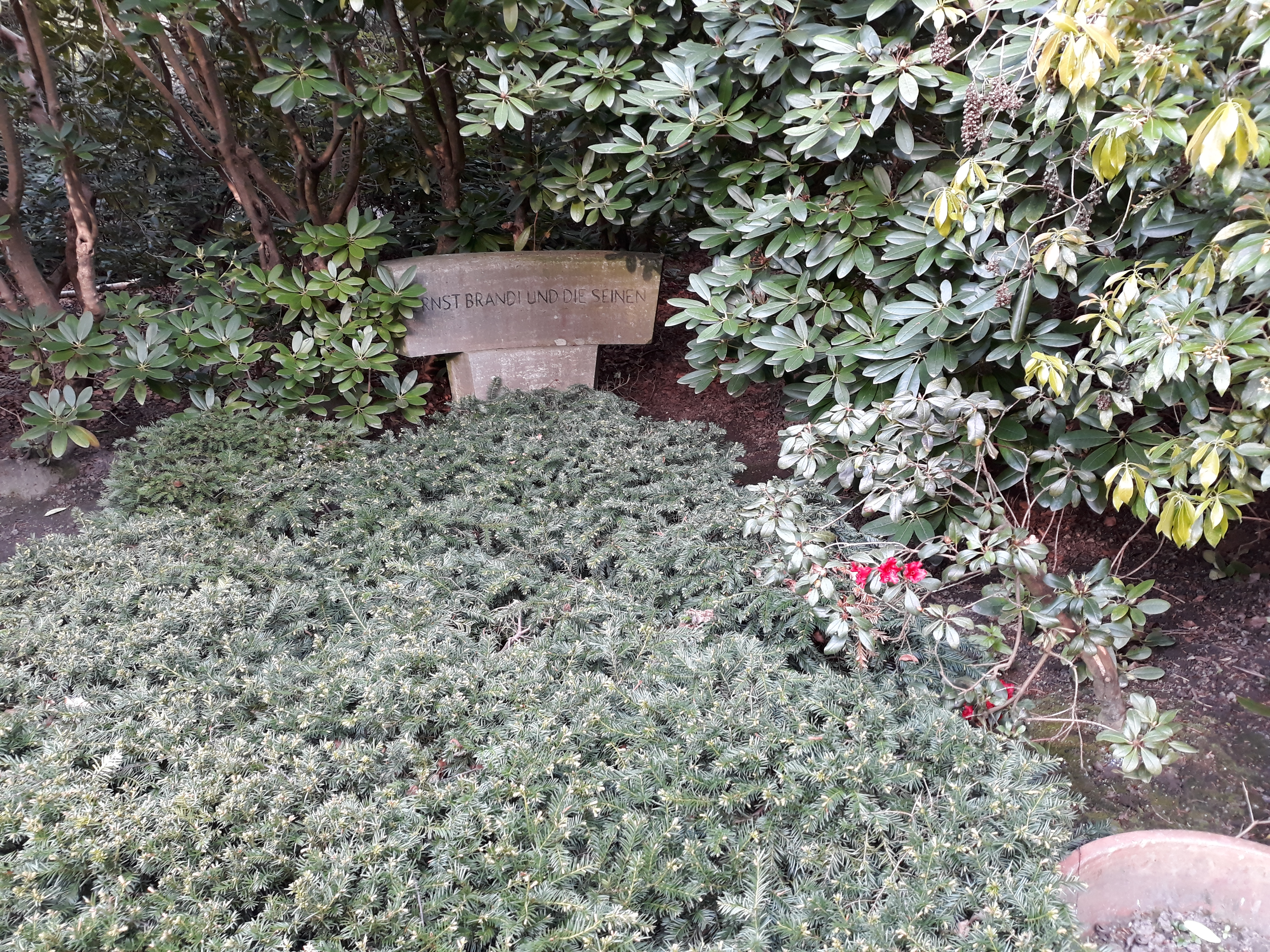
The grave of Ernst Brandi in the Brandi family plot in the Main Cemetery of Dortmund

Ernst Brandi (13 July 1875 – 22 October 1937) was a German mining engineer, industrial manager and chairman of the Ruhrbergbau. He participated in the Secret Meeting of 20 February 1933 between Hitler and 20 to 25 industrialists aimed at financing the election campaign of the Nazi Party.

== Life ==
Ernst Brandi was born in Osnabrück. In 1895 he was a mining trainee at the Zeche Coal Mines and Hansa Coal Mines, after which he studied at the universities of Freiburg and Berlin. In 1900 he passed the first State Exam to become a Mining Official. In 1904, after taking the required second State Exam, he qualified for the position of Mine Assessor. Shortly thereafter, he worked in the East Halle mining district, before he became the Technical Mine Expert for the Emscher River (Mining) Cooperative on 1 October 1904. At the suggestion of Emil Kirdorf, he moved on 1 October 1907 to the Gelsenkirchen Mine AG (GBAG) where he was until 1910 the Area Director of the Hansa Mines, which included the Minister Stein Mine and the Count Hardenburg Mine. In 1911 he became a deputy member of the Board of the GBAG; then in 1914 he was made a full member of the Board. Still later in 1914 he participated in the First World War. Initially a Lieutenant, he later he became an Infantry Captain. After the war, in 1918, he returned as Director of the United Stein, Hardenburg, and Hansa Coal Mines. In 1926, the GBAG became part of the newly founded United Steel Works AG (VSt). Brandi became a member of the board of directors of the VSt and took over the leadership of the Dortmund Group. In 1933, the year the Nazis took power in Germany, the VSt was restructured and the GBAG was reinstituted. Brandi held on to the leadership of the 13 mine shafts belonging to the GBAG. He was a strong advocate for the modernization of mining. Since 1 October 1927, he had been the Chairman of the Bergbauverein (Upper Mining Office District of Dortmund) and the Zechenverband (Coal Mine Society). Also, since 1927, he was a member of the Presidium and the board of directors of the Technical Group of the Reichsverband der Deutschen Industrie (Rdi) (Reich Association of German Industry).

== Politics ==
In 1922, Ernst Brandi, already a member of the National/Liberal German People's Party, became Chairman of the Westphalian Industry Club.

In historical writings, Brandi is considered to be among the few entrepreneurs at the highest level of the German economic world who early on felt sympathy for the Hitler Movement. However, as someone who had one foot in the traditional Conservative camp and the other in the National Socialist (Nazi) camp, he always tried to bring together the national, conservative, middle class rightists with the revolutionary rightists, including the Nazis. Before the seizure of power in the Essen District (Gau Essen), he contributed at least 20,000 Reichsmarks and occasionally more to the Nazis. For example, he gave money for paramilitary armaments for the SA. Ever since he was a student, he studied Scientific Racism as a hobby. In September 1931, together with Albert Vögler, he met Adolf Hitler for the first time in the Kaiserhof Hotel in Berlin. Brandi was very impressed by Hitler. A few weeks later, he was the only major industrialist to participate in the Harzburg Front, where National Socialists (Nazis), The German People's Party (DVP), and The Stahlhelm (Steel Helmet) founded a short-lived movement which they called a "National Opposition." At the same time, he demanded that the chairman of the DVP, Eduard Dingeldey, stop supporting the conservative Reichskanzler Heinrich Brüning of the Catholic Center Party and at the same time join the "National Opposition." As this was unsuccessful, Brandi left the DVP. In a letter from 1931, in view of the Great Depression, he expressed his total contempt for democracy, which at this time of the presidential system in the Weimar Republic in Germany barely existed anymore. His contempt for democracy was behind his turn away from political liberalism:

With these democratic methods, i. e. methods in which everyone has a say and so-called equality rules, we will head further into calamity. The situation will not improve until finally a "strongman" comes along, who with reckless energy just does what is obviously right.

After a conversation with von Papen, which took place on 16 August 1932, near Babelsberg, Brandi changed sides again and now also supported the incumbent Reich government. He did not sign the Industrialists' Petition, in which several National Socialist agrarians, industrialists, and bankers called on Reich President Paul von Hindenburg in November 1932 to appoint Hitler as Reich Chancellor.

After Potsdam Day, in 1933 the National Socialists dissolved the Zechenverband as part of their destruction of the trade unions and the abolition of collective bargaining autonomy. The Bergbauverein remained in existence as a technical/scientific association. In a letter dated 6 February 1933 to the editor-in-chief of the Deutsche Allgemeine Zeitung, Brandi portrayed his past in such a way that he claimed he had always been positively inclined toward National Socialism. He wrote:

May I [...] remind you that in the course of last summer, at every meeting—particularly at the midday ones—I myself strongly emphasized the unavoidable necessity of viewing the National Socialist movement with goodwill and with an increasingly positive attitude, and that Hitler's chancellorship would represent the only way out.

— Ernst Brandi

Similarly, he also participated in Hitler's secret meeting with important German industrialists on 20 February 1933. In October 1934, Brandi, in response to a request from the treasurer of the Gau Westphalia-South, wrote to Gauleiter Josef Wagner a summary of financial contributions from private industry to the Nazi Party since 1 February 1932:

Meanwhile, I feel obliged to point out to you that the result can undoubtedly not give you an accurate picture, because—as I wish to tell you with complete frankness—certainly some contributions were made under the assurance of confidentiality. Through the letter from your Gau treasurer, many of my colleagues are placed in a highly embarrassing moral conflict: on one hand, they would gladly comply with the disclosure of contributions, but on the other hand, they feel bound by the promises they have given.

On 22 December 1934, Brandi became head of the Ruhr District Group of the Fachgruppe Steinkohlenbergbau (Technical Group for Bituminous Coal Mining). He was also active in numerous committees, such as the Social-Economic Committee of the Reichsgruppe Industrie, the advisory board of the Wirtschaftsgruppe Bergbau (Mining Economy Group), various joint organizations of the Ruhr mining industry, and on the board of the Verein deutscher Eisenhüttenleute (Association of German Iron and Steel Industrialists). In April 1937, Brandi requested release from the leadership of the Ruhr District Group from Reich Economics Minister Hjalmar Schacht due to work overload. On the evening of 14 October 1937, he suddenly collapsed at work and was admitted to the hospital in Dortmund, where he died on 22 October 1937. Numerous prominent figures from the Ruhr industrial sector, including Gustav Knepper, Albert Vögler, Fritz Thyssen, and Heinrich Wisselmann, attended the funeral ceremonies at the group administration and at the main cemetery.

== Honors ==
- Dr.-Ing. E. h. der Bergakademie Clausthal (1927)

=== Sources ===
- Abelshauser, Werner (2009). Ruhrkohle und Politik: Ernst Brandi 1875–1937 — Eine Biographie [Ruhr Coal and Politics: Ernst Brandi 1875–1937 — A Biography] (in German). Essen: Klartext. ISBN 978-3-8375-0203-9.
- Pudor, Fritz (1955). "Brandi, Ernst". Neue Deutsche Biographie (in German). Vol. 2. Berlin: Duncker & Humblot. pp. 522–523. (.html full text online).
