= Karl Brandi =

German historian (1868–1946)

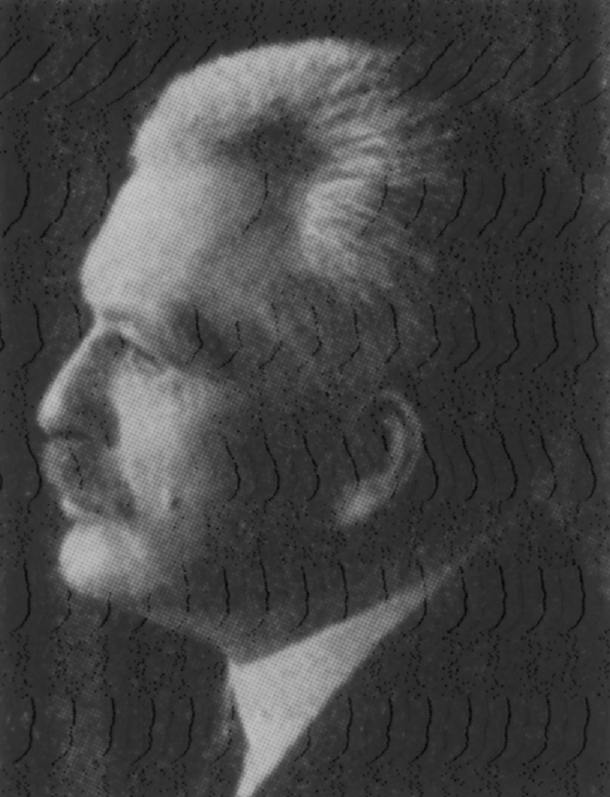
- Born: 20 May 1868; Meppen, Province of Hanover, Kingdom of Prussia, North German Confederation
- Died: 9 March 1946 (aged 77); Göttingen, Province of Hanover, Allied-occupied Germany
- Education: Ludwig-Maximilians-Universität München; University of Strasbourg (PhD); University of Göttingen (Dr. phil. hab.)
- Occupation: Historian
- Employer(s): Marburg University; University of Göttingen
- Relatives: Albrecht Brandi (nephew); Diez Brandi (son); Ernst Brandi (brother)
- Military career
- Allegiance: German Empire
- Branch: Landwehr
- Conflicts: World War I
- Awards: Iron Cross

Karl Maria Prosper Laurenz Brandi (20 May 1868 – 9 March 1946) was a German historian.

== Biography ==
Brandi studied history and geography at the Ludwig-Maximilians-Universität München for three years beginning in April 1886. Then, he went to Paul Scheffer-Boichorst to the University of Strasbourg. From 1890 to 1891, He wrote his dissertation on the Reichenauer documents: Die Reichenauer Urkundenfälschungen, which served as Volume 1 of Quellen und Forschungen zur Geschichte der Abtei Reichenau. He followed his teacher Scheffer-Boichorst to the Friedrich Wilhelm University of Berlin in the years from 1891 to 1895. The Munich Historical Commission directed him to complete the posthumous works on August von Druffel's contributions to imperial history and the Council of Trent, Monumenta Tridentina. In 1895, he completed his own habilitation at the University of Göttingen. From 1902 until his retirement in 1936, and again, from the outbreak of World War II until shortly before his death, he held a professorship for German History at the University of Göttingen. His study of Charles V, Holy Roman Emperor represented a groundbreaking shift in the study of the importance of Charles's reign. According to Brandi, Charles V was the last monarch of Germany to have attempted the establishment of the medieval universal Christian monarchy: in this, the Emperor was influenced by the legacy of his predecessors dating back to Charlemagne and by the amalgamation of Burgundian, Spanish, and Austrian court traditions.

Brandi was also twice chairman of the Verband der Historiker und Historikerinnen Deutschlands.

== Works ==
- Mittelalterliche Weltanschauung, Humanismus und nationale Bildung. Vortrag gehalten in der Versammlung der Freunde des humanistischen Gymnasiums in Berlin und der Provinz Brandenburg am 23. Januar 1925. Weidmann, 1925 – Medieval worldview, humanism and national education.
- Geschichte der Geschichtswissenschaft, Universitäts-Verlag, 1947 – History of historical science.
- The emperor Charles V; the growth and destiny of a man and of a world empire, English translation published in 1939. This book is mentioned in Anne Frank's The Diary of a Young Girl, who, while hiding with her family from the Nazis in Amsterdam, read and enjoyed the book.
