= Werner Abelshauser =

German economic historian

- Born: 24 November 1944 (age 81); Wiesloch, Baden-Württemberg, Nazi Germany

Academic background
- Education: University of Mannheim; Ruhr University Bochum (PhD)

Academic work
- Discipline: Economic history
- Institutions: European University Institute; Bielefeld University

Werner Abelshauser (born 24 November 1944 in Wiesloch, near Heidelberg) is a German economic historian.

== Life ==
Abelshauser studied economics at the University of Mannheim and graduated in 1970. He received his PhD at Ruhr University Bochum in 1973 with his dissertation on West German economy from 1945 to 1948. In 1980 he was appointed as professor for economic and social history in Bochum. From 1983 to 1988, he was acting director of the institute for the research on the European workers movement (IGA, now institute for social movements, ISB). He was visiting professor at Bielefeld, Göttingen, Cologne, (Germany), Oxford (United Kingdom), Florence (Italy), St. Louis, Missouri (United States) and Sydney (Australia). From 1988 to 1991, he held the chair in European history of the 20th century at the European University Institute (EUI) in Florence. Since 1991, he heads the chair in economic history at Bielefeld University.

He is a member of the Institute for Research on Science and Technology and founding member of the Bielefeld Institute for Global Society Studies. He was among the editors of the journal Geschichte und Gesellschaft ("History and Society"), the leading journal of history as social science, and the Journal of Comparative Government and European Policy (ZSE).

== Focus of research ==
Abelshauser's dissertation (published 1975) was the first theory-based thesis on the causes of the German "Wirtschaftswunder" (the so-called economic miracle of the early federal republic) that included the relevant sources for that topic. Its findings put into perspective the impact of the Marshall Plan, the monetary reform of 1948 and Ludwig Erhard's model of social market economy as the crucial forces behind the comeback of the West German economy in the 1950s. Instead, the study points out the importance of the specific circumstances of reconstruction of the West German economy, which could not be reproduced after the Long 1950s.

Most of Abelshauser's arguments were first fiercely criticised by historians as well as in prominent public newspapers like the Frankfurter Allgemeine Zeitung, but his thesis is now broadly accepted in the field. The newsweekly "Die Zeit" concluded in 1996 that Abelshauser rewrote the economic history of the Federal Republic. His book "Deutsche Wirtschaftsgeschichte seit 1945" (German Economic History since 1945, newly published 2004) is among the benchmarks of German economic history.

Abelshauser's second field of research is business history. His work on the history of the chemical company BASF (2004, German original edition 2002, 2003, 2007) and on the history of the steel giant Krupp during the Third Reich (2002) is core literature for the "new business history" (Hans-Ulrich Wehler) and was crucial for the emergence of this new discipline. There, Abelshauser focuses on companis' specific and historically-established cultures and their economic importance for current business decisions.

A third field is the reaction of the German social system of production to the second economic revolution (see Douglass North). According to Abelshauser, globalization and scientification at the end of the 19th century created "new industries", which focused on immaterial production. Manwhile, a set of economic institutions was established and still shapes the German economy. His "The Dynamics of German Industry" (2005, German original edition 2002, Jap. edition 2009) interprets historic and recent pressures on those institutions as part of a struggle between two different systems of capitalism (American vs. "Rhenish" (European) capitalism). His thesis, which until up to the 2008 financial crisis stood against the scientific and public mainstream, gives him the reputation of a prominent supporter of the European model of capitalism in the era of globalization.

Recently, Abelshauser's focus has turned towards scientific biography. As shown in his work on Hans Matthoefer (2009), he aims to find out th conditions under which people change their way of thinking and acting and, in doing so, help to create new economic, political or social institutions. With his biographical approach, h added a new method to the corpus of the school of new institutional economics.

== Works ==
- German Industry and Global Enterprise. (BASF: The History of a Company), Cambridge University Press, Cambridge, New York 2004, ISBN 0-521-82726-4.
- The Dynamics of German Industry. Germany's Path toward the New Economy and the American Challenge, Berghahn Books, New York, Oxford 2005, ISBN 1-84545-072-8, Jap. edition: Keizaibunka no tousou, 3rd, enlarged edition of the German original, University of Tokyo Press, Tokyo 2009, ISBN 978-4-13-040246-0.
- Deutsche Wirtschaftsgeschichte seit 1945. C. H. Beck Verlag, Munich 2004, ISBN 3-406-51094-9. Jap. edition: Gendai Doitsu Keizairon, Asashi Shuppansha, Tokyo 1994, ISBN 4-255-94003-7.
- Wirtschaft in Westdeutschland 1945–1948. Rekonstruktion und Wachstumsbedingungen in der amerikanischen und britischen Zone, Diss., Universität Bochum, Abteilung für Geschichtswissenschaft; also: DVA, Stuttgart 1975, ISBN 3-421-01714-X
- Wirtschaft und Rüstung in den Fünfziger Jahren. (Anfänge westdeutscher Sicherheitspolitik 1945–1956), Bd. 4/1, ed. by Militärgeschichtliches Forschungsamt, Oldenbourg Verlag, Munich 1997. Reprint 2001, ISBN 3-486-50882-2.
- Rüstungsschmiede der Nation? Der Kruppkonzern im Dritten Reich und in der Nachkriegszeit 1933–1951.(= Part III of L. Gall (ed.), Krupp im 20. Jahrhundert. Die Geschichte des Unternehmens vom Ersten Weltkrieg bis zur Gründung der Stiftung), Siedler Verlag, Berlin 2002, ISBN 3-88680-742-8.
- Des Kaisers neue Kleider? Wandlungen der sozialen Marktwirtschaft (=Roman Herzog Institut, Position 7), München 2009, ISBN 978-3-941036-06-2.
- Ruhrkohle und Politik: Ernst Brandi 1875–1937. Eine Biographie [Ruhr Coal and Politics: Ernst Brandi 1875–1937 — A Biography] (in German). Klartext, Essen 2009. ISBN 978-3-8375-0203-9.
- Nach dem Wirtschaftswunder. Der Gewerkschafter, Politiker und Unternehmer Hans Matthoefer, Dietz Verlag, Bonn 2009, ISBN 978-3-8012-4171-1.
- Kulturen der Weltwirtschaft (= Geschichte und Gesellschaft, Sonderheft 24), Göttingen 2012 (with David A. Gilgen and Andreas Leutzsch), ISBN 978-3-525-36424-6
