= Erich Förste =

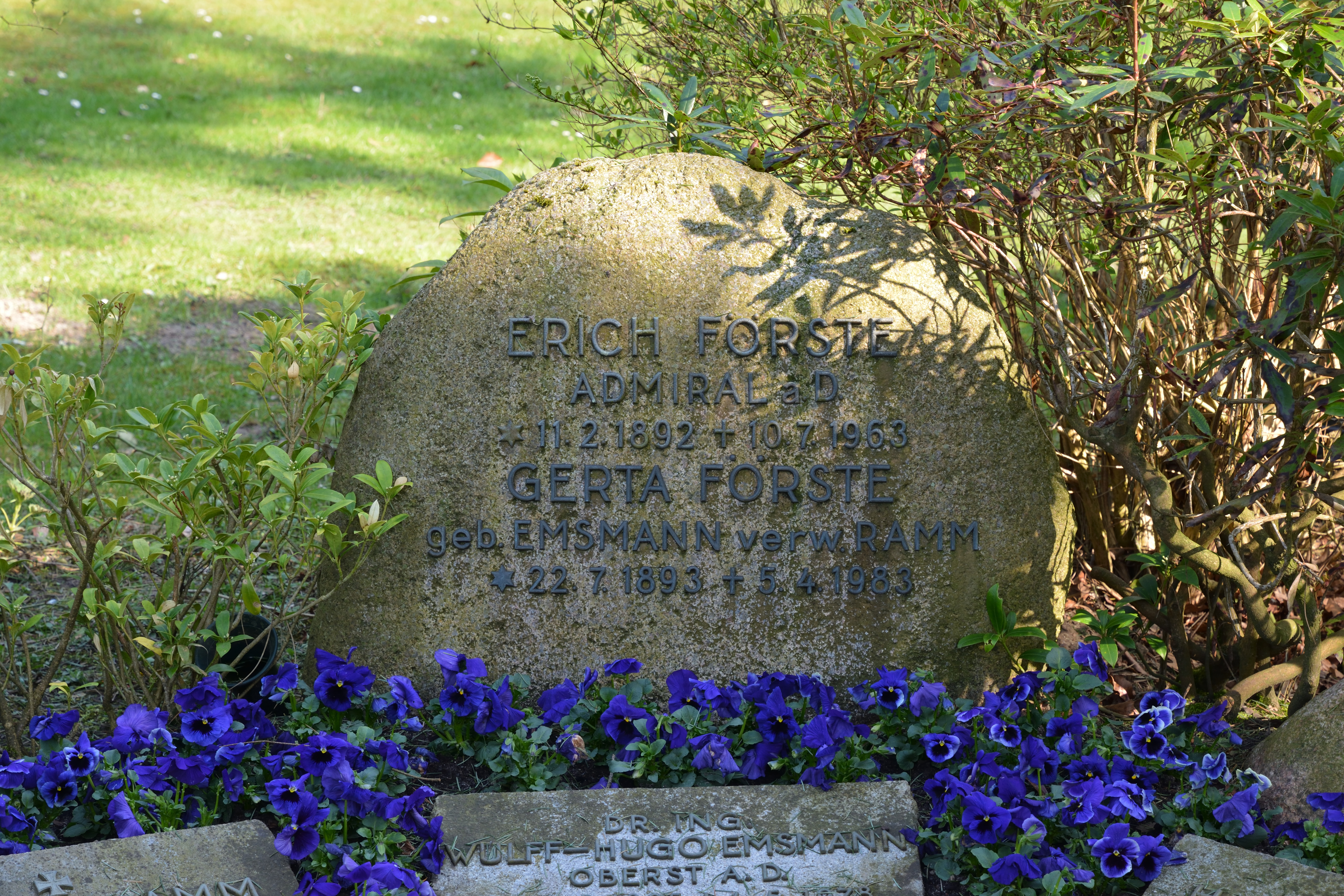
- Born: 11 February 1892; Magdeburg, German Empire
- Died: 11 February 1963 (aged 70); Kiel, West Germany
- Military career
- Allegiance: German Empire (to 1918); Weimar Republic (to 1933); Nazi Germany
- Branch: Imperial German Navy; Reichsmarine; Kriegsmarine
- Service years: 1910–1945
- Rank: Admiral
- Units: SMS Hertha; Friedrich der Grosse; U-86
- Commands: UB-34; UB-99; Torpedo boat T-143 and T-141 cruiser Karlsruhe battleship Gneisenau
- Conflicts: World War I World War II
- Awards: German Cross in Gold

Erich Förste (11 February 1892 – 10 July 1963) was a German naval officer who served in the Kaiserliche Marine, the Reichsmarine and the Kriegsmarine, eventually reaching the rank of Admiral during World War II.

== Awards ==
- Iron Cross (1914) 2nd and 1st Class
- U-boat War Badge (1918)
- Wound Badge in Black
- Knight's Cross of the Albert Order 2nd Class with Swords
- Clasp to the Iron Cross (1939) 2nd and 1st Class
- German Cross in Gold on 25 May 1943 as Vizeadmiral and commanding admiral Aegean Sea
