= August von Druffel =

German historian (1841–1891)

August von Druffel (21 August 1841, Koblenz, Germany – 23 October 1891, Munich, Germany) was a German historian.

He studied history, economics and military science at the University of Innsbruck, the University of Göttingen, and the Friedrich Wilhelm University of Berlin, receiving his doctorate in 1862 with a dissertation-thesis on Henry IV and his sons. At the University of Göttingen, he was especially influenced by the teachings of historian Georg Waitz. In 1875, he became an associate member of the Bavarian Academy of Sciences, gaining a full membership in 1884. In 1885, he was named an honorary professor at the Ludwig-Maximilians-Universität München.

== Selected works ==
- Kaiser Heinrich IV. und seine Söhne (1862) – Henvy IV and his sons.
- Beiträge zur Reichsgeschichte (3 volumes, 1873–96; with Karl Brandi) – Contributions to imperial history.
- Briefe und Akten zur Geschichte des sechzehnten Jahrhunderts. Mit besonderer Rücksicht auf Bayerns Fürstenhaus (as editor; 3 volumes, 1877) – Letters and files on the history of the 16th century; with special reference to Bavaria's royal house.
- Des Viglius van Zwichem Tagebuch des Schmalkaldischen Donaukriegs (1877) – Viglius' diary of the Schmalkaldic Danube War.
- Kaiser Karl V. und die römische Curie, 1544–1546 (4 volumes, 1877–91) – Charles V and the Roman Curia, 1544–46.
- Ignatius von Loyola an der Römischen Curie, 1879 – Ignatius of Loyola and the Roman Curia.
- Monumenta Tridentina (1884–99, 5 volumes; continued by Karl Brandi) – work involving the history of the Council of Trent.
