= Larry Druffel =

American engineer (born 1940)

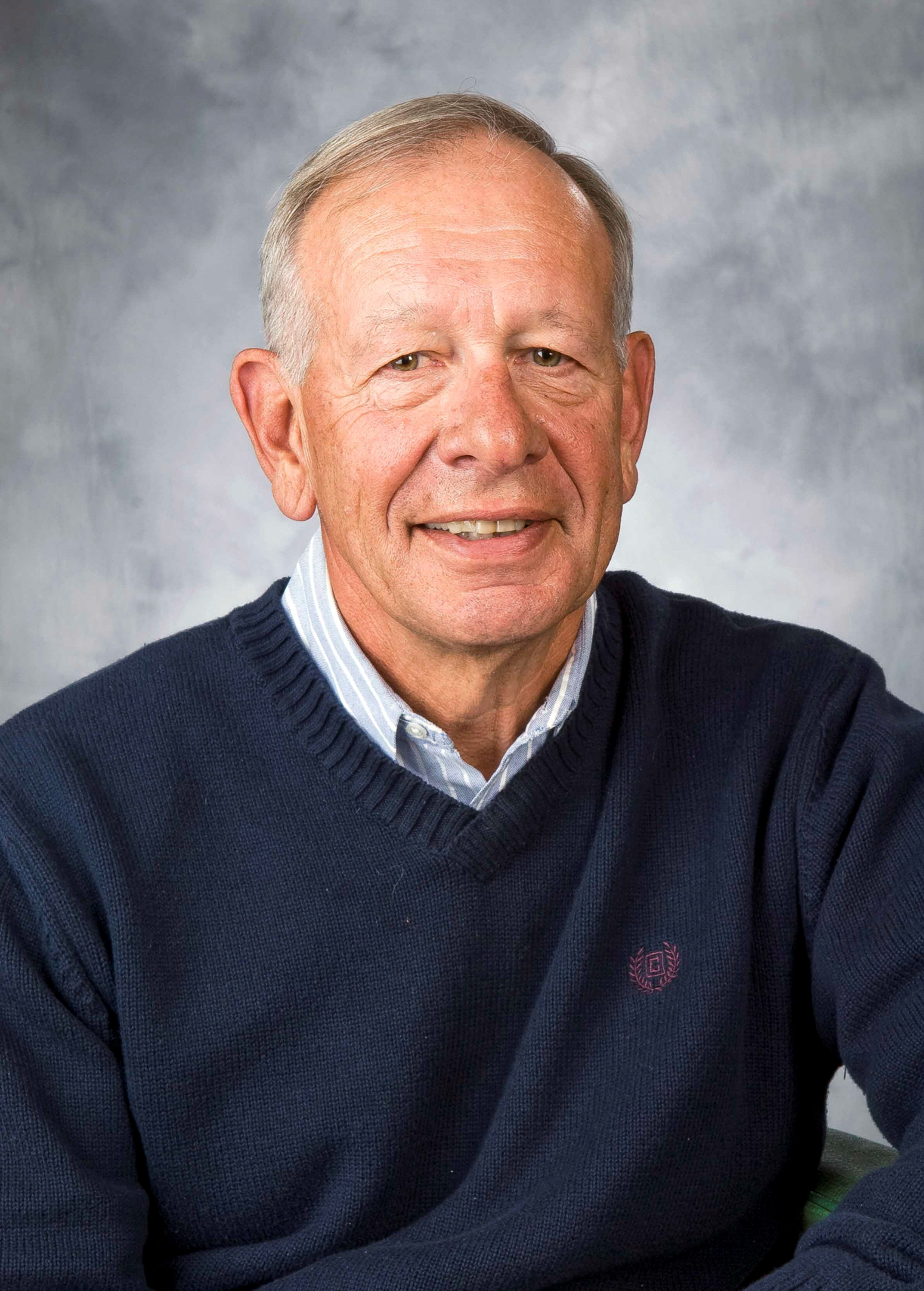
- Born: Larry E. Druffel; May 11, 1940 (age 86); Quincy, Illinois, U.S.
- Education: University of Illinois Urbana-Champaign (BS); University of London (MSc); Vanderbilt University (PhD)
- Occupation: Engineer

Larry E. Druffel (born May 11, 1940) is an American engineer, director emeritus and visiting scientist at the Software Engineering Institute (SEI) at Carnegie Mellon University. He has published over 40 professional papers/reports and authored a textbook. He is best known for leadership in: (1) bringing engineering discipline and supporting technology to software design and development, and (2) addressing network and software security risks.

== Early life and education ==
Druffel was born in Quincy, Illinois. He earned a B.S. in electrical engineering from the University of Illinois Urbana-Champaign in January 1963. While an undergraduate, his paper "Machine Recognition of Speech" was selected by AIEE (now IEEE) as the best student paper for 1962. While stationed in England with the Air Force, he earned an M.Sc. in computer science at the University of London in 1967 and later earned a Ph.D. in systems and information science from Vanderbilt University in 1975.

== Military career ==
After graduating from the University of Illinois, he spent nine months on an HF communications design team at Collins Radio. He was accepted for USAF Officer Training and was commissioned in the USAF as a Distinguished Graduate from OTS. He served as a communications/electronics officer in Chicksands England, and at Hq. Communications Service at Scott AFB, where he led a team introducing computers to replace hardware switching for local digital military exchange systems.

In 1969, he joined the faculty at the Air Force Academy where he taught computer science and electrical engineering. He volunteered for Vietnam in 1971, where he was Chief of the Intelligence Data Handling System Center. Upon returning to the U.S. in 1972, he attended Vanderbilt University, earning a Ph.D. in Systems and Information Science. His research involved algorithms for small-scale integrated circuit CAD systems. In 1975, he returned to the faculty at the Air Force Academy as associate professor and Deputy Head of Computer Science.

In 1978, he joined DARPA where he worked for Bob Kahn. There he managed the Artificial Intelligence Image Understanding Program and two testbeds to demonstrate packet radio technology in operational environments. He also managed a new program in software. His research experience developing CAD systems demonstrated that such systems could support and enforce engineering discipline for hardware design. Convinced that the same could be done for software design, he focused the software research on developing tools and technology that would lead to Integrated Software Development Environments.

With the DoD managed Ada program coming to fruition, he initiated an effort to apply early results of the software research program to define the requirements for an Ada Programming Support Environment. In 1981, he became Director of Computer Systems and Software in the Office of the Deputy Undersecretary of Defense for Research and Advanced Technology, with responsibility to coordinate the relevant research programs of the military departments. This position included responsibility for the Ada Program where he was able to influence the use of Ada as a mechanism to introduce engineering discipline to software and manage development of the supporting technology.

=== Software Research Initiative ===
Recognizing that although software was becoming the enabler of systems flexibility it was also a source of potential risk, he led a joint service team to define a major software initiative (STARS) that included research in a variety of supporting technologies. The proposed initiative also included the creation of a Software Engineering Institute to evaluate and mature emerging technology for transition to defense systems. The STARS proposal was broadly supported in the technical community, embraced by the DoD, and funding approved by Congress.

== Later career ==
=== Leadership in technology innovation ===
Upon retiring from the USAF in August 1983, Druffel became a vice president at Rational, a corporation developing an innovative approach to integrated software development support environments. Rational introduced dedicated hardware support for seamless integration of supporting tools. He helped refine the strategy and successfully introduce the product to the software engineering community, including international customers.

The Software Engineering Institute contract was awarded to Carnegie Mellon University in 1984, while Druffel was at Rational. In 1986, Angel G. Jordan, the provost at CMU, asked Druffel to take over as Director. He spent the next ten years recruiting leaders in the field, and focusing the effort on bringing an engineering discipline to software development. Under his leadership, the SEI engaged the software engineering community to mature the practice.

Among the steps to aggressively influence systems security, Druffel worked with DARPA to create the Computer Emergency Response Team (CERT) at the SEI. The CERT has been a major contributor to computer security both in the US and abroad. Based on increasing malware activity, he began advocating the development of a Defensive Information Warfare Strategy.

Druffel left the SEI in 1996 to become president and CEO of SCRA, a non-profit R&D Corporation providing technology solutions to the DoD. In 2006, he retired from SCRA and in 2007, returned to the SEI as a visiting scientist, working with the president and CEO Paul Nielsen on strategic issues. While serving in that capacity he has compiled and edited the Technical History of the SEI that chronicles the evolution of software engineering over thirty years.

Over the last 30 years, the SEI has influenced defense and commercial software developers in a broad range of software engineering areas initiated under his direction (real-time and cyber physical systems, software architecture, software process management embodied in the software capability maturity model (CMM), software measurement, software product lines, software methods and tools, software education, network and software security, and computer forensics).

== Service to profession and society ==
- Member, IEEE Simon Ramo Medal Committee (Chair 2013–14)
- Chair, ACM Grace Murray Hopper Award Committee (Chair 1984–85)
- Member of US Air Force Science Advisory Board (AFSAB) (1991–95)
- Member of the Defense Intelligence Agency Science Advisory Board (1993–96)
- Member of NASA Johnson Space Flight Center Software Advisory Board
- Member of National Research Council Study "Engineering Challenges to the Long Term Operation of the Space Station" (1998)
- Member of National Research Council Naval Studies Board Study "Naval Forces’ Capability for Theater Missile Defense" (2000)
- Member of National Research Council on study of Critical Code-Software Producibility for Defense (2010).
- Chair of AFSAB study on "Information Architectures that enhance Operation Capabilities in Peacetime and Wartime" (1994)
- Led the "Defensive Information Warfare in the 21st Century" panel for the AFSAB 50th Anniversary "New World Vistas" (1995)
- Co-chair (with George Heilmeier) of Defense Science Board Study on "Acquiring Defense Software Commercially" (1994)
- Member of the National Security Agency Science Advisory Board Study on Cryptanalysis (1997)
- Director of Rational (1986–1992)
- Member of IEEE Technical Committee on Software Engineering (1982–1985)
- Board Member of the Oak Ridge Association of Universities (ORAU) (1998–2000)

== Honors and awards ==
- Fellow of the IEEE: Citation "for leadership in defining and managing national software technology programs"(1991)
- Fellow of the ACM: Citation "For leadership in advancing the state of software engineering practice and technical contributions to design automation and software development environments" (1995).
- DoD Superior Service Medal: Citation "Lt. Col. Druffel helped define the future technology strategy, not only for the Department of Defense, but for a major portion of the Defense Industry" (1983).
- DoD Exceptional Civilian Service Medal: Citation: "In recognition of his Distinguished performance on the Air Force Science Advisory board" (1995).
- Tau Beta Pi
