= HMS Weston =

Sloop of the Royal Navy

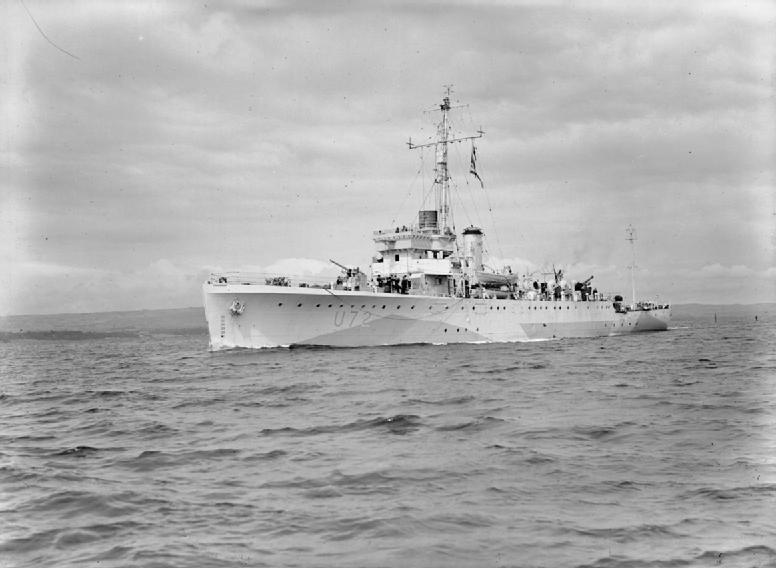
- Weston in 1943

History

United Kingdom
- Name: HMS Weston
- Builder: Devonport Dockyard
- Laid down: 7 September 1931
- Launched: 23 July 1932
- Completed: 23 February 1933
- Identification: Pennant number: L72 (later U72)
- Fate: Scrapped 1947

General characteristics
- Class & type: Shoreham-class sloop
- Displacement: 1,105 long tons (1,123 t)
- Length: 281 ft (86 m)
- Beam: 35 ft (11 m)
- Draught: 8 ft 3 in (2.51 m)
- Propulsion: Geared turbines, 2 shafts, 2,000 shp (1,491 kW)
- Speed: 16 knots (18 mph; 30 km/h)
- Complement: 95
- Armament: 2 × QF 4 in (100 mm) Mk V guns (2×1); 4 × .5 inch anti-aircraft machine guns (1×4)

HMS Weston was a Shoreham-class sloop (Note: Officially classified as being a member of the "repeat Shoreham-class", although sometimes described as the Falmouth-class) of the British Royal Navy. Weston was built at Devonport Dockyard in 1931–1933.

Weston served in African waters and in the Red Sea in the 1930s. In the Second World War, she was used for convoy escort duties, operating in British waters and in the North Atlantic, sinking the German submarine U-13 in 1940, and later in West African waters. The ship was laid up in reserve after the end of the war in Europe and was scrapped in 1947.

== Construction and design ==
The British Admiralty ordered four sloops as part of the 1930 construction programme, with three ordered from Devonport and one from Chatham dockyard. Classified as repeat Shoreham or Falmouth-class ships, they, like the four Shoreham-class sloops ordered under the 1929 construction programme, were a lengthened and improved version of the Hastings class of the 1928 programme, which were themselves a modification of the Bridgewater class. They were intended for a dual role of patrol service in overseas stations in peacetime and minesweeping during war.

Weston was 281 feet 4 inches (85.75 m) long overall, with a beam of 35 feet (10.67 m) and a draught of 10 feet 2 inches (3.10 m) at full load. Displacement was 1,060 long tons (1,080 t) standard and 1,515 long tons (1,539 t) deep load. Two Admiralty 3-drum water-tube boilers fed two geared steam turbines which drove two propeller shafts. The machinery was rated at 2,000 shaft horsepower (1,500 kW), giving a speed of 16.5 knots (30.6 km/h; 19.0 mph).

The ship's main gun armament consisted of two 4-inch (102 mm) QF Mk V guns mounted fore-and-aft on the ship's centreline, with the forward gun on a High-Angle (HA) anti-aircraft mounting and the aft gun on a Low-Angle (LA) mounting, suitable only for use against surface targets. Four 3-pounder saluting guns completed the ship's gun armament. The initial anti-submarine armament consisted of four depth charges. The ship had a crew of 100 officers and other ranks.

Weston was laid down at Devonport Dockyard on 7 September 1931. She was launched on 23 July 1932 and completed on 23 February 1933, with the pennant number L72.

=== Modifications ===
The repeat Shorehams were modified in 1937 to 1939 to improve their anti-aircraft capability, with Weston having a major refit in 1939, with the aft 4-inch gun being replaced by a second HA gun, and a quadruple Vickers .50 machine gun mount added for close-in anti-aircraft duties. In September 1939, a second quadruple machine gun mount was added. The ship's armament continued to be modified through the war, with the 3-pounder guns and the multiple machine guns removed, and first two, and later another two single Oerlikon 20 mm autocannon added. The ship's anti-submarine armament was also gradually increased during the war, with the number of depth charges carried increasing from 15 to as many as 60–90. Other wartime changes included the fitting of radar and High-frequency direction finding gear.

== Service ==
Weston, which was nicknamed "Aggie on Horseback" in service (based on the ship's namesake, Weston-Super-Mare and the Victorian philanthropist Agnes Weston, founder of the Royal Sailors' Rests in Plymouth and Portsmouth), came under command of the Commander-in-Chief, Africa on commissioning, where she served until August 1935, when the sloop joined the East Indies Station, operating in the Red Sea.

The ship started a major refit at Malta in February 1939, and in June that year was moved to Portsmouth Dockyard, where the refit was continued, completing in September 1939. Weston was then assigned to the Rosyth Escort Force, but on 13 September 1939 ran aground in the North Sea on her way to Rosyth, although damage was minor. Duties in the Rosyth Escort Force included escorting convoys along the East coast of Britain. On 14 December 1939, the destroyer Kelly struck a mine off the Tyne. Weston, along with the sloop Grimsby and the destroyer Woolston, escorted Kelly as she was towed into port.

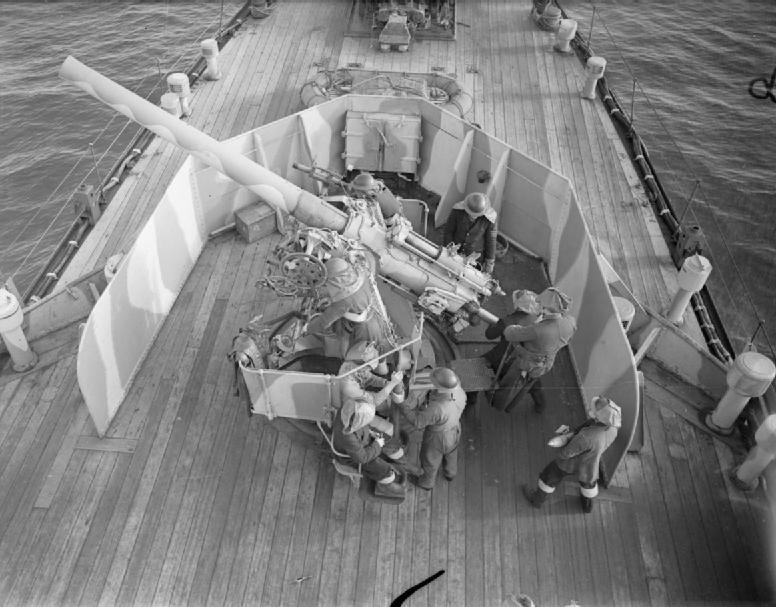
Weston's forward 4 inch gun

On 24 February 1940, Weston rescued 27 survivors from the merchant ship Royal Archer, which had been sunk by a mine off the Firth of Forth earlier that day. In May 1939, Weston's pennant number changed from L72 to U72. On 31 May, Weston depth-charged the German submarine U-13 off Lowestoft while escorting the convoy FN.184, forcing the submarine to scuttle herself. All of U-13's crew were picked up by Weston, while a set of standing orders from Admiral Karl Dönitz prohibiting the rescue of survivors by German U-boats in British waters was also recovered. These orders were used in the prosecution case against Donitz at the Nuremberg trials in 1946. On 1 August 1940, when escorting Convoy FN 239, Weston claimed a German bomber shot down while escorting a convoy.

From January 1941, Weston was part of the Northern Escort Force, and from July 1941, the Londonderry Sloop Division. By 1 October that year, Weston was part of the 42nd Escort Group, (Note: Along with Folkestone, Londonderry, Wellington, Sennen and Totland) still based at Londonderry Port. On 29 November 1941, Weston was escorting Convoy OS 12 when it was attacked by the German submarine U-43, which sank two freighters before being driven off by the sloops Totland and Sennen. Weston was refitted at Dundee between June and September 1942.

In late February 1943, Weston formed part of the escort for the tanker convoy UC 1, consisting of 32 ships (mainly empty oil tankers), travelling from Britain to Curaçao in the Caribbean, with a Royal Navy close escort of four sloops and two frigates, (Note: Weston, Folkestone, Totland, Gorleston, Exe and Ness) supported by a support group of four US Navy destroyers. (Note: Charles F. Hughes, Madison, Lansdowne and Hilary P. Jones) From 23 February the convoy came under attack by a group of 11 German submarines, with three tankers being sunk and two more damaged, with one U-boat, U-522 being sunk by Totland. Weston was refitted at Belfast between June and August 1943, and was then sent to Freetown to join the West Africa Command, joining Escort Group 55, also based at Freetown, in March 1944. In October 1944, Weston was sent to Bermuda for a refit, and in January 1945, returned to Britain for completion of the refit at Portsmouth. On completion of the refit, Weston was used for escorting coastal convoys until the end of the war in Europe.

In June 1945, Weston was laid up in reserve, and on 22 May 1947, she was transferred to British Iron & Steel Corporation for scrapping.
