= CU convoys =

Convoys during naval battles of the Second World War

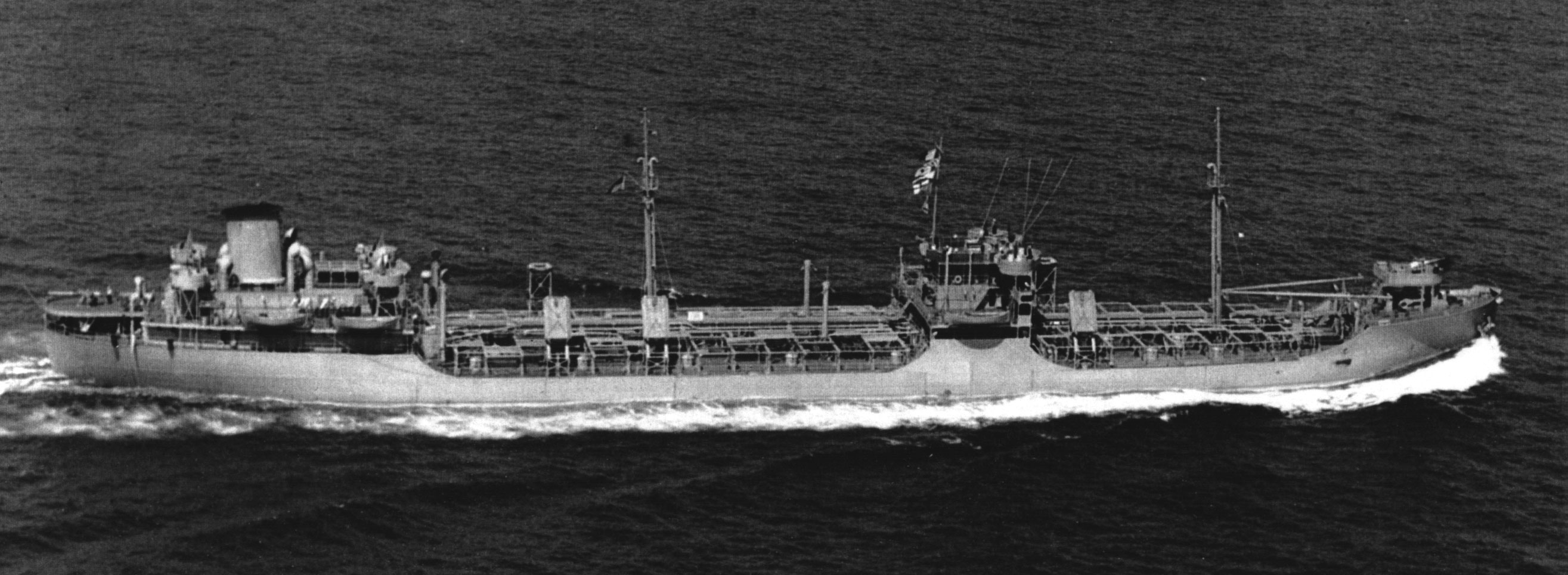
CU convoys were designed to protect fast, modern tankers like this mass-produced T2: Hat Creek

The CU convoys were a World War II series of fast trans-Atlantic convoys to the British Isles. The earliest convoys of the series were tankers sailing directly from petroleum refineries at Curaçao to the United Kingdom. Most convoys of the series assembled in New York City and included fast freighters and troopships, with tankers arriving from Aruba via TAG convoys to Guantánamo Bay and GN convoys from Guantánamo to New York.

== Background ==
Allied war materials had been transported from North America to the United Kingdom in HX convoys since 1939 and in slower SC convoys since 1940. These convoys were escorted by the Royal Navy and Royal Canadian Navy. The United States Navy provided a few escorts to HX and SC convoys from September 1941 through April 1943.

CU convoys were established as an emergency measure to maintain petroleum fuel reserves in the United Kingdom for continued strategic bombing of Europe following heavy tanker losses along the east coast of North America during the Second Happy Time. Modern tankers could travel faster than the 9-knot (17 km/h; 10 mph) HX convoys, and the CU convoys were continued as a very fast (14-knot (26 km/h; 16 mph)) convoy series along the HX convoy route. United States destroyer escorts provided anti-submarine screens for CU convoys because the Flower-class corvettes of the British and Canadian Mid-Ocean Escort Force were not fast enough to maneuver with these convoys.

== Loaded ships eastbound ==
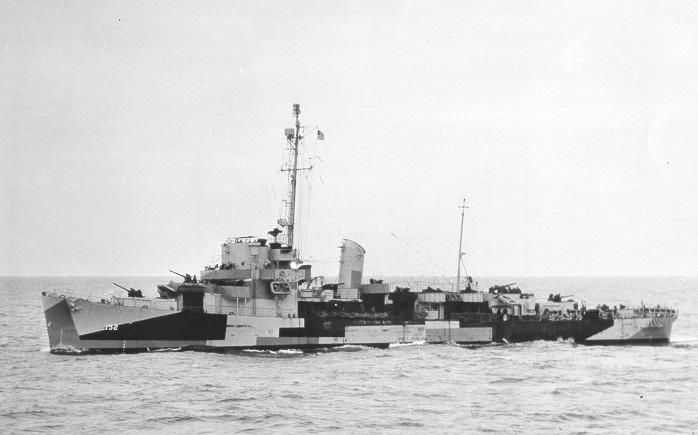
Most of the CU and UC convoys were screened by an escort division (CortDiv) of six destroyer escorts like USS Peterson. Peterson teamed with USS Joyce and USS Gandy to sink U-550 after the submarine torpedoed the tanker Pan-Pennsylvania from convoy CU 21.

Nine tankers departed Curaçao as convoy CU 1 on 20 March 1943 and arrived in Liverpool on 1 April. Additional sailings from Curaçao were CU 2 in June, CU 3 in July, CU 4 in September, and CU 6 in November. Convoy CU 5 was the first to originate in New York on 13 October 1943. Approximately three or four CU convoys sailed from New York each month from December 1943 through May 1945. Convoys CU 23, CU 24, CU 28, CU 30, CU 33, and CU 35 included troopships and are sometimes identified with a TCU prefix. Convoy CU 24 sailed in two sections with troopships in TCU 24A and ammunition ships in TCU 24B.

A total of 2255 ships crossed the Atlantic in CU convoys until convoy CU 73 made the last departure from New York on 30 May 1945.

Submarines sank three loaded United States tankers from CU convoys:

- U-311 torpedoed Seakay in convoy CU 17 on 19 March 1944.
- U-550 torpedoed Pan-Pennsylvania in convoy CU 21 on 16 April 1944.
- U-482 torpedoed Jacksonville in convoy CU 36 on 30 August 1944.

== Ballasted empty ships westbound ==
Empty ships travelling westbound on similar routes were designated UC convoys. Seventeen ballasted tankers departed from Liverpool on 15 February 1943 as convoy UC 1 with fifteen fast freighters, escorted by the modern American destroyers Madison, Lansdale, Hilary P. Jones, and Charles F. Hughes, and the British 42nd Escort Group: sloops Folkestone and Weston, River-class frigates Exe and Ness, Town-class destroyer Bradford, and Banff-class sloops Gorleston and Totland. This was the only UC convoy successfully attacked by submarines.

On 23 February, the 8882-ton Athelprincess was sunk by U-186, and U-202 sank the 7989-ton Esso Baton Rouge and damaged the 9811-ton Empire Norseman, 8482-ton British Fortitude, and 8252-ton Murena. Empire Norseman was later sunk by U-558, but the other two reached Guantánamo. The surviving tankers arrived in Curaçao on 6 March and the freighters proceeded to South African and Indian Ocean destinations.

Additional sailings direct to Curaçao were UC 2 in April, UC 3 in June, UC 3A in July, and UC 4 in September. Convoy UC 5 Departed Liverpool 29 October 1943 as the first of the series routed to New York. Convoy UC 37 reached New York on 23 September 1944. Most subsequent convoys of the series sailed in two sections. Convoy UC 38A left Liverpool on 19 September 1944, and convoy UC 38B departed 4 days later. Convoy UC 71 departed Liverpool on 3 June 1945 as the last of the series.
