= USCGC Itasca (1929) =

1929 Banff-class sloop

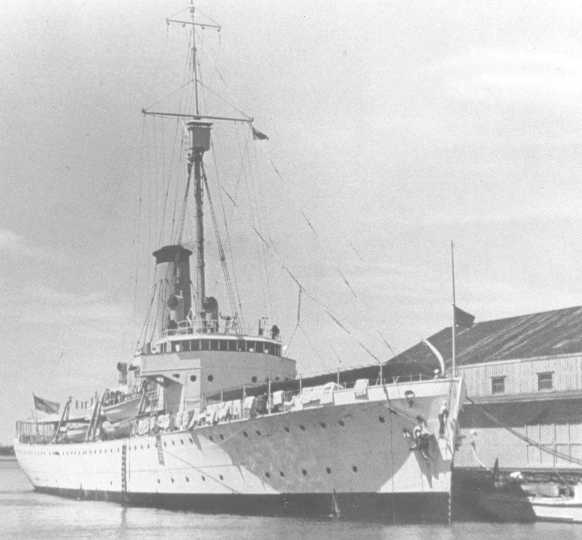
- USCGC Itasca (1929)

History

United States
- Name: USCGC Itasca
- Namesake: Lake Itasca
- Builder: General Engineering & Dry Dock Company, Alameda, California
- Launched: 16 November 1929
- Commissioned: 12 July 1930
- Decommissioned: 30 May 1941
- Fate: transferred to Royal Navy under Lend-Lease
- Ship returned: 23 April 1946
- Stricken: 28 September 1950
- Fate: Sold for scrap, 4 October 1950
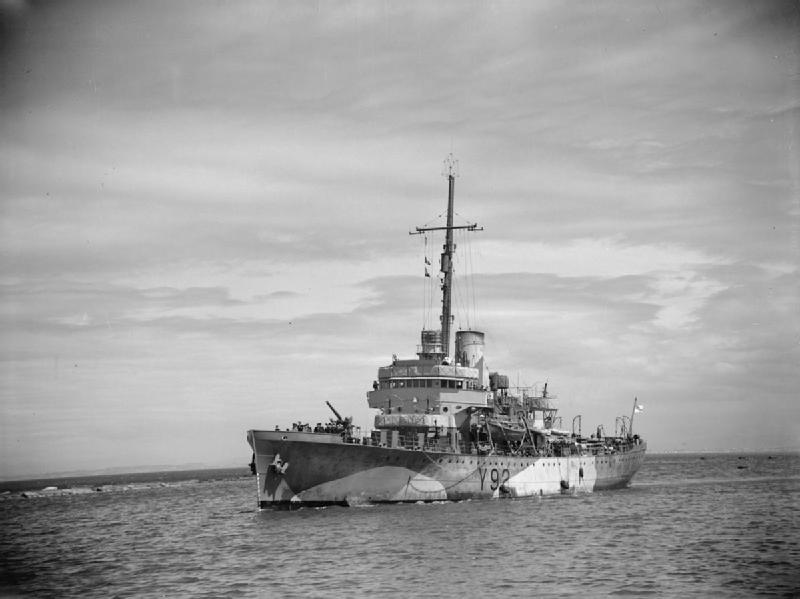
- HMS Gorleston

United Kingdom
- Name: HMS Gorleston
- Namesake: Gorleston
- Commissioned: 30 May 1941
- Decommissioned: 23 April 1946
- Fate: returned to U.S. Coast Guard

General characteristics
- Class & type: Lake-class cutter (USCG); Banff-class sloop (RN)
- Displacement: 2,075 long tons (2,108 t)
- Length: 250 ft (76 m)
- Propulsion: 1 × General Electric turbine-driven 3,350 shp (2,500 kW) electric motor, 2 boilers
- Speed: 17.5 knots (32.4 km/h; 20.1 mph) maximum
- Complement: 97 (in 1940)
- Armament: As Gorleston; 1 × 5 inch gun; 2 × 8 depth charges on stern racks; 2 × 20 mm Oerlikon; 10 × .50 BMG machine guns

USCGC Itasca was a Lake-class cutter of the United States Coast Guard launched on 16 November 1929 and commissioned 12 July 1930. It acted as "picket ship" supporting Amelia Earhart's 1937 world flight attempt, and was the last vessel in radio contact with her and Fred Noonan as they were supposed to be reaching Howland Island in the Pacific. In 1941, it was transferred to the United Kingdom and served as a convoy escort in World War II as HMS Gorleston.

== Career ==
In United States Coast Guard (USCG) service, Itasca performed Bering Sea patrols.

In 1934 it was used to settle the first wave of colonists that were involved in the American Equatorial Islands Colonization Project.

It is most remembered as the "picket ship" that would provide air navigation and radio links for Amelia Earhart and Fred Noonan when Earhart made her 1937 attempt to fly around the world. Itasca, stationed at Howland Island, tried to keep in radio contact with her but radio reception was intermittent. On 2 July 1937 Itasca received the last transmission from Earhart's aircraft and after receiving no further messages she assumed that the aircraft had gone into the ocean. Itasca immediately headed to the area of the last radio transmission and started search operations northward of Howland Island. Itasca and other Navy and Coast Guard vessels continued the search operation in the area until 16 July when the search was called off.

Itasca was decommissioned on lend lease to the United Kingdom where she received a name change, becoming HMS Gorleston (Y92) after the East Anglian port of Gorleston on 30 May 1941. Gorleston was equipped with Type 286M radar after arrival in England; and was assigned to the 40th Escort Group escorting trade convoys between England and Sierra Leone with sister ships HMS Landguard and HMS Lulworth, Lend-Lease destroyer HMS Stanley and Shoreham-class sloop HMS Bideford. After escorting convoys OS 4, SL 87, OS 10, SL 93, OS 12, SL 95, OS 17, SL 100, OS 22, SL 106, OS 28, SL 112, OS 34 and SL 118 on this eastern Atlantic route, Gorleston made a trip to Iceland escorting convoys DS 33 and SD 33, and escorted convoys KMF 3, MKF 3, KMF 5, MKF 5, KMF 7 and MKF 7 between England and the Mediterranean Sea in support of Operation Torch.

Gorleston was then assigned to the 42nd Escort Group with sister ship HMS Totland, River-class frigates HMS Ness and HMS Exe, and sloops HMS Weston and HMS Folkestone escorting tanker convoys UC 1 and CU 1. Gorleston then resumed escorting eastern Atlantic and Mediterranean convoys until refit in Wales in December 1943. After refit, Gorleston escorted eastern Mediterranean convoys from March 1944 until assigned to the Kilindini Escort Force in August 1944. Gorleston escorted Arabian Sea convoys until transferred to Colombo in June 1945. Gorleston spent the remainder of the war escorting Bay of Bengal convoys in support of Operation Zipper.

Gorleston was returned to the United States on 23 April 1946 and re-designated USCGC Itasca until scrapped in 1950.

== See also ==
- Air navigation
- List of United States Coast Guard cutters
- Radio navigation
- S meter / Signal strength
