= Hilary P. Jones =

United States Navy admiral

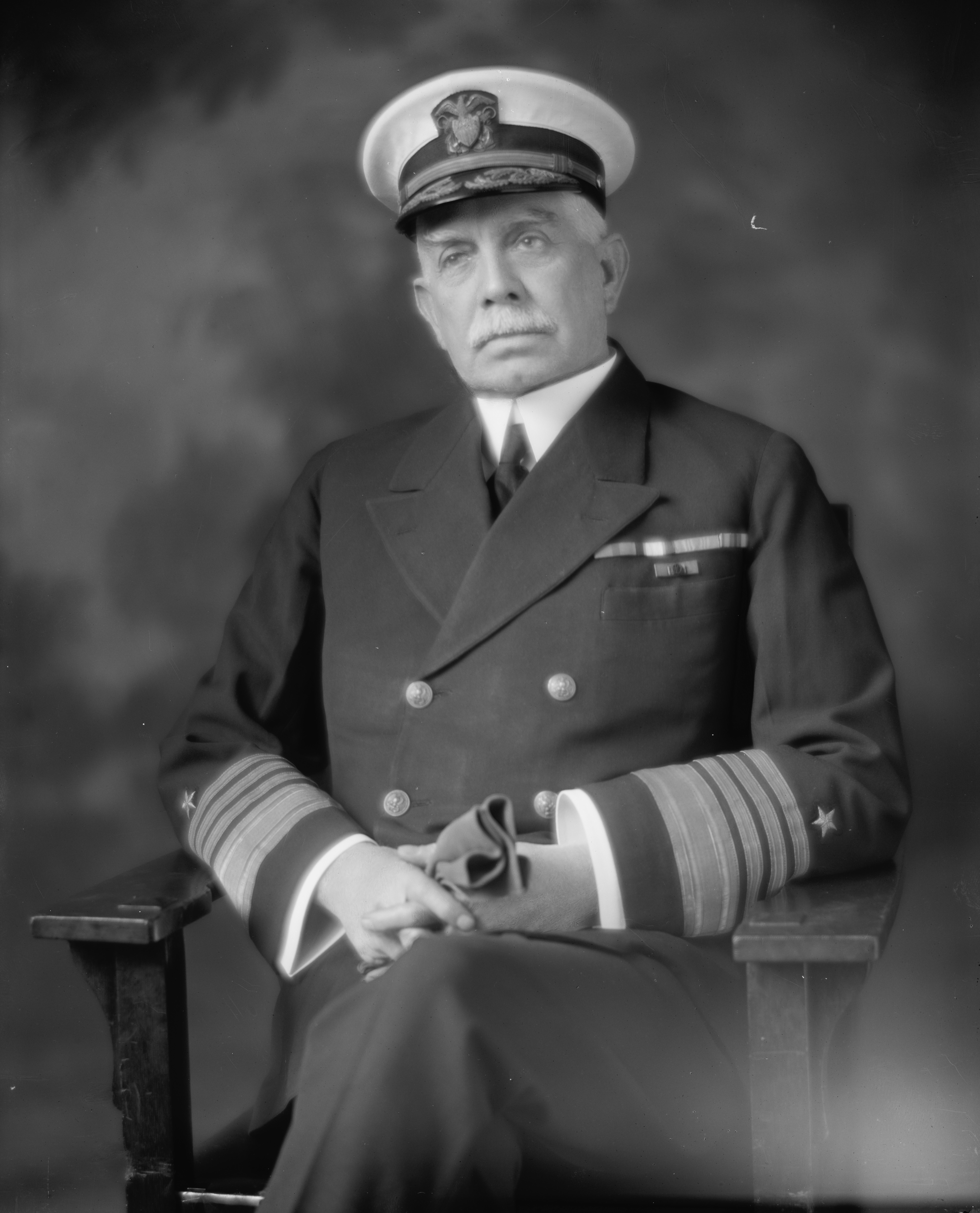
- Born: 14 November 1863; Hanover County, Virginia, U.S.
- Died: 1 January 1938 (aged 74)
- Allegiance: United States
- Branch: United States Navy
- Service years: 1884–1927
- Rank: Admiral
- Commands: U.S. Fleet
- Conflicts: Spanish–American War; World War I
- Awards: Distinguished Service Medal
- Other work: Naval advisor: Geneva Disarmament Conferencef; London Naval Conference 1930

Hilary Pollard Jones, Jr. (14 November 1863 – 1 January 1938) was an officer in the United States Navy during the Spanish–American War and World War I. During the early 1920s, he served as Commander in Chief, United States Fleet.

== Early life and career ==
Jones was born in Hanover County, Virginia on 14 November 1863. His father was Hilary Pollard Jones, Sr. (1833–1913), who was a Colonel of artillery in the Army of Northern Virginia during the American Civil War.

Jones graduated from the United States Naval Academy in 1884. As a young Ensign, Hilary Jones was commended for his bravery and skill in helping to save Nipsic from sinking during the great Samoan hurricane of 1889.

During the Spanish–American War Jones served on Dorothea on patrol duty off Cuba. In the next years he sailed in various ships of the fleet, rising to command the battleship Rhode Island in 1912. In 1913 he assumed command of the Washington Navy Yard.

== World War I and post-war years ==
During World War I Jones commanded patrol units and later a division of the Transport Force. He received the Distinguished Service Medal for his outstanding service.

Following the war Admiral Jones had important commands at sea, culminating in 1922 in the post of Commander in Chief, United States Fleet. In 1923 he left this duty to join the Navy General Board.

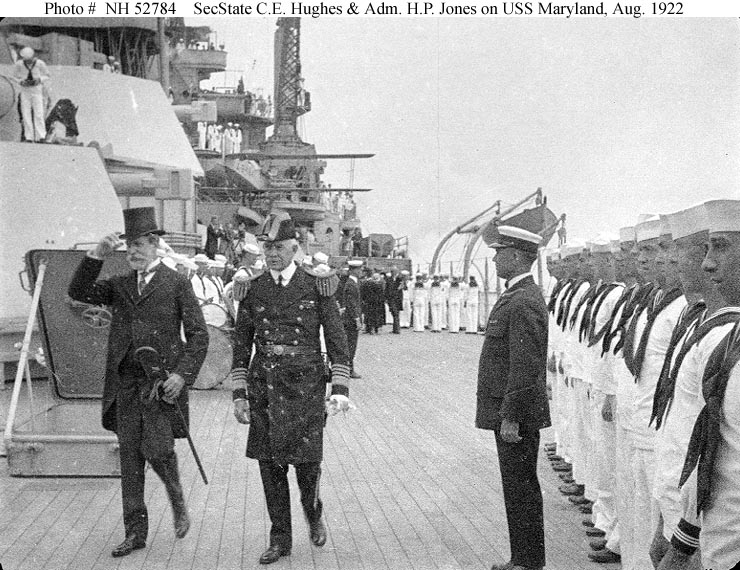
With Secretary of State Charles Hughes in 1922

== Retirement ==
Admiral Jones retired in 1927 but served as naval advisor at the Geneva Naval Conference, and then the London Naval Conference 1930. He was a prominent member of the Virginia Society of the Society of the Cincinnati, representing Supreme Court Chief Justice John Marshall, and served as its president from 1924 to 1926.

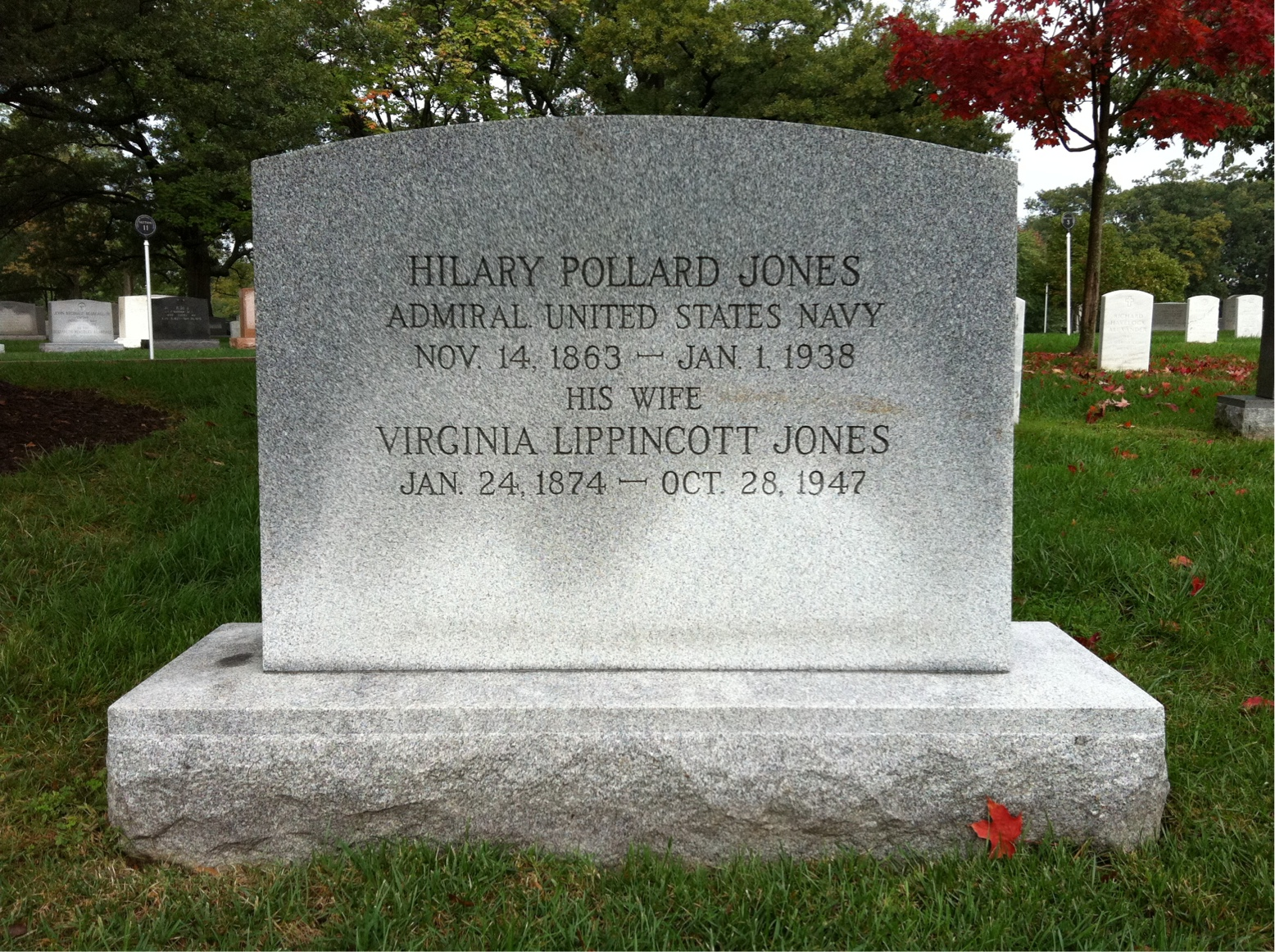
Grave of Jones at Arlington National Cemetery

Admiral Jones died 1 January 1938.

== Namesake ==
The destroyer USS Hilary P. Jones was named for him.

Military offices
Preceded by none	Commander in Chief, United States Fleet; 1922–1923	Succeeded by Robert Coontz
