= USS Benson =

Benson-class destroyer

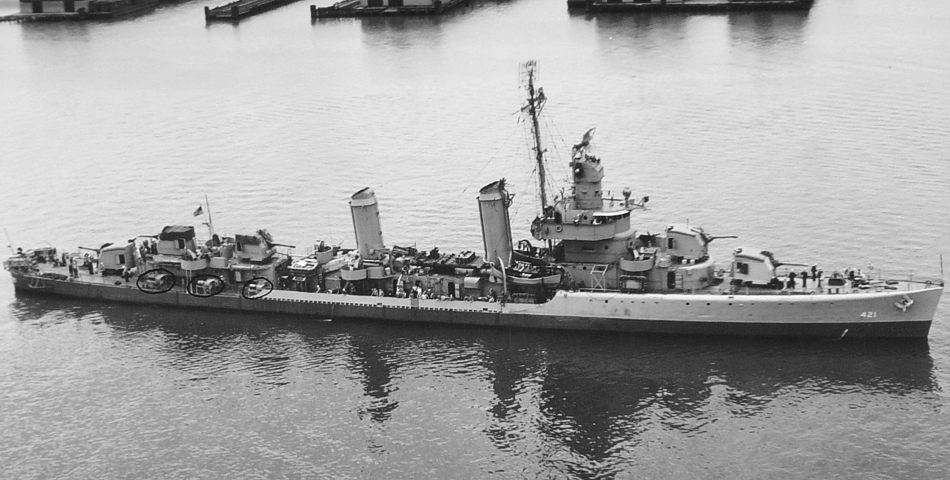
- USS Benson (DD-421)

History

United States
- Name: USS Benson (DD-421)
- Namesake: William S. Benson
- Ordered: 1938
- Builder: Fore River Shipyard
- Laid down: 16 May 1938
- Launched: 15 November 1939
- Commissioned: 25 July 1940
- Decommissioned: 18 March 1946
- Fate: transferred to Republic of China, 26 February 1954
- Stricken: 1 November 1974

Republic of China
- Name: Lo Yang (DD-14)
- Acquired: 26 February 1954
- Stricken: 1975
- Fate: Broken up for scrap

General characteristics
- Class & type: Benson-class destroyer
- Displacement: 1620 tons (2515 tons full load)
- Length: 341 ft (104 m) waterline, 348 ft 2 in (106.12 m) overall
- Beam: 36 ft 1 in (11.00 m)
- Draft: 11 ft 9 in (3.58 m) (normal), 17 ft 9 in (5.41 m) (full load)
- Propulsion: four Babcock & Wilcox boilers, General Electric SR geared turbines; two shafts; 50000 shp (37 MW)
- Speed: 37.5 knots (69 km/h); 33 knots (61 km/h) full load
- Range: 6,000 nautical miles at 15 kt; (11,000 km at 28 km/h)
- Complement: 208 (276 war)
- Armament: 5 × 5 in (127 mm) DP guns, 6 × 0.50 in. (12.7 mm) guns, 10 × 21 in (53 cm) torpedo tubes, 2 × depth charge tracks

USS Benson (DD-421) was the lead ship of her class of destroyers in the United States Navy during World War II. She was named for Admiral William S. Benson (1855–1932).

Benson was laid down on 16 May 1938 at Quincy, Mass., by the Bethlehem Steel Co.; launched on 15 November 1939; sponsored by Mrs. William S. Benson, the widow of Adm. Benson; and commissioned on 25 July 1940.

== 1940–1941 ==
Following fitting out at the Boston Navy Yard, the destroyer made a short cruise to Portland, Maine, before departing Boston on 22 August and heading – via Newport, Rhode Island, and Yorktown, Virginia – for Guantanamo Bay, Cuba, and abbreviated shakedown training. She sailed for the Chesapeake Bay on 3 September and – after visits to Quantico, Virginia, and Washington, D.C. – departed Norfolk, on the 13th and proceeded via Guantanamo Bay to Cayenne, French Guiana, where she arrived on the 21st to check on the possibility of Axis activity in that French colony and its Dutch neighbor, Suriname. This effort seemed necessary to keep fascism out of the Americas and to protect a rich source of bauxite ore, the source of aluminum, for Allied war production. On the 27th, the colony's governor embarked in the destroyer for a visit to Îles du Salut, some seven or eight miles off the coast. He returned to Cayenne later that day and disembarked before the ship sailed for Paramaribo, Suriname. Benson departed Cayenne for the third time on 6 October and proceeded via San Juan, Puerto Rico, to the New York Navy Yard where she underwent a post-shakedown overhaul that lasted through mid-November.

Benson stood out of New York Harbor on 18 November to begin the neutrality patrols that constituted her main concern well into the following spring. A highlight of this period of her service came in March 1941 when she escorted USS Potomac (AG-25) while the yacht carried President Franklin D. Roosevelt to the Bahamas for a holiday of fishing. Late in May, the destroyer helped to screen USS Texas (BB-35) as the battleship patrolled the North Atlantic. While they were at sea, the German battleship Bismarck got underway on 21 May and headed for the Denmark Strait, hoping to prey on Allied convoys. When Prime Minister Winston Churchill learned of her foray, he asked President Roosevelt to have the American Navy look for the raider and to keep the Royal Navy informed of developments during the search. Once alerted, Texas and her consorts scoured the seas for Bismarck until the British sank the German warship on 27 May.

Soon thereafter, Benson returned to the Boston Navy Yard for a month's availability to prepare for a new mission. She got underway on 28 June to join Task Force 19 (TF 19) which was being formed to carry marines to Iceland to free the British troops who had been guarding that island for more active service. Task Force 19 departed Argentia, Newfoundland, on 1 July and, at the end of a passage through U-boat-infested waters, anchored in Reykjavík on the evening of 7 July. After returning to Boston, Benson quickly refueled and moved to Casco Bay for exercises off Portland, Maine. In September, she began almost seven months of duty shuttling between Boston and Iceland escorting convoys. Three months later, in December, the Japanese attack on Pearl Harbor and Adolf Hitler's declaration of war allowed the United States to drop the last pretense of neutrality and prosecute the war against the Axis openly.

== 1942–1943 ==
At the end of March 1942, Benson got underway to escort a convoy all the way eastward to Londonderry Port, Northern Ireland, and returned to Boston early in May. Convoy escort operations – which took her to the British Isles, Bermuda, and the Panama Canal Zone – continued to be her main duty into the autumn when she began readying herself for Operation Torch, the invasion of French North Africa. As a part of those preparations, she took part in shore-bombardment exercises with the new battleship Massachusetts (BB-59). En route to Casco Bay, Maine, for one of these rehearsals in the pre-dawn darkness of 19 October, she collided with Trippe (DD-403), killing four and wounding three of the latter's crewmen when her bow pierced Trippe's starboard quarter. The accident also caused enough damage to Benson to keep her in the New York Navy Yard undergoing repairs until after Allied troops had invaded North Africa.

When she was again ready for action, Benson resumed convoy-escort duty across the North Atlantic and in the Mediterranean. In July 1943, she turned her attention to supporting the invasion of Sicily. She sailed from Oran, Algeria, on the 6th with Task Group 80.2 (TG 80.2), the escort group of Vice Admiral H. Kent Hewitt's Western Naval Task Force, and escorted convoy NCS-1 to the assault area at Gela, Sicily. She arrived off the beaches there several hours before dawn on the night of 9–10 July and spent the next two days in the antiaircraft screen fighting off almost incessant raids by Luftwaffe warplanes. On the 11th, a bomb exploded close aboard the destroyer wounding 18 of her crewmen, but inflicting only superficial damage to the ship. The next day, she set out to escort the attack cargo ship Betelgeuse (AKA-11) to Algiers where she arrived on the 18th.

More patrol and escort duty in the Mediterranean followed until 24 August, when Benson joined TF-81 in final preparations for landing on the mainland of Italy. At dawn on 9 September, the Allied troops went ashore on Salerno's beaches and met fierce opposition while the Luftwaffe struck continuously at the warships of the invaders. At mid-morning on 11 September, a Dornier Do 217 warplane released a radio-controlled glide bomb which struck the No. 3 turret of Savannah (CL-42) and pierced through the light cruiser until it exploded in her lower ammunition handling room, opening seams in the ship's hull and tearing a large hole in her bottom. Valiant and efficient damage control parties stemmed the stricken cruiser's flooding, corrected her list, extinguished her fires, and enabled her to resume moving under her own power. Benson then helped to escort Savannah to Malta for temporary repairs that enabled her to return to the United States for permanent patching.

Benson soon returned to Salerno, rejoined the antiaircraft screen, and – on the morning of 19 September – shot down an Fw 190 fighter-bomber. While supporting ground operations in Italy, she also conducted numerous shore bombardment missions and escorted other ships to various Mediterranean ports. On 2 October, she rescued the survivors from a downed Royal Air Force "Wellington" bomber.

== 1944–1945 ==
At the end of January 1944, the destroyer departed Casablanca, Morocco, and escorted Convoy GUS-28 to New York where she entered the navy yard for an overhaul. Then, following training exercises along the east coast, she got underway with TG 27.4 on 20 April and proceeded to Oran where she arrived on 1 May. After upkeep, she headed for Gibraltar on the 9th with Convoy UGS-40. Two days later, she helped to fight off an attack by about 30 German planes, shooting down two Junkers Ju 88 bombers, probably destroying a third, and damaging two others. No ship from the convoy was lost or damaged.

In the months that followed, Benson continued to escort convoys and individual ships between various Mediterranean ports. In mid-August 1944, she joined TG 80.6 to help screen other warships involved in the invasion of southern France. She also served as a traffic control vessel during that operation and, from time to time, took part in the bombardment of German positions ashore. While on patrol duty in a fire-support area near Toulon, the destroyer blockaded enemy merchant ships in San Remo harbor and fired on supply buildings in the vicinity. She also supported the French cruisers Montcalm and Jeanne d'Arc during their bombardment of San Remo. Early in January 1945, she sailed to Livorno, Italy, to shell German troops threatening to break through there. During this duty, she was attacked by enemy small combatants, either German E-boats or Italian MAS boats, but escaped injury and later escorted the French cruiser Georges Leygues in her bombardment of enemy-held shipyards in Pietra Ligure.

== Pacific service ==
Detached from this duty late in January 1945, Benson returned to the United States for yard repairs and training during February. After a convoy-escort run to Plymouth, England, in April, the destroyer received orders to the Pacific. Accordingly, she transited the Panama Canal on 12 May and reached Pearl Harbor on the 29th. The destroyer spent a bit more than a month in Hawaiian waters and then got underway on 14 June to escort aircraft carriers USS Lexington (CV-16), USS Cowpens (CVL-25) and USS Hancock (CV-19) in their air strikes against Wake Island. Then, following upkeep at Leyte in the Philippines, she proceeded to Ulithi. Until V-J Day on 15 August, the warship performed convoy and patrol duty between Ulithi and Okinawa. She transferred released American PoWs from Hakodaye, Hokkaido, together with HMS Barfleur for British and Commonwealth PoWs, to Tokyo Bay for recovery and transport home. She served in the screen for the first occupation troops for Yokohama, who landed on 2 and 3 September 1945.

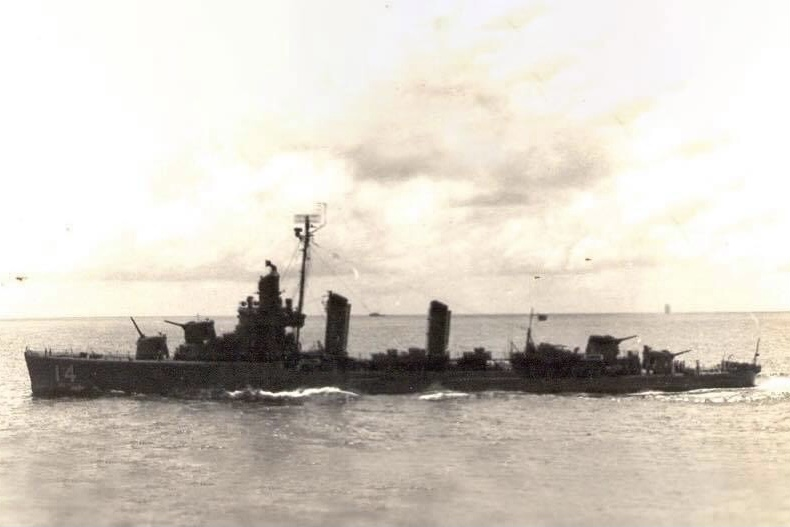
Lo Yang underway, date unknown

In the two months following the surrender of Japan, the destroyer escorted five different convoy groups between the Philippines and Tokyo Bay. Ordered back to the United States for inactivation, Benson got underway from Yokohama on 4 November 1945 and moored at the Charleston Navy Yard, on 6 December. She was decommissioned there on 18 March 1946, placed in reserve, and assigned to the Charleston Group of the Atlantic Reserve Fleet.

Benson (DD-421) earned four battle stars for her World War II service.

As of 2023, no other ship in the United States Navy has been named Benson.

=== Service in the Republic of China Navy ===
On 26 February 1954, Benson was transferred to the government of the Republic of China, and she served the Republic of China Navy as Lo Yang (DD-14) into the mid-1970s. As the result of a survey made of her early in 1974, they replaced her with another American destroyer that the Navy loaned them in 1975, the former USS Taussig (DD-746), which then became Lo Yang (DD-14). Meanwhile, Benson's name was struck from the Naval Vessel Register on 1 November 1974.

== Convoys escorted ==
Convoy	Escort Group	Dates	Notes
	task force 19	1–7 July 1941	occupation of Iceland prior to US declaration of war
ON 20		30 Sept-9 Oct 1941	from Iceland to Newfoundland prior to US declaration of war; 1 ship torpedoed
HX 156		24 Oct-1 Nov 1941	from Newfoundland to Iceland prior to US declaration of war; Reuben James sunk
ON 34		12–21 Nov 1941	44 ships escorted without loss from Iceland to Newfoundland prior to US declaration of war
HX 163		5–15 Dec 1941	43 ships escorted without loss from Newfoundland to Iceland; war declared while escorting convoy
ON 47		22–23 Dec 1941	23 ships escorted without loss from Iceland to Newfoundland
HX 176	MOEF group A1	23 Feb-5 March 1942	24 ships escorted without loss from Newfoundland to Northern Ireland
ON 75	MOEF group A1	11–19 March 1942	12 ships escorted without loss from Northern Ireland to Newfoundland
HX 183	MOEF group A1	6–14 April 1942	23 ships escorted without loss from Newfoundland to Northern Ireland
ON 89	MOEF group A1	24 April-2 May 1942	49 ships escorted without loss from Northern Ireland to Newfoundland
AT 16		31 May-2 June 1942	5 troopships escorted without loss from New York City to Halifax Harbour
AT 18		6–17 Aug 1942	12 troopships escorted without loss from New York City to Firth of Clyde
GUF 2		29 November-11 December 1942	18 ships escorted without loss from Mediterranean Sea to Chesapeake Bay
UGS 4		13 January-2 February 1943	48 ships escorted without loss from Chesapeake Bay to Mediterranean Sea
GUS 4		23 February-12 March 1943	49 ships escorted without loss from Mediterranean Sea to Chesapeake Bay
UGF 8A		10–23 May 1943	14 ships escorted without loss from Chesapeake Bay to Mediterranean Sea
UGS 8A		2 June 1943	80 ships escorted without loss from Chesapeake Bay to Mediterranean Sea
GUS 28		26 January-15 February 1944	66 ships escorted without loss from Mediterranean Sea to Chesapeake Bay
GUF 19		24 January-5 February 1945	4 ships escorted without loss from Mediterranean Sea to Chesapeake Bay

== Notes ==
=== Sources ===
- Lenton, H. T., American Fleet and Escort Destroyers. Garden City, NY: Doubleday & Co, 1971.
