= USRC Andrew Johnson =

Ship of the U.S. Revenue Cutter Service

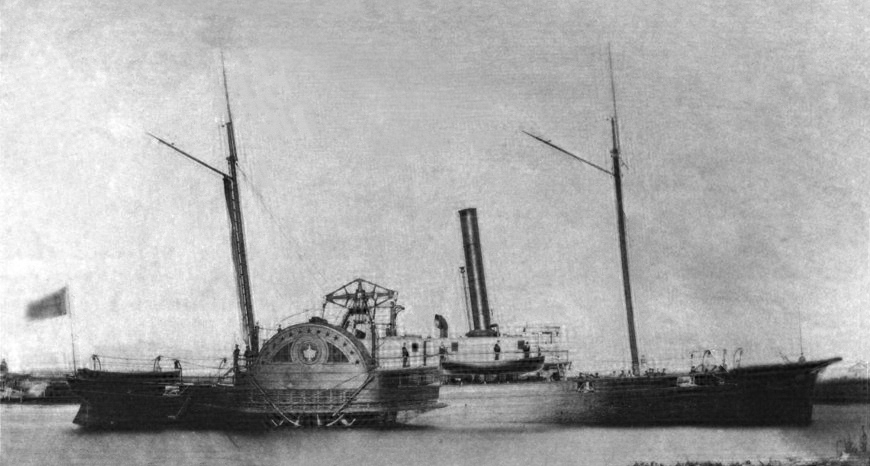

History

United States
- Name: USRC Andrew Johnson
- Ordered: 1865
- Builder: J & R Gray, Buffalo, New York
- Laid down: 1865
- Launched: 1865
- Commissioned: 1 May 1865
- Decommissioned: 1897
- Stricken: 1897: unknown after use by the Ohio Naval Militia
- Fate: Sold, later purchased by the US Navy for the Ohio Naval Militia, unknown after this

General characteristics
- Class & type: Chase-class cutter
- Displacement: 500 tons
- Length: 172 ft (52 m)
- Beam: 26.25 ft (8.00 m)
- Draft: 10 ft (3.0 m)
- Propulsion: Sail/steam (Side wheels; single walking-beam steam engine)
- Complement: 40
- Armament: 3 × 4-pounders; 1 × 30-pounder; 2 × 24-pounders

Between 1865 and 1866, five cutters of the Chase Class were constructed for the Revenue Cutter Service. These cutters were named: Chase, Fessenden, Johnson, McCulloch and Sherman. They were wooden-hulled side-wheel steamers and powered by walking-beam steam engines. Their hulls were constructed with iron diagonal bracing for added strength. They were designed for operations on the Great Lakes. However, the McCulloch served in the Gulf of Mexico and the Atlantic.

The revenue cutter Andrew Johnson, also known as simply Johnson, was commissioned on 1 May 1865 for service on the Great Lakes. She was based out of Milwaukee, Wisconsin, for her entire Revenue Cutter Service career. During the navigation season, the Johnson patrolled the waters of the Great Lakes. In the winter months, usually late November to May, she was laid up.

She was rebuilt in Manitowoc, Wisconsin, in 1879, with two feet being added to her beam. She was placed out of service and sold to Charles E. Benham for $2,250 in May, 1897.

She was later purchased by the Ohio Naval Militia, predecessor of the Naval Reserve, and used for training.
