= USS Hilary P. Jones =

Benson-class destroyer

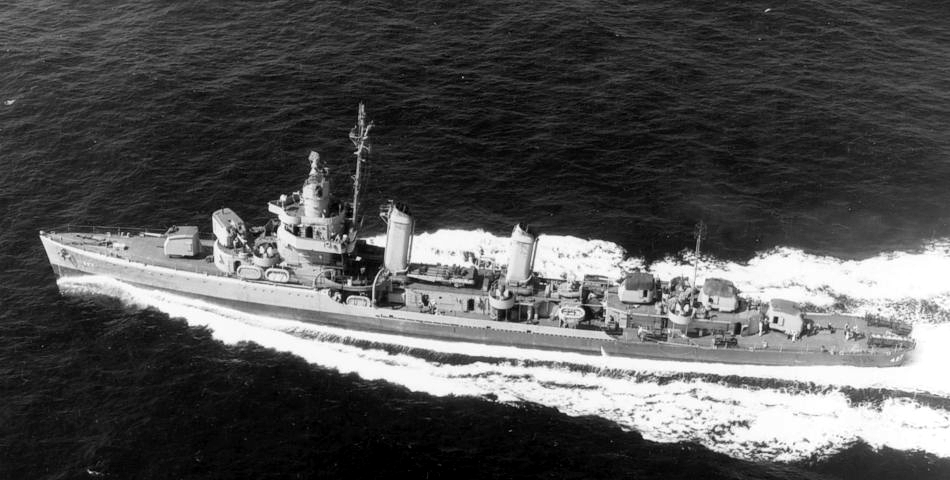
- USS Hilary P. Jones (DD-427)

History

United States
- Name: Hilary P. Jones
- Namesake: Hilary P. Jones
- Builder: Charleston Navy Yard
- Laid down: 16 May 1938
- Launched: 14 December 1939
- Commissioned: 6 September 1940
- Decommissioned: 6 February 1947
- Fate: loaned to Taiwan, 1954

Taiwan
- Name: Han Yang
- Acquired: 26 February 1954
- Identification: Hull number: DD-15
- Fate: Broken up for scrap, 1974

General characteristics
- Class & type: Benson-class destroyer
- Displacement: 1,620 tons
- Length: 348 ft 2 in (106.12 m)
- Beam: 36 ft 1 in (11.00 m)
- Draft: 17 ft 6 in (5.33 m)
- Speed: 36.5 knots (67.6 km/h; 42.0 mph)
- Complement: 276
- Armament: 5 x 5 in (130 mm)/38 guns; 10 x 21 in (533 mm) torpedo tubes

USS Hilary P. Jones (DD-427) was a Benson-class destroyer in the United States Navy during World War II. She was named for Admiral Hilary P. Jones.

Hilary P. Jones was launched by the Charleston Navy Yard 14 December 1939; sponsored by Mrs. Hilary P. Jones, widow of Admiral Jones; and commissioned 6 September 1940 at Charleston Navy Yard.

== World War II Atlantic Service ==
Following shakedown in the mid Atlantic and exercises off Newport, Rhode Island, Hilary P. Jones departed 11 December for duty with the Neutrality Patrol in the Caribbean. She performed escort duties in those waters until 11 March 1941, when she returned to Hampton Roads. Training exercises off New England followed until 28 April, when the destroyer departed New York as a convoy escort. She steamed to Newfoundland, and for the next dangerous months before the attack on Pearl Harbor escorted cargo ships and transports in the North Atlantic. During one of these voyages to Iceland, 31 October 1941, Reuben James, the first naval vessel to be lost in the war, was torpedoed and sunk. Hilary P. Jones rescued 11 survivors of the attack before arriving Reykjavík 3 November.

The destroyer continued the hazardous North Atlantic convoy duty after America's entry into the war, battling both German submarines and the elements to bring troops and supplies to the Allies. Jones transferred to Mediterranean duty in January 1944 as production of escort vessels and frigates allowed the larger destroyers to be used for other assignments. The destroyer departed with her squadron 16 January 1944 to screen Philadelphia off Anzio. She alternated at the bitterly contested Anzio beachhead with convoy duty between there and Naples until 20 March, often exchanging fire with German shore batteries off Anzio. After a brief respite the ship returned to her gunfire support duties at Anzio during April and early May, occasionally engaging in escort and antisubmarine patrol operations. With three escort vessels the destroyer detected and attacked U-516 off Algeria in May 1944, sinking it after a lengthy battle on 17 May.

During June and July, Hilary P. Jones acted as escort ship for Mediterranean convoys and took part in training for the invasion of Southern France. She departed Naples on 13 August in convoy with French and British ships for the invasion, arriving three days later. The destroyer not only provided gunfire support missions during the assault, but also acted as electronic jamming vessel in the successful attempt to prevent radio-controlled bombs from harassing the area. In the weeks that followed she continued to range up and down the coast in support of the First Airborne Task Force destroying bridges, gun emplacements, railroad facilities and coastal vessels. She was attacked by a German E-boat 21 August, but destroyed the craft with gunfire. For her outstanding record during this period the ship received the Navy Unit Commendation.

Detached from her coastal support duties 1 October 1944, the destroyer continued convoy duties in the Mediterranean until returning to New York 12 January 1945. Following overhaul and training off Casco Bay, Maine, she sailed with her last transatlantic convoy 26 February – 9 April 1945. Jones was then designated for Pacific Fleet, and departed New York 24 April for the Panama Canal Zone and Pearl Harbor.

== Convoys escorted ==
Convoy	Escort Group	Dates	Notes
	task force 19	1–7 July 1941	occupation of Iceland prior to US declaration of war
ON 20		30 Sept-9 Oct 1941	from Iceland to Newfoundland prior to US declaration of war
HX 156		24 Oct-1 Nov 1941	from Newfoundland to Iceland prior to US declaration of war
ON 34		12-21 Nov 1941	from Iceland to Newfoundland prior to US declaration of war
HX 163		5-15 Dec 1941	from Newfoundland to Iceland; war declared while convoy was being escorted
ON 47		22-23 Dec 1941	from Iceland to Newfoundland
AT 18		6-17 Aug 1942	troopships from New York City to Firth of Clyde
UC 1		15 Feb-6 March 1943	from Liverpool to Curacao
CU 1		20 March-1 April 1943	from Curacao to Liverpool
UC 2		9–23 April 1943	from Liverpool to Curacao
CU 2		21 May-5 June 1943	from Curacao to Liverpool
UC 3		10–26 June 1943	from Liverpool to Curacao
CU 4		26 Aug-9 Sept 1943	from Curacao to Liverpool
UC 4		15-27 Sept 1943	from Liverpool to Curacao

== Pacific Service ==
Operating at Pearl Harbor from 18 May 1945, until 2 June, she then sailed for the advance base at Ulithi. Upon her arrival 13 June Hilary P. Jones joined the surface patrol forces in the Caroline Islands, making occasional escort voyages to Okinawa. At Ulithi when Japan surrendered, she steamed 18 August to Okinawa, Subic Bay, and then Tokyo. As an escort unit for 8th Army occupation troops, she entered Tokyo Bay 2 September as the surrender document was being executed onboard Missouri. Subsequently, she made two more voyages with occupation groups to Japan before ending her long war service and departed for the United States on 5 November.

== Post World War II, Loan to ROC Navy and fate ==
Hilary P. Jones sailed to Charleston Navy Yard via Pearl Harbor and the Panama Canal and decommissioned there 6 February 1947. She was placed in the Charleston Group, Atlantic Reserve Fleet.

She was loaned to the Republic of China under the Military Assistance Program 26 February 1954. She served the Nationalist Chinese Navy as HanYan (DD-15). She was stricken on 1 November 1974 and broken up for scrap.

== Awards ==
Hilary P. Jones received four battle stars for World War II service, in addition to her Navy Unit Commendation.

As of 2017, no other ship in the United States Navy has been named Hilary P. Jones.
