= Convoy HX 156 =

Convoy HX.156
- Part of World War II
Date	22 October 1941-5 November 1941
Location	North Atlantic

Belligerents
Kriegsmarine	Royal Navy; United States Navy

Commanders and leaders
Admiral Karl Dönitz	Rear-Admiral E W Leir DSO

Strength
	52 merchant ships 16 escorts

Casualties and losses
	1 ship sunk

Convoy HX 156 was the 156th of the numbered series of World War II HX convoys of merchant ships from Halifax, Nova Scotia to Liverpool. Forty-three ships departed Halifax on 22 October 1941, and were met two days later by United States Navy Task Unit 4.1.3 consisting of Gleaves-class destroyer Niblack, Clemson-class destroyer Reuben James, Wickes-class destroyer Tarbell, and Benson-class destroyers Benson and Hilary P. Jones.

== The Action ==
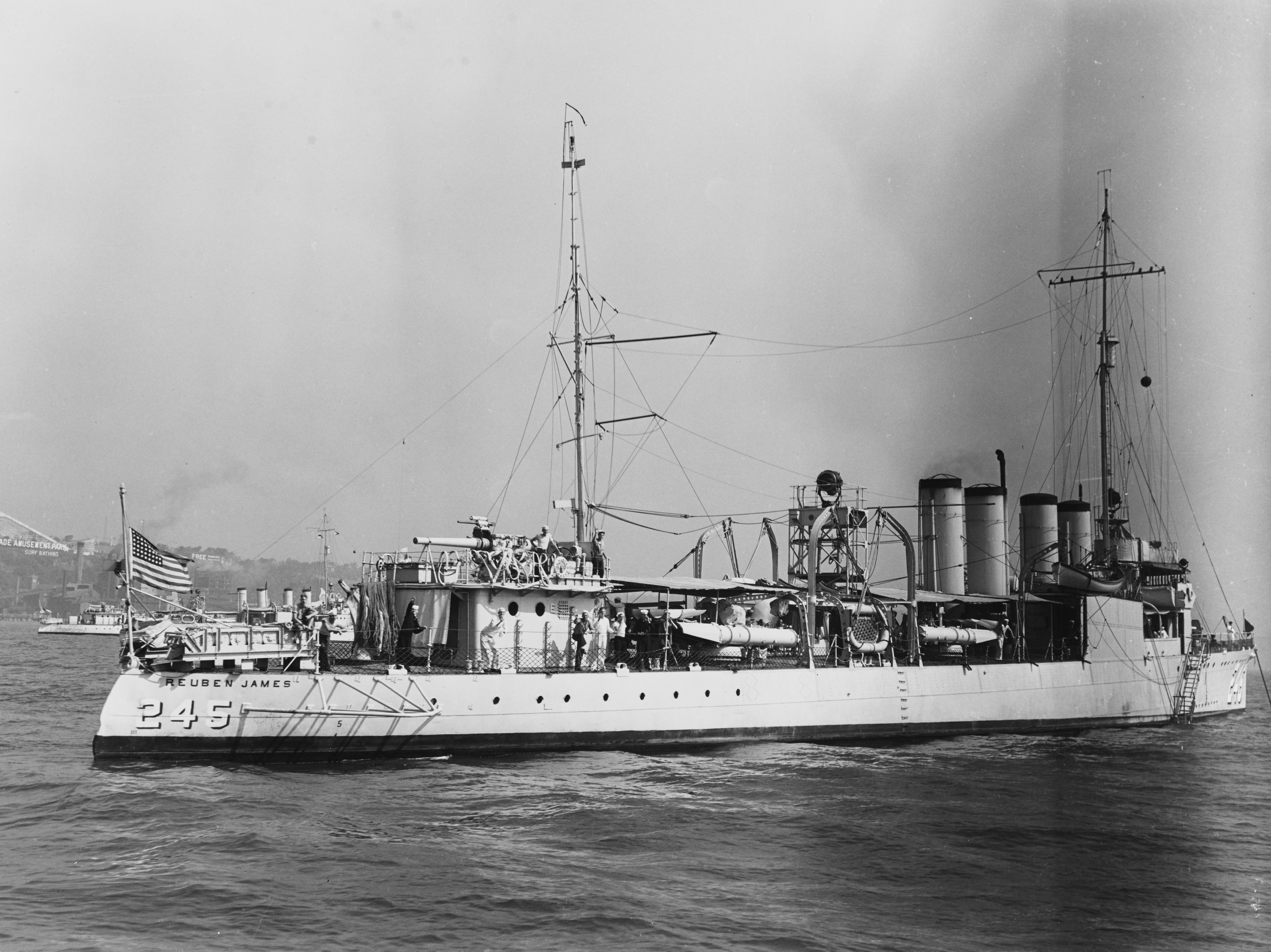
USS Reuben James was the only loss from convoy HX 156

=== 31 October 1941 ===
The German submarine U-552 sighted the convoy at dawn on 31 October 1941, and torpedoed Reuben James as the destroyer approached to investigate the Huff-Duff bearing of the sighting report. A torpedo struck the port side and detonated the forward magazine. The hull aft of the third stack remained afloat for 5 minutes; and 44 men were rescued from the crew of 159.

Reuben James was the first United States warship sunk during World War II. U-552 was driven off by the escort; but U-567 found the convoy that afternoon.

=== 1 November 1941 ===
Task Unit 4.1.3 handed the convoy off to the British 6th Escort Group on 1 November 1941.
U-552 and U-567 made two unsuccessful torpedo attacks on 1 November and maintained contact with the convoy through 3 November. Empire Foam launched her Hawker Sea Hurricane to intercept a Focke-Wulf Fw 200 Condor aircraft, which it chased off. The Hurricane pilot was rescued by HMS Broke after ditching his aircraft. The convoy reached Liverpool on 5 November.

== Ships in the convoy ==
These ships were members of Convoy HX 156.

Name	Flag	Tonnage (GRT)	Notes
Alchiba (1920)	Netherlands	4,427	Iceland
Ancylus (1935)	United Kingdom	8,017	Oil tanker. Onward To N Russia
Anna Knudsen (1931)	Norway	9,057	
Arabian Prince (1936)	United Kingdom	1,960	4 Passengers
Athelvictor (1941)	United Kingdom	8,410	
Benmacdhui (1911)	United Kingdom	6,869	
Brabant (1938)	Belgium	2,483	2 Passengers
Bralanta (1936)	Norway	9,608	
British Governor (1926)	United Kingdom	6,840	Scapa Flow
Cape Breton (1940)	United Kingdom	6,044	
Charlbury (1940)	United Kingdom	4,836	
Chepo (1919)	Panama	5,707	Returned, See Convoy HX 158
Clan Macquarrie (1913)	United Kingdom	6,471	
Comanchee (1936)	United Kingdom	6,837	
Delilian (1923)	United Kingdom	6,423	
Edam (1921)	Netherlands	8,871	27 Passengers
Eidanger (1938)	Norway	9,432	
El Capitan (1917)	Panama	5,255	Onward To N Russia
El Estero (1920)	Panama	4,219	
Empire Confidence (1935)	United Kingdom	5,023	12 Passengers
Empire Day (1941)	United Kingdom	7,242	CAM ship
Empire Foam (1941)	United Kingdom	7,047	CAM ship
Empire Rainbow (1941)	United Kingdom	6,942	CAM ship
Empire Tern (1919)	United Kingdom	2,479	
Gallia (1939)	Norway	9,974	
Ganymedes (1917)	Netherlands	2,682	
Gudrun Maersk (1937)	United Kingdom	2,294	Iceland to Belfast
K G Meldahl (1938)	Norway	3,799	
Kollbjorg (1937)	Norway	8,259	
Leiv Eiriksson I (1936)	Norway	9,952	Ex-Iceland
Leonatus (1938)	Panama	2,242	
Lewant (1930)	Poland	1,942	2 Passengers
Maihar (1917)	United Kingdom	7,563	1 Passenger
Markhor (1929)	United Kingdom	7,917	
Mergus (1906)	Sweden	1,368	Iceland to Clyde
Munin (1899)	Norway	1,285	Iceland To Clyde
Nestor (1913)	United Kingdom	14,629	197 Passengers
Norefjord (1920)	Norway	3,082	
O A Knudsen (1938)	Norway	11,007	
Polar Chief (1897)	United Kingdom	8,040	
Prince De Liege (1938)	Belgium	2,588	
Prins Willem Van Oranje (1938)	Netherlands	1,303	
San Alvaro (1935)	United Kingdom	7,385	4 Passengers
San Arcadio (1935)	United Kingdom	7,419	1 Passenger
San Emiliano (1939)	United Kingdom	8,071	4 Passengers
Sandanger (1938)	Norway	9,432	
Skaraas (1936)	Norway	9,826	
Sourabaya (1915)	United Kingdom	10,107	28 Passengers
Stanlake (1923)	United Kingdom	1,742	Possibly joined this convoy
Svanholm (1922)	United Kingdom	1,321	
Troubadour (1920)	Norway	5,808	6 Passengers
HMCS Annapolis (I04)	Royal Canadian Navy		Escort 22 – 24 Oct, Destroyer
USS Alchiba (AKA-6) (1939)	United States	6,198	to Reykjavik, Armed 'Attack cargo ship'
USS Benson (DD-421)	United States Navy		Escort 24 Oct – 1 Nov, Destroyer
USS Hilary P. Jones (DD-427)	United States Navy		Escort 24 Oct – 1 Nov, Destroyer
USS Niblack (DD-424)	United States Navy		Escort 24 Oct – 1 Nov, Destroyer
USS Reuben James (DD-245)	United States Navy		Escort 24 Oct, sunk by U-552 on 31 Oct 41 (prior to US declaration of war)
USS Tarbell (DD-142)	United States Navy		Escort 24 Oct – 1 Nov, Destroyer
HMS Verity (D63)	Royal Navy		Escort 31 Oct – 4 Nov, Destroyer
HMS Wolverine (D78)	Royal Navy		Escort 31 Oct – 4 Nov, Destroyer
HMS Camellia (K31)	Royal Navy		Escort 31 Oct – 4 Nov, Corvette
HMS Larkspur	Royal Navy		Escort 31 Oct – 5 Nov, Corvette
HNoMS Montbretia	Royal Norwegian Navy		Escort 31 Oct – 5 Nov, Corvette
HNoMS Eglantine	Royal Norwegian Navy		Escort 1 – 5 Nov, Corvette
HMS Broke (D83)	Royal Navy		Escort 1 – 4 Nov, Flotilla leader
HMS Buxton (H96)	Royal Navy		Escort 1 – 4 Nov, Destroyer
HMS Begonia (K66)	Royal Navy		Escort 1 – 4 Nov, Corvette
HMT King Sol	Royal Navy		Escort 1 Nov, Trawler
