= Ohio Naval Militia =

Ohio Naval Militia (Ohio Navy)
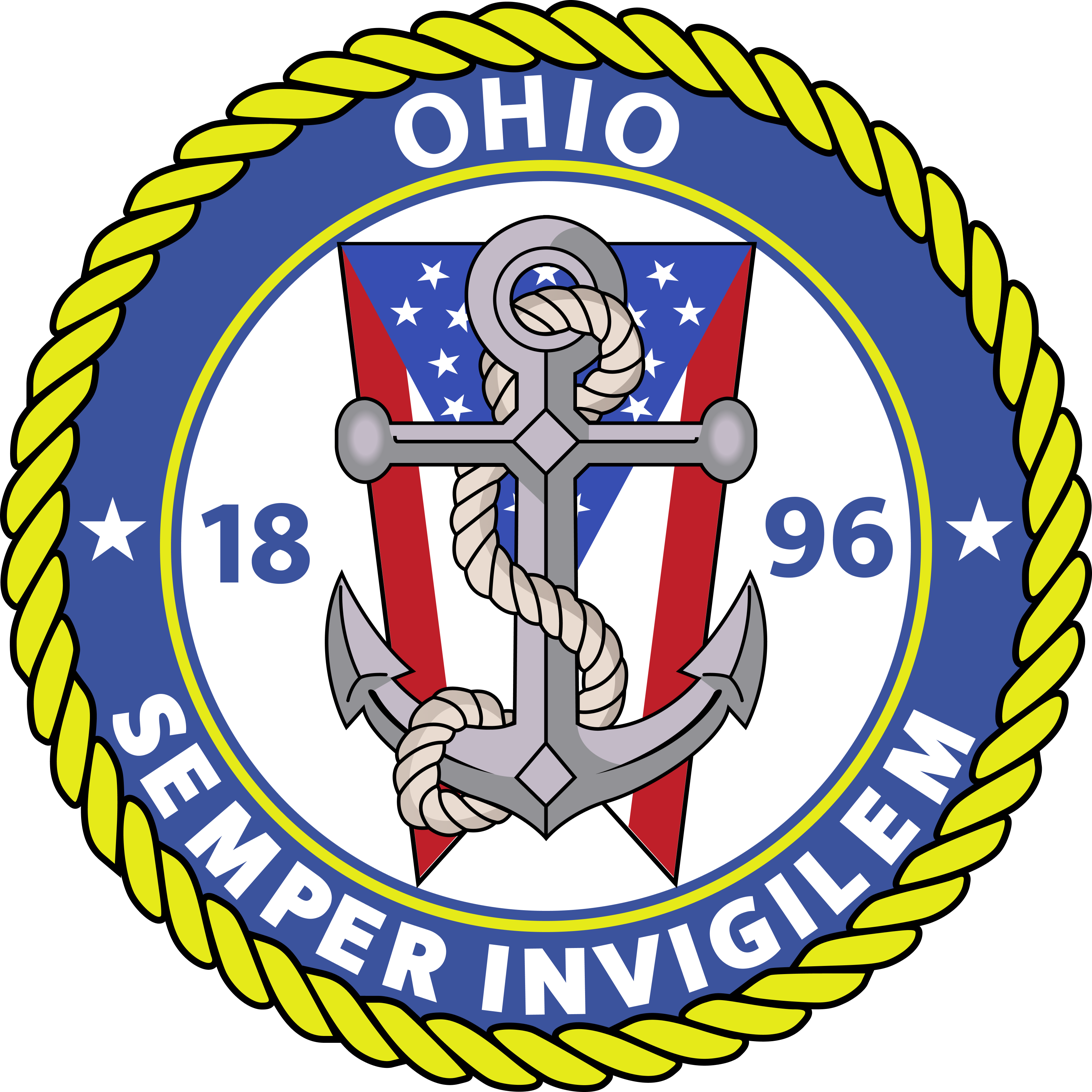
- Emblem of the Ohio Naval Militia
- Active: 1896–1947, 1977–present
- Country: United States
- Allegiance: Ohio
- Type: Naval militia
- Size: 45
- Part of: Ohio State Defense Forces
- Headquarters: Camp Perry, Port Clinton, Ohio
- Nickname: Ohio Navy
- Motto: Semper Invigilem ("Always Watchful")
- Engagements: Spanish-American War; World War I; World War II
- Website: navalmilitia.ohio.gov

Commanders
- Commander-In-Chief: Governor Mike DeWine
- Adjutant General: Brigadier General Matthew S. Woodruff, ARNG
- Commander, State Defense Forces of Ohio: Brigadier General (OH) Larry M. Pinkerton, Jr.
- Commandant: Captain (OH) Bethany Carpenter

Insignia
- Flag

- Guidon

- Shoulder sleeve insignia

The Ohio Naval Militia (Ohio Navy) is the naval militia of the State of Ohio. It is the naval arm of the State of Ohio's Adjutant General's Department, and is part of Ohio's military forces.

Their operational headquarters are on the Camp Perry Joint Training Center, in Port Clinton, Ohio, on the shores of Lake Erie.

Members, who are at least 18 years of age (17 with parental consent; there are no upper age limitations), typically drill one weekend a month and one "short" week in the summer. From the months of April, through November, the drills consist primarily of patrolling the impact area of Lake Erie immediately adjacent to Camp Perry's firing range.

== History ==
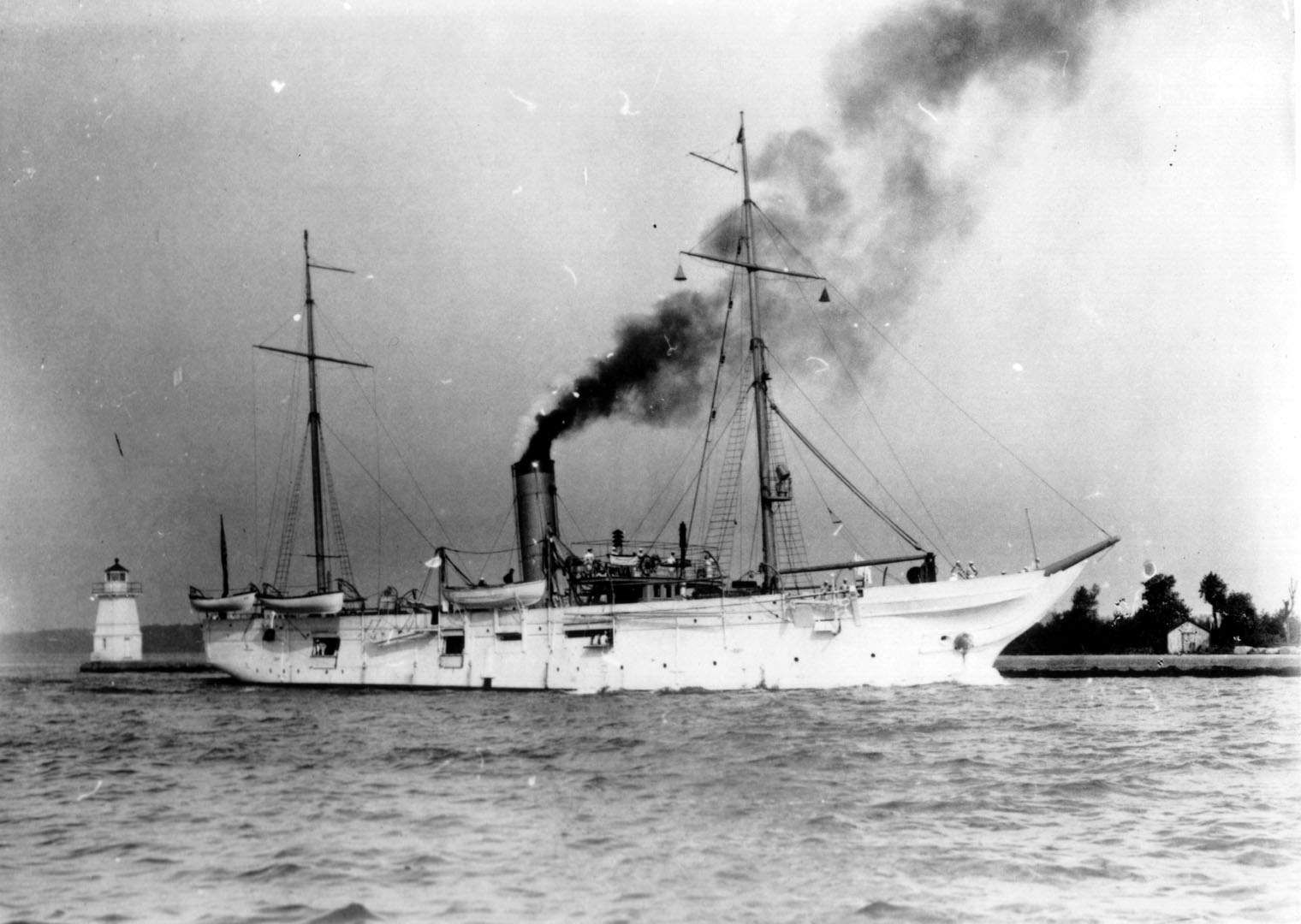
The USS Essex, loaned to the Ohio Naval Militia to serve as a training ship, in 1913.

On March 1, 1896, an act was passed by the Ohio General Assembly providing for the organization of two battalions to be known as the Naval Brigade of the National Guard of Ohio. Without funds for outfitting or maintenance, they mustered in Toledo in July and through further organization, one battalion was located in Cleveland and one in Toledo.

In 1898, the United States Congress declared war against Spain. In an effort to get Spain out of Cuba, President William McKinley was authorized to use all land and naval forces, as well as militia to enforce Congressional demands. At this time, the naval forces in the State of Ohio became the Ohio Naval Militia (ONM). The Ohio Naval Militia participated in the war, fighting as part of the 10th Ohio Volunteer Infantry.

The ONM later purchased the old revenue cutter Andrew Johnson, which was refitted accordingly. The U.S. Navy also assigned the USS Michigan to train naval militias on the Great Lakes. The first training was at Johnson's Island in Sandusky Bay in July 1897.

On 20 April 1917 the ship's company of USS Dorothea at Cleveland, part of the ONM, was the first Ohio National Guard unit activated for service in the First World War.

In 1936, a new Naval Militia Armory, located in Bayview Park in Toledo and built by the WPA was dedicated. It served the needs of the ONM until 1947 when it was taken over by the newly formed U.S. Naval Reserve.

The ONM was deactivated following World War II, and remained so for nearly 30 years. In 1974, the former lieutenant governor, John W. Brown began the process of reactivating the Ohio Naval Militia; and on November 1, 1977, the ONM was reactivated with John W. Brown as the first commandant.

In 2020, the Ohio Naval Militia was activated alongside the Ohio National Guard and the Ohio Military Reserve to take part in Operation Steady Resolve, the name given to the National Guard's mission to combat the COVID-19 pandemic.

== Mission ==
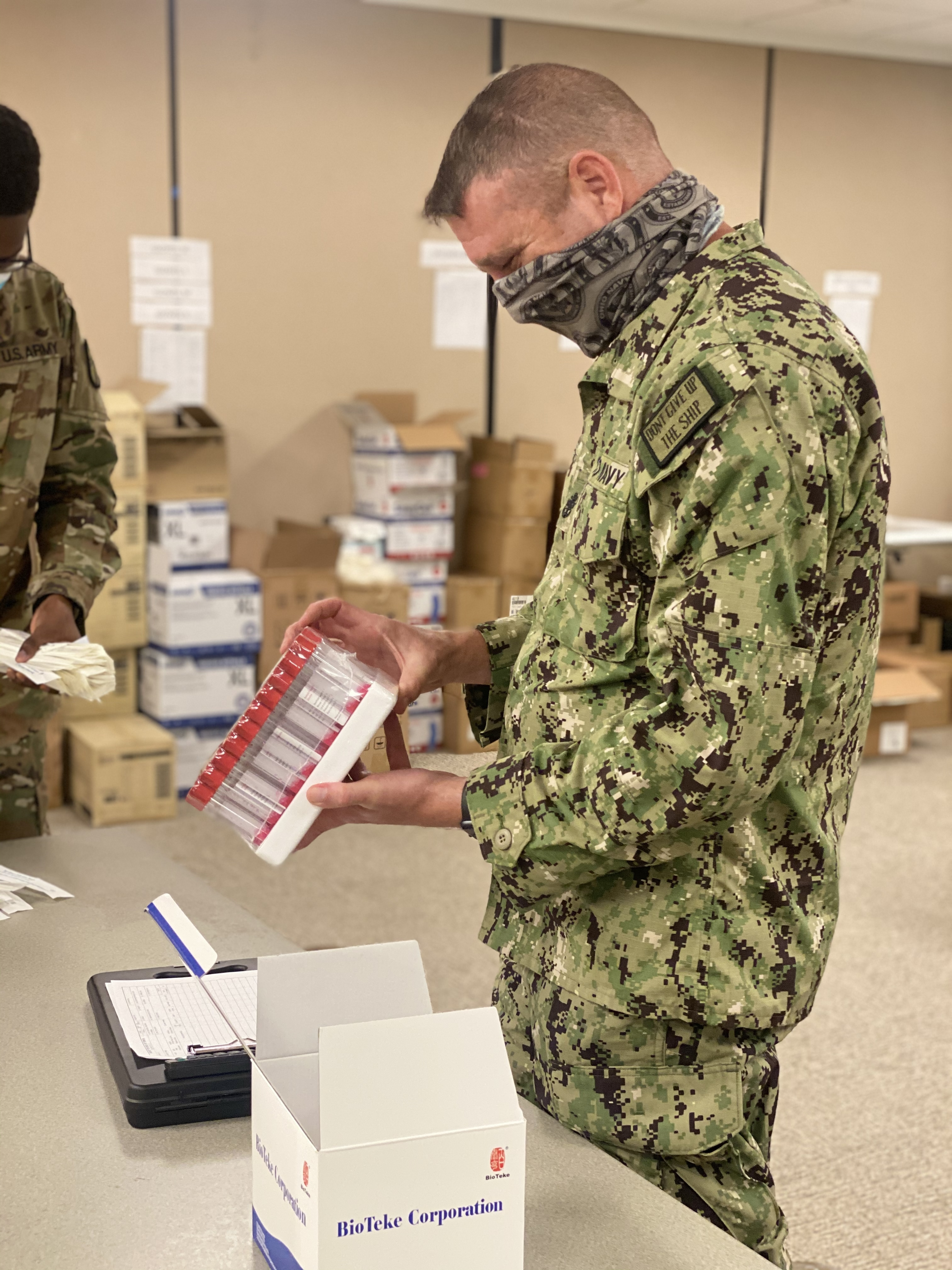
A member of the Ohio Naval Militia inventories Covid-19 testing kits.

The ONM assists in natural disasters or other emergencies, as called upon by the governor or the Adjutant General.

Their active mission is to patrol the government impact area off Camp Perry, in the waters of Lake Erie. It is a live-fire area that requires keeping pleasure boaters and fishermen from entering. By patrolling the impact area, the ONM provides support for the Ohio National Guard and other state and federal military units as they perform weapons qualifications prior to deploying.

By conducting continuous training on their boats and in the classroom, members have the opportunity to become coxswains (boat operators) and boat crew. ONM members also receive basic boating education training to prepare for certification by the Ohio Division of Watercraft. They teach basic navigation, radio communications, boat handling, maintenance, boating safety, and boating support functions. All ONM training hours are documented and can be applied toward obtaining a captain's license from the U.S. Coast Guard.

== Organization ==
The Ohio Naval Militia is an organized as part of the Ohio State Defense Force, which serves under the direction of the Governor of the State of Ohio as Commander in Chief through the office of the Adjutant General's Department. They are governed by Ohio Revised Code chapters 5921, 5923, and 5924.

The Ohio Naval Militia is organized into ship companies, with a maximum of three companies. Each company comprises two to three divisions. However, in the event of an emergency declared by the President or Congress or caused by enemy action, the governor, as the commander-in-chief, has the authority to expand the forces as necessary to meet the situation's needs. In Ohio Fiscal Year 2025, the ONM had a total authorized strength of 300 sailors, of which 45 positions were filled.

Command:

- Commander-In-Chief - Governor Mike DeWine
- Adjutant General - Brigadier General Matthew S. Woodruff, ARNG.
- Commander, State Defense Forces of Ohio - Brigadier General (OH) Larry M. Pinkerton Jr.
- Commandant, Ohio Naval Militia - Captain (OH) Bethany Carpenter

An organizational chart depicting the organization of the Ohio Naval Militia.

== Vessels ==
The Ohio Naval Militia currently utilizes the Defender B class boat, also known as the Response Boat–Small (RB-S), as their primary vessel. The Ohio Naval Militia currently operates their vessels in Lake Erie off the coast of Ohio patrolling the impact zone of the Camp Perry Training Center ranges.

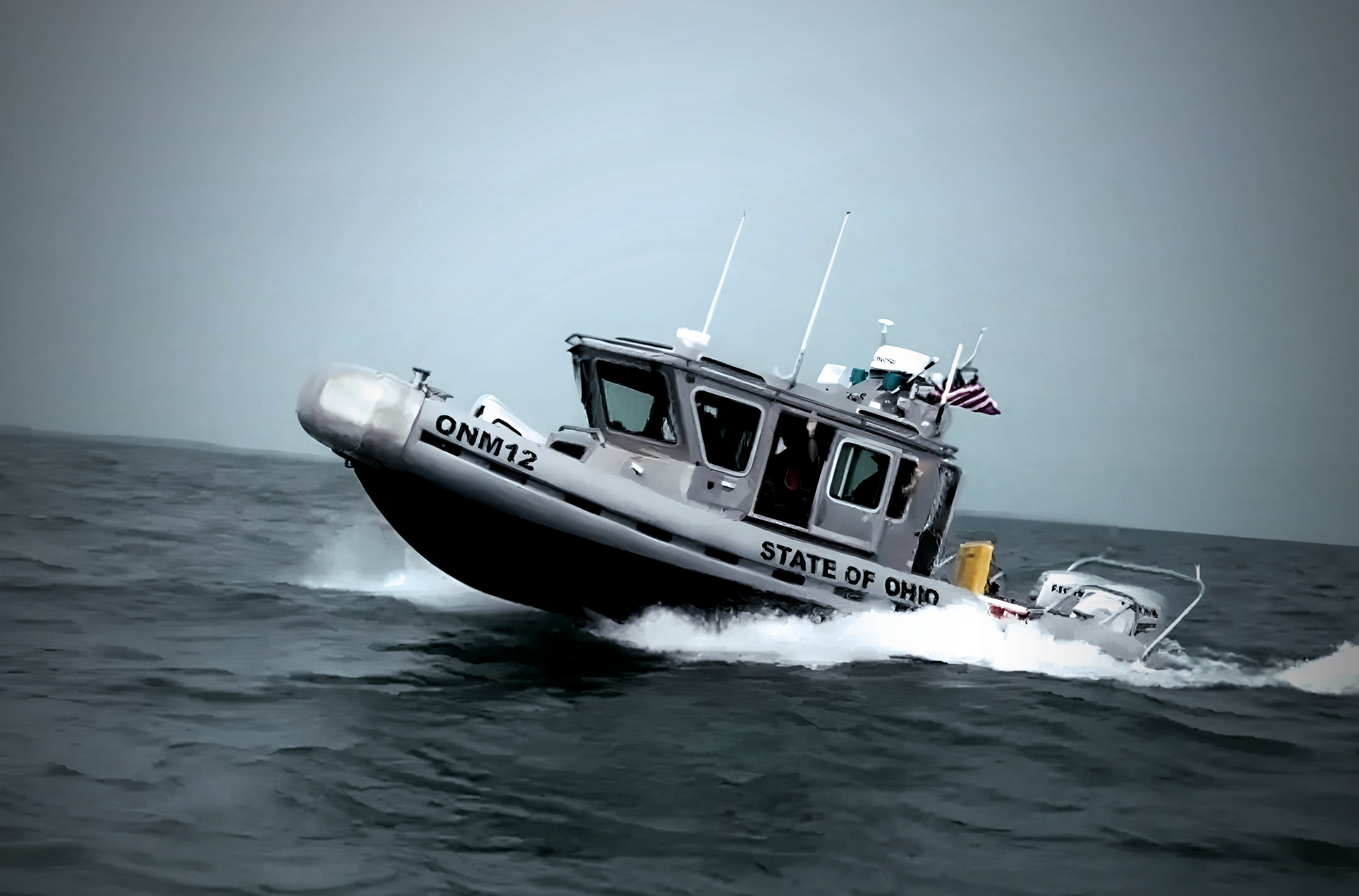
An Ohio Naval Militia vessel underway in 2024

== Legal protection ==
Under Ohio law, members of the Ohio Naval Militia are guaranteed the same employment rights and protections as federal reservists under the Uniformed Services Employment and Reemployment Rights Act (USERRA). Among other legal rights guaranteed under this provision, Ohio Naval Militia members are protected from discrimination based on their membership in the Ohio Naval Militia both during the hiring process and after becoming employed; they are also guaranteed a leave of absence from their places of employment whenever they are activated for training or to take part in an emergency, and their employers are required to reinstate these employees to their previous positions when they return from deployment.

== See also ==
- Ohio Military Reserve
- United States Coast Guard Auxiliary
