= GN convoys =

Series of Caribbean convoys during World War II

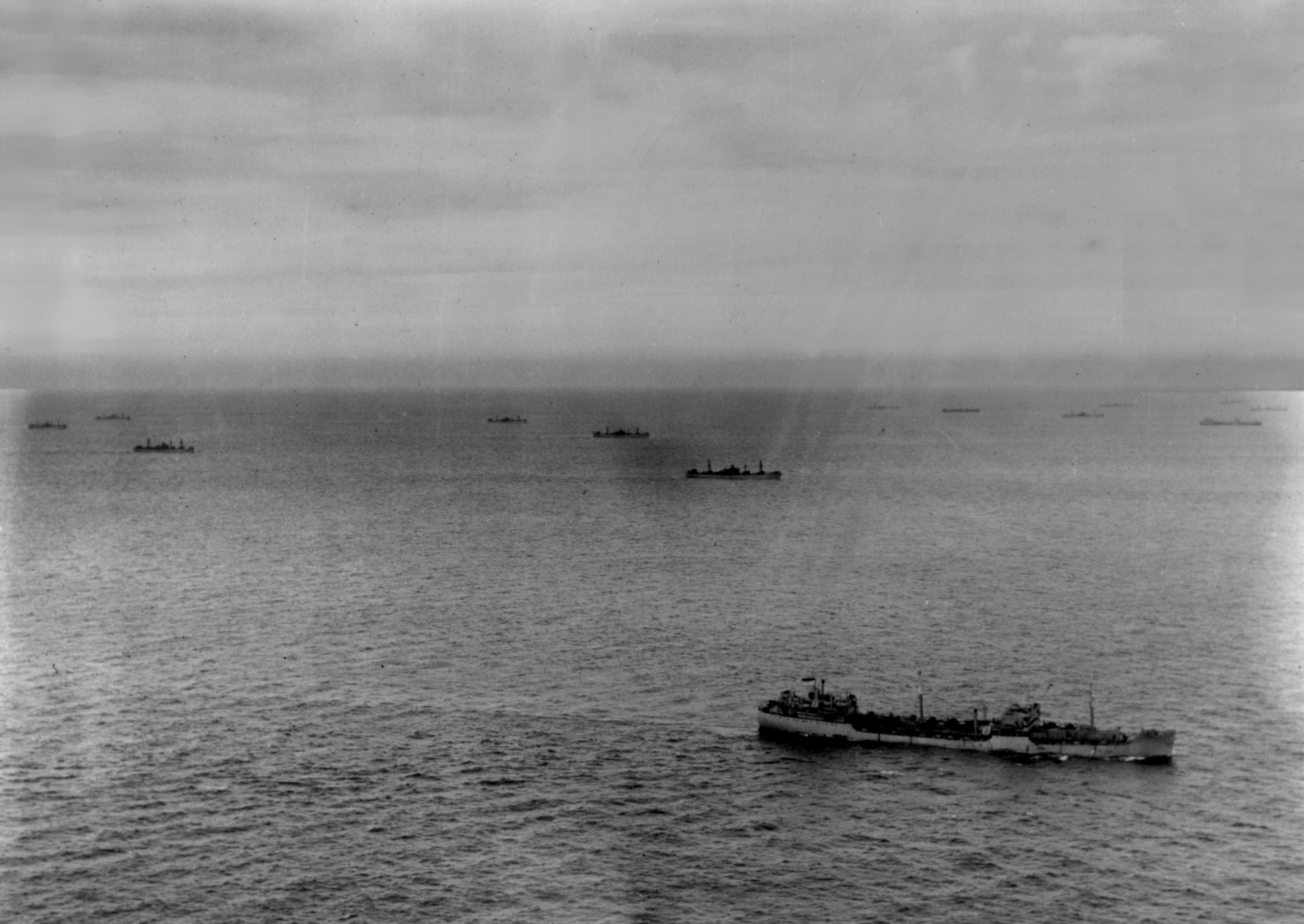
- A convoy photographed from US Navy airship K-28, assigned to Blimp Squadron 24 (ZP-24) at Naval Air Station Weeksville, North Carolina (USA).
- Type: GN Convoys
- Location: North Atlantic Ocean
- Planned: 207
- Objective: Merchant convoys between Guantanamo Bay, Cuba, and New York City
- Date: August 1942 to May 1945

Ports of call for GN convoys

The GN convoys were a series of Caribbean convoys which ran during the Battle of the Atlantic in World War II.

They take their name from the route: Guantanamo, Cuba to New York City

== Overview ==
The GN series was the reverse of NG series that ran from August 1942 until 18 May 1945. There were 207 GN convoys, comprising 4,313 individual ship listings and 18 escorts. Some of the ships listed in a convoy did not always make the complete trip between Guantanamo and New York though, a few returned to Guantanamo, stopped at Charleston, South Carolina, or other ports.

== Convoy List ==
=== 1942 ===
Convoy	Departure Date	Arrival Date	No.of Merchant Ships	No.of Escort Ships	Notes
GN 1	5 September 1942	12 September 1942	34	0	0 vessels lost
GN 2	8 September 1942	15 September 1942	4	0	0 vessels lost
GN 4	12 September 1942	19 September 1942	23	0	0 vessels lost
GN 4	15 September 1942	23 September 1942	13	0	0 vessels lost
GN 5	19 September 1942	26 September 1942	13	5	0 vessels lost
GN 6	22 September 1942	30 September 1942	19	0	0 vessels lost
GN 7	26 September 1942	4 October 1942	19	0	0 vessels lost
GN 8	29 September 1942	7 October 1942	11	0	0 vessels lost
GN 9	3 October 1942	11 October 1942	23	0	0 vessels lost
GN 10	6 October 1942	13 October 1942	4	0	0 vessels lost
GN 11	10 October 1942	16 October 1942	22	0	0 vessels lost
GN 12	15 October 1942	24 October 1942	43	0	0 vessels lost
GN 13	18 October 1942	24 October 1942	9	0	0 vessels lost
GN 14	23 October 1942	30 October 1942	33	0	0 vessels lost
GN 15	26 October 1942	2 November 1942	22	0	0 vessels lost
GN 16	31 October 1942	9 November 1942	35	0	0 vessels lost
GN 17	3 November 1942	10 November 1942	24	0	0 vessels lost
GN 18	8 November 1942	17 November 1942	34	0	0 vessels lost
GN 19	11 November 1942	17 November 1942	24	5	0 vessels lost
GN 20	16 November 1942	23 November 1942	35	0	0 vessels lost
GN 21	19 November 1942	25 November 1942	20	0	0 vessels lost
GN 22	24 November 1942	2 December 1942	43	0	0 vessels lost
GN 23	27 November 1942	4 December 1942	25	0	0 vessels lost
GN 24	1 December 1942	8 December 1942	49	0	0 vessels lost
GN 25	4 December 1942	10 December 1942	23	0	0 vessels lost
GN 26	9 December 1942	18 December 1942	42	5	0 vessels lost
GN 27	12 December 1942	19 December 1942	10	0	0 vessels lost
GN 28	16 December 1942	24 December 1942	42	0	0 vessels lost
GN 29	20 December 1942	26 December 1942	29	0	0 vessels lost
GN 30	24 December 1942	1 January 1943	51	0	0 vessels lost
GN 31	28 December 1942	4 January 1943	25	0	0 vessels lost

=== 1943 ===
Only one convoy was attacked, 13 March 1943, by U-68, which resulted in two ships being lost.

Convoy	Departure Date	Arrival Date	No.of Merchant Ships	No.of Escort Ships	Notes
GN 32	1 January 1943	9 January 1943	49	0	0 vessels lost
GN 33	5 January 1943	11 January 1943	14	0	0 vessels lost
GN 34	9 January 1943	16 January 1943	33	0	0 vessels lost
GN 35	13 January 1943	19 January 1943	15	0	0 vessels lost
GN 36	17 January 1943	25 January 1943	16	0	0 vessels lost
GN 37	22 January 1943	27 January 1943	32	0	0 vessels lost
GN Spec 2	24 January 1943	31 January 1943	7	0	0 vessels lost
GN 38	29 January 1943	4 February 1943	58	0	0 vessels sunk
GN 39	3 February 1943	11 February 1943	19	0	0 vessels lost
GN 40	8 February 1943	16 February 1943	33	0	0 vessels lost
GN 41	13 February 1943	21 February 1943	27	0 vessels lost	
GN 42	18 February 1943	26 February 1943	23	0	0 vessels lost
GN 43	23 February 1943	2 March 1943	32	0	0 vessels lost
GN 44	28 February 1943	7 March 1943	21	0	0 vessels lost
GN 45	5 March 1943	13 March 1943	37	0	0 vessels lost
GN 46	10 March 1943	17 March 1943	38	0	0 vessels lost
GN 47	15 March 1943	23 March 1943	40	0	0 vessels lost
GN 48	20 March 1943	28 March 1943	33	0	0 vessels lost
GN 49	24 March 1943	31 March 1943	13	0 vessels lost	
GN 50	30 March 1943	7 April 1943	29	0	0 vessels lost
GN 51	4 April 1943	11 April 1943	25	0	0 vessels lost
GN 52	9 April 1943	17 April 1943	43	0	0 vessels lost
GN 53	14 April 1943	20 April 1943	23	0	0 vessels lost
GN 54	19 April 1943	26 April 1943	37	0	0 vessels lost
GN 55	24 April 1943	2 May 1943	14	0	0 vessels lost
GN 56	29 April 1943	6 May 1943	30	0	0 vessels lost
GN 57	4 May 1943	12 May 1943	22	0	0 vessels lost
GN 58	9 May 1943	17 May 1943	32	0	0 vessels lost
GN 59	14 May 1943	22 May 1943	27	0	0 vessels lost
GN 60	19 May 1943	27 May 1943	29	0	0 vessels lost
GN 61	24 May 1943	31 May 1943	18	0	0 vessels lost
GN 62	29 May 1943	6 June 1943	20	0	0 vessels lost
GN 63	3 June 1943	10 June 1943	27	0	0 vessels lost
GN 64	8 June 1943	16 June 1943	39	0	0 vessels lost
GN 65	13 June 1943	20 June 1943	25	0	0 vessels lost
GN 66	18 June 1943	26 June 1943	21	0	0 vessels lost
GN 67	23 June 1943	1 July 1943	29	0	0 vessels lost
GN 68	28 June 1943	4 July 1943	32	0	0 vessels lost
GN 69	3 July 1943	10 July 1943	25	0	0 vessels lost
GN 70	8 July 1943	15 July 1943	27	0	0 vessels lost
GN 71	13 July 1943	21 July 1943	26	0	0 vessels lost
GN 72	18 July 1943	25 July 1943	11	0	0 vessels lost
GN 73	23 July 1943	31 July 1943	29	0	0 vessels lost
GN 74	28 July 1943	4 August 1943	17	0	0 vessels lost
GN 75	2 August 1943	10 August 1943	12	0	0 vessels lost
GN 76	7 August 1943	14 August 1943	29	0	0 vessels lost
GN 77	11 August 1943	19 August 1943	31	0	0 vessels lost
GN 78	17 August 1943	24 August 1943	14	0	0 vessels lost
GN 79	22 August 1943	29 August 1943	20	0	0 vessels lost
GN 80	27 August 1943	3 September 1943	20	0	0 vessels lost
GN 81	1 September 1943	9 September 1943	23	0	0 vessels lost
GN 82	6 September 1943	14 September 1943	20	0	0 vessels lost
GN 83	11 September 1943	18 September 1943	26	0	0 vessels lost
GN 84	15 September 1943	23 September 1943	26	0	0 vessels lost
GN 85	21 September 1943	29 September 1943	20	0	0 vessels lost
GN 86	25 September 1943	3 October 1943	16	0	0 vessels lost
GN 87	1 October 1943	9 October 1943	22	0	0 vessels lost
GN 88	6 October 1943	14 October 1943	20	0	0 vessels lost
GN 89	11 October 1943	18 October 1943	34	0	0 vessels lost
GN 90	16 October 1943	24 October 1943	14	0	0 vessels lost
GN 91	21 October 1943	29 October 1943	21	0	0 vessels lost
GN 92	26 October 1943	2 November 1943	16	0	0 vessels lost
GN 93	31 October 1943	7 November 1943	13	0	0 vessels lost
GN 94	5 November 1943	12 November 1943	19	0	0 vessels lost
GN 95	10 November 1943	17 November 1943	15	0	0 vessels lost
GN 96	15 November 1943	23 November 1943	14	0	0 vessels lost
GN 97	20 November 1943	28 November 1943	23	0	0 vessels lost
GN 98	25 November 1943	3 December 1943	23	0	0 vessels lost
GN 99	30 November 1943	6 December 1943	20	0	0 vessels lost
GN 100	5 December 1943	12 December 1943	20	0	0 vessels lost
GN 101	10 December 1943	18 December 1943	23	0	0 vessels lost
GN 102	15 December 1943	22 December 1943	21	0	0 vessels lost
GN 103	20 December 1943	27 December 1943	21	0	0 vessels lost
GN 104	25 December 1943	1 January 1944	30	0	0 vessels lost
GN 105	30 December 1943	5 January 1944	23	0	0 vessels lost

=== 1944 ===
Convoy	Departure Date	Arrival Date	No.of Merchant Ships	No.of Escort Ships	Notes
GN 106	4 January 1944	12 January 1944	20	0	0 vessels lost
GN 107	9 January 1944	17 January 1944	24	0	0 vessels lost
GN 108	14 January 1944	20 January 1944	17	0	0 vessels lost
GN 109	19 January 1944	27 January 1944	16	0	0 vessels lost
GN 110	24 January 1944	1 February 1944	27	0	0 vessels lost
GN 111	29 February 1944	6 February 1944	17	0	0 vessels lost
GN 112	3 February 1944	10 February 1944	25	0	0 vessels lost
GN 113	8 February 1944	15 February 1944	21	0	0 vessels lost
GN 114	13 February 1944	21 February 1944	22	0	0 vessels lost
GN 115	18 February 1944	26 February 1944	21	0	0 vessels lost
GN 116	23 February 1944	29 February 1944	20	0	0 vessels lost
GN 117	28 February 1944	6 March 1944	24	0	0 vessels lost
GN 118	4 March 1944	11 March 1944	30	0	0 vessels lost
GN 119	9 March 1944	17 March 1944	29	0	0 vessels lost
GN 120	14 March 1944	21 March 1944	23	0	0 vessels lost
GN 121	19 March 1944	26 March 1944	25	0	0 vessels lost
GN 122	24 March 1944	31 March 1944	29	0	0 vessels lost
GN 123	29 March 1944	5 April 1944	33	0	0 vessels lost
GN 124	3 April 1944	10 April 1944	29	0	0 vessels lost
GN 125	8 April 1944	15 April 1944	32	0	0 vessels lost
GN 126	13 April 1944	20 April 1944	18	0	0 vessels lost
GN 127	18 April 1944	24 April 1944	36	0	0 vessels lost
GN 128	23 April 1944	1 May 1944	38	0	0 vessels lost
GN 129	28 April 1944	5 May 1944	38	0	0 vessels lost
GN 130	3 May 1944	10 May 1944	35	0	0 vessels lost
GN 131	8 May 1944	15 May 1944	32	0	0 vessels lost
GN 132	13 May 1944	21 May 1944	24	0	0 vessels lost
GN 133	18 May 1944	26 May 1944	32	0	0 vessels lost
GN 134	23 May 1944	30 May 1944	19	0	0 vessels lost
GN 135	28 May 1944	4 June 1944	20	0	0 vessels lost
GN 136	2 June 1944	9 June 1944	13	0	0 vessels lost
GN 137	7 June 1944	14 June 1944	29	0	0 vessels lost
GN 138	12 June 1944	19 June 1944	39	0	0 vessels lost
GN 139	17 June 1944	24 June 1944	33	0	0 vessels lost
GN 140	22 June 1944	29 June 1944	22	0	0 vessels lost
GN 141	27 June 1944	5 July 1944	36	0	0 vessels lost
GN 142	2 July 1944	8 July 1944	27	0	0 vessels lost
GN 143	7 July 1944	15 July 1944	13	0	0 vessels lost
GN 144	12 July 1944	19 July 1944	20	0	0 vessels lost
GN 145	17 July 1944	24 July 1944	17	0	0 vessels lost
GN 146	22 July 1944	28 July 1944	7	0	0 vessels lost
GN 147	27 July 1944	5 August 1944	15	0	0 vessels lost
GN 148	1 August 1944	8 August 1944	11	0	0 vessels lost
GN 149	6 August 1944	12 August 1944	4	0	0 vessels lost
GN 150	11 August 1944	19 August 1944	7	0	0 vessels lost
GN 151	16 August 1944	23 August 1944	15	0	0 vessels lost
GN 152	21 August 1944	29 August 1944	3	0	0 vessels lost
GN 153	26 August 1944	3 September 1944	26	0	0 vessels lost
GN 154	31 August 1944	6 September 1944	23	0	0 vessels lost
GN 155	5 September 1944	12 September 1944	33	0	0 vessels lost
GN 156	10 September 1944	18 September 1944	18	0	0 vessels lost
GN 157	15 September 1944	6 September 1944	30	0	0 vessels lost
GN 158	20 September 1944	27 September 1944	35	0	0 vessels lost
GN 159	25 September 1944	2 October 1944	30	0	0 vessels lost
GN 160	30 September 1944	8 October 1944	18	0	0 vessels lost
GN 161	5 October 1944	12 October 1944	9	0	0 vessels lost
GN 162	10 October 1944	18 October 1944	5	0	0 vessels lost
GN 163	14 October 1944	22 October 1944	6	0	0 vessels lost
GN 164	20 October 1944	28 October 1944	3	0	0 vessels lost
GN 165	25 October 1944	1 November 1944	4	0	0 vessels lost
GN 166	30 October 1944	7 November 1944	3	0	0 vessels lost
GN 167	4 November 1944	12 November 1944	5	0	0 vessels lost
GN 168	9 November 1944	16 November 1944	1	0	0 vessels lost
GN 169	14 November 1944	22 November 1944	8	0	0 vessels lost
GN 170	19 November 1944	27 November 1944	3	0	0 vessels lost
GN 171	24 November 1944	2 December 1944	4	0	0 vessels lost
GN 172	29 November 1944	7 December 1944	2	0	0 vessels lost
GN 173	4 December 1944	1 December 1944	3	0	0 vessels lost
GN 174	9 December 1944	17 December 1944	2	0	0 vessels lost
GN 175	14 December 1944	22 December 1944	8	0	0 vessels lost
GN 176				Cancelled	
GN 177	23 December 1944	30 December 1944	3	0	0 vessels lost
GN 178	30 December 1944	6 January 1945	2	0	0 vessels lost

=== 1945 ===
Convoy	Departure Date	Arrival Date	No.of Merchant Ships	No.of Escort Ships	Notes
GN 179	3 January 1945	10 January 1945	6	0	0 vessels lost
GN 180	8 January 1945	15 January 1945	3	0	0 vessels lost
GN 181	13 January 1945	20 January 1945	5	0	0 vessels lost
GN 182	18 January 1945	25 January 1945	4	0	0 vessels lost
GN 183	23 January 1945	30 January 1945	4	0	0 vessels lost
GN 184	28 January 1945	4 February 1945	5	0	0 vessels lost
GN 185	2 February 1945	9 February 1945	6	0	0 vessels lost
GN 186	7 February 1945	14 February 1945	1	0	0 vessels lost
GN 187	12 February 1945	19 February 1945	7	0	0 vessels lost
GN 188	17 February 1945	24 February 1945	8	0	0 vessels lost
GN 189	22 February 1945	28 February 1945	2	0	0 vessels lost
GN 190	27 February 1945	6 March 1945	8	0	0 vessels lost
GN 191	4 March 1945	11 March 1945	4	0	0 vessels lost
GN 192	9 March 1945	15 March 1945	3	0	0 vessels lost
GN 193	13 March 1945	21 March 1945	4	0	0 vessels lost
GN 194	9 March 1945	26 March 1945	4	0	0 vessels lost
GN 195	24 March 1945	31 March 1945	3	0	0 vessels lost
GN 196	29 March 1945	4 April 1945	3	0	0 vessels lost
GN 197	3 April 1945	10 April 1945	5	0	0 vessels lost
GN 198	8 April 1945	15 April 1945	6	0	0 vessels lost
GN 199	13 April 1945	20 April 1945	8	0	0 vessels lost
GN 200	18 April 1945	24 April 1945	10	0	0 vessels lost
GN 201	23 April 1945	30 April 1945	21	0	0 vessels lost
GN 202	28 April 1945	5 May 1945	36	0	0 vessels lost
GN 203	3 May 1945	10 May 1945	48	0	0 vessels lost
GN 204	8 May 1945	15 May 1945	41	0	0 vessels lost
GN 205	13 May 1945	19 May 1945	33	0	0 vessels lost
GN 206	18 May 1945	25 May 1945	3	0	0 vessels lost
GN Spec 1	31 August 1945	6 September 1945	2	3	0 vessels lost

== Notes ==
Citations

== Bibliography ==
Books

- Arnold Hague (2000). The Allied Convoy System 1939–1945. Chatham. ISBN 1-86176-147-3.
- Rohwer, J. & Hummelchen, G. (1992). Chronology of the War at Sea 1939–1945. Naval Institute Press. ISBN 1-55750-105-X.
- Silverstone, Paul H. (1968). U.S. Warships of World War II. Doubleday and Company.

Online resources

- "GN Convoy Series". Convoy Web - Arnold Hague Convoy Database.
