= HMS Folkestone (L22) =

Sloop of the Royal Navy

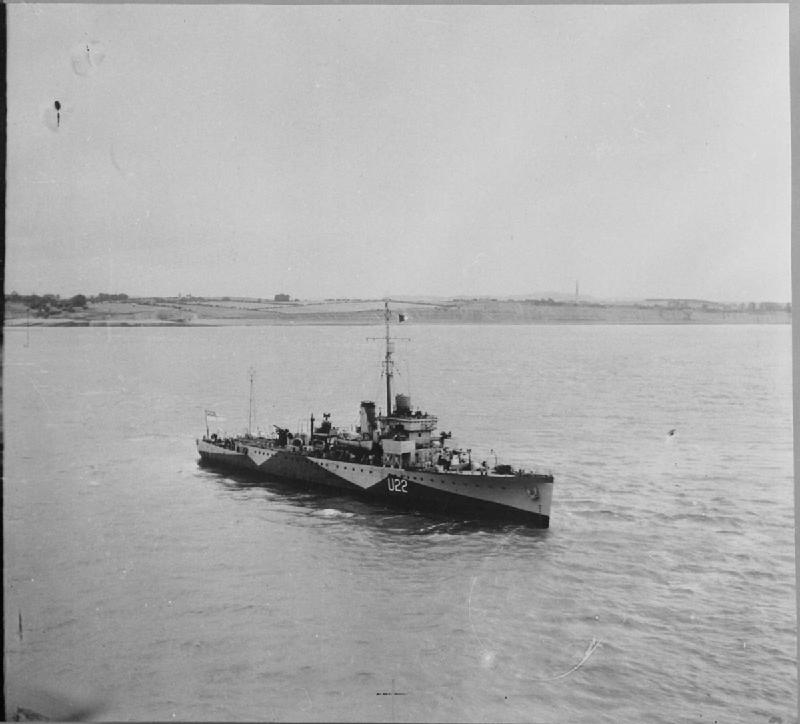
- Foikestone in coastal waters during World War II

History

United Kingdom
- Name: HMS Folkestone
- Builder: Swan Hunter and Wigham Richardson Ltd., Wallsend-on-Tyne
- Laid down: 21 May 1929
- Launched: 12 February 1930
- Commissioned: 25 June 1930
- Identification: Pennant number L22 (later U22)
- Fate: Sold 22 May 1947; broken up November 1947

General characteristics
- Class & type: Hastings-class sloop
- Displacement: 1,045 tons
- Length: 250 ft (76 m)
- Beam: 34 ft (10 m)
- Propulsion: Geared turbines; two shafts; 2,000 hp (1,500 kW)
- Speed: 16 knots (30 km/h; 18 mph)
- Complement: 100
- Armament: 2 × 4-inch (102 mm) guns (2 × 1); 4 × .5 in AA gun (1 × 4)

HMS Folkestone was a Hastings-class sloop of the Royal Navy that saw action in World War II. She was built by Swan Hunter and Wigham Richardson Ltd. of Wallsend-on-Tyne, laid down on 21 May 1929 and launched on 12 February 1930. She was commissioned on 25 June 1930 under the pennant number L22/U22.

She was sold on 22 May 1947 and broken up in November that year by Ward, of Milford Haven.

== Construction and design ==
Folkestone was one of two Hastings-class sloops ordered on 28 February 1928 as part of the 1928 construction programme, with two more ordered later in the year. The Hastings class was an improved version of the Bridgewater-class, with modified internal arrangements to improve habitability in tropical climates, and had a dual role of patrol service in overseas stations in peacetime and minesweeping during war. She was laid down at Swan Hunter's Wallsend shipyard on 21 May 1929, was launched without ceremony on 12 February 1930 and completed on 25 June that year.

Folkestone was 266 feet 4 inches (81.18 m) long overall with a beam of 34 feet 1 inch (10.39 m) and a draught of 11 feet 3 inches (3.43 m) at full load. Displacement was 1,045 long tons (1,062 t) standard and 1,640 long tons (1,670 t) full load. The ship was powered by two geared steam turbines, each driving one propeller shaft, using steam provided by two Admiralty three-drum boilers. The turbines developed a total of 2,000 shaft horsepower (1,500 kW) and were designed to give a maximum speed of 16.5 knots (30.6 km/h; 19.0 mph).

The main armament consisted of a pair of QF four-inch (102 mm) Mk V guns on the ship's centreline, one forward and one aft, with the forward gun on a high-angle mount, capable of anti-aircraft fire and the second gun on a low-angle mount, for anti-surface use only. Two 3-pounder saluting guns were also carried, while the anti-submarine armament initially consisted of four depth charges. She had a crew of 100 officers and other ranks.

Folkestone was converted to an unarmed survey ship in May 1939, but was rearmed in December 1939, having her forward four inch gun and depth charges (with stowage increased to 40 charges) restored. Two quadruple Vickers .50 machine gun mount were fitted for close-in anti-aircraft duties. A second 4-inch gun and two Oerlikon 20 mm cannons were fitted in July 1941, while in July 1942, two more Oerlikons were added, replacing the Vickers machine guns and a Hedgehog anti submarine mortar was fitted.

== Service ==
Following commissioning, Folkestone was ordered to the Persian Gulf Station, replacing the old Arabis-class sloop Crocus, which had been condemned as unseaworthy and laid up in May that year, arriving in the Gulf in August 1930. In August 1931, she was sent for refit at Colombo, Ceylon (now Sri Lanka), exchanging crews with the sloop Fowey and on completion of the refit in November 1931, joined the China Station based at Hong Kong. In January 1933, Folkestone and the sloop Bridgewater were dispatched to Qinhuangdao in North-east China to protect British interests as a result of fighting between Chinese and Japanese troops at Shanhai Pass at the eastern end of the Great Wall of China. On 6 March 1933 the British-owned steamer Antung ran aground at Mofu Point on Hainan. Folkestone was sent from Hong Kong to Antung's assistance, but most of the passengers and crew from the ship were rescued by the merchant ship Anhui, with about 100 more reaching the shore. Folkestone stood by the stranded ship while salvage attempts were made, but these were prevented by the heavy seas and Antung was wrecked, with about 50 passengers and crew missing. Folkestone recommissioned at Hong Kong in April 1934 and at Singapore in October 1936. On 15 May 1939 Folkestone was near-missed by Japanese machine gun fire when Shantou was attacked by Japanese bombers.

Later in May 1939, Folkestone began conversion to an unarmed survey ship in Hong Kong, with it being planned that the ship would be deployed to New Zealand. The outbreak of the Second World War led to this conversion being abandoned, however, and after being partially rearmed, she was ordered back to British waters where she arrived in February 1940.

Folkestone joined the Western Approaches Command, based at Liverpool and operating in the North Atlantic. On 4 June 1940, she collided with the coaster River Humber off Anglesey. River Humber was sunk, with Folkestone being repaired at Cardiff. On 17 October 1940 off Iceland, Folkestone rescued seven survivors from SS Doka, a Norwegian merchantman sunk by the German submarine U-93. On 1 December 1940, the Britain-bound Convoy HX 90 came under attack before its escort had met up with the convoy. The convoy's escort, including Folkestone joined the convoy on 2 December, and helped to drive away some of the attacking U-boats, but the convoy still lost 9 merchant ships before the attacks ended. Folkestone was refitted at Liverpool in December 1940, and again in April–May 1941, when she was fitted with Type 286 radar. In October 1941, Folkestone was part of the 42nd Escort Group, based at Londonderry, employed on escorting convoys between Britain and Freetown in Sierra Leone. She was slightly damaged in a collision during November that year.

Folkestone was refitted again at Cardiff from April–June 1942, being fitted with Centimetric Type 271 radar and a Hedgehog anti-submarine mortar. On 16 August, Folkestone was part of the escort for Convoy SL 118 from Freetown to the United Kingdom, when the convoy was sighted by a German U-boat near the Azores, and a wolfpack of seven U-boats directed against the convoy. Folkestone detected radio signals from a German submarine with the ship's High-frequency direction finding gear, and running down the bearing found U-333, and carried out a series of six depth-charge attacks on the submarine, which was badly damaged, with its starboard propeller shaft bent upwards, and forced to abort its patrol. U-333's commander, Peter-Erich Cremer, later reported that the attacks shook the submarine "to the breaking point". Attacks continued until 20 August, with four merchant ships sunk and three U-boats badly damaged. Folkestone was refitted at Londonderry in October–November 1942. By December, she was a member of the 44th Escort Group.

In late February 1943, the 44th Escort Group, of four sloops, including Folkestone, and two frigates, formed the close escort for the westbound Convoy UC 1, consisting of 32 merchant ships, including 17 unloaded oil tankers, with an American escort group of four modern destroyers in support. The convoy came under heavy attack by eleven U-boats. Four tankers were sunk and two damaged, with one U-boat, U-552, sunk by the sloop Totland. Folkestone was refitted at Grimsby in April–May 1943 before joining the Western African Command, operating out of Freetown on convoy escort duties. She returned to England in September 1943 for a refit at Liverpool, during which she suffered a minor boiler explosion on 13 November. Following the refit Folkestone returned to Freetown. In March 1944, she joined the 56th Escort Group, still based at Freetown.

In September 1944 Folkestone returned to Britain, and after a survey indicated that she was beyond economic repair was laid up at Milford Haven. After the end of the year she was used for bomb trials, and on 22 May 1947 was transferred to BISCO for disposal, being scrapped by Ward at their Milford Haven yard from November that year.
