= USS Charles F. Hughes =

Benson-class destroyer

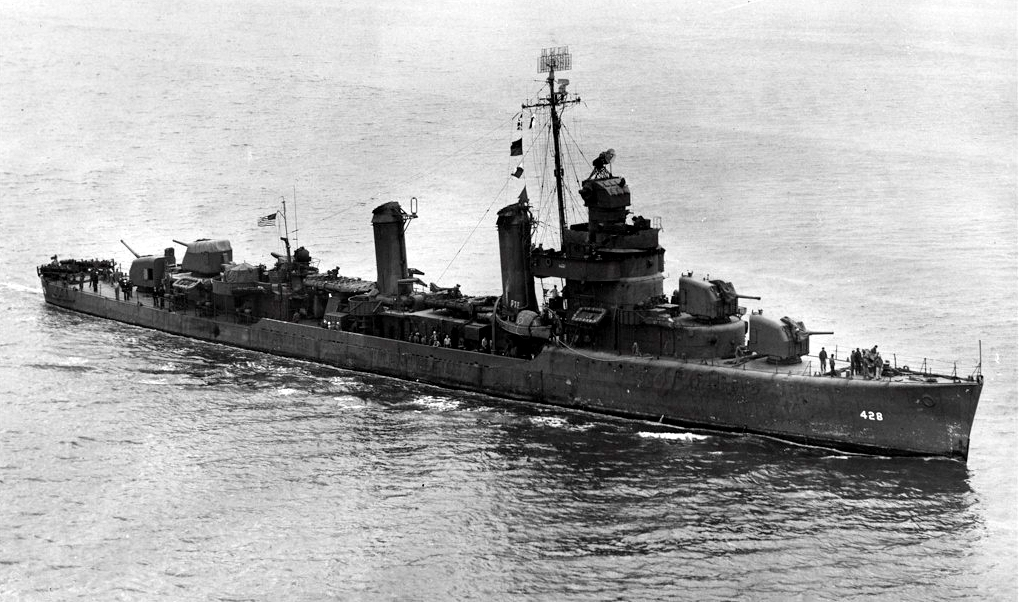
- USS Charles F. Hughes (DD-428) in 1945

History

United States
- Name: USS Charles F. Hughes (DD-428)
- Namesake: Charles Frederick Hughes
- Builder: Puget Sound Naval Shipyard
- Laid down: 3 January 1938
- Launched: 16 May 1940
- Commissioned: 5 September 1940
- Decommissioned: 18 March 1946
- Stricken: 1 June 1969
- Fate: Sunk as target, 26 March 1969

General characteristics
- Class & type: Benson-class destroyer
- Displacement: 1,620 tons
- Length: 348 ft 3 in (106.15 m)
- Beam: 36 ft 1 in (11.00 m)
- Draught: 11 ft 9 in (3.58 m)
- Speed: 33 kts
- Complement: 191
- Armament: 4 x 1 5 in (127 mm)/38 guns, 2 x 5 21 inch (533 mm) tt.

USS Charles F. Hughes (DD-428) was a Benson-class destroyer in the United States Navy during World War II. She was named for Charles Frederick Hughes.

Charles F. Hughes was launched 16 May 1940 by Puget Sound Navy Yard, Bremerton, Washington; sponsored by Mrs. C. F. Hughes; and commissioned 5 September 1940.

== 1941 ==
After training operations in the Caribbean, Charles F. Hughes reported at Newport, Rhode Island 3 April 1941 to join in the U.S. Navy's support of Britain. In September 1941, Hughes and other American destroyers took up the responsibility for providing convoy escort in the western Atlantic.

Twice during this period, Hughes rescued survivors from sunken merchantmen. The first rescue came as she steamed escorting the Marine forces bound for the occupation of Iceland in July 1941, when she saved fourteen survivors, including four American Red Cross nurses, from a torpedoed Norwegian freighter. On 16 October, she rescued seven men from a lifeboat, survivors of the British Freighter SS HATASU, a straggler form convoy ON19, sunk a few days previously by U-431.

== 1942 ==
When the United States entered the war, Hughes guarded merchant shipping in coastal convoys, Caribbean sailings, and from the midocean meeting points to Iceland and New York. Between 30 April and 19 May 1942, she made her first complete crossing of the Atlantic in a convoy to Belfast, Northern Ireland, returning to Boston to resume western Atlantic duty. From August 1942, transatlantic convoy duty was her service, with Northern Ireland her usual destination. On 2 November, she sailed from New York to escort the first reinforcement convoy UGF 2 for the North African landings to Casablanca, arriving 18 November. Here she remained on patrol for a month before returning to her usual escort duties.

== 1943-1944 ==
In 1943, Hughes joined in regular UC and CU convoys of tankers from the Bristol Channel to the Netherlands West Indies. The first of these, on which she sailed from Londonderry Port 15 February, was almost constantly under attack or shadowed by "wolfpacks". Hughes and the other escorts kept losses low by their aggressive attacks, and only one submarine attack, on the night of 23/24 February, was successful in penetrating the alert screen.

Hughes escorted a convoy to Casablanca, returning to New York, in November and December 1943, and on 4 January 1944, sailed from Norfolk, Virginia, to join the 8th Fleet in the Mediterranean Sea. After convoy operations in North African waters supporting the buildup of forces on the bitterly contested Anzio beachhead, on 7 February she moved north to base at Naples.

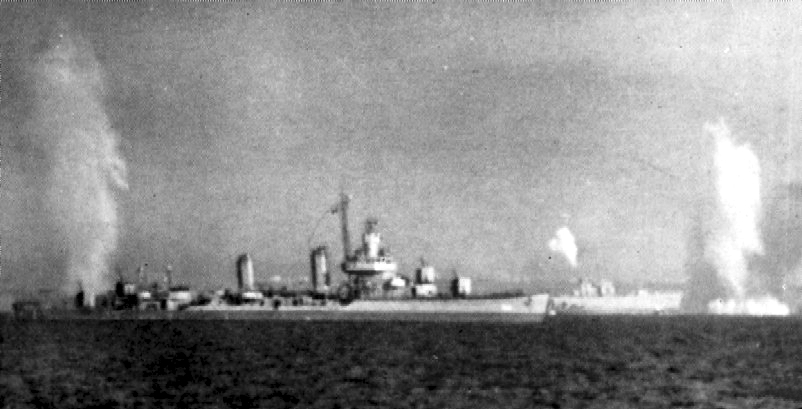
Charles F. Hughes off Anzio, 1944.

Through early March, she returned to Anzio again and again, to provide shore bombardment, screening, and patrol services. For the American troops dug in under almost constant German counterattack, the whistle of shells over head from such ships as Hughes was a most comforting sound. From 3 March to 4 April, the destroyer resumed convoy escort duties in north African waters and patrol at Gibraltar, then returned to operate off Anzio until just before the final breakout from the beachhead late in May.

Returning to antisubmarine patrol and escort duties in the western Mediterranean, Hughes arrived at Naples 30 July 1944 to prepare for the invasion of southern France. While protecting the eastern flank of the shipping off the beachhead from attack on the night of 19/20 August, she spotted three German E-boats attempting to penetrate the screen, and forced two of them to beach while she sank the third by gunfire. With the beachhead secure, Hughes resumed patrol and escort services throughout the western Mediterranean, particularly in the Gulf of Genoa. Between 7 and 16 December, she provided call-fire support off Monaco, previously bypassed because of its neutrality, but now under attack because German forces had invested it.

== End of World War II and fate ==
Hughes returned to Brooklyn for overhaul 12 January 1945, and after a final convoy escort voyage to Oran, got underway for duty in the Pacific. She arrived at Ulithi 13 June, and through the remainder of the war escorted convoys to Okinawa. Was present in Tokyo Bay for the signing of The Japanese Instrument of Surrender which took place aboard the USS Missouri (BB-63) 2 September 1945. Through September and October, she sailed with convoys from Ulithi and the Philippines to Japanese ports, and on 4 November, was homeward bound from Tokyo. She arrived at Charleston, South Carolina, 7 December, and on 18 March 1946 was placed out of commission in reserve.

Hughes was sunk as a target off Virginia on 26 March 1969 and struck from the Naval Vessel Register on 1 June 1969.

== Convoys escorted ==
Convoy	Escort Group	Dates	Notes
	task force 19	1–7 July 1941	occupation of Iceland prior to US declaration of war
ON 18		24 Sept-2 Oct 1941	from Iceland to Newfoundland prior to US declaration of war
HX 154		12-19 Oct 1941	from Newfoundland to Iceland prior to US declaration of war
ON 30		2-9 Nov 1941	from Iceland to Newfoundland prior to US declaration of war
HX 162		29 Nov-7 Dec 1941	from Newfoundland to Iceland prior to US declaration of war
AT 18		6-17 Aug 1942	troopships from New York City to Firth of Clyde
UGF 2		2-18 Nov 1942	from Chesapeake Bay to Morocco
UC 1		15 Feb-6 March 1943	from Liverpool to Curacao
CU 1		20 March-1 April 1943	from Curacao to Liverpool
UC 2		9–23 April 1943	from Liverpool to Curacao
CU 2		21 May-5 June 1943	from Curacao to Liverpool
UC 3		10–26 June 1943	from Liverpool to Curacao
CU 3		11–24 July 1943	from Curacao to Firth of Clyde
UC 3A		30 July-10 Aug 1943	from Liverpool to Curacao
CU 4		26 Aug-9 Sept 1943	from Curacao to Liverpool
UC 4		15-27 Sept 1943	from Liverpool to Curacao

== Awards ==
Charles F. Hughes received four battle stars for World War II service.

As of 2005, no other ship in the United States Navy has been named Charles F. Hughes.
