= USS Dorothea (1898) =

Gunboat of the United States Navy

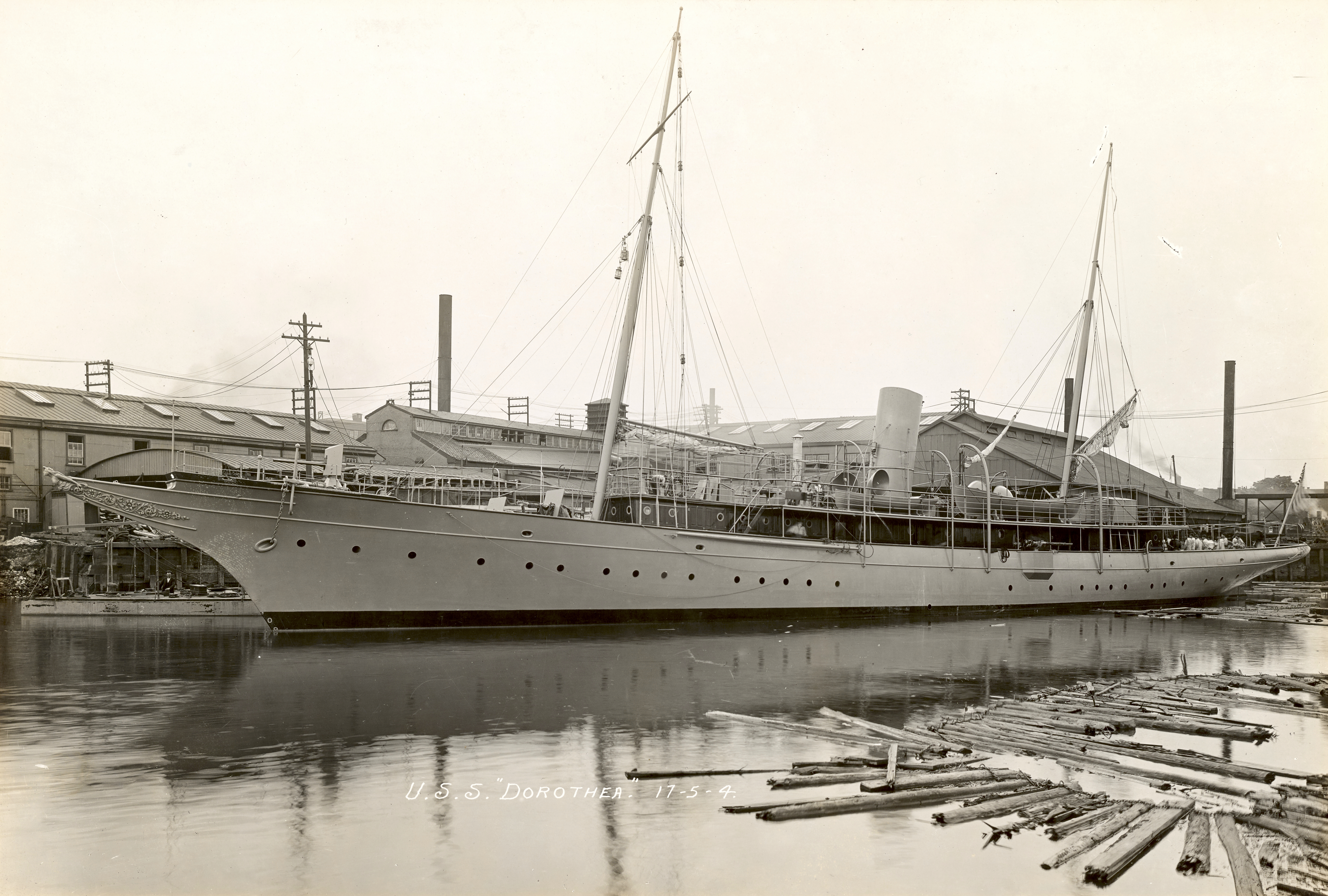
- USS Dorothea (1898–1919)

History

United States
- Name: Dorothea
- Builder: William Cramp & Sons, Philadelphia, Pennsylvania
- Laid down: 1897
- Acquired: by purchase, 21 May 1898
- Commissioned: 1 June 1898
- Decommissioned: 23 June 1919
- Stricken: 20 November 1919
- Fate: Sold 1919

General characteristics
- Type: Gunboat

USS Dorothea, a civilian vessel that retained her original name when purchased by the Navy for use as a gunboat, was the only ship of the United States Navy to bear that name, though other ships have been named Dorothea L. Dix, Dorothy Cullen, and Dorothy.

Her keel was laid down in 1897 by William Cramp & Sons in Philadelphia. She was purchased by the Navy on 21 May 1898 and commissioned on 1 June 1898.

== Service history ==
Dorothea put to sea from Philadelphia on 14 June 1898 and patrolled from Key West, Florida, to Havana, Cuba, until returning to Hampton Roads on 28 August. She was placed out of commission on 20 September and remained at Norfolk Navy Yard until January 1900, when she was taken to League Island. There she was briefly in commission from 1–24 October. In May 1901, she was loaned to the Illinois Naval Militia and was taken through the St. Lawrence River to Chicago. In 1909, she was transferred to the Ohio Naval Militia and was based at Cleveland. She was placed in full commission there on 20 April 1917 following American entry into World War I and sailed on 2 July for duty on the East Coast. The ship's company of Dorothea was the first Ohio National Guard unit activated for service in the First World War.

Arriving at Key West, Florida on 10 August 1917, Dorothea patrolled in Mexican waters and along the U.S. Gulf Coast until 1918. On 8 January, she sailed from New Orleans for Havana, Cuba, where she served in the instruction of Cuban naval officers, returning to Key West for stores and repairs occasionally. From 13 November 1918, Dorothea served as a transport in Cuban, Puerto Rican, and Dominican waters, operating briefly under the command of Harry Shepard Knapp, the military governor of Santo Domingo. She arrived at New Orleans on 30 May 1919, was decommissioned on 23 June, and was sold on 20 November.
