= USS Reuben James (DD-245) =

Clemson-class destroyer of the US Navy

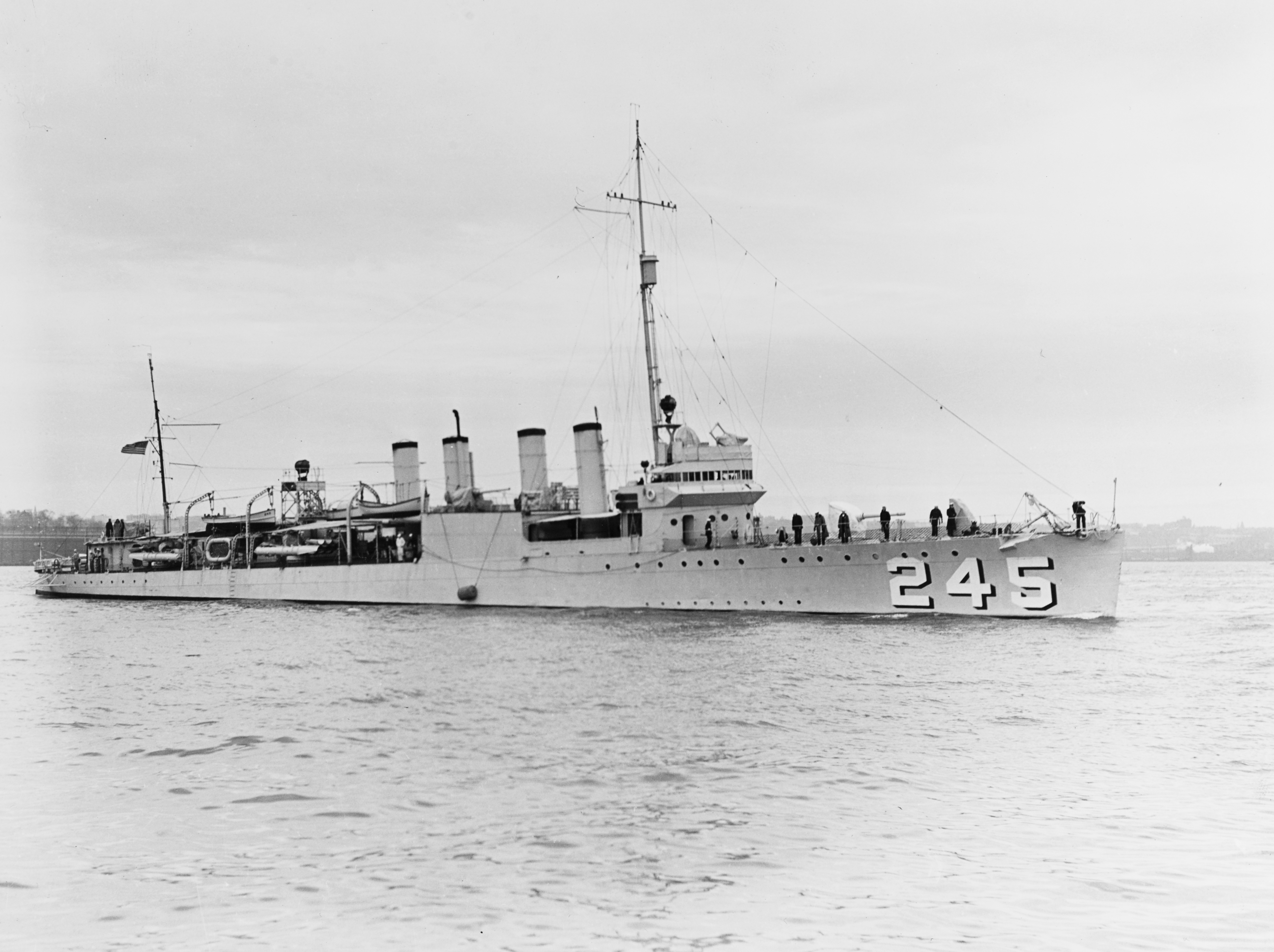
- USS Reuben James on 29 April 1939

History

United States
- Name: Reuben James
- Namesake: Reuben James
- Builder: New York Shipbuilding
- Laid down: 2 April 1919
- Launched: 4 October 1919
- Commissioned: 24 September 1920
- In service: 24 September 1920
- Out of service: 31 October 1941
- Stricken: 25 March 1942
- Fate: Sunk 31 October 1941 51°59′N 27°05′W

General characteristics
- Class & type: Clemson-class destroyer
- Displacement: 1,215 long tons (1,234 t)
- Length: 314 ft 5 in (95.83 m)
- Beam: 31 ft 8 in (9.65 m)
- Draft: 9 ft 4 in (2.84 m)
- Installed power: 26,500 shp (19,800 kW)
- Propulsion: 2 × geared steam turbines; 2 × shafts
- Speed: 35 kn (40 mph; 65 km/h)
- Range: 4,900 nmi (5,600 mi; 9,100 km) at 15 kn (17 mph; 28 km/h)
- Complement: 159 officers and enlisted
- Armament: 4 × 4 in (100 mm) guns; 1 × 3 in (76 mm) antiaircraft gun; 12 × 21 in (533 mm) torpedo tubes

USS Reuben James (DD-245) was a four-funnel Clemson-class destroyer that was constructed after World War I. She was the first United States Navy ship to be named after Boatswain's Mate Reuben James (c. 1776–1838), who had distinguished himself fighting in the First Barbary War, and was the first US navy ship to be sunk by hostile action in the European Theater of World War II. Four US flagged merchant ships were also sunk by hostile action before the attack on Pearl Harbor.

Reuben James was laid down on 2 April 1919 by the New York Shipbuilding Corporation of Camden, New Jersey, launched on 4 October 1919, and commissioned on 24 September 1920. The destroyer was sunk by a torpedo attack from German submarine U-552 near Iceland on 31 October 1941, resulting in the deaths of 100 crewmembers, before the United States had officially joined the war.

== Early service history ==
Assigned to the US Atlantic Fleet, Reuben James served in the Mediterranean Sea from 1921 to 1922 after she had left from Newport, Rhode Island, on 30 November 1920, to Zelenika, Yugoslavia, and arrived on 18 December. During the spring and the summer of 1921, she sailed in the Adriatic Sea and the Mediterranean out of Zelenika and Gruž (Dubrovnik), Yugoslavia and assisted refugees and participated in postwar investigations and the Allied occupation of the eastern Adriatic. In October 1921 at Le Havre, she joined the protected cruiser Olympia at ceremonies marking the return of the Unknown Soldier to the United States. At Danzig, from 29 October 1921 to 3 February 1922, she assisted the American Relief Administration in its efforts to relieve hunger and misery. After duty in the Mediterranean, she departed Gibraltar on 17 July.

Then based at New York City, she patrolled the coast of Nicaragua to prevent the delivery of weapons to revolutionaries in early 1926. During the spring of 1929, she participated in fleet maneuvers that helped develop naval airpower. She was decommissioned at Philadelphia on 20 January 1931. She was recommissioned on 9 March 1932 and started operating again in the Atlantic Ocean and the Caribbean Sea by patrolling Cuban waters during the coup by Fulgencio Batista. She transferred to San Diego in 1934. After maneuvers that evaluated aircraft carriers, she returned to the Atlantic Fleet in January 1939.

== World War II ==
At the beginning of World War II in Europe in September 1939, Reuben James was assigned to the Neutrality Patrol, which guarded the Atlantic and the Caribbean approaches to the American coast. In March 1941, she joined the force established to escort convoys sailing to Great Britain. The force escorted convoys as far as Iceland, after which the convoys became the responsibility of British escorts. The force was based at Hvalfjörður, Iceland, and commanded by Lieutenant Commander Heywood Lane Edwards, the commander of Reuben James. On 23 October she sailed from Naval Station Argentia, Newfoundland, with four other destroyers, escorting eastbound Convoy HX 156.

=== Sinking ===
At dawn on 31 October 1941, she was torpedoed near Iceland by German submarine U-552 commanded by Kapitänleutnant Erich Topp. Reuben James had positioned herself between an ammunition ship in the convoy and the known position of a German "wolfpack," a group of submarines poised to attack the convoy. The destroyer was not flying the ensign of the United States and was in the process of dropping depth charges on another U-boat when she was engaged. Reuben James was hit forward by a torpedo meant for a merchant ship and her entire bow was blown off when a magazine exploded. The bow sank immediately. The aft section floated for five minutes before going down. Of a crew of seven officers and 136 enlisted men, plus one enlisted passenger, 100 were killed. Only 44 enlisted men and no officers survived.

== Convoys escorted ==
| Convoy | Escort Group | Dates | Notes |
|---|---|---|---|
| ON 20 | | 30 September–9 October 1941 | from Iceland to Newfoundland prior to US declaration of war |
| HX 156 | | 24–31 October 1941 | from Newfoundland to Iceland prior to US declaration of war; sunk by U-552 |

== Awards ==
- Second Nicaraguan Campaign Medal
- American Defense Service Medal with "FLEET" clasp and "A" device

== In popular culture ==
=== Music ===
- Woody Guthrie wrote the song "The Sinking of the Reuben James" and performed it with Pete Seeger and the other Almanac Singers. The Guthrie song has an original tune for its chorus, but its verses are set to the tune of the song "Wildwood Flower". Seeger later also performed the song with The Weavers.
- Johnny Horton performed Guthrie's song on his album Johnny Horton Makes History.
- The Kingston Trio released a version of Guthrie's song on numerous albums.
- The Chad Mitchell Trio released a version of Guthrie's song on the album Reflecting.

=== Literature ===
- William Boyd in his novel Restless refers to the sinking of the ship, although he claims that the dead numbered 115.

=== Stamps ===
- The United States Postal Service issued a commemorative stamp in 1991 as part of the set WWII, 1941: A World at War.

=== Television ===
- In the episode of Foyle's War entitled "Invasion", an American army officer (Jay Benedict) states that his motive for joining up even before the Japanese attack on Pearl Harbor was the death of his brother on the Reuben James.

== See also ==
- USS Greer (DD-145)
- USS Kearny (DD-432)
- USS Panay incident
