= USCGC Cayuga =

Lake-class cutter of the United States Coast Guard

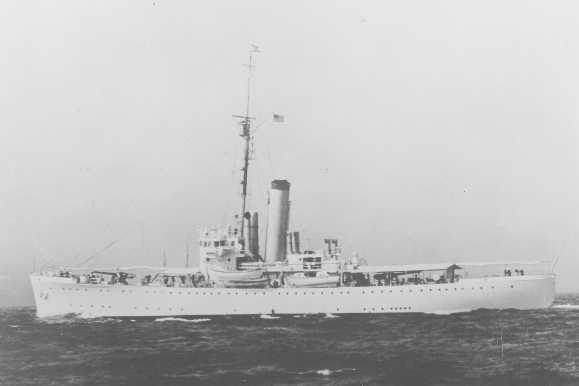
- USCGC Cayuga underway, circa 1936

History

United States
- Name: USCGC Cayuga
- Namesake: Lake Cayuga
- Builder: United Shipyards, Inc.
- Launched: 7 October 1931
- Commissioned: 22 March 1932
- Decommissioned: 12 May 1941
- Fate: Transferred to Royal Navy; 12 May 1941

United Kingdom
- Name: HMS Totland
- Namesake: Totland Bay
- Launched: 7 Oct 1931
- Commissioned: 12 May 1941
- Decommissioned: May 1946
- Identification: Y88
- Fate: Returned to USCG; May 1946

United States
- Name: USCGC Mocoma
- Namesake: Mocoma
- Recommissioned: 20 March 1947
- Decommissioned: 8 May 1950
- Identification: WPG-163
- Fate: Sold on 15 July 1955

General characteristics
- Class & type: Lake-class cutter (USCG); Banff-class sloop (RN)
- Displacement: 2,075 long tons (2,108 t)
- Length: 250 ft (76 m)
- Draft: 12 feet 11 inches (3.94 m)
- Propulsion: 1 × General Electric turbine-driven 3,350 shp (2,500 kW) electric motor, 2 boilers
- Speed: 14.8 kn (27.4 km/h; 17.0 mph) cruising; 17.5 kn (32.4 km/h; 20.1 mph) maximum
- Complement: 97 (in 1940)
- Armament: 1 × 5 inch gun; 1 × 3 inch gun; 2 × 6-pounder (57 mm)

USCGC Cayuga was a Lake-class cutter of the United States Coast Guard launched on 7 October 1931 and commissioned on 22 March 1932. She was transferred to the Royal Navy where she served as HMS Totland (Y88), a Banff-class sloop from 1941 to 1946. After being returned to the USCG in 1946, she was recommissioned as USCGC Mocoma 20 March 1947.

== Career ==
=== Coast Guard – Cayuga ===
Cayuga served the USCG for nine years in New London, Connecticut and was responsible for ice breaking in Buzzards Bay. On 5 April 1941, President Franklin D. Roosevelt transferred ten 250-foot cutters from the United States Coast Guard to the United Kingdom as part of the Lend-Lease Act.

=== Royal Navy – Totland ===
After being commissioned 12 May 1941, Totland sailed to England with convoy HX 128. After a refit on the River Thames, Totland escorted convoys OS 4, SL 89, OS 12, SL 95, OS 17, SL 100, OS 22, SL 106, OS 28, SL 112, OS 40, and SL 124 with the 42nd Escort Group before being assigned to Operation Torch. After escorting convoys KMF 3, MKF 3, KMF 5, MKF 5, KMF 7 and MKF 7 in support of the North African invasion, Totland sank U-522 on 23 February 1943 while escorting the tanker convoys UC 1 and CU 1. Totland then escorted convoys between Freetown and Lagos via Sekondi-Takoradi until transferred to the Kilindini Escort Force in July 1944. Totland began a prolonged refit in October 1944 until the decision to retire her in May 1945.

=== Coast Guard – Mocoma ===
After service in the Royal Navy, she was returned to the USCG in 1946. After reconditioning, 20 March 1947 she was recommissioned as USCGC Mocoma (WPG-163) and was placed in service to be stationed in Miami, Florida where she remained until her decommissioning on 8 May 1950. She was later sold on 15 July 1955 to an unknown party.

== See also ==
- List of United States Coast Guard cutters
