= HMS Vetch =

Flower-class corvette

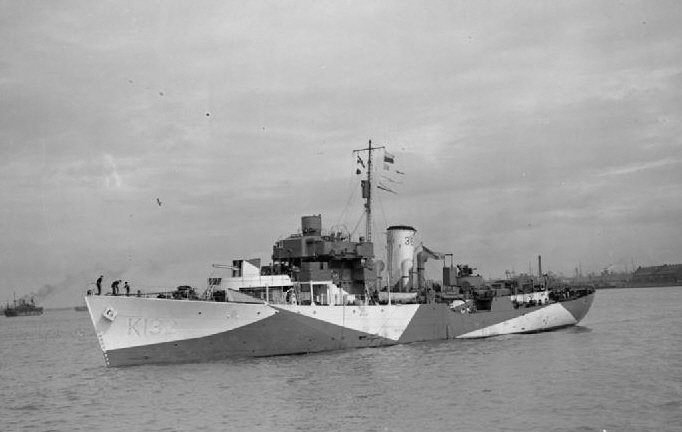
- HMS Vetch in coastal waters off Liverpool

History

United Kingdom
- Name: HMS Vetch
- Ordered: 12 December 1939
- Builder: Smiths Dock Company, Middlesbrough
- Laid down: 15 March 1941
- Launched: 27 May 1941
- Commissioned: 11 August 1941
- Decommissioned: 29 June 1945
- Out of service: Sold in August 1945
- Renamed: Patrai in 1945; Olympic Hunter in 1951; Otori Maru No.18 in 1956
- Reclassified: Merchant vessel in 1945
- Refit: Liverpool: 8 May – 13 August 1942
- Identification: Pennant number: K132
- Fate: Scrapped

General characteristics
- Class & type: Flower-class corvette
- Displacement: 1,060 tons
- Length: 205 ft (62 m)
- Beam: 33 ft (10 m)
- Draught: 16.6 ft (5.1 m)
- Propulsion: Two cylindrical fire tube boilers; vertical triple-expansion steam engine
- Speed: 16 knots (30 km/h) at 2,750 hp (2,050 kW)
- Range: 3,500 nautical miles at 12 knots (6,500 km at 22 km/h)
- Complement: 85 men
- Armament: 1 × BL 4 inch Mk IX naval gun, 1 × QF 2-pounder naval gun, 4 × Oerlikon 20 mm cannon; 2 × stern depth charge racks with 40 depth charges; 1 × Hedgehog A/S mortar

HMS Vetch (K132) was a Flower-class corvette that served in the Royal Navy during the Second World War. After helping to escort many convoys and sinking two U-boats, she was decommissioned and sold in 1945.

== Ordering and construction ==
As part of the 1939 War Programme, HMS Vetch was ordered on 12 December 1939 from Smiths Dock Company Limited of Middlesbrough. The ship was not laid down until 15 March 1941 but she was quickly launched on 27 May 1941 and commissioned into the Royal Navy on 11 August 1941.

== War service ==
In October 1941 Vetch was assigned to the 36th Escort Group (36 EG) based at Liverpool, part of Western Approaches Command. Between 20 August and 4 September the ship underwent sea trials at Tobermory and her first convoy escort duty was with OG 74 between 13 and 27 September 1941 (which included 27 ships plus the first escort carrier, Audacity and the Ocean Boarding Vessel, Corinthian which was continuing on into the South Atlantic).

OG 74 was protected by the sloop Deptford and other corvettes (Arbutus, Marigold and Pentstemon). The convoy was spotted by a U-boat on 20 September which shadowed and reported the convoy's position to German headquarters. An aircraft from Audacity forced this U-boat to dive and the submarine was also attacked by Deptford and Arbutus (these vessels were relieved by destroyers and rejoined the convoy). Other U-boats were now directed against the convoy and two merchant ships were sunk and during an emergency turn four merchant vessels became detached from the convoy. On 21 September, a German long-range Condor aircraft located the convoy and bombed and sank the Walmer Castle. Audacity launched Martlet aircraft which managed to shoot down the German aircraft.

Vetch arrived at Gibraltar on 27 September and 36 Escort Group remained there whilst escorting convoys HG 74 and OG 76 between 2 October and 11 November 1941. Whilst during offensive sweeps around Gibraltar, Vetch picked up and attacked a submarine contact on 6 December approximately 15 miles from Tarifa Point.

=== Convoy HG 76 ===
76 HG was now led by Commander "Johnnie" Walker in HMS Stork. A large convoy, HG 76, consisting of 32 ships which sailed on 14 December 1941 from Gibraltar. Protection was from Audacity again and the sloops Stork and Deptford plus the corvettes Vetch, Convolvulus, Marigold, Pentstemon, Rhododendron and Samphire. Also detailed were Hunt-class destroyers HMS Blankney and HMS Exmoor as well as Town-class destroyer HMS Stanley.

Walker introduced new methods to combat the U-boat threat and successfully used Audacity's aircraft to locate submarines which were then attacked. During the convoy's journey five U-boats were sunk (U-127, U-131, U-434, U-574 and U-567) as well as two Condor aircraft, but the losses were heavy – Audacity (lost 21 December), Stanley (lost 19 December) and two merchant ships were sunk.

In April 1942 Vetch had been fitted with Type 271 radar with which, while escorting convoy OG 82 in the North Atlantic south-west of Ireland, she detected U-252 which she then sank with the help of Stork.

36 EG was disbanded in June 1942 and Vetch continued with other escort groups until 1944. On 25 May 1943, while escorting a convoy to Algiers, she sank U-414 in the western Mediterranean north of Oran. She remained in the Mediterranean escorting convoys in support of Operation Husky.

On 29 June 1945, the Vetch arrived at Gibraltar and was put in navy reserve. On 23 August 1945 she was loaned to the Greek government and renamed Patrai.

== Civilian service ==
The Greeks sold Patrai in 1951 and the vessel was renamed Olympic Hunter. In 1956 she was resold as the Otori Maru No.18 and sailed until 1966 when she was finally scrapped.
