= Gibraltar convoys of World War II =

- Part of World War II
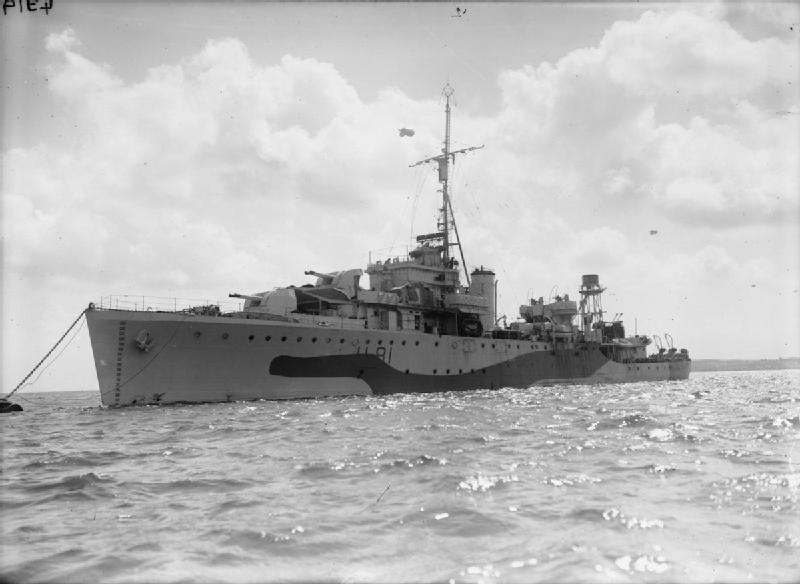
- Sloop HMS Stork was one of the more successful Gibraltar convoy escorts.
| Date | September 1939 – May 1945 |
| Location | western North Atlantic Ocean |

Belligerents
| United Kingdom; Free France; Canada | Germany; Italy |

The Gibraltar convoys of World War II were oceangoing trade convoys of merchant ships sailing between Gibraltar and the United Kingdom. Gibraltar convoy routes crossed U-boat transit routes from French Atlantic ports and were within range of Axis maritime patrol aircraft making these convoys vulnerable to observation and interception by bombers, submarines, and surface warships during the Battle of the Atlantic. OG convoys brought supplies from the United Kingdom to Gibraltar from September 1939 until September 1942. Beginning with Operation Torch, OG convoys were replaced by KM convoys transporting military personnel and supplies from the United Kingdom to and past Gibraltar into the Mediterranean Sea. HG convoys brought food, raw materials, and later empty ships from Gibraltar to the United Kingdom from September 1939 until September 1942. After Operation Torch, HG convoys were replaced by MK convoys returning mostly empty ships from the Mediterranean to the United Kingdom. KM and MK convoys ended in 1945.

== Background ==
The Battle of the Atlantic was fought around merchant ships carrying supplies to and from the British Isles. While HX convoys, ON convoys, SC convoys, and CU convoys sailed to or from North America, Gibraltar convoys carried supplies on the traditional trade route with the remainder of the British Empire through the Mediterranean Sea, Suez Canal, Red Sea, and Indian Ocean. Proximity to Francoist Spain and Fascist Italy made this traditional trade route vulnerable to hostile observation and interception. Protection of this shipping route was similarly important to France for trade with colonial North Africa, Syria, Lebanon, Madagascar, and Indochina. Gibraltar convoys were escorted by French warships until the surrender of France. Most shipping to and from the Indian Ocean and the eastern Mediterranean was diverted around Africa until the surrender of Italy. OG and KM convoys consisted largely of supplies for the military garrisons and civilian populations of Gibraltar and Malta, and for Operations Torch and Husky. The proximity of this convoy route to U-boat bases in occupied France caused frequent overlap of convoy battles with Allied offensive patrols in the Bay of Biscay. Air cover was flown from Cornwall and Gibraltar when conditions allowed, but an "air gap" remained where U-boats and surface raiders could patrol the convoy routes unobserved until air patrols began flying from the Azores in October 1943.

== HG convoys ==
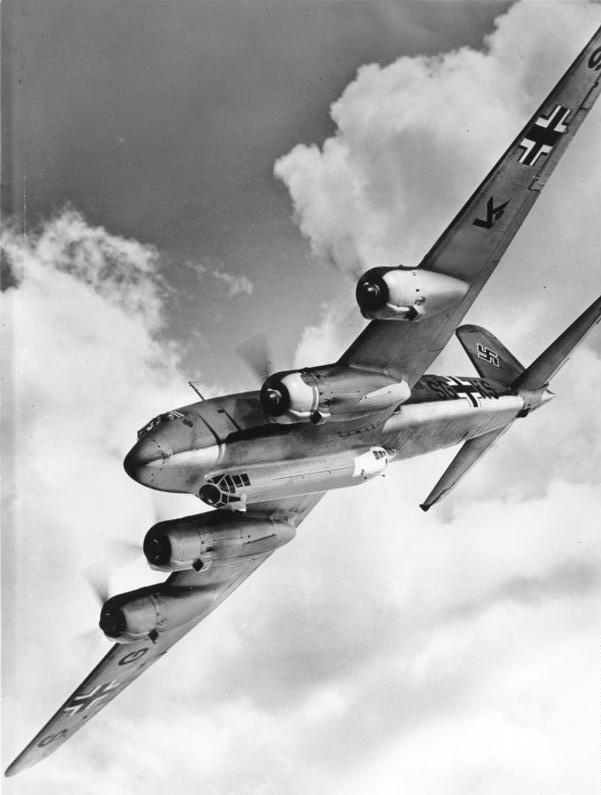
Gibraltar convoys were observed and attacked by bombers of KG 40

On the basis of World War I experience, trade convoys Homeward bound from Gibraltar were one of four convoy routes organized shortly after the declaration of war. The other routes were HX convoys from North America, SL convoys from the South Atlantic, and a short-lived series of HN convoys from Norway. Convoy HG 1 left Gibraltar on 26 September 1939 to arrive in Liverpool on 6 October. Early convoys were escorted by French warships to the vicinity of Ushant where ships bound for east coast ports detached to proceed through the English Channel until the surrender of France in June 1940. Convoys HG 7, HG 8, and HG 9 originated in Port Said; but routing through the Mediterranean was discontinued with convoy HG 10 assembling at Gibraltar on 8 December 1939. Twenty-eight ships of convoy HG 13 sailed from Gibraltar on 31 December, two days after a fast section of 10 ships sailed as convoy HG(F) 13 or HG 13(F). Subsequent convoys sailed with separate fast sections until convoy HG 34(F) on 13 June 1940. The loss of French escorts caused most subsequent convoys to sail as a single section. Convoy HG 89 left Gibraltar on 19 September 1942 and arrived in Liverpool on 30 September as the last convoy of the series which ended prior to Operation Torch. They were replaced by MKS convoys after Operation Torch.

== OG convoys ==
From 7 September 1939, shortly after the outbreak of World War II, OB convoys sailed from Liverpool south through St George's Channel to the open Atlantic. Off Land's End the convoy would be joined by an OA convoy from London on the River Thames via the English Channel. The combined OA/OB convoys were escorted for about four days. After detaching ships bound for more distant locations, ships Outbound to Gibraltar would form an OG convoy off Ushant to be escorted south by French warships recently escorting a northbound HG convoy. Convoy OG 1 formed on 2 October 1939 and reached Gibraltar on 8 October. Convoy OG 4 was the only one of the series to continue through the Mediterranean to reach Port Said on 8 November 1939. Separate fast sections began with convoy OG 13(F) on 1 January 1940 and ended with convoy OG 34(F) on 17 June 1940. Beginning with convoy OG 38 on 17 July 1940, convoys assembled at Liverpool following the surrender of France. The series was interrupted by Operation Torch. Convoy OG 89 left Liverpool on 31 August 1942 as the last of the series until convoys OG 90 thru OG 95 sailed combined with their replacement KMS convoys a year later.

== MKS convoys ==
Slow convoys returning from the Mediterranean to the United Kingdom after Operation Torch were designated MKS replacing the former HG series. The first MKS convoys were ships returning from Operation Torch. MKS 1 sailed from Gibraltar on 21 November 1942 and reached Liverpool on 30 November. Convoy MKS 12 sailed from Bône on 22 April 1943 and merged with convoy SL 128 to be designated SL 128/MKS 12. All subsequent MKS convoys merged with an SL convoy with a similar joint designation until SL 178/MKS 69 marked the end of the SL series in November 1944. The MKS series continued until convoy MKS 103 reached Liverpool on 1 June 1945.

== KMS convoys ==
Slow ships from the United Kingdom to the Mediterranean formed KMS convoys. Convoy KMS 1 was part of Operation Torch leaving the Firth of Clyde on 22 October 1942 to reach Algiers on 8 November. Convoy KMS 13 sailed as part of convoy OS 46 (designated OS 46/KMS 13) to detach off Gibraltar on 24 April 1943. All subsequent KMS convoys received similar joint designations sailing as part of OS convoys and destinations reached as far east as Port Said. The last was convoy OS 124/KMS 98 reaching Gibraltar on 27 April 1945.

== KMF convoys ==
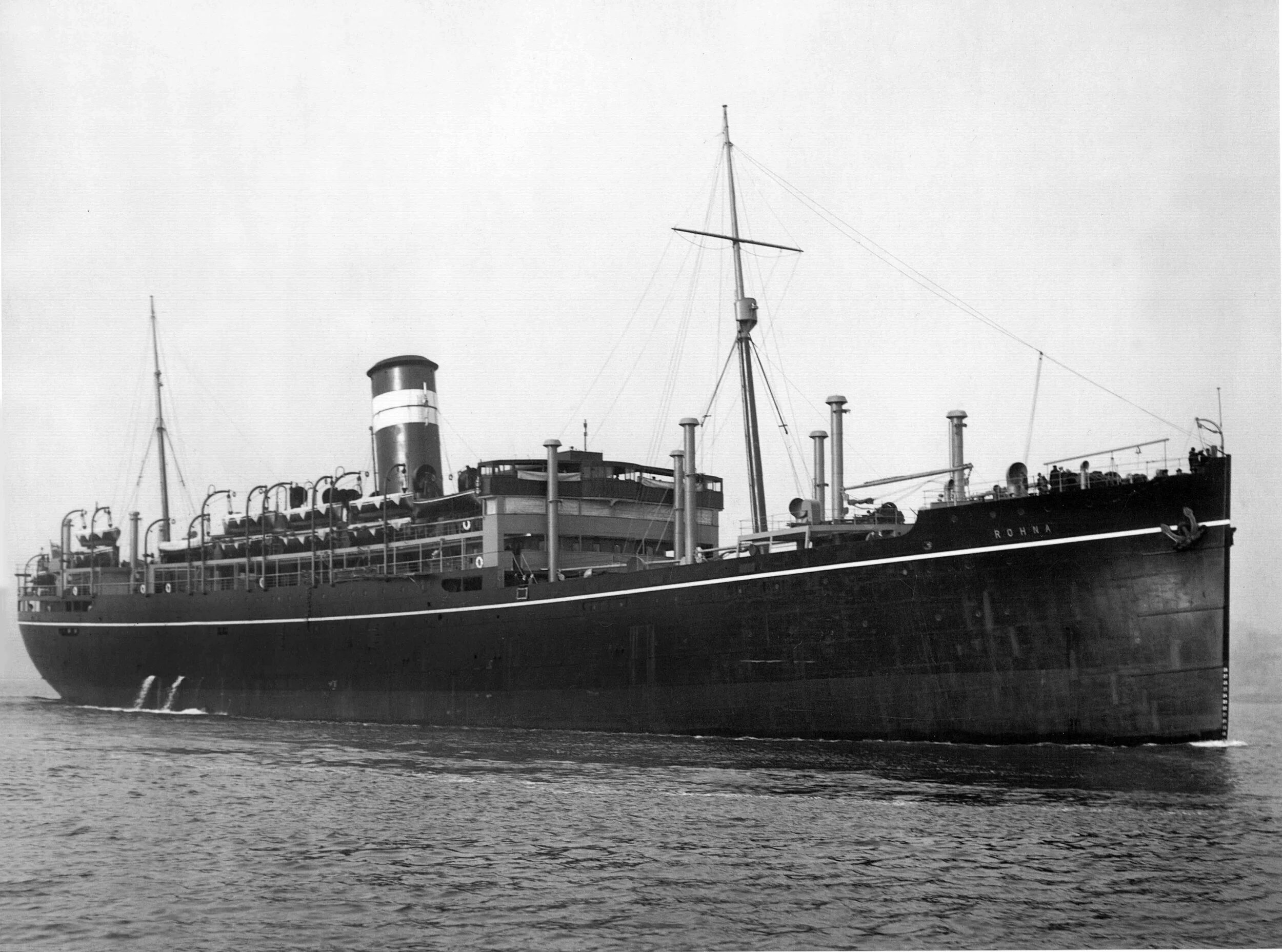
1,149 men died when HMT Rohna was sunk by a Luftwaffe glide bomb while sailing with convoy KMF 26.

Fast ships from the United Kingdom to the Mediterranean formed KMF convoys. Convoy KMF 1 was the Operation Torch invasion convoy leaving the Firth of Clyde on 26 October 1942 to reach Oran on 8 November. U-562 sank the 23,722-ton troopship Strathhallan from convoy KMF 5 on 22 December 1942; and aircraft sank the 19,141-ton Windsor Castle from convoy KMF 11 on 22 March 1943. Destinations moved eastward until convoy KMF 22 reached Port Said on 29 August 1943. As the Mediterranean became more secure, KMF convoys included troopships carrying soldiers to the Indian Ocean. German aircraft sank three troopships from these convoys. The 9,135-ton Santa Elena and the 19,335-ton Marnix van St. Aldegonde were sunk from convoy KMF 25 on 6 November, and the 8,602-ton Rohna from convoy KMF 26 on 26 November 1943. The last convoy of this series was convoy KMF 45 leaving the Firth of Clyde on 23 May 1945.

== MKF convoys ==
Fast ships returning from the Mediterranean to the United Kingdom formed MKF convoys. The only losses from MKF convoys were two troopships and an Aircraft Carrier from convoy MKF 1 returning through the Atlantic from Operation Torch. U-413 sank the 20,107-ton Warwick Castle on 14 November 1942 and U-155 sank the 11,279-ton Ettrick on 15 November as well as the Aircraft Carrier HMS Avenger. The last convoy of this series was convoy MKF 45 reaching Liverpool on 8 June 1945.

== Notable convoys ==
- HG 3 lost three ships torpedoed by U-boats on 17 October 1939.
- OG 16 lost Armanistan torpedoed by U-25 on 3 February 1940.
- OG 18 lost Pyrrhus torpedoed by U-37 on 17 February 1940.
- OG 19 lost British Endeavor torpedoed by U-50 on 22 February 1940.
- HG 31 lost Orangemoor torpedoed by U-101 on 31 May 1940.
- HG 34 lost four ships torpedoed by U-boats in June 1940.
- OG 46 lost Jeanne M torpedoed by U-37 on 2 December 1940.
- OG 47 lost Mangen torpedoed by the Italian submarine Mocenigo on 20 December 1940.
- HG 49 lost the convoy rescue ship Beachy bombed by aircraft on 11 January 1941.
- HG 50 lost Mostyn bombed by aircraft on 23 January 1941.
- HG 53 was one of the few Atlantic convoys to have ships sunk by submarines, by aircraft, and by surface ships. (February 1941)
- HG 61 lost Empire Ridge torpedoed by U-96 on 19 May 1941.
- OG 63 lost two ships torpedoed by the Italian submarine Marconi and a third ship bombed by aircraft on 6 June 1941.
- OG 69 was discovered by KG 40 bombers and lost seven ships torpedoed by U-boats in July 1941.
- HG 70 was attacked by ten U-boats, but in the end lost only 1 ship to aircraft.
- OG 71 was discovered by KG 40 bombers and lost ten ships torpedoed by U-boats in August 1941.
- OG 74 lost two ships torpedoed by U-124 on 20 September 1941.
- HG 73 was discovered by KG 40 bombers and lost nine ships torpedoed by U-boats and Italian submarines in September 1941.
- HG 75 lost four ships torpedoed by U-boats in October 1941.

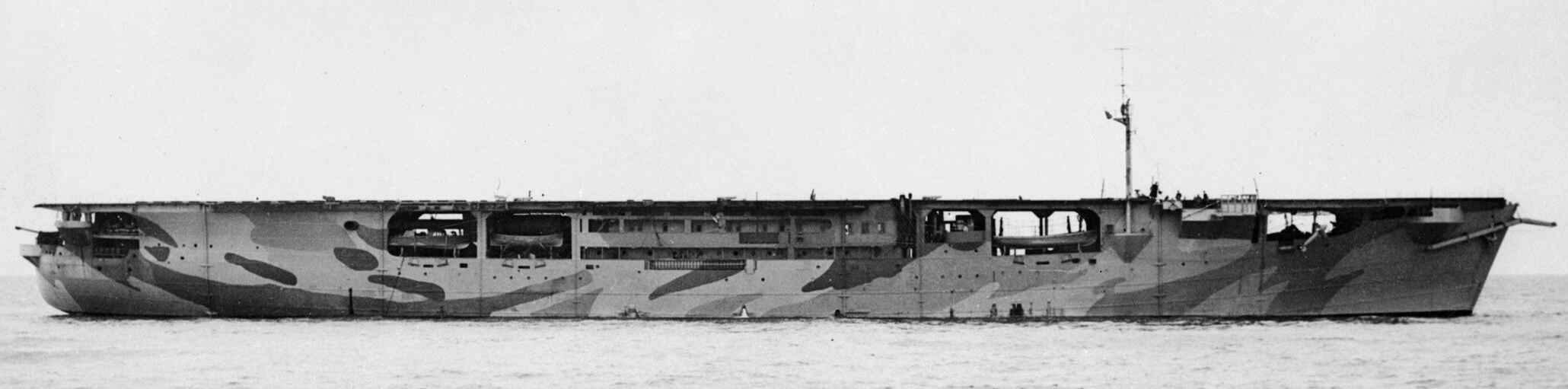
HMS Audacity lost from convoy HG 76.

- HG 76 lost the first escort carrier HMS Audacity in December 1941.
- OG 82 escorts sank U-252 without losing any ships.
- HG 84 lost five ships torpedoed by U-boats and one escort bombed by aircraft in June 1942.

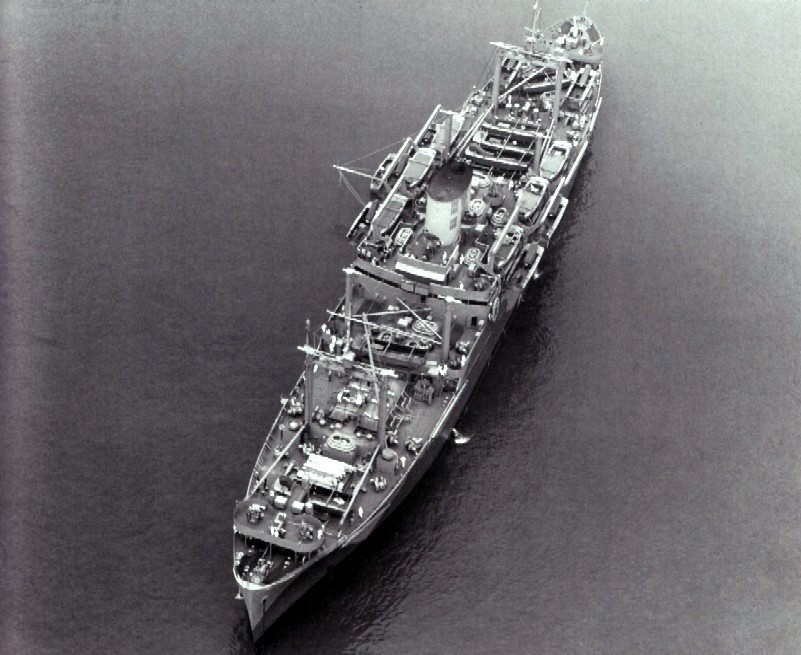
USS Thomas Stone lost from convoy KMF 1.

- KMF 1 was the Operation Torch invasion convoy and lost USS Thomas Stone torpedoed in the Mediterranean on 7 November 1942.
- KMS 2 lost Browning torpedoed by U-593 on 11 November 1942.
- MKF 1 was the only MKF convoy to lose ships. Two troopships were torpedoed by submarines returning from Operation Torch on 14 and 15 November 1942.
- KMS 3 lost two ships torpedoed by U-263 on 20 November 1942 and another bombed by aircraft four days later.
- KMF 5 lost Strathallan torpedoed by U-562 on 22 December 1942.
- KMS 6 lost two ships bombed by aircraft on 7 January 1943.
- KMS 7 lost Jean Jadot torpedoed by U-453 on 20 January 1943.
- KMS 8 lost two ships torpedoed by U-77 on 7 February 1943 and escort HMCS Louisburg was sunk by aircraft.
- KMS 9 escorting aircraft sank U-620 on 14 February 1943.
- KMS 10 lost Fort Battle River torpedoed by U-410 on 6 March 1943 after escorts sank U-87 on 4 March.
- KMF 11 lost Windsor Castle bombed by aircraft on 22 March 1943.
- KMS 11 lost three ships bombed by aircraft in March 1943.
- SL 128/MKS 12 lost Laconikos torpedoed by U-89 on 7 May 1943.
- KMS 14 lost Empire Eve torpedoed by U-414 on 18 May 1943.
- SL 129/MKS 13 lost Alpera bombed by aircraft on 22 May 1943.
- SL 131/MKS 15 lost two ships bombed by aircraft on 23 June 1943.
- KMS 18 was an Operation Husky invasion convoy and lost three ships torpedoed by U-375 and U-593 on 4 and 5 July 1943.
- MKF 19 escorts sank U-409 on 12 July 1943.
- OS 52/KMS 21 lost two ships bombed by aircraft on 26 and 27 July 1943.
- OS 58/KMS 32 lost Warfield bombed by aircraft on 15 August 1943.
- MKF 22 escorts sank U-458 on 22 August 1943.
- SL 135/MKS 22 escort sank U-634 on 30 August 1943.
- KMS 26 lost Richard Olney to a mine on 22 September 1943.
- KMS 27 lost Stanmore torpedoed by U-223 on 2 October 1943.
- SL 138/MKS 28 lost SS Tivives torpedoed by German aircraft off Cape Ténès on 21 October, and Hallfried torpedoed by U-262 on 31 October 1943, while escorts sank U-306.
- KMS 30 lost Mont Viso torpedoed by U-593 on 3 November 1943.
- KMF 25 lost two ships bombed by aircraft on 6 November 1943.
- SL 139/MKS 30 escorts sank three U-boats in November 1943, and U-boats shot down two bombers.
- KMS 31 lost four ships bombed by aircraft on 11 November 1943.
- SL 140/MKS 31 escorts sank three U-boats in November 1943, and U-boats shot down two bombers.
- KMF 26 lost Rohna bombed by aircraft on 26 November 1943.
- OS 62/KMS 36 lost HMS Hurricane torpedoed by U-415 on 24 December 1943.
- OS 64/KMS 38 lost HMS Tweed torpedoed by U-305 on 3 January 1944, and U-270 shot down a bomber.
- KMS 37 lost two ships bombed by aircraft on 10 January 1944.
- OS 65/KMS 39 escort sank U-641 on 19 January 1944.
- SL 147/MKS 38 escorts sank five U-boats in January 1944.
- SL 149/MKS 40 lost LST-362 torpedoed by U-744 on 2 March 1944.
- SL 150/MKS 41 lost HMS Asphodel torpedoed by U-575 on 6 March 1944.
- KMS 51 lost Norderflinge bombed by aircraft on 30 May 1944.
- KMS 76 lost Black Heath torpedoed by U-870 on 10 January 1945.
- OS 115/KMS 89 lost Lornaston torpedoed by U-275 on 8 March 1945.

== Bibliography ==
- Blair, Clay (1996). Hitler's U-Boat War: The Hunters 1939–1942. Vol. 1 (First ed.). New York: Random House. ISBN 0-394-58839-8.
- Blair, Clay (1998). Hitler's U-Boat War: The Hunted 1942–1945. Vol. 2. New York: Random House. ISBN 0-679-45742-9.
- Edwards, Bernard (1999). Dönitz and the Wolf Packs. Brockhampton Press. ISBN 1-86019-927-5.
- Hague, Arnold (2000). The Allied Convoy System 1939–1945. Chatham. ISBN 1-86176-147-3.
- Kemp, Peter (1978). Decision at Sea: The Convoy Escorts. New York: E.P. Dutton. ISBN 0-525-93004-3.
- MacIntyre, Donald (1971). The Naval War Against Hitler. New York: Charles Scribner's Sons. ISBN 9780684123752.
- Rohwer, J; Hummelchen, G (1992). Chronology of the War at Sea 1939–1945. Annapolis, MD: Naval Institute Press. ISBN 1-55750-105-X.
- van der Vat, Dan (1988). The Atlantic Campaign. Hodder & Stoughton. ISBN 0-340-37751-8.
- Winton, John (1988). Ultra at Sea (First U.S. ed.). New York: William Morrow and Company. ISBN 0-688-08546-6.
