= HMS Deptford (U53) =

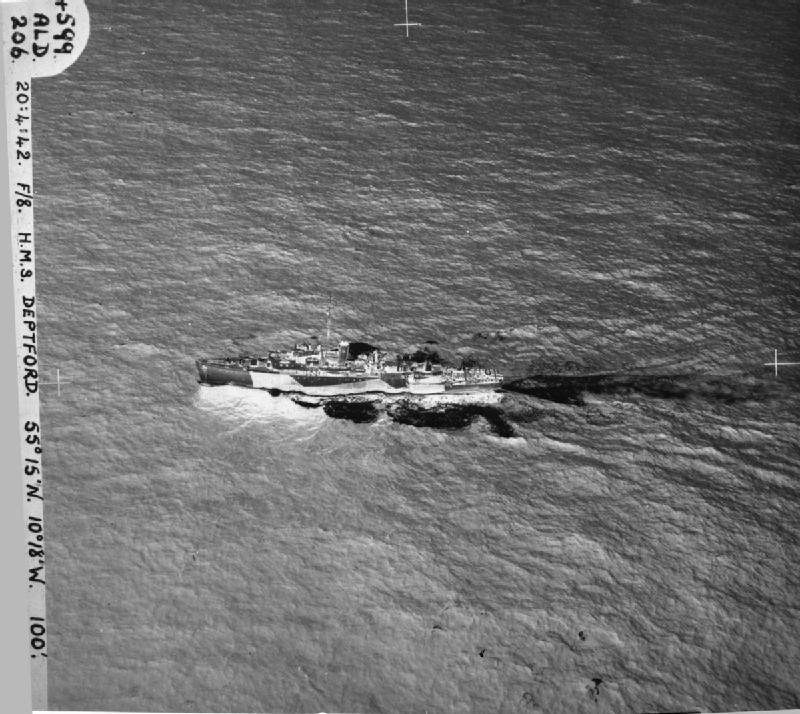
- Aerial view of Deptford in April 1942

History

United Kingdom
- Name: HMS Deptford
- Builder: Chatham Dockyard
- Laid down: 30 April 1934
- Launched: 5 February 1935
- Completed: 20 August 1935
- Decommissioned: July 1945
- Fate: Sold for scrap 3 April 1948

General characteristics
- Class & type: Grimsby-class sloop
- Displacement: 990 long tons (1,010 t) standard
- Length: 266 ft 3 in (81.15 m) o/a
- Beam: 36 ft (11.0 m)
- Draught: 9 ft 6 in (2.90 m) (full load)
- Propulsion: Two Admiralty 3-drum water-tube boilers; Parsons geared steam turbines; Two shafts; 2,000 shp (1,500 kW)
- Speed: 16.5 kn (30.6 km/h; 19.0 mph)
- Range: 6,000 nmi (11,000 km; 6,900 mi) at 10 kn (19 km/h; 12 mph)
- Complement: 100
- Armament: 2 × 4.7 in (120 mm) Mark IX guns; 1 × QF 3 inch 20 cwt anti-aircraft gun; 4 × 3-pounder guns

HMS Deptford was a Grimsby-class sloop of the British Royal Navy. Built at Chatham Dockyard in the 1930s, Deptford was launched in 1935 and commissioned later that year. The ship saw early service on the Persian Gulf station, but the outbreak of the Second World War saw Deptford serving as a convoy escort in the North Atlantic and the Mediterranean, sinking a German U-boat in 1941. She survived the war and was scrapped in 1948.

== Construction and design ==
On 10 January 1934, (Note: Mason states that Deptford was ordered on 1 May 1933.) the British Admiralty ordered a single Grimsby-class sloop, HMS Deptford, to be built at Chatham Dockyard. She was the seventh ship of her class to be ordered, following two ordered in 1932 and four (two for the Royal Navy, one for the Royal Indian Marine and one for the Royal Australian Navy) in 1933. Another ship would be ordered for the Royal Navy later that year, with two more being ordered in 1935, while the Australians ordered another ship in 1935 and a final 2 in 1938. The Grimsby class, while based on the previous Shoreham class, was intended to be a more capable escort vessel than previous sloops, and carried a more powerful armament.

Deptford was laid down on 30 April 1934 and was launched on 5 February 1935. The ship was launched by floating out of a dry dock rather than a conventional launch from a slipway. She was formally commissioned on 14 August 1935, completing construction on 20 August.

Deptford was 266 feet 3 inches (81.15 m) long overall, with a beam of 36 feet (10.97 m) and a draught of 9 feet 6 inches (2.90 m) at deep load. Displacement was 990 long tons (1,010 t) standard, and 1,355 long tons (1,377 t) full load. The ship was powered by two geared steam turbines driving two shafts, fed by two Admiralty 3-drum boilers. This machinery produced 2,000 shaft horsepower (1,500 kW) and could propel the ship to a speed of 16.5 knots (30.6 km/h; 19.0 mph). The ship had a range of 6,000 nautical miles (11,000 km; 6,900 mi) at 10 knots (19 km/h; 12 mph).

Two 4.7 in (120 mm) Mark IX guns were mounted fore and aft on the ship's centreline. As the 4.7 inch guns were low-angle guns, not suited to anti-aircraft use, a single QF 3 inch 20 cwt anti-aircraft gun (Note: "Cwt" is the abbreviation for hundredweight, 20 cwt referring to the weight of the gun.) was mounted in "B" position. Four 3-pounder saluting guns and eight machine guns completed the ship's gun armament. The initial anti-submarine armament was small, with a design loadout of four depth charges. The ship could be fitted for minesweeping or minelaying (for which the aft 4.7 inch gun was removed, allowing 40 mines to be loaded) as well as escort duties. The ship had a crew of 103 officers and men.

=== Modifications ===
Pre-war modifications included the fitting of Sonar in 1938, and the addition of two quadruple .50 in (12.7 mm) anti-aircraft machine guns in 1939.

The outbreak of war brought the addition of depth charge armament, with 40 depth charges initially being fitted, with this later being increased to 60 charges. A Hedgehog anti-submarine mortar was fitted in 1942, replacing the 3 inch anti aircraft gun. The ship's close-in anti-aircraft armament was supplemented by two Oerlikon 20 mm cannon in January 1942, with a further two being fitted in October that year, and two more replacing the .50 in machine guns in 1943.

Type 286 radar was fitted early in the war, which was replaced by Type 271 in March 1942, when HF/DF radio direction-finding gear was also fitted.

== Service ==
On commissioning, Deptford deployed to the Persian Gulf, reaching Muscat on 14 November 1935 where she replaced the old Flower-class sloop Lupin, with Lupin's crew transferring to Deptford. On 4 June 1936, Deptford carried Sheikh Hamad ibn Isa Al Khalifa, the King of Bahrain to Basra on the first step of a state visit to the United Kingdom. She underwent a short docking at Bombay in March 1936, undergoing a more extensive refit at Bombay from September to November that year. Deptford recommissioned with a new crew at Bombay in April 1937, and continued to serve in the Gulf until November that year, when she was refitted again, this time at Columbo in Ceylon (now Sri Lanka). In September 1938 she was refitted at Bombay again, while in November supported three Vickers Wellesley bombers of the RAF flying from Ismalia, Egypt to Darwin, Australia in a successful attempt at the World Flight distance record. Deptford was stationed in the Arabian Sea to act as a navigation waypoint, while the survey ship Investigator and the sloop Swan fulfilled similar roles in the Bay of Bengal and the Timor Sea respectively. It was hoped to carry out a major refit at Malta from May 1939 in which the ship would be re-armed with four QF 4 inch Mk XVI naval guns, but time pressures owing to the threat of war resulted in this refit being cut short and the ship not being rearmed. After this refit she briefly returned to the Persian Gulf station before being reassigned to Singapore, reaching there in August 1939.

The outbreak of the Second World War saw Deptford being ordered back to home waters, reaching Portsmouth on 16 November and joining the 2nd Escort Division based at Liverpool in December. She was deployed in convoy escort duties in the Western Approaches. On 3 February 1940, Deptford was part of the escort for Convoy OB 84 when she collided with the merchant ship Antigua, receiving slight damage. On 22 May, Deptford took part in a search for the German submarine U-37 after U-37 had attacked the merchant ship Dunster Grange. In August 1940 she transferred to Rosyth for escort work in the North Sea and North West Approaches, before returning to Liverpool in November as part of the Sloop Division, and carrying out convoy escort in the Atlantic.

On 9–10 February 1941, Deptford was escorting Convoy HG 53 from Gibraltar to Britain (Note: OG Convoys sailed from Gibraltar to Britain while HG Convoys made the reverse trip from Gibraltar to Britain.) when it came under attack by U-37. Deptford carried out a depth charge attack on U-37 after U-37 torpedoed and sank the merchant ship Brandenburg. U-37 escaped unharmed. Later that month Deptford entered a refit at Liverpool that continued until March, after which she continued escort operations to and from Gibraltar. On 9 August Convoy HG 70 (Note: Rohwer says the convoy involved was HG 69, while Blair and Kindell state HG 70.) set out from Gibraltar for the British Isles. The Germans were warned of the convoy's departure by spies, and the convoy came under heavy submarine attack as a result. Deptford, which was joining the convoy's escort from OG 70, was attacked by the Italian submarine Guglielmo Marconi. While Marconi claimed to have sunk Deptford, the sloop was undamaged. All attacks on the convoy failed with no merchant ships hit. Deptford (by now part of Escort Group 36) took part in the escort of Convoy HG 72 in from 10 to 15 September, and while the convoy came under attack by the Italian submarines Leonardo da Vinci, Morosini, Luigi Torelli and Alessandro Malaspina, the escort repelled the attacks with no losses. The return convoy OG 74's escort included the Escort carrier Audacity as well as Escort Group 36, and on 20 September, one of Audacity's aircraft, together with Deptford and the corvette Arbutus forced the German submarine U-201 to submerge as it approached the convoy. The convoy rescue ship Walmer Castle was badly damaged by a German Focke-Wulf Fw 200 Condor long-range bomber and was scuttled by Deptford and the corvette Marigold on 21 September. On the night of 21/22 September, Deptford and Marigold were detached to help a group of four stragglers from the convoy but could not prevent three being sunk. In total, six ships from OG 74 were sunk.

On 14 December 1941, Deptford left Gibraltar as part of the escort of Convoy HG 76. The convoy came under heavy and sustained attack by German submarines and aircraft, and by 19 December four U-boats (U-127, U-131, U-434 and U-574) had been sunk for the loss of one destroyer (Stanley) and a merchant ship. Shortages of fuel and damage caused a number of ships to leave the escorting force, while the Germans continued to order more submarines into the battle. In order to draw away some of the U-boats, Deptford and several corvettes were ordered to stage a mock battle by firing guns and star shells at a distance from the convoy. The ruse was unsuccessful, however, as it panicked several merchant ships in the convoy to fire off rockets, giving away the convoy's position, which allowed U-567 to sink a merchant ship and U-751 to torpedo and sink Audacity. Later that night, Deptford spotted a surfaced U-boat, and when the submarine dived, carried out a series of depth charge attacks. While Deptford was not credited with a "kill" at the time, she was later found to have destroyed U-567 commanded by Engelbert Endrass. On returning to the convoy after this attack, Deptford collided with the sloop Stork, killing two survivors of the sinking of U-574 aboard Stork.

Deptford was under repair until March 1942 when she rejoined Escort Group 36, working on the Freetown, Sierra Leone convoy route. She continued these operations until November when she took part in Operation Torch, the Anglo-American invasion of French North Africa. The ship then carried out local escort work along the coast of Algeria until she ran aground off Algiers on 9 December, sustaining heavy damage and not being refloated until 14 December. After return to British waters, she was under repair at Liverpool until August 1943.

Deptford was then allocated to the 37th Escort Group, operating in the Mediterranean Sea, being based at Alexandria and operating in the Eastern Mediterranean until July 1944, when she transferred to Taranto for operations in the Central Mediterranean. In December 1944, Deptford returned to the United Kingdom, where she was employed for convoy escort in the English Channel until May 1945 brought the end of the war in Europe.

Deptford went into reserve at Milford Haven in July 1945 and was sold for scrap on 8 March 1948, being broken up at Milford Haven by Thos. W. Ward from May 1948.

== Pennant number ==
Note: The Pennant number was not painted on the ship's side until September 1939.

Pennant number	From	To
L53	1935	April 1940
U53	April 1940	1945
