= 36th Escort Group (Royal Navy) =

- Active: September 1941-August 1942
- Country: United Kingdom
- Allegiance: British Empire
- Branch: Royal Navy
- Type: Escort Group
- Role: Anti-Submarine Warfare
- Size: ~9 ships
- Part of: Western Approaches Command
- Garrison/HQ: Liverpool
- Engagements: HG 76; OG 82; HG 84

Commanders
- Notable commanders: Capt F J Walker "The Boss"

36th Escort Group was a British formation of the Royal Navy which saw action during the Second World War, principally in the Battle of the Atlantic. The group operated mainly on the Gibraltar and South Atlantic convoy routes and was involved in several convoy battles, including Convoy HG 76, one of the first Allied victories in the Atlantic campaign.

== Formation ==
36th Escort Group (36 EG) was formed in October 1941 led by HMS Stork under the command of Cdr FJ "Johnnie" Walker, destined to become Britains most successful anti-submarine warfare commander.

The group comprised 2 sloops, Stork and Deptford (Lt Cdr HR White), and 7 corvettes. Convolvulus (Lt RS Connel), Gardenia (Lt Cdr Firth), Marigold (Lt J Renwick), Pentstemon (Lt Cdr J Byron), Rhodedendron (Lt Cdr LA Sayers), Samphire (Lt Cdr FT Renny) and Vetch (Lt Cdr HJ Beverley).

== Service history ==
36 Escort Group's first convoy was HG 70, a group of 24 ships homebound from Gibraltar, in August 1941. This was uneventful, as no attack developed. The group's next few convoys, to Gibraltar and the South Atlantic, were equally uneventful, giving the group time to drill and practice group exercises.

In December 1941 36 EG escorted HG 76 in company with the escort carrier Audacity and her destroyer consorts. Over a period of 8 days, the escort force destroyed 4 U-boats, 3 of them by 36 EG, for the loss of 2 ships and 2 warships, one of which was carrier Audacity. Hailed as a major victory, HG 76 was the first time heavy losses had been inflicted on an attacking U-boat force.

In April 1942 the group accompanied OG 82. With a group reduced to Stork and 4 corvettes, (Convolvulus, Gardenia, Pentstemon and Vetch), 36 EG destroyed one U-boat, U-252, with no ships lost.

In June 1942 HG 84, escorted by Stork with 3 corvettes (Convolvulus, Gardenia and Marigold) was attacked by the U-boat group Endrass. The groups aggressive defence caused damage to 5 U-boats, but no kills, while 5 ships were sunk. The destroyer Wild Swan, sent as reinforcement, was also sunk in an air attack.

In June Walker left the group to take command of Liverpool base and 36 EG was disbanded, its vessels being transferred to other groups. During its 13-month history 36 EG had escorted 16 convoys. It saw the loss of 9 ships and 2 warships, for the destruction of 4 U-boats and another 5 damaged. Over 400 ships conveyed by 36 EG arrived safely.

== Lists ==
=== Ships lost ===
No members of 36 EG were lost

=== U-boats destroyed ===
- U-131 sunk by Pentstemon, Stork, aircraft and 3 other warships on 17 December 1941
- U-574 rammed by Stork on 19 December 1941
- U-567 depth-charged by Deptford on 21 December 1941
- U-252 depth-charged by Vetch and Stork on 14 April 1942

== Table: convoys escorted ==
Outbound	Homebound
.	HG 70
OS 6	SL 89
OS 11	.
OG 76	HG 76
OG 80	HG 80
OG 82	HG 82
OG 84	HG 84
OG 86	HG 86
OG 88	HG 88
