= HMS Pentstemon (K61) =

- HMS Penstemon at Algiers

History

United Kingdom
- Name: HMS Pentstemon
- Ordered: 31 August 1939
- Builder: Philip & Son, Dartmouth
- Laid down: 28 November 1939
- Launched: 18 January 1941
- Commissioned: 31 July 1941
- Identification: Pennant number: K61
- Fate: Sold, 1946

Greece
- Name: Galaxidi
- Operator: Greek Government
- Acquired: 1947
- Fate: Sold 1951

Greece
- Name: Rosa Vlassi
- Operator: George and Alex. Vlassis, Piraeus
- Acquired: 1951
- Fate: Sold 1960

Greece
- Name: Athini
- Operator: Hellenic Atlantic Fishing Co.
- Acquired: 1960
- Fate: Wrecked 1967

General characteristics
- Class & type: Flower-class corvette
- Displacement: 940 long tons (960 t)
- Length: 205 ft (62 m)
- Beam: 33 ft (10 m)
- Draught: 11 ft 6 in (3.51 m)
- Propulsion: 2 × fire-tube boilers; 1 × triple-expansion steam engine
- Speed: 16 kn (30 km/h)
- Complement: 85
- Armament: 1 × BL 4-inch Mk IX gun; 2 × depth-charge throwers; 2 × stern depth-charge rails
- Notes: Armament was modified during wartime service

HMS Pentstemon was a Flower-class corvette of the British Royal Navy that served during the Second World War. Pentstemon built by Philip & Son of Dartmouth, Devon, from November 1939 to July 1941. Pentstemon operated in the Atlantic Ocean and the Mediterranean Sea during the war. She took part in the sinking of the German submarine U-131 on 17 December 1941, and in Operation Torch, the Allied invasion of French North Africa in November 1942 and the Allied invasion of Sicily in July 1943.

Following the end of the war, the ship was sold, and converted to a trawler, operating under the Greek flag as Galaxidi in 1947. She was renamed Rosa Vlassi in 1951 and Athina in 1960. Athina was wrecked off South Africa on 31 July 1967.

== Design and construction ==
The Flower-class arose as a result of the Royal Navy's realisation in the late 1930s that it had a shortage of escort vessels, particularly coastal escorts for use on the East coast of Britain, as the likelihood of war with Germany increased. To meet this urgent requirement, a design developed based on the whale-catcher Southern Pride – this design was much more capable than naval trawlers, but cheaper and quicker to build than the Hunt-class destroyers or Kingfisher-class sloops that were alternatives for the coastal escort role.

The early Flowers, such as Pentstemon were 205 feet 0 inches (62.48 m) long overall, 196 feet 0 inches (59.74 m) at the waterline and 190 feet 0 inches (57.91 m) between perpendiculars. Beam was 33 feet 0 inches (10.06 m) and draught was 14 feet 10 inches (4.52 m) aft. Displacement was about 940 long tons (960 t) standard and 1,170 long tons (1,190 t) full load. Two cylindrical boilers fed steam to a Vertical Triple Expansion Engine rated at 2,750 indicated horsepower (2,050 kW) which drove a single propeller shaft. This gave a speed of 16 knots (18 mph; 30 km/h). 200 tons of oil were carried, giving a range of 4,000 nautical miles (4,600 mi; 7,400 km) at 12 knots (14 mph; 22 km/h).

Design armament was a single BL 4-inch Mk IX naval gun forward and a single 2-pounder "pom-pom" anti-aircraft gun aft. Fifty depth charges were carried, while later in the war the depth charges were supplemented by a Hedgehog anti-submarine mortar. Originally designed for a crew of 25, this had increased to 53 on entering service and to 80 by the end of the war.

Pentstemon formed part of the second 24-ship order for Flower-class corvettes placed on 31 August 1939. She was laid down at Philip and Son's, Dartmouth, Devon shipyard on 28 November 1939, (Note: The same day as sister ship Nigella.) as yard number 928, was launched on 18 January 1941 and completed on 31 July 1941. Pentstemon was the second ship of that name to serve with the Royal Navy, and was assigned the pennant number K61.

== Service ==
In September 1941, Pentstemon was a member of the 36th Escort Group, which together with the escort carrier Audacity escorted Convoy OG 74 from Britain to Gibraltar. When the sloop Deptford and the corvette Marigold were detached to support four stragglers from the convoy, Pentstemon remained with the convoy. In total, six ships from the convoy were sunk. Pentstemon remained part of the 36th Escort Group on 1 October 1941. On 13 November 1941, the aircraft carrier Ark Royal was torpedoed by the German submarine U-81 near Gibraltar while returning from an operation to fly fighters to Malta. Pentstemon, carrying a large portable pump, was ordered out from Gibraltar to go to Ark Royal's assistance, but all salvage attempts failed, and the carrier sank on 14 November.

In 14 December 1941, Pentstemon left Gibraltar as part of the escort of Convoy HG 76, along with the rest of the 36th Escort Group (Note: The sloops Deptford and Stork and the corvettes Convolvulus, Jonquil, Marigold, Pentstemon, Rhododendron, Samphire and Vetch.) together with a support group of Audacity and three (Note: Blankney, Exmoor and Stanley.) destroyers. On the morning of 17 December, Grumman Martlet fighter from Audacity spotted the German submarine U-131 which dived away. The sloop Stork, the three destroyers and Pentstemon set out to hunt the submarine, and after Blankney had carried out an unsuccessful attack, Pantstemon detected the submarine on her sonar, and dropped 10 depth charges, badly damaging U-131. The submarine attempted to repair the damage while submerged, but after these attempts failed attempted to escape on the surface. The submarine was spotted by Stanley and all five British ships gave chase, while a Martlet attempted to strafe the submarine and was shot down. After a 20-minute exchange of gunfire, the submarine had been hit several times and her commanding officer decided to scuttle U-131. Credit for sinking U-131 was given to all five British ships. That evening, Pentstemon forced U-107 to submerge. In total, three U-boats were sunk at the cost of two merchant ships, the carrier Audacity and the destroyer Stanley.

On 21 February 1942, Pentstemon intercepted the Portuguese cargo liner Lourenço Marques, which was carrying a packet of industrial diamonds from Funchal to Lisbon, as it was claimed that German forces were planning to intercept the ship to seize the diamonds. The corvette removed the diamonds to prevent this. In August 1942, Pentstemon was part of the escort for Convoy SL 118, travelling northwards from Sierra Leone to Britain, which came under attack by German submarines off the Azores from 16 August. On 18 August, Pentstemon reported sighting two U-boats, one of which was forced to dive by gunfire from the corvette, while later that day, when the British steamer Hatarana was torpedoed by the German submarine U-214, rescued 20 of the steamer's crew before scuttling her with gunfire.

In November 1942, the Allies invaded French North Africa, with Pentstemon escorting the assault convoy KMS 1. On 5 November, Pentstemon collided with the minesweeper Alarm, slightly damaging Alarm's bow. The corvette arrived off Algiers for the landings on 8 November. On 10 November Pentstemon left Algiers as part of the escort of a convoy to Bougie (now Béjaïa), arriving there on 11 November. Later that day the landing ship Awatea was bombed by German bombers and set on fire. Pentstemon went alongside Awatea and helped to rescue the landing ship's crew before the ship sank.

From 8 January 1943, Convoy TM 1, consisting of eight tankers (Note: It had already lost one tanker on 3 January to submarine attack.) with an escort of one destroyer and three corvettes, en route from Trinidad to the Mediterranean, came under heavy U-boat attack, with five tankers torpedoed on 8 and 9 January. On 9 January, Pentstemon set out from Gibraltar in company with the corvette Samphire and the tug Nimble, to go to the convoys assistance, and in particular to search for ships that had been torpedoed but were believed to remain afloat. However, all the hulks were finished off by U-boats before they could be salvaged, and in total, seven of the nine tankers in the convoy were sunk. On 6 February 1943, Pentstemon was part of the escort of Convoy MKS 7, which was east of Oran when the German submarine U-407 attacked, missing Pentstemon and Nasturtium. On 18 May, Penstemon was escorting Convoy KMS 14/UGS 8 when U-414 torpedoed the freighters Empire Eve and Fort Anne. Empire Eve sank but Fort Anne stayed afloat and reached safety in Algiers.

July 1943 brought the Allied invasion of Sicily, with Pentstemon escorting the back up Convoy MWS 37 which left Alexandria on 6 July and arrived off the landing beaches on 13 July 1943.

== Civil use ==
Pentstemon was sold in 1946, and in 1947 was converted to a trawler, with the name Galaxidi. In 1948, Galaxidi was listed as owned by the Greek Government, with a Gross register tonnage (GRT) of 810 and a Net register tonnage (NRT) of 303. In 1951, the ship was sold to George and Alex. Vlassis of Piraeus and was renamed Rosa Vlassi. In 1960, the ship was owned by the Hellenic Atlantic Fishing Co. and renamed Athina. In 1962 Athina was re-engined with an 8-cylinder oil engine, with ownership transferring to the Greek Atlantic Fishing Co. Athina was wrecked in Plettenberg Bay, South Africa on 31 July 1967.

== See also ==
- Battle of the Atlantic

== Bibliography ==
- Admiralty War Diary February 1942: Days 16–28 (PDF). Admiralty. February 1942.
- Admiralty War Diary August 1942: Days 1–15 (PDF). Admiralty. August 1942.
- Admiralty War Diary August 1942: Days 16–31 (PDF). Admiralty. August 1942.
- Admiralty War Diary January 1943: Days 1–15 (PDF). Admiralty. January 1943.
- Admiralty War Diary May 1943: Days 16–31 (PDF). Admiralty. May 1943.
- Blair, Clay (2000a). Hitler's U-Boat War: The Hunters 1939–1942. London: Cassell & Co. ISBN 0-304-35260-8.
- Blair, Clay (2000b). Hitler's U-Boat War: The Hunted 1942–1945. New York: Modern Library. ISBN 0-679-64033-9.
- Casualty Return: Merchant Ships Totally Lost, Broken Up, Etc., During the Quarter Ended 30th September 1967 (as reported up to 29th February, 1968) (PDF). London: Lloyd's Register of Shipping. March 1968.
- Colledge, J. J.; Warlow, Ben (2006) [1969]. Ships of the Royal Navy: The Complete Record of All Fighting Ships of the Royal Navy from the 15th Century to the Present (3rd Rev ed.). London: Chatham Publishing. ISBN 978-1-86176-281-8. OCLC 67375475.
- Elliott, Peter (1977). Allied Escort Ships of World War II: A complete survey. London: Macdonald and Jane's Publishers. ISBN 0-356-08401-9.
- Friedman, Norman (2008). British Destroyers and Frigates: The Second World War and After. Barnsley, UK: Seaforth Publishing. ISBN 978-1-84832-015-4.
- Lambert, John; Brown, Les (2008). Flower-Class Corvettes. St. Catharines, Ontario, Canada: Vanwall Publishing. ISBN 978-1-55068-986-0.
- Lloyd's Register of Shipping 1948–1949: Vol. I A–L: Steamers, Motorships, Sailing Vessels etc. London: Lloyd's Register of Shipping. 1948.
- Lloyd's Register of Shipping Register Book 1951–1952: Vol. II M–Z. London: Lloyd's Register of Shipping. 1951.
- Lenton, H. T. (1999). British & Empire Warships of the Second World War. London: Greenhill Books.
- Rohwer, Jürgen (1983). Axis Submarine Successes 1939–1945. Annapolis, Maryland, US: Naval Institute Press. ISBN 0-87021-082-3.
- Rohwer, Jürgen (2005). Chronology of the War at Sea 1939–1945: The Naval History of World War Two. Annapolis, Maryland, US: Naval Institute Press. ISBN 1-59114-119-2.
- Roskill, S. W. (1954–1961). The War at Sea 1939–1945. London: HMSO.
- Winser, John de S. (2002). British Invasion Fleets: The Mediterranean and beyond 1942–1945. Gravesend, UK: World Ship Society. ISBN 0-9543310-0-1.
- Wynn, Kenneth (2003) [1997]. U-Boat Operations of the Second World War: Volume 1: Career Histories, U1—U510. London: Caxton Editions. ISBN 1-84067-525-X.
