= Convoy OG 82 =

Convoy during naval battles of the Second World War

- Part of World War II
Date	14 April 1942
Location	Eastern Atlantic
Result	Allied victory

Belligerents
Germany	United Kingdom

Commanders and leaders
BdU: Admiral Karl Dönitz	Commodore:Capt. AJ Baxter; SO Escort: Cdr. Frederic John Walker

Strength
1 U-boat	17 ships 5 escorts

Casualties and losses
1 U-boat destroyed	No ships sunk

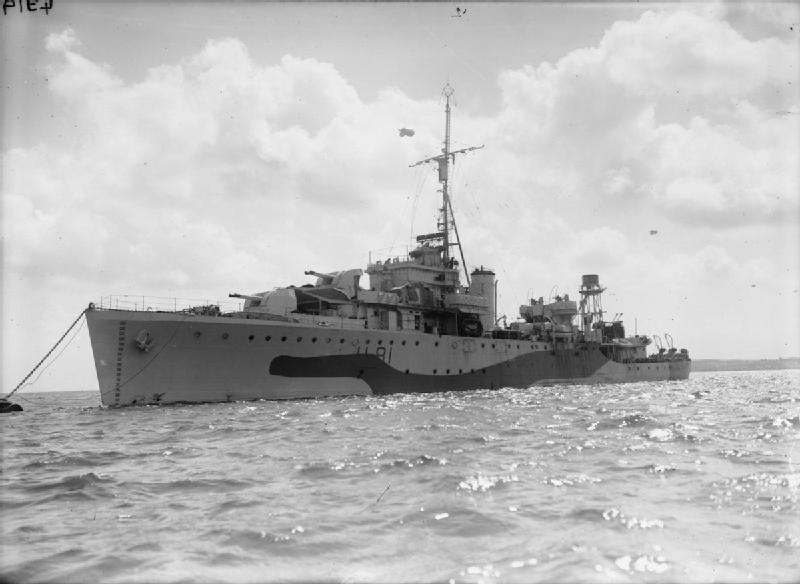
Photograph of British sloop HMS Stork.

OG 82 was an Allied convoy of the OG (Outward to Gibraltar) series during World War II. The action involving this convoy resulted in the destruction of a U-boat, and also had consequences for German U-boat strategy.

== Forces involved ==
OG 82 comprised 17 ships outward bound to Gibraltar, carrying war materials and trade goods. The convoy commodore was Captain AJ Baxter in Baron Yarborough, and the convoy was protected by an understrength escort group. This was 36th Escort Group, led by Cdr FJ "Johnnie" Walker, consisting of the sloop Stork and the Flower-class corvettes Convolvulus, Pentstemon, Vetch and Gardenia (joined 13 April). The convoy's protection was enhanced by armed merchants— the CAM ships Empire Eve and Empire Heath, and the rescue ship Toward.

== Action ==
OG 82 left Liverpool on 8 April 1942. On 14 April 1942 OG 82 was at the western edge of the Bay of Biscay when it was encountered by U-252, inbound to France after completing her first war patrol. Her skipper, KL Kai Lerchner, sent a sighting report stating that the convoy was lightly escorted and that he was starting to shadow.

His radio signal was picked up and DFed by Royal Navy land stations and reported to Walker. He quickly dispatched his four corvettes to search for the U-boat, which was picked up on radar by Vetch. As Vetch closed to attack, U-252 crash-dived and launched two torpedoes which narrowly missed the corvette. Arriving in Stork, Walker then sent the others corvettes back to the convoy and commenced a hunt with Vetch Together they made several attacks, dropping 45 depth charges in total, and U-252 was destroyed.

No further attacks took place and OG 82 arrived at Gibraltar on 20 April without loss.

== Ships in the convoy ==
=== Allied merchant ships ===
A total of 17 merchant vessels joined the convoy, either in Liverpool or later in the voyage.

Name	Flag	Tonnage (GRT)	Notes
Baron Ramsey (1929)	United Kingdom	3,650	
Baron Yarborough (1928)	United Kingdom	3,388	
Cara (1929)	United Kingdom	1,760	
City of Lancaster (1924)	United Kingdom	3,041	
Crane (1937)	United Kingdom	785	
Empire Eve (1941)	United Kingdom	5,979	CAM ship
Empire Heath (1941)	United Kingdom	6,643	CAM ship
Empire Snipe (1919)	United Kingdom	2,497	Bound for Lisbon
Guido (1920)	United Kingdom	3,921	
Leadgate (1925)	United Kingdom	2,125	Joined late and straggled (18 April)
Macbrae (1924)	United Kingdom	2,117	
Newton Pine (1925)	United Kingdom	4,212	
Ogmore Castle (1919)	United Kingdom	2,481	
Ousel (1922)	United Kingdom	1,533	
Pencarrow (1921)	United Kingdom	4,841	Bound for Lisbon
Shuna (1937)	United Kingdom	1,575	
Toward (1923)	United Kingdom	1,571	Rescue ship

=== Convoy escorts ===
The 36th Escort Group of armed military ships escorted the convoy at various strengths during its journey.

Name	Flag	Type	Joined	Left
HMS Convolvulus (K45)	Royal Navy	Flower-class corvette	9 Apr 1942	20 April 1942
HMS Gardenia (K99)	Royal Navy	Flower-class corvette	13 Apr 1942	20 April 1942
HMS Pentstemon (K61)	Royal Navy	Flower-class corvette	9 Apr 1942	20 April 1942
HMS Stork (L81)	Royal Navy	Bittern-class anti-submarine sloop	9 Apr 1942	20 April 1942
HMS Vetch (K132)	Royal Navy	Flower-class corvette	9 Apr 1942	20 April 1942

== U-boats ==
Date	Number	Type	Captain	Location	Notes
14 April 1942	U-252	Type VIIC	KL Kai Lerchen	NW of Cape Finisterre; 47°00′N 18°14′W	contact by Vetch, d/c by Vetch, Stork

== Aftermath ==
This small action resulted in the destruction of one U-boat, but had far-reaching consequences. U-252’s disappearance, after reporting an encounter with a lightly escorted convoy, was similar to the disappearance six weeks previously of U-82 in the same area. From this, Befehlshaber der U-Boote (BdU) Karl Dönitz reached the erroneous conclusion that the Allies were running a decoy operation, sending heavily armed anti-submarine vessels disguised as a weak convoy to act as a U-boat trap. He therefore instructed his U-boat force to avoid attacking convoys in the Biscay area, an unexpected benefit to the Allies from this brief action.
