= Bittern-class sloop =

1934 class of British sloops-of-war

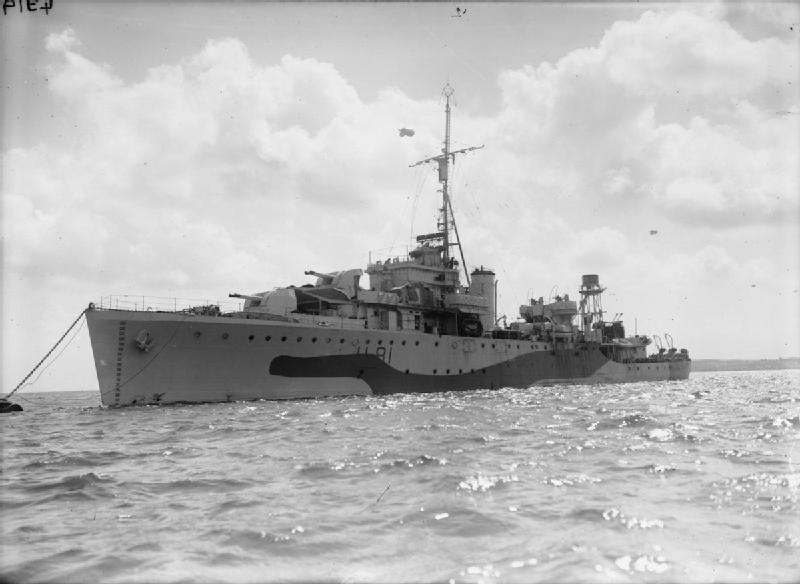
- Stork in July 1943

Class overview
- Name: Bittern class
- Builders: William Denny & Brothers, Dumbarton, United Kingdom; John Brown Shipbuilding & Engineering Company Limited, Clyde, UK; J S White & Company, Cowes, UK
- Operators: Royal Navy
- Preceded by: Kingfisher class
- Succeeded by: Egret class
- Built: 3
- Lost: 1
- Retired: 2

General characteristics
- Type: Sloop-of-war
- Displacement: 1190 Tons
- Length: 266 ft (81 m)
- Beam: 37 ft (11 m)
- Propulsion: Geared steam turbines on two shafts; 3,300 hp
- Speed: 18.75-knot (34.73 km/h)
- Complement: 125
- Armament: Stork, Bittern; Six 4-inch (102 mm) AA guns (3 × 2); Four 0.5-inch (13 mm) AA guns (1 × 4); Depth charges 90; Enchantress (as designed): Four 4.7 inch guns (4 × 1); Four 0.5-inch AA guns (1 × 4); Depth charges 60

The Bittern-class sloop was a three-ship class of long-range escort vessels used in the Second World War by the Royal Navy.

== Design ==
The Bittern class were built as light, long-range escort ships with limited anti-air capability. They were fitted with Denny-Brown fin stabilisers and a HACS fire control system.

Three ships were built: HMS Enchantress (originally called Bittern, but renamed before launching in 1934), HMS Stork and HMS Bittern. Enchantress was the first in the class, and was built as an armed Admiral's yacht. The as-completed armament was two single 4.7-inch guns forward and four 3-pounder saluting guns. Anti-aircraft armament and a third, aft, 4.7-inch gun was installed at the outbreak of war.

Stork was unarmed on completion, but with provision for six 4-inch guns, plus AA and ASW weaponry; she served as a survey vessel in the Far East. Her main armament was added at the outbreak of war.

Bittern completed as designed, with the same armament as Stork

The design served as the basis for the Egret and Black Swan-class sloops.

== Ships in class ==
Ship	Builder	Laid Down	Launched	Fate
Enchantress	John Brown Shipbuilding & Engineering Company Limited, Clydebank	9 March 1934	21 December 1934	Sold 1946
Stork	William Denny & Brothers, Dumbarton	19 June 1935	21 April 1936	Broken up 1958
Bittern	J S White & Company, Cowes	27 August 1936	14 July 1937	Sunk by bombing off Namsos, Norway, 30 April 1940

== Service history ==
Enchantress served as convoy escort throughout the war, and was credited with the destruction of an Italian submarine. She survived the war and was sold into civilian service in 1946, being renamed Lady Enchantress. She was broken up in 1952. Stork was completed as an unarmed survey vessel, and was only armed after the outbreak of war. She also served as a convoy escort, and was senior ship in 36th Escort Group under Cdr. FJ Walker. She was credited with the destruction of four U-boats. Stork remained in service until being broken up in 1958. The third ship in the class was launched as Bittern, and completed as designed. She was involved in the Norwegian campaign, but was lost to air attacks at Namsos in 1940.
