= SS Meriwether Lewis =

World War II Liberty ship of the United States

History

United States
- Name: Meriwether Lewis
- Namesake: Meriwether Lewis
- Laid down: 19 May 1941
- Launched: 19 October 1941
- Fate: Torpedoed and sunk, 3 March 1943

General characteristics
- Type: Cargo ship
- Tonnage: 10,856 DWT
- Displacement: 14,245 tons
- Length: 135 m (442 ft 11 in)
- Beam: 17.3 m (56 ft 9 in)
- Draft: 8.5 m (27 ft 11 in)
- Propulsion: Two oil-fired boilers, Triple-expansion steam engine, Single screw, 2,500 hp (1,900 kW)
- Speed: 11 to 11.5 knots (20.4 to 21.3 km/h; 12.7 to 13.2 mph)
- Sensors & processing systems: 41
- Armament: Stern-mounted 4 in (102 mm) deck gun for use against surfaced submarines, variety of anti-aircraft guns

SS Meriwether Lewis (Hull Number 170) was a Liberty ship built in the United States during World War II. She was named after Meriwether Lewis, an American explorer who, along with William Clark, led the Corps of Discovery which explored the American West.

The ship was laid down on 19 May 1941, then launched on 19 October 1941. She was operated by the American Mail Line under charter with the Maritime Commission and War Shipping Administration. On 7 February 1943, the ship left New York as part of convoy HX 227, "bound for the United Kingdom and then to Murmansk, Russia." According to the German Navy, in the early morning of 2 March, she was identified as a straggler separated from her convoy; an initial attack by U-759 failed due to engine problems. U-759 then contacted U-634, leading it to Meriwether Lewis. One of four initial torpedoes stopped her; the second of two more torpedoes detonated the ship's ammunition cargo. She sank in the North Atlantic Ocean on 3 March 1943, southwest of Iceland at position 62°10′N 28°25′W.

By the time USCGC Ingham arrived at the site of the attack, all that was found was a 30-mile line of floating tires. There were no survivors from her crew.
