= German submarine U-131 =

U-131 may refer to one of the following German submarines:

- SM U-131, a Type U 127 submarine laid down during the First World War but unfinished at the end of the war; broken up incomplete 1919–20
  - During the First World War, Germany also had this submarine with a similar name:
    - SM UB-131, a Type UB III submarine launched in 1918 and that served in the First World War until surrendered on 24 November 1918; ran aground near Hastings on 9 January 1921; broken up
- German submarine U-131 (1941), a Type IXC submarine that served in the Second World War until sunk 17 December 1941
