= HMS Stonecrop (K142) =

Flower-class corvette

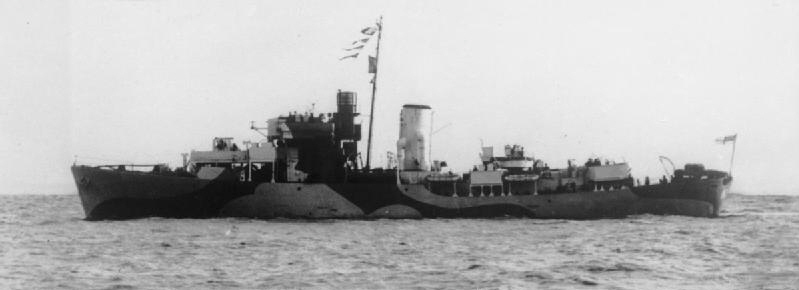
- HMS Stonecrop in October 1942

History

United Kingdom
- Name: HMS Stonecrop
- Ordered: 31 August 1939
- Builder: Smith's Dock Co., Ltd. (South Bank-on-Tees, U.K.)
- Laid down: 4 February 1941
- Launched: 12 May 1941
- Commissioned: 30 July 1941
- Identification: Pennant number: K142
- Fate: Sold on 17 May 1947; Became a merchant ship; Scrapped 1969

General characteristics
- Class & type: Flower-class corvette
- Displacement: 925 long tons (940 t)
- Length: 205 ft (62 m) o/a
- Beam: 33 ft (10 m)
- Draught: 11 ft 6 in (3.51 m)
- Installed power: 30 ft 4 in (9.25 m)
- Propulsion: 1 × 4-cycle triple-expansion reciprocating engine; 2 × Scotch fire-tube boilers; 1 × screw
- Speed: 16 kn (18 mph; 30 km/h)
- Range: 3,500 nmi (4,000 mi; 6,500 km) at 12 kn (14 mph; 22 km/h)
- Complement: 85
- Sensors & processing systems: 1 × SW1C or 2C radar; 1 × Type 123A or Type 127DV sonar
- Armament: 1 × BL 4 in (100 mm) Mk.IX gun; 4 × Vickers .50 cal machine gun (2×2); 4 × Lewis .303 cal machine gun (2×2); 2 × Mk.II depth charge throwers; 2 × Depth charge rails with 40 depth charges; originally fitted with minesweeping gear (later removed)

HMS Stonecrop (K142) was a Flower-class corvette of the Royal Navy. She served during the Second World War. She was named after the stonecrop flower (Sedum).

She was built at Smith's Dock, South Bank-on-Tees and launched on 12 May 1941.

== Service history ==
During the Second World War Stonecrop was a convoy escort and helped to sink two U-boats. On 2 April 1943 she and the sloop Black Swan sank U-124 with depth charges off the coast of Portugal. Both ships were escorting Convoy OS 45, from Liverpool to Freetown. Later that year on 30 August 1943 she and the sloop Stork sank U-634 with depth charges in the North Atlantic east of the Azores.

Following the war she was sold on 17 May 1947 and became the merchant ship Silver King.
