= HMS Blankney =

Destroyer of the Royal Navy

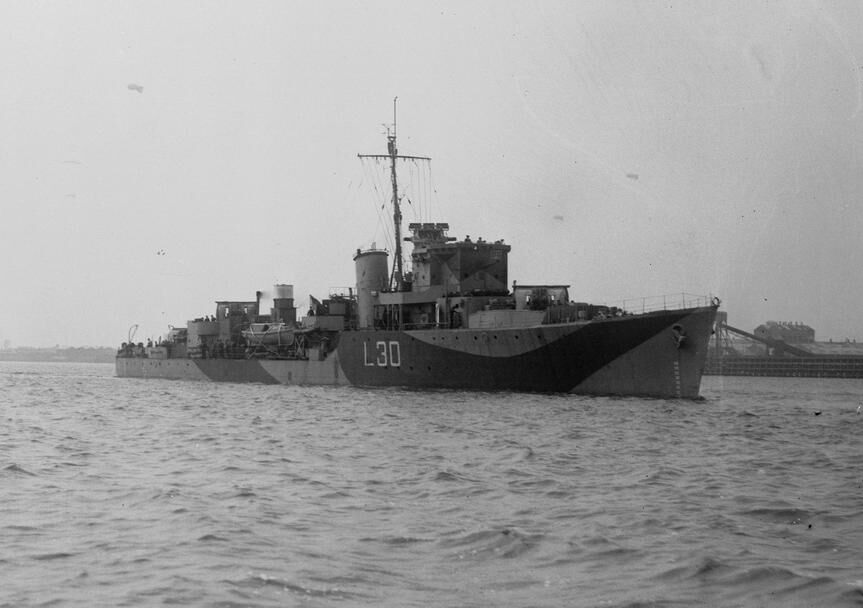
- HMS Blankney in 1943

History

United Kingdom
- Name: HMS Blankney
- Ordered: 4 September 1939
- Builder: John Brown & Company
- Yard number: 569
- Laid down: 17 May 1940
- Launched: 19 December 1940
- Commissioned: 11 April 1941
- Honours and awards: Atlantic 1941–43, Malta Convoys 1942, Arctic 1942–43, Sicily 1943, Salerno 1943, Normandy 1944, Mediterranean 1944.
- Fate: Scrapped in 1958
- Badge: On a Field Red, a griffin's head erased Gold in front of two hunting horns in saltire White.

General characteristics Type II
- Class & type: Hunt-class destroyer
- Displacement: 1,050 long tons (1,070 t) standard; 1,430 long tons (1,450 t) full load
- Length: 85.3 m (279 ft 10 in) o/a
- Beam: 9.6 m (31 ft 6 in)
- Draught: 2.51 m (8 ft 3 in)
- Propulsion: 2 Admiralty 3-drum boilers; 2 shaft Parsons geared turbines, 19,000 shp (14,000 kW)
- Speed: 27 knots (31 mph; 50 km/h); 25.5 kn (29.3 mph; 47.2 km/h) full
- Range: 3,600 nmi (6,700 km) at 14 kn (26 km/h)
- Complement: 164
- Armament: 6 × QF 4 in Mark XVI guns on twin mounts Mk. XIX; 4 × QF 2 pdr Mk. VIII on quad mount MK.VII; 2 × 20 mm Oerlikons on single mounts P Mk. III; 110 depth charges, 2 throwers, 3 racks

HMS Blankney was a Hunt-class destroyer of the Royal Navy and was the first and so far only warship to bear the name. She was laid down on 17 May 1940 at John Brown & Company, Clydebank, Scotland, launched on 19 December 1940 and commissioned on 11 April 1941.

Blankney was one of 33 Type II Hunt escort destroyers. The hulls of this second batch had an extra section, that with the increased beam, gave stability for a third twin 4" AA gun to be mounted as originally designed and more storage for depth charges (increased from 40 to 110). The class were named after fox hunts; in Blankney's case, this was the Blankney Hunt, a fox-hunting pack based in the North Kesteven district of Lincolnshire.

In 1942 the British government introduced Warship Week, a National Savings campaign where towns could "adopt" a Royal Navy ship. Blankney was adopted by Nantwich in Cheshire. The town has two roads named after the destroyer, Blankney Avenue and The Blankney. There is a plaque hanging in Civic Hall, commemorating the town's support for the crew.

== Service history ==
On 16 May 1941 Blankney escorted the troop ship Archangel (2,448 GRT) from Kirkwall, Orkney, bound for Aberdeen. That night three German Heinkel He 111s attacked the ships off the north coast of Aberdeenshire. Archangel was bombed and disabled. Blankney returned fire, shot down one of the He 111s, and drove off the others. She rescued more than 300 survivors, and landed them at Aberdeen on the morning of 17 May. Either Blankney or a tug tried to tow Archangel, but the troop ship beached at Blackdog just north of Aberdeen at 57°55'N, 02°03'W.

=== 12th escort group ===
From October 1941 Blankney was a member of the 12th escort group based at Derry, Northern Ireland. In December she was dispatched to reinforce Commander Johnny Walker's U-boat killer group that was escorting convoy HG 76 for passage to Gibraltar.

On 17 December 1942, the German submarine U-131 was spotted on the surface by a Martlet of 802 Naval Air Squadron (802 NAS) flying from the escort carrier Audacity and was forced to dive. After being damaged in a depth charge attack by the corvette Pentstemon, U-131 tried to escape on the surface. The Martlet strafed the boat, but was shot down in the process.

U-131 was shelled by the British escort destroyers Exmoor and Blankney, the destroyer Stanley, escorts Pentstemon and Stork. Realizing that the situation was hopeless, the crew scuttled the submarine. All 47 of the crew survived and were taken prisoner.

On 18 December, Stanley spotted U-434 on the surface and gave chase. As the submarine dived, Blankney achieved firm ASDIC (sonar) contact and made three depth charge attacks. U-434 was severely damaged, but managed to surface and allow her crew escape before sinking. Blankney rescued the crew before returning to Gibraltar to refuel.

=== Arctic convoys ===
At the start of 1942 Blankney was under repair at Gibraltar, she left Gibraltar on 23 June 1942 for the UK, before becoming part of the escort for Arctic convoy WS 16. Later she provided Distant Cover for Russian Convoy PQ 17 and the return Convoy QP 13 from Murmansk to Iceland. In July 1942 Blankney was damaged in a collision and spent three months in Northern Russia under repair, before sailing from Archangel as part of the escort of convoy QP 14.

Blankney spent the rest of the year under repair at Loch Ewe with a secondary role to provide a local escort for Convoy JW 51B

=== Operations in the Mediterranean ===
During Operation Husky. Blankney was able to provide air defence and shore bombardment at the Bark East Landing area with fellow destroyer, Puckeridge.

On 10 March 1944 Blankney, Blencathra, Brecon, Exmoor and the US destroyer USS Madison, sank U-450 in the western Mediterranean South of Ostia, at position 41°11′N 12°27′E, in a co-ordinated depth charge attack. All 42 crew members of the submarine were rescued and became prisoners of war.

On the night of 2 May 1944, U-371 was spotted when she surfaced almost in the middle of the convoy off Djidjelli on the Algerian coast and immediately crash-dived. When the U-boat re-surfaced she was detected by USS Menges, who closed to 3,000 m (3,300 yd). U-371 fired a torpedo, then dived. Menges was hit and the aft third of the vessel destroyed, but she remained afloat.

Blankney in company with the US destroyer escorts USS Pride and USS Joseph E. Campbell, along with the Free French destroyer escorts Sénégalais and L'Alcyon, were tasked to find U-371 and employed a new submarine hunting tactic called "Swamp". This called for the location of a known U-boat to be packed with escort ships and aircraft, to systematically search the area, forcing the U-boat to remain submerged until its batteries or air ran out and was forced to surface.

U-371 lay on the sea-bed at around 240 metres (790 ft) for the rest of the day to evade sonar detection, before the U-boat's commander, was forced to surface and attempt to escape in the darkness. Blankney and the other escorts spotted the submarine and immediately opened fire, scoring several hits. The U-boat returned fire, and managed to hit Sénégalais with a torpedo, causing some damage. The situation for U-371 was hopeless as she was unable to dive and faced massively superior firepower from the attacking destroyers. Most of her crew jumped overboard and were taken prisoner.

=== D-Day, 6 June 1944 ===
During Operation Neptune Blankney was a member of Force K Gunfire Support Bombarding, assigned to "Gold Beach" during operation the Allied landings in Normandy.

=== End of the War ===
Following Operation Neptune, Blankney was deployed in and around the English Channel and the North Sea to guard against any attempts for E-Boats or U-boats laying naval mines in the Thames estuary. Her war was completed when in August 1945, following VJ Day she returned to the UK where she was laid up in Sheerness as part of the Reserve Fleet.

== Fate ==
Blankney was refited after VJ Day and returned to UK. In May 1946 she was paid off and entered Reserve at Devonport. The ship had another refit in 1948 and was then laid up in Reserve Fleet at Sheerness. During 1952 she was moved to Hartlepool and approval was given for her to be placed on the Disposal List on 22 October 1958. She was sold to BISCO for scrapping by Hughes Bolckow at Blyth and was towed to the breaker's yard 9 March the same year. Her badge can still be seen painted on the side of the Selborne dry dock wall at Simonstown, South Africa.

Royal Mail Stamp

On 7 September 1989 a 22p stamp featuring the Ships Badge was issued (SG616)

== Publications ==
- British Vessels lost at Sea 1939–45 (2nd facs. repr. Patrick Stephens, Cambridge ed.). London: HMSO. 1976 [1947]. ISBN 978-0-85-059267-2. original titles, Ships of the Royal Navy: Statement of Losses during the Second World War and British Merchant Vessels lost of Damaged by enemy Action during Second World War
- Colledge, JJ; Warlow, Ben (2010). Ships of the Royal Navy - The Complete Record of all Fighting Ships of the Royal Navy from the 15th Century to the Present. Newbury: Casemate. ISBN 978-1-935149-07-1.
- English, John (1987). The Hunts – A history of the design, development and careers of the 86 destroyers of this class built for the Royal and Allied Navies during World War II. Kendal: World Ship Society. ISBN 0-905617-44-4.
- Gardiner, Robert; Chesneau, Roger, eds. (1980). Conway's All The World's Fighting Ships 1922–1946. London: Conway Maritime Press. ISBN 0-85177-146-7.
- Kemp, Paul (1999). U-Boats Destroyed - German Submarine Losses in the World Wars. London: Arms & Armour. ISBN 1-85409-515-3.
- Whitley, MJ (1988). Destroyers of World War Two – an international encyclopedia. London: Arms and Armour. ISBN 0-85368-910-5.
