= HMS Stork (L81) =

Sloop of the Royal Navy

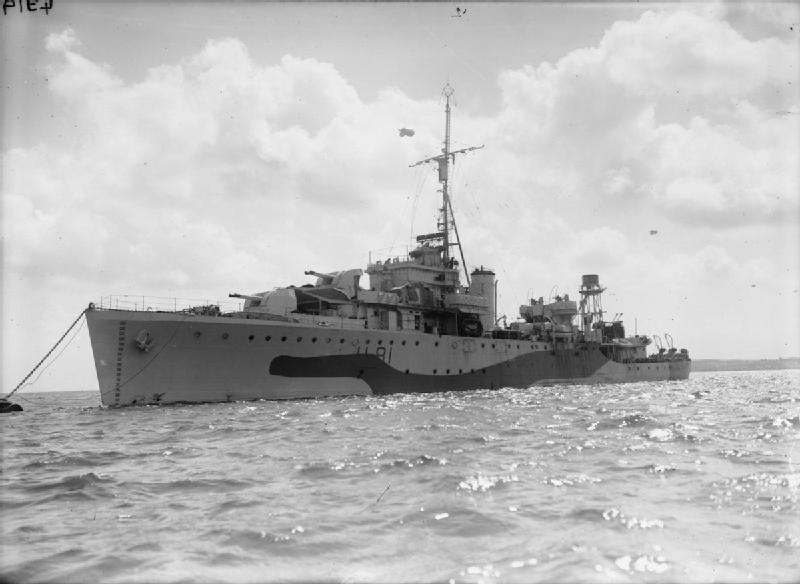
- HMS Stork in July 1943

History

United Kingdom
- Name: HMS Stork
- Ordered: 1 May 1935
- Builder: William Denny & Brothers, Dumbarton
- Laid down: 19 June 1935
- Launched: 21 April 1936
- Commissioned: 10 September 1936
- Identification: Pennant number: L81 / U81
- Fate: Broken up at Troon 1958

General characteristics
- Class & type: Bittern-class sloop
- Displacement: 1,190 tons
- Length: 266 ft (81 m)
- Beam: 37 ft (11 m)
- Propulsion: Geared steam turbines on two shafts; 3,300 hp
- Speed: 18.75-knot (34.73 km/h)
- Complement: 125
- Armament: 6 × 4-inch (102 mm) DP guns; 4 × 0.5-inch (13 mm) AA machine guns

HMS Stork (L81) was a Bittern-class sloop of the Royal Navy. She was active during the Second World War, serving in convoy escort groups, and was a successful anti-submarine warfare vessel, being credited with the destruction of four U-boats.

== Construction ==
Stork was laid down on 19 June 1935 by William Denny & Brothers of Dumbarton, Scotland, one of a series of general purpose vessels that could be employed as escort vessels in time of war. She was launched on 21 April 1936 and commissioned on 10 September the same year. She was completed as an unarmed survey ship, but with provision for an armament of anti-aircraft and anti-submarine warfare weapons. After commissioning Stork was sent to join the Commander-in-Chief, China, and operated in Malayan waters until 1939. With war in Europe looming she returned to Devonport in early 1939 for refit and for installation of her main armament and anti-aircraft guns.

== Service history ==
At the outbreak of hostilities in September 1939 Stork was still refitting; by November she had completed trials and was assigned to convoy escort duty in the North Sea, on the east coast routes.

In April 1940 Stork took part in the Norwegian Campaign and at Narvik came under air attack, assisting later in the rescue of survivors from the transport MS Chrobry.

In September 1940 Stork was damaged by air attack on an east coast convoy and spent the next six months in dock.

Stork completed repairs and trials in June 1941 and in August, under the command of Cdr FJ "Johnnie" Walker, was assigned to lead the 36th Escort Group (36 EG), employed escorting convoys to and from Gibraltar and the South Atlantic. In December 1941, while off Gibraltar, Stork and Samphire attacked U-568, which was damaged and forced to return to base. Later that month Stork and 36EG escorted HG 76 from Gibraltar homeward, augmented by the new escort carrier Audacity and other ships. During the journey five U-boats were sunk, four by ships of 36 EG, with Stork taking part in the destruction of U-131, and U-574, which was depth-charged and rammed by Stork.

Stork continued with 36 EG until mid-1942. On 14 April, while with OG 82 Stork and the corvette Vetch sank U-252. In June, HG 84 came under attack by Endrass group; Five ships were sunk, but Walker and 36EG were commended for their vigorous defence. During this action Stork and Gardenia attacked and damaged U-132, forcing it to retire. In August Walker took command of 20th Escort Group, with Stork as senior ship. 20EG designated as a support group, but after two trips (with ON 132 and SC 102) the group was disbanded to provide escorts for Operation Torch. While escorting Torch convoy KMS 1 in the Mediterranean Stork was torpedoed by U-77 off Algeria on 12 November. She was towed to Gibraltar for temporary repairs and then taken to Falmouth for further repairs. In June 1943, under new command, Stork joined the 37th Escort Group and on 30 August 1943, while escorting SL 135, she and the corvette Stonecrop sank U-634 in the North Atlantic east of the Azores. In 1944 she was part of the 116th Escort Group supporting Operation Neptune. In January 1945, with the war in Europe drawing to a conclusion, Stork was docked for refitting at Portsmouth prior to joining the British Pacific Fleet, but the work was delayed and not completed before the Japanese surrender, and the war's end. Stork was put in reserve but in January 1946 was re-commissioned as the Senior Officer's ship in the Fishery Protection Squadron where she served for two years before being put in reserve again. She was decommissioned and broken up in 1958.

== Battle honours ==
- Norway 1940
- North Sea 1940
- Atlantic 1940-44
- North Africa 1942
- Normandy 1944

== Successes ==
During her service Stork was credited with the destruction of four U-boats:

Date	U-boat	Type	Location	Notes
17 December 1941	U-131	IXC	off Cape St. Vincent; 34°12′N 13°35′W	contact by Martlet 802 Sqdn (HMS Audacity), pursued and sunk by gunfire, Stanley, Blankney, Exmoor, Pentstemon, Stork
19 December 1941	U-574	VIIC	off Lisbon; 38°12′N 17°23′W	d/c and rammed by Stork
14 April 1942	U-252	VIIC	NW of Cape Finisterre; 47°00′N 18°14′W	contact by Vetch, d/c by Vetch, Stork
30 August 1943	U-634	VIIC	W of Cape Finisterre; 40°13′N 19°24′W	d/c by Stonecrop, Stork
