= USS McCalla (DD-253) =

Clemson-class destroyer

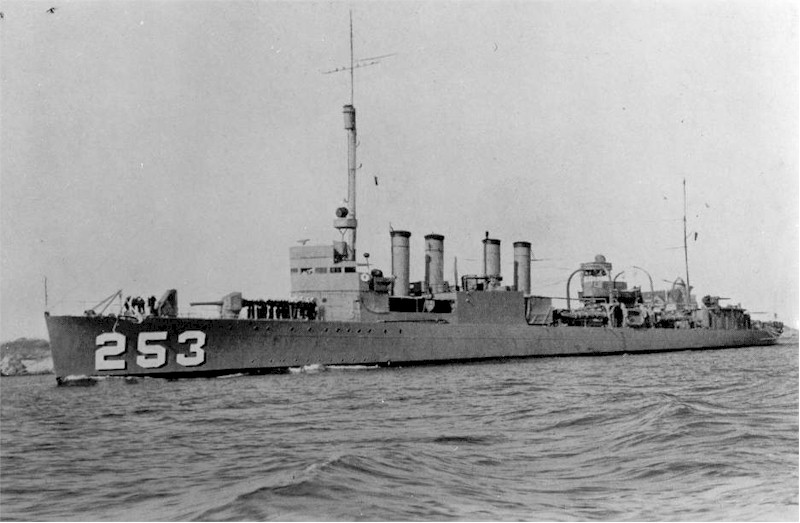
- USS McCalla

History

United States
- Name: USS McCalla
- Namesake: Bowman H. McCalla
- Builder: Bethlehem Shipbuilding Corporation, Fore River Shipyard, Quincy
- Laid down: 25 September 1918
- Launched: 18 February 1919
- Commissioned: 19 May 1919
- Decommissioned: 23 October 1940
- Stricken: 8 January 1941
- Identification: DD-253
- Fate: Transferred to the Royal Navy, 23 October 1940

United Kingdom
- Name: HMS Stanley
- Commissioned: 23 October 1940
- Identification: Pennant number: I73
- Fate: Sunk, 19 December 1941

General characteristics
- Class & type: Clemson-class destroyer
- Displacement: 1,190 tons
- Length: 314 ft 5 in (95.83 m)
- Beam: 31 ft 8 in (9.65 m)
- Draft: 9 ft 3 in (2.82 m)
- Propulsion: 26,500 shp (19,800 kW); geared turbines, 2 screws
- Speed: 35 kn (65 km/h; 40 mph)
- Range: 4,900 nmi (9,100 km; 5,600 mi) at 15 kn (28 km/h; 17 mph)
- Complement: 120 officers and enlisted
- Armament: 4 x 4 in (100 mm) guns; 1 x 3 in (76 mm) gun; 12 x 21 inch (533 mm) torpedo tubes

The first USS McCalla (DD-253) was a Clemson-class destroyer in the United States Navy. She transferred to the Royal Navy as HMS Stanley (I73) during World War II.

== Service history ==
=== As USS McCalla ===
Named for Bowman H. McCalla, she was laid down 25 September 1918 and launched 18 February 1919 by the Bethlehem Shipbuilding Corporation; sponsored by Mrs. Elizabeth McCalla Miller, daughter of Rear Admiral McCalla, and commissioned 19 May 1919.

McCalla remained in active status for less than 7 months. On 26 November 1919 she went into reserve at the Norfolk Navy Yard and decommissioned 30 June 1922. After war broke out in Europe, the destroyer recommissioned 18 December 1939 and prepared for turnover to Great Britain.

=== As HMS Stanley ===
She decommissioned and became a ship of the Royal Navy 23 October 1940 at Halifax, Nova Scotia as one of the destroyers transferred to England in exchange for bases in the West Indies. Commissioned as HMS Stanley (I73) she was designated for service in the Fourth "Town" Flotilla and departed Halifax 1 November. At St. John's on the 5th, when the German pocket battleship Admiral Scheer attacked a convoy underway for the United Kingdom, sinking six ships, Stanley was dispatched to escort the convoy back to Nova Scotia. She rendezvoused with ships 60 miles (97 km) out and escorted 15 vessels to Trinity Harbour. Delayed further for repairs, she finally got underway 14 December, arriving at Plymouth, England, 2 January 1941. Stanley was modified for long range trade convoy escort service by removal of the two forward boilers and substitution of additional fuel tanks. This modification improved endurance but reduced top speed to 25 knots (46 km/h; 29 mph). Three of the original 4"/50 caliber guns and one of the triple torpedo tube mounts were removed to reduce topside weight for additional depth charge stowage and installation of Hedgehog anti-submarine mortar.

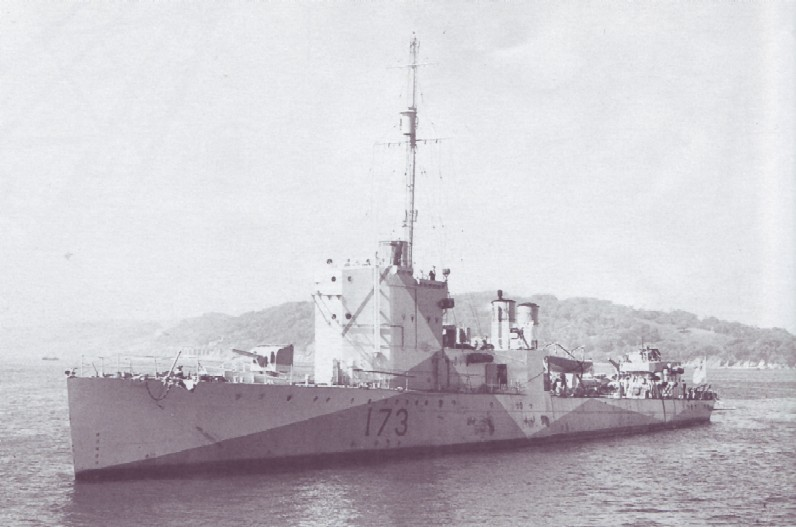
HMS Stanley after the completion of her conversion to a Long Range Escort at Devonport

Ready for service by August, Stanley was assigned first to the Western Approaches Command and then to the 40th Escort Group. One of her first convoys took her to Freetown, Sierra Leone, escorting ships carrying troops and equipment for Commonwealth units in the Middle East. On the return voyage she escorted a merchant convoy, departing 30 November. At Gibraltar in mid-December she joined Convoy HG 76, departing 14 December for Britain. On 17 December one of the escort carrier Audacity's aircraft sighted a submarine 22 miles (35 km) on the port beam of the convoy. Stanley and four other escorts quickly established contact, sank U-131, and picked up 55 survivors. The next day, Stanley, with Blankney, scored another success, sinking U-434 and picking up 42 of her crew.

On 19 December 1941, her success ran out. Stanley, on station astern of the convoy, reported the presence of another U-boat. Half an hour later U-574 fired three torpedoes, one of which scored a direct hit. Stanley exploded and sank (38°12′N 17°23′W) with the loss of all but 25 of her crew. Within 12 minutes, however, the sloop Stork responded and sank the submarine; 16 survivors were picked up.
