= HMS Convolvulus (K45) =

Flower-class corvette

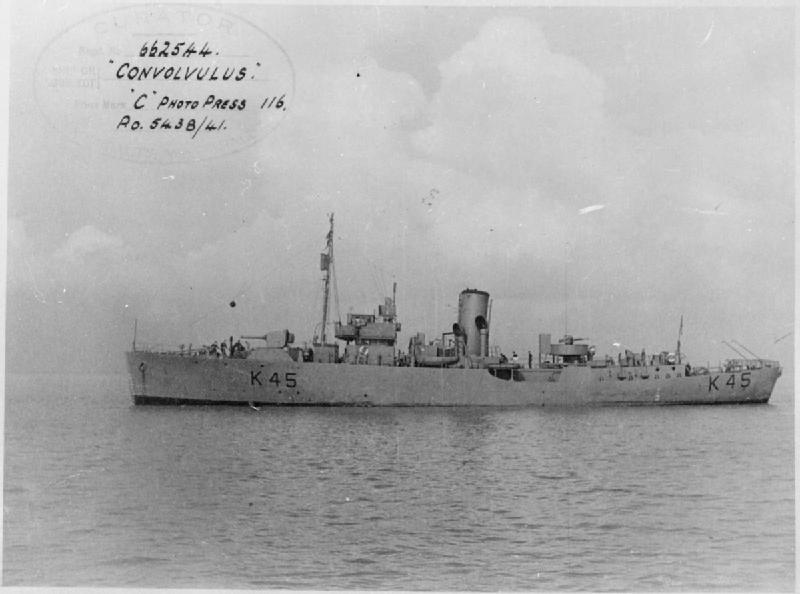
- HMS Convolvulus (K45)

History

United Kingdom
- Name: HMS Convolvulus
- Ordered: 25 July 1939
- Builder: Charles Hill & Sons, Bristol
- Yard number: 280
- Laid down: 17 January 1940
- Launched: 22 September 1940
- Commissioned: 26 February 1941
- Identification: Pennant number: K45
- Fate: Scrapped on 5 October 1947

General characteristics
- Class & type: Flower-class corvette

HMS Convolvulus was a Flower-class corvette of the Royal Navy in World War II. She was launched in 1940, served in the Battle of the Atlantic and was scrapped in 1947.

== Construction ==
Assigned the pennant number K45, Convolvulus was built by Charles Hill & Sons, Bristol. She was laid down on 17 January 1940 as yard number 280. She was launched on 22 September 1940 and was subsequently commissioned on 26 February 1941.

== Service ==
Convolvulus formed part of the 36th Escort Group which escorted the convoy HG 76 as well as convoys OG 82 and HG 84. During the escort of the latter, Convolvulus was left on a number of occasions as the convoy's lone escort whilst the other escorts investigated suspected U-boat contact or chased away U-boats caught on the surface. Despite the small escort screen offered by the ships of the 36th Escort Group and the lone sentry duty often performed by Convolvulus, HG 84 suffered only a 22% loss rate.

Captain F J Walker, RN, then leader of the 36th Escort Group said of this action:

"I am proud of the offensive spirit, initiative and sheer guts displayed by these Corvettes. Convolvulus, my deputy during my absences from the convoy, never put a foot wrong."

== Fate ==
She was sold to be broken up for scrap to John Cashmore Ltd on 21 August 1947 and she was eventually scrapped at Newport on 5 October 1947.

== Publications ==
Colledge, J. J.; Warlow, Ben (2006) [1969]. Ships of the Royal Navy: The Complete Record of All Fighting Ships of the Royal Navy from the 15th Century to the Present (3rd Rev ed.). London: Chatham Publishing. ISBN 978-1-86176-281-8. OCLC 67375475.
