= German submarine U-131 (1941) =

German World War II submarine

Coordinates: 34°12′N 13°35′W

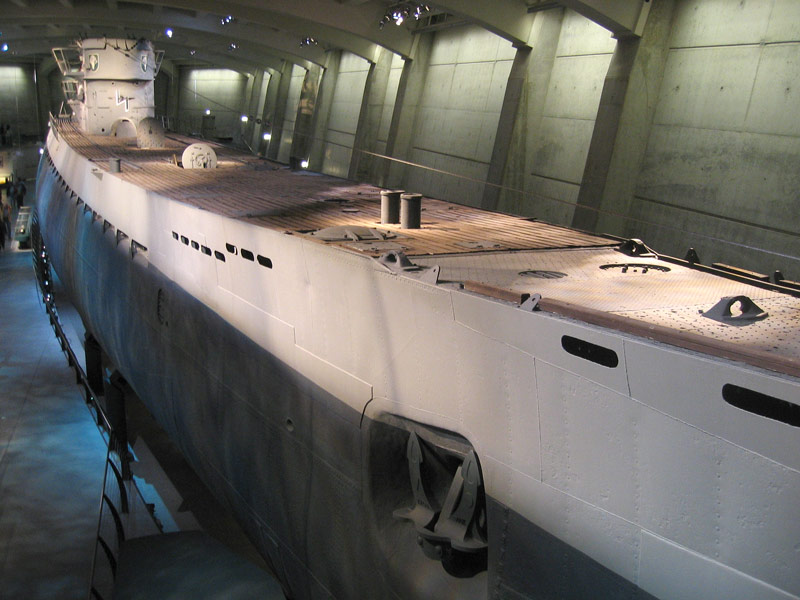
- U-505, a typical Type IXC boat

History

Nazi Germany
- Name: U-131
- Ordered: 7 August 1939
- Builder: DeSchiMAG AG Weser, Bremen
- Yard number: 994
- Laid down: 1 September 1940
- Launched: 1 April 1941
- Commissioned: 1 July 1941
- Fate: Scuttled, 17 December 1941
- Badge

General characteristics
- Class & type: Type IXC submarine
- Displacement: 1,120 t (1,100 long tons) surfaced; 1,232 t (1,213 long tons) submerged
- Length: 76.76 m (251 ft 10 in) o/a; 58.75 m (192 ft 9 in) pressure hull
- Beam: 6.76 m (22 ft 2 in) o/a; 4.40 m (14 ft 5 in) pressure hull
- Height: 9.60 m (31 ft 6 in)
- Draught: 4.70 m (15 ft 5 in)
- Installed power: 4,400 PS (3,200 kW; 4,300 bhp) (diesels); 1,000 PS (740 kW; 990 shp) (electric)
- Propulsion: 2 shafts; 2 × diesel engines; 2 × electric motors
- Speed: 18.3 knots (33.9 km/h; 21.1 mph) surfaced; 7.3 knots (13.5 km/h; 8.4 mph) submerged
- Range: 13,450 nmi (24,910 km; 15,480 mi) at 10 knots (19 km/h; 12 mph) surfaced; 64 nmi (119 km; 74 mi) at 4 knots (7.4 km/h; 4.6 mph) submerged
- Test depth: 230 m (750 ft)
- Complement: 4 officers, 44 enlisted
- Armament: 6 × torpedo tubes (4 bow, 2 stern); 22 × 53.3 cm (21 in) torpedoes; 1 × 10.5 cm (4.1 in) SK C/32 deck gun (180 rounds); 1 × 3.7 cm (1.5 in) SK C/30 AA gun; 1 × twin 2 cm FlaK 30 AA guns

Service record
- Part of: 4th U-boat Flotilla; 1 July – 1 November 1941; 2nd U-boat Flotilla; 1 November – 17 December 1941
- Identification codes: M 46 834
- Commanders: K.Kapt. Arend Baumann; 1 July – 17 December 1941
- Operations: 1 patrol: 27 November – 17 December 1941
- Victories: 1 merchant ship sunk (4,016 GRT)

German submarine U-131 was a Type IXC U-boat of Nazi Germany's Kriegsmarine during World War II.

Built at the DeSchiMAG AG Weser shipyard in Bremen, she was laid down on 1 September 1940, launched on 1 April 1941, and commissioned on 1 July 1941, with Korvettenkapitän Arend Baumann in command.

== Design ==
German Type IXC submarines were slightly larger than the original Type IXBs. U-131 had a displacement of 1,120 tonnes (1,100 long tons) when at the surface and 1,232 tonnes (1,213 long tons) while submerged. The U-boat had a total length of 76.76 m (251 ft 10 in), a pressure hull length of 58.75 m (192 ft 9 in), a beam of 6.76 m (22 ft 2 in), a height of 9.60 m (31 ft 6 in), and a draught of 4.70 m (15 ft 5 in). The submarine was powered by two MAN M 9 V 40/46 supercharged four-stroke, nine-cylinder diesel engines producing a total of 4,400 metric horsepower (3,240 kW; 4,340 shp) for use while surfaced, two Siemens-Schuckert 2 GU 345/34 double-acting electric motors producing a total of 1,000 metric horsepower (740 kW; 990 shp) for use while submerged. She had two shafts and two 1.92 m (6 ft) propellers. The boat was capable of operating at depths of up to 230 metres (750 ft).

The submarine had a maximum surface speed of 18.3 knots (33.9 km/h; 21.1 mph) and a maximum submerged speed of 7.3 knots (13.5 km/h; 8.4 mph). When submerged, the boat could operate for 63 nautical miles (117 km; 72 mi) at 4 knots (7.4 km/h; 4.6 mph); when surfaced, she could travel 13,450 nautical miles (24,910 km; 15,480 mi) at 10 knots (19 km/h; 12 mph). U-131 was fitted with six 53.3 cm (21 in) torpedo tubes (four fitted at the bow and two at the stern), 22 torpedoes, one 10.5 cm (4.13 in) SK C/32 naval gun, 180 rounds, and a 3.7 cm (1.5 in) SK C/30 as well as a 2 cm (0.79 in) C/30 anti-aircraft gun. The boat had a complement of forty-eight.

== Service history ==
U-131 sailed from Kiel on her first and only patrol on 27 November 1941.

On 6 December she torpedoed and sank the 4,016 ton British cargo ship Scottish Trader, a straggler from convoy SC 56, en route from Philadelphia to Liverpool, south of Iceland. All 43 of the crew perished.

On 17 December U-131 was spotted by a Grumman Martlet aircraft from the escort carrier HMS Audacity while shadowing Convoy HG 76 as part of the Seeräuber (English: "Pirate", lit. "Sea Robber") wolfpack.

U-131 was forced to dive, while ships of the 36th Escort Group, commanded by Frederic John Walker in HMS Stork, with four other escorts, including the destroyers HMS Exmoor, Blankney and Stanley and the corvette Pentstemon, approached to continue the attack. Detected by Stanley's ASDIC (sonar), she was depth charged by Pentstemon, and forced to surface, due to chlorine gas coming from the batteries. Unable to dive, she attempted to escape by running at full speed on the surface. While under pursuit U-131 shot down an attacking Martlet aircraft, killing the pilot, but was then shelled by the escort group, which scored several hits. Realizing that the situation was hopeless, the crew abandoned the U-boat and scuttled her. All 47 of the crew survived and were taken prisoner.

=== Wolfpacks ===
U-131 took part in one wolfpack, namely:

- Seeräuber (14 – 17 December 1941)

== Summary of raiding history ==
Date	Name	Nationality	Tonnage (GRT)	Fate
6 December 1941	Scottish Trader	United Kingdom	4,016	Sunk

== Bibliography ==
- Busch, Rainer; Röll, Hans-Joachim (1999). German U-boat commanders of World War II : a biographical dictionary. Translated by Brooks, Geoffrey. London, Annapolis, Md: Greenhill Books, Naval Institute Press. ISBN 1-55750-186-6.
- Busch, Rainer; Röll, Hans-Joachim (1999). Deutsche U-Boot-Verluste von September 1939 bis Mai 1945 [German U-boat losses from September 1939 to May 1945]. Der U-Boot-Krieg (in German). Vol. IV. Hamburg, Berlin, Bonn: Mittler. ISBN 3-8132-0514-2.
- Gröner, Erich; Jung, Dieter; Maass, Martin (1991). U-boats and Mine Warfare Vessels. German Warships 1815–1945. Vol. 2. Translated by Thomas, Keith; Magowan, Rachel. London: Conway Maritime Press. ISBN 0-85177-593-4.
- Kemp, Paul (1999). U-Boats Destroyed - German Submarine Losses in the World Wars. London: Arms & Armour. ISBN 1-85409-515-3.
