= German submarine U-574 =

German World War II submarine

Coordinates: 38°12′N 17°32′W

History

Nazi Germany
- Name: U-574
- Ordered: 24 October 1939
- Builder: Blohm & Voss, Hamburg
- Yard number: 550
- Laid down: 15 June 1940
- Launched: 12 April 1941
- Commissioned: 12 June 1941
- Fate: Sunk on 19 December 1941

General characteristics
- Class & type: Type VIIC submarine
- Displacement: 769 tonnes (757 long tons) surfaced; 871 t (857 long tons) submerged
- Length: 67.10 m (220 ft 2 in) o/a; 50.50 m (165 ft 8 in) pressure hull
- Beam: 6.20 m (20 ft 4 in) o/a; 4.70 m (15 ft 5 in) pressure hull
- Height: 9.60 m (31 ft 6 in)
- Draught: 4.74 m (15 ft 7 in)
- Installed power: 2,800–3,200 PS (2,100–2,400 kW; 2,800–3,200 bhp) (diesels); 750 PS (550 kW; 740 shp) (electric)
- Propulsion: 2 shafts; 2 × diesel engines; 2 × electric motors
- Speed: 17.7 knots (32.8 km/h; 20.4 mph) surfaced; 7.6 knots (14.1 km/h; 8.7 mph) submerged
- Range: 8,500 nmi (15,700 km; 9,800 mi) at 10 knots (19 km/h; 12 mph) surfaced; 80 nmi (150 km; 92 mi) at 4 knots (7.4 km/h; 4.6 mph) submerged
- Test depth: 230 m (750 ft); Crush depth: 250–295 m (820–968 ft)
- Complement: 4 officers, 40–56 enlisted
- Armament: 5 × 53.3 cm (21 in) torpedo tubes (four bow, one stern); 14 × torpedoes or 26 TMA mines; 1 × 8.8 cm (3.46 in) deck gun (220 rounds); 1 x 2 cm (0.79 in) C/30 AA gun

Service record
- Part of: 1st U-boat Flotilla; 12 June – 19 December 1941
- Identification codes: M 43 973
- Commanders: Oblt.z.S. Dietrich Gengelbach; 12 June – 19 December 1941
- Operations: 1 patrol: 8 November – 19 December 1941
- Victories: 1 warship sunk (1,190 tons)

German submarine U-574 was a Type VIIC U-boat of Nazi Germany's Kriegsmarine during World War II. She carried out one war patrol (partaking in two wolfpacks) and sank one warship of 1,190 tons. The U-boat was sunk west of Portugal on 19 December 1941.

== Design ==
German Type VIIC submarines were preceded by the shorter Type VIIB submarines. U-574 had a displacement of 769 tonnes (757 long tons) when at the surface and 871 tonnes (857 long tons) while submerged. She had a total length of 67.10 m (220 ft 2 in), a pressure hull length of 50.50 m (165 ft 8 in), a beam of 6.20 m (20 ft 4 in), a height of 9.60 m (31 ft 6 in), and a draught of 4.74 m (15 ft 7 in). The submarine was powered by two Germaniawerft F46 four-stroke, six-cylinder supercharged diesel engines producing a total of 2,800 to 3,200 metric horsepower (2,060 to 2,350 kW; 2,760 to 3,160 shp) for use while surfaced, two Brown, Boveri & Cie GG UB 720/8 double-acting electric motors producing a total of 750 metric horsepower (550 kW; 740 shp) for use while submerged. She had two shafts and two 1.23 m (4 ft) propellers. The boat was capable of operating at depths of up to 230 metres (750 ft).

The submarine had a maximum surface speed of 17.7 knots (32.8 km/h; 20.4 mph) and a maximum submerged speed of 7.6 knots (14.1 km/h; 8.7 mph). When submerged, the boat could operate for 80 nautical miles (150 km; 92 mi) at 4 knots (7.4 km/h; 4.6 mph); when surfaced, she could travel 8,500 nautical miles (15,700 km; 9,800 mi) at 10 knots (19 km/h; 12 mph). U-574 was fitted with five 53.3 cm (21 in) torpedo tubes (four fitted at the bow and one at the stern), fourteen torpedoes, one 8.8 cm (3.46 in) SK C/35 naval gun, 220 rounds, and a 2 cm (0.79 in) C/30 anti-aircraft gun. The boat had a complement of between forty-four and sixty.

== Service history ==
The submarine was laid down on 15 June 1940 at Blohm & Voss, Hamburg as yard number 550, launched on 12 April 1941 and commissioned on 12 June under the command of Oberleutnant zur See Dietrich Gengelbach.

She served with the 1st U-boat Flotilla from 12 June 1941 for training and stayed with that organization for operations until her loss, from 1 November 1941 until 19 December.

== Operational career ==
=== Patrol and loss ===
The boat departed Kiel on 8 November 1941, moved through the North Sea, negotiated the gap between Iceland and the Faroe Islands and entered the Atlantic Ocean.

On 19 December 1941, U-574 sank its only ship, the Royal Navy destroyer HMS Stanley, off the Azore Islands, but was sunk herself shortly afterward off Punta Delgada by depth charges and ramming from the British sloop HMS Stork, the lead escort ship under the command of Captain Frederic John Walker. When U-574 was scuttled, its captain, Dietrich Gengelbach, refused to leave the submarine and went down with her. Twenty-eight men died; there were 16 survivors.

=== Wolfpacks ===
U-574 took part in two wolfpacks, namely:

- Steuben (14 November – 1 December 1941)
- Seeräuber (14 – 19 December 1941)

== Summary of raiding history ==
Date	Ship Name	Nationality	Tonnage (Note: Merchant ship tonnages are in gross register tons. Military vessels are listed by tons displacement.)	Fate
19 December 1941	HMS Stanley	Royal Navy	1,190	Sunk

== Bibliography ==
- Busch, Rainer; Röll, Hans-Joachim (1999). German U-boat commanders of World War II : a biographical dictionary. Translated by Brooks, Geoffrey. London, Annapolis, Md: Greenhill Books, Naval Institute Press. ISBN 1-55750-186-6.
- Busch, Rainer; Röll, Hans-Joachim (1999). Der U-Boot-Krieg, 1939-1945: Deutsche U-Boot-Verluste von September 1939 bis Mai 1945 [German U-boat losses from September 1939 to May 1945] (in German). Vol. IV. Hamburg, Berlin, Bonn: Mittler. ISBN 3-8132-0514-2.
- Gröner, Eric; Jung, Dieter; Maass, Martin (1991). German Warships 1815-1945: U-boats and Mine Warfare Vessels. Vol. 2. Translated by Thomas, Keith; Magowan, Rachel. London: Conway Maritime Press. ISBN 0-85177-593-4.
- Kemp, Paul (1997). U-Boats Destroyed - German Submarine Losses in the World Wars. Arms & Armour. ISBN 1-85409-515-3.
