= HMS Audacity =

British Royal Navy aircraft carrier during World War II

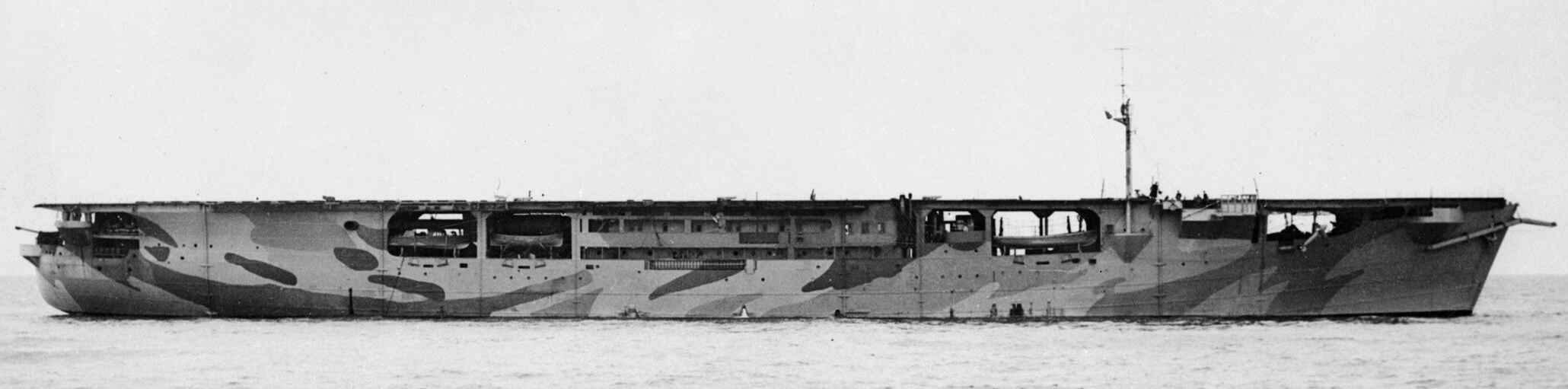
- HMS Audacity, after her conversion to an escort carrier

History

United Kingdom
- Name: Hannover (1939–40); Sinbad (1940); Empire Audacity (1940–41); HMS Empire Audacity (1941); HMS Audacity (1941)
- Owner: Norddeutscher Lloyd, Bremen (1939–40); Ministry of War Transport (1940–41); Royal Navy (1941)
- Operator: Norddeutscher Lloyd, Bremen (1939–40); Cunard White Star Line (1940–41); Royal Navy (1941)
- Port of registry: (Nazi Germany) Bremen (1939–40); (United Kingdom) Kingston, Jamaica (1940); (United Kingdom) London (1940–41); (United Kingdom) Royal Navy (1941)
- Builder: Bremer Vulkan, Vegesack
- Launched: 29 March 1939
- Commissioned: 20 June 1941
- Identification: Code Letters DOVB (1939–40); Code Letters GLZX (1940–41); Pennant number D10 (1941)
- Honours and awards: Atlantic 1941
- Captured: 7 March 1940
- Fate: Sunk 21 December 1941

General characteristics
- Type: Escort carrier
- Tonnage: 5,537 GRT
- Displacement: 11,000 long tons (11,177 t)
- Length: 441 ft 9 in (134.65 m) (Hannover); 467 ft 3 in (142.42 m) (HMS Audacity)
- Beam: 56 ft 3 in (17.15 m)
- Draught: 23 ft 1 in (7.04 m) (Hannover); 27 ft 6 in (8.38 m) (HMS Audacity)
- Installed power: 5,200 hp (3,900 kW)
- Propulsion: 1 × 7-cylinder MAN diesel engine; 1 × screw
- Speed: 15 knots (28 km/h; 17 mph)
- Complement: As HMS Audacity: 480
- Sensors & processing systems: Type 79B air warning radar
- Armament: As HMS Audacity: 1 × 4 inches (102 mm) gun; 1 × 6-pounder (57 mm (2.24 in)) gun; 4 × QF 2-pounder anti-aircraft guns; 4 × 20 mm (0.79 in) anti-aircraft cannons
- Aircraft carried: Operational Use: 6; Storage: 8
- Aviation facilities: None; aircraft stored on flight deck

HMS Audacity was a British escort carrier of the Second World War and the first of her kind to serve in the Royal Navy. She was originally the German merchant ship Hannover, which the British captured in the West Indies in March 1940 and renamed Sinbad, then Empire Audacity. She was converted and commissioned as HMS Empire Audacity, then as HMS Audacity. She was torpedoed and sunk by a German U-boat in late 1941.

== History ==
=== Hannover ===
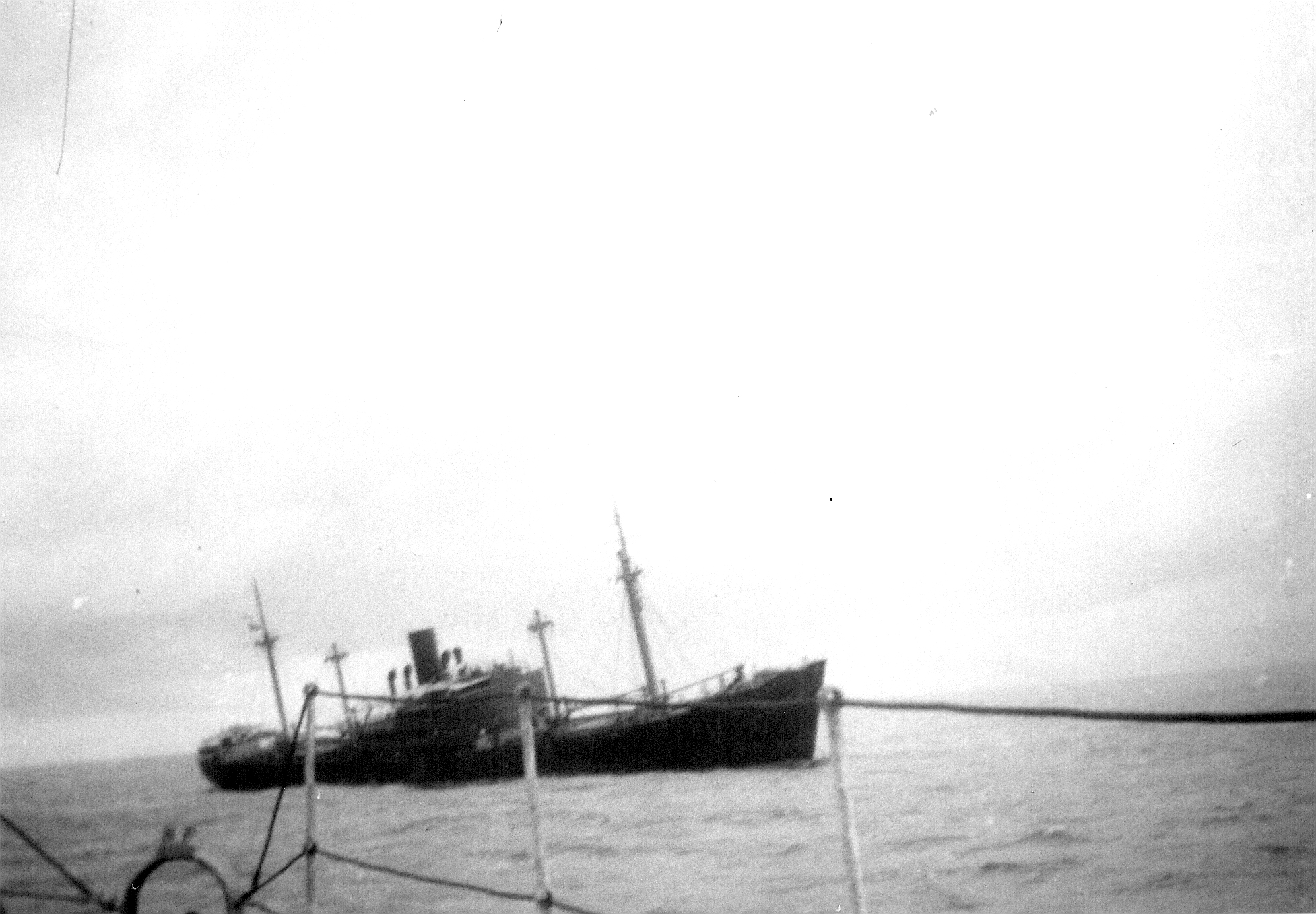
MV Hannover listing before her capture on 6 March 1940

Hannover was a 5,537 GRT cargo liner built by Bremer Vulkan Schiff- und Maschinenbau, Vegesack and launched on 29 March 1939. She was owned by Norddeutscher Lloyd and plied between Germany and the West Indies on the banana run. Hannover's port of registry was Bremen. When World War II began, Hannover sought refuge in Curaçao, Netherlands Antilles. In March 1940, Hannover attempted to return to Germany as a blockade runner. She was sighted between Hispaniola and Puerto Rico on the night of 7/8 March by the light cruiser Dunedin and the Canadian destroyer HMCS Assiniboine. Hannover was ordered to stop, but ignored the order and tried to reach the neutral waters of the Dominican Republic. When Dunedin and Assiniboine intercepted Hannover, Captain Wahnschaffe ordered the seacocks opened and the ship set on fire. A boarding party from Dunedin closed the sea cocks and Hannover was taken under tow. However, it took four days for the salvage crew to put out the fire. Hannover was then towed to Jamaica, arriving on 11 March. Acting Lieutenant A. W. Hughes of Dunedin was mentioned in despatches for his part in securing Hannover. Damage was mainly confined to her electrical system.

=== Sinbad ===
Hannover was renamed Sinbad, given a UK Official Number and assigned new Code Letters. Her port of registry was changed to Kingston, Jamaica, under the British flag. Her cargo included 29 barrels of pickled sheep pelts, which were offered for sale by tender in August 1940 as a result of being declared as prize.

=== Empire Audacity ===
Sinbad was renamed Empire Audacity as one of the Empire ships of the Ministry of War Transport and was commissioned as an "Ocean Boarding Vessel" on 11 November. Her port of registry was changed to London. She was placed under the management of Cunard White Star Line Ltd. On 22 January 1941, she was sent to Blyth Dry Docks & Shipbuilding Co Ltd, Blyth to be rebuilt as an escort carrier. Britain did not have enough aircraft carriers and shipping was vulnerable to attacks by U-boats in the Mid-Atlantic Gap, where there was no air cover. The Admiralty decided that small carriers were part of the solution and had a number of merchantmen, including Empire Audacity, converted. Empire Audacity was the largest ship handled at Blyth, which was more used to ships of 300 ft (91 m) length. The townsfolk of Blyth wondered why the superstructure of a perfectly good ship was being scrapped at a time when Britain was desperately short of ships. Empire Audacity was commissioned on 17 June 1941. She was the Royal Navy's first escort carrier.

=== HMS Empire Audacity ===
HMS Empire Audacity worked up in the Clyde. The first deck landing was by a Grumman Martlet of 802 Naval Air Squadron (FAA) on 10 July. A detachment of aircraft were based on Empire Audacity from 19 to 21 July. All her aircraft had to be stored on the flight deck, as the hasty conversion into an escort carrier did not include a hangar deck. The Admiralty disliked her merchant name, and HMS Empire Audacity was renamed HMS Audacity on 31 July 1941.

=== HMS Audacity ===
Audacity was put into full service, embarking eight Martlets of No. 802 Squadron FAA. The use of only fighters was a major departure from later practice, where the main component was anti-submarine patrol aircraft, but she was used to support Gibraltar convoys and the only perceived threat was the German long-range Focke-Wulf Fw 200 Condor reconnaissance/bomber aircraft.

Audacity participated in four convoys during her short career.

OG 74

Convoy OG 74 sailed from Britain on 13 September 1941. A week later on 21 September the convoy was attacked by a German Condor bomber, whose bombs struck the convoy rescue ship Walmer Castle. A fighter from Audacity was able to shoot down the bomber. The damage to Walmer Castle was extensive, and she had to be sunk by an escorting corvette.

HG 74

Convoy HG 74 sailed from Gibraltar on 2 October and arrived at the Clyde on 17 October. The trip was uneventful.

OG 76

Convoy OG 76 sailed on 28 October bound for Gibraltar. During the voyage, Martlets from Audacity shot down four Condors, one being the first aerial victory for Eric "Winkle" Brown. One Martlet was lost.

HG 76

Convoy HG 76 sailed from Gibraltar on 14 December. Audacity had only four Martlet aircraft serviceable. The convoy came under attack from 12 U-boats. Martlets from Audacity shot down two Condors; U-131 was attacked on 17 December. U-131 shot down a Martlet, but was unable to dive after the attack, and was scuttled by her crew, who were taken prisoner.

As Audacity left the convoy on the night of 21 December, one of the merchantmen fired a "snowflake" flare which revealed her in silhouette to the German U-boats. The submarines had been given specific orders to sink her as she had caused a lot of trouble for the Germans both at sea and in the air. The first torpedo fired by U-751 under Kapitänleutnant Gerhard Bigalk hit her in the engine room and she began to settle by the stern. The next two torpedoes caused an explosion of the aviation fuel blowing off her bow. Audacity sank some 500 mi (430 nmi; 800 km) west of Cape Finisterre at 43°45′N 19°54′W. She sank in 70 minutes. 73 of her crew were killed. Her survivors were picked up by the corvettes Convolvulus, Marigold and Pentstemon, one of the survivors being pilot Eric Brown. The German commander had confused her with a 23,000 long tons (23,369 t) Illustrious-class aircraft carrier, the sinking of which was announced by Nazi propaganda sources.

Location of the sinking of HMS Audacity

Audacity had been operating outside the convoy, a procedure that was later prohibited by the Admiralty as too risky.

== Official number and code letters ==
Official Numbers were a forerunner to IMO Numbers. Sinbad and Empire Audacity had the UK Official Number 156145. Hannover used the Code Letters DOBV. Empire Audacity used the Code Letters GLXZ.

== Model ==
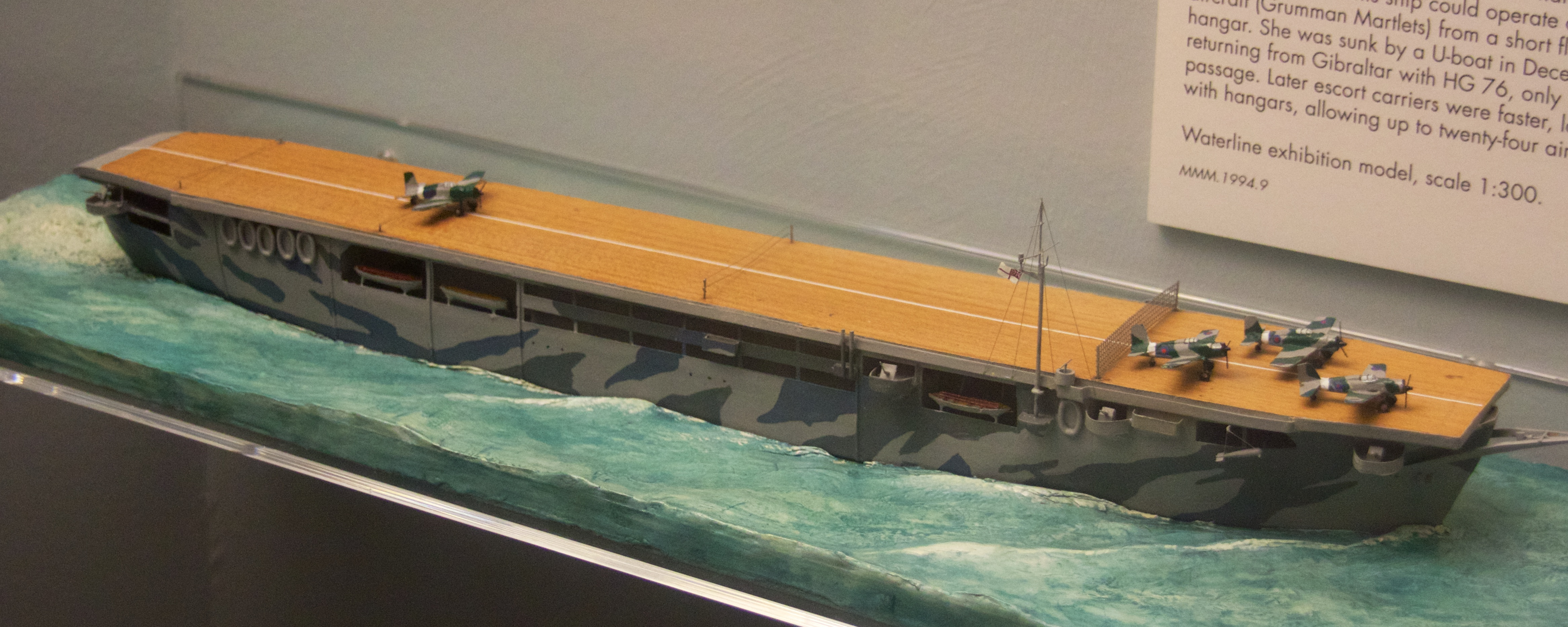
Model of Audacity in the Merseyside Maritime Museum.

A model of HMS Audacity is displayed in the Merseyside Maritime Museum.

== See also ==
- Merchant aircraft carrier – other British conversions of cargo ships to escort aircraft carriers
