= Convoy HG 76 =

Convoy during naval battles of the Second World War

- Part of Second World War
- Map of the Bay of Biscay and the South-western Approaches
Date	19–23 December 1941
Location	Bay of Biscay, South-west Approaches 45°30′N 04°20′W
Result	British victory

Belligerents
Germany	United Kingdom

Commanders and leaders
Karl Dönitz	Raymond Fitzmaurice; Frederick Walker

Strength
Wolfpack Seeräuber; 10 U-boats	32 merchant ships; 24 escorts

Casualties and losses
5 U-boats destroyed; 2 Aircraft shot down	2 merchant ships sunk; 1 escort carrier sunk; 1 escorting destroyer sunk; 3 Aircraft destroyed

Convoy HG 76 (19 to 23 December 1941) was an Allied convoy of the HG (Homeward from Gibraltar) series, during the Second World War. It was notable for the destruction of five German U-boats, although the true total was not known to the British until after the war.

Two Condor long-range reconnaissance aircraft were shot down by British Martlet fighters from the escort carrier HMS Audacity, which was sunk later on the voyage, along with a destroyer and two merchant ships. Despite the loss of Audacity, it was regarded as the first big convoy victory for the Allies in the Battle of the Atlantic.

== Background ==
The attack on Convoy HG 76 was the last in a series of U-boat pack attacks on Gibraltar convoys which had started in the summer of 1941. Before this the U-boat Arm (U-bootwaffe) had only enough boats operational to form one patrol line at a time and their focus was on the North Atlantic convoy route. Gibraltar convoys had suffered only occasional adventitious attacks by individual U-boats that met them while crossing their route. By the summer 1941 U-boat Command (BdU) had sufficient boats to form several patrol lines but this coincided with Hitler ordering U-boats into the Mediterranean to support Axis forces operating in North Africa and attack the Gibraltar traffic. This phase of the campaign had commenced with a pack attack on Convoy OG 69.

For the Allies the introduction of specialist escort groups had created the conditions for better of convoy protection tactics, giving a measure of success in countering the wolf pack threat. It was recognised that air cover was needed to counter shadowing aircraft, to seek out approaching U-boats and for reinforcement of convoys under attack. Sufficient escorts were needed to hunt U-boats to destruction rather than driving them off, as so often happened. The first requirement was met with the commissioning of Audacity, the first merchant aircraft carrier, the second by reinforcing the escorts and by the formation of an anti-submarine Hunting Group at Gibraltar, which would sweep ahead of a homeward bound convoy, to attack and destroy patrolling U-boats. The new measures had been introduced by the time Convoy HG 76 sailed.

== Prelude ==
=== HMS Audacity ===
Audacity participated in the escort of Convoy OG 76 of twenty merchant ships, which sailed from Liverpool for Gibraltar on 31 October. The escort carrier embarked 802 Naval Air Squadron (802 NAS), Fleet Air Arm (FAA) with eight Martlets and ten pilots. The fighters were usually split into standing patrols of two aircraft, which flew over the convoy for about two hours, searching for U-boats and Condors, the danger mainly coming from deck landings. The weather was atrocious and at times pitched the flight deck 65 ft (20 m) and rolled it through 16 ° as spray swept over the deck. Two Martlets took off on patrol and one managed a safe landing but the other touched down when the stern was rising and was thrown overboard, the pilot being rescued just before the Martlet sank.

On 8 November, Kampfgeschwader 40 (KG 40) sent six Condor reconnaissance bombers to locate Convoy SL 91, bound for Liverpool from Freetown, Sierra Leone. Near noon, the radar on Audacity detected two Condors and a Martlet patrol was sent to intercept. One Condor escaped into a cloud but two Martlets caught the second, which shot down one Martlet before being shot down by the other Martlet. About three hours later, another Condor was shot down by a Martlet making a head-on attack and a fourth Condor escaped. KG 40 had lost a third of its operational aircraft and failed to direct any U-boats onto either convoy, Convoy OG 76 making a safe arrival at Gibraltar late on 11 November. The presence of Audacity was now known to KG 40 and to BdU.

=== Convoy HG 76 ===
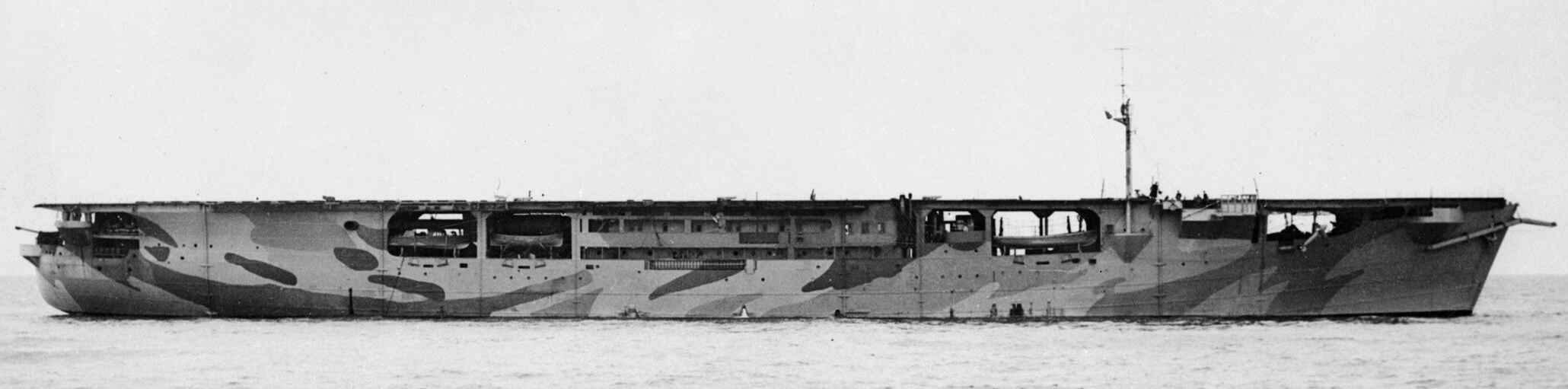
HMS Audacity, after conversion to an escort carrier

Convoy HG 76 comprised 32 ships homeward bound from Gibraltar, some in ballast and some carrying cargo. The Convoy Commodore was Vice-Admiral R. Fitzmaurice in the steamship Spero. The convoy had a large escort force, consisting of the 36th Escort Group (Commander Frederick "Johnnie" Walker), usually composed of two Bittern-class sloops (HMS Stork and Deptford) and seven corvettes (HMS Convolvulus, Gardenia, Marigold, Pentstemon, Rhodedendron, Samphire and Vetch). Walker, an experienced escort commander, had taken command of Escort Group 36 in October and brought the it down to Gibraltar in November with Convoy OG 76. He had exercised the group there in anti-submarine patrols that had resulted in the destruction of U-433 by Marigold. The close escort was augmented by a support group comprising the new escort carrier HMS Audacity and her escorting destroyers, Blankney, Stanley and Exmoor, plus the sloops Fowey, Black Swan and the corvettes HMS Carnation and La Malouine, also at Gibraltar, 17 ships in all. A U-boat hunter group of Force H destroyers from Gibraltar, comprising HMS Croome, Gurkha, Foxhound and Nestor sailed independently.

=== Seeräuber ===
Since August 1940, Dönitz had ended the practice of U-boats freelancing and sending only one report per day. U-boat commanders were ordered to signal whenever they found a convoy and shadow it rather than attack. The commander was to send short homing signals every thirty minutes, to guide other U-boats to the convoy. When the pack had assembled, Dönitz gave the order to attack, usually at night, so that the U-boats could fire their torpedoes on the surface. For the tactic to work, U-boats had to signal their positions to Dönitz at Kerneval (across the river from the submarine base at Lorient in Brittany). (Note: If the British could break into naval Enigma, the position reports would be read.) Closer to land, when Condors on tracking patrol (Fühlungshalter) sighted a convoy, the wireless operator reported its position and course to the BdU and relays of Condors remained over the convoy. When the pack had rendezvoused near the convoy, surface attacks would be made on successive nights, the U-boats withdrawing during the day.

In mid December, BdU was informed that a convoy was assembling at Gibraltar. German agents in Algeciras, in neutral Spain, could see the harbour without hindrance from the Spanish authorities. BdU began to assemble a patrol line, code-named Seeräuber (Pirate), preparatory to launching a pack attack. Seeräuber was an ad hoc group, as the previous Gruppe Steuben, had disbanded following a fruitless pursuit of southbound Convoy OS 12. Gruppe Seeräuber comprised seven U-boats; U-67 was already in position after a failed attack on Convoy OG 77; U-434 and U-574 from Gruppe Steuben had refuelled from a clandestine depot ship in Vigo harbour, U-127 and U-131 had arrived from Germany and U-107 and U-108 from bases in France. Five of the seven were Type IX boats, which Dönitz considered unsuitable for pack attacks and five of the seven crews were inexperienced, being on their first patrols. The pack had orders to sink Audacity at all costs and was reinforced later by three more boats; U-108 sank a Portuguese freighter sailing independently on 14 December.

== Battle ==
=== 14–15 December ===
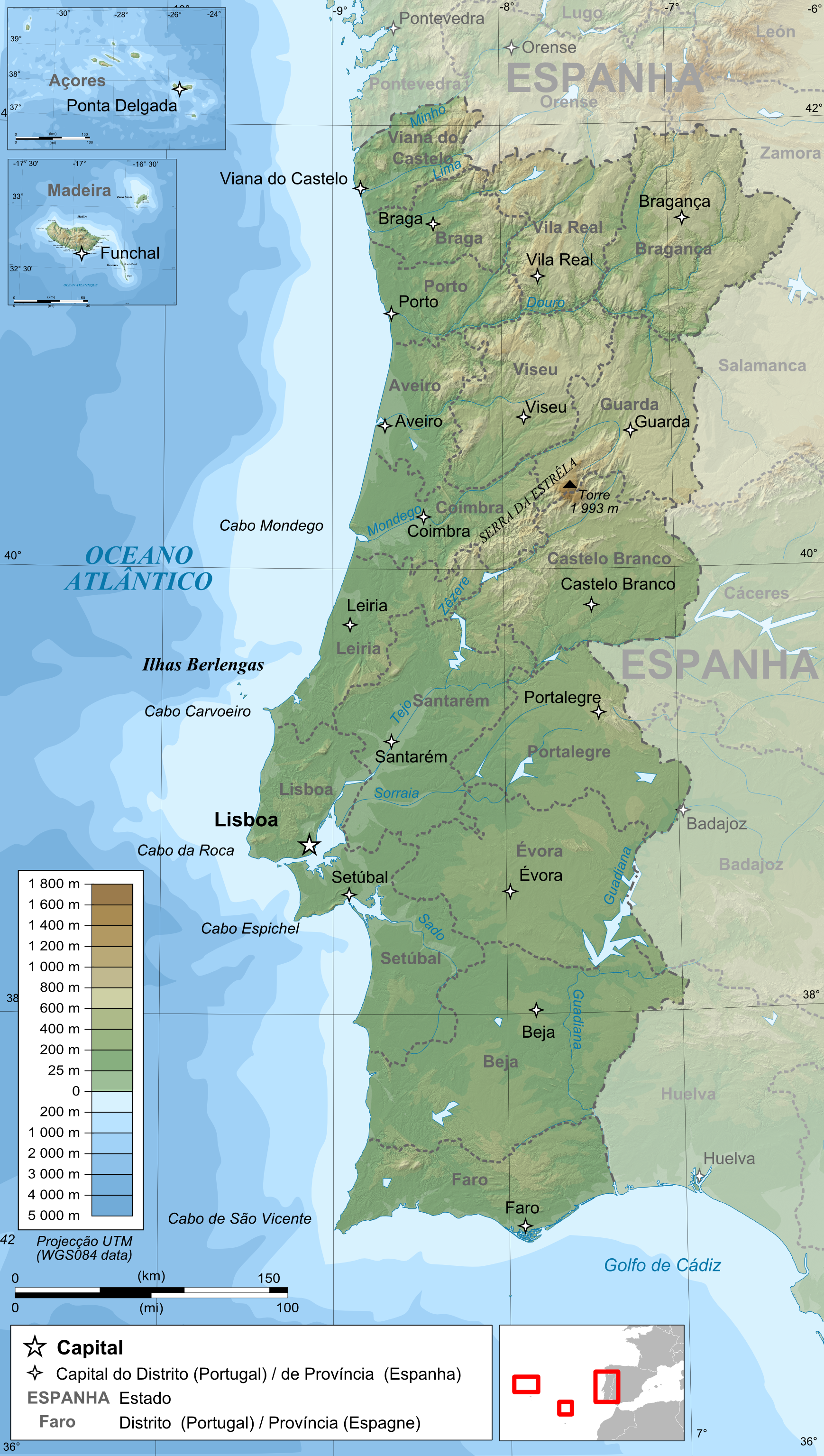
Topographic map showing Cape St Vincent (Cabo de São Vicente) at the south-west extremity

Convoy HG 76 sailed from Gibraltar on 14 December 1941, in company with a small convoy bound for Cape Town. Agents across the bay, reported the composition, escort strength and departure time of the convoy. BdU was confused by an agent report that the convoy had returned to port. The first sightings of Convoy HG 76 were made by U-74 and U-77, both en route to the Mediterranean and about to pass the Straits. U-77 sank one ship from the Cape Town convoy, but U-74 was unable to attack Convoy HG 76; Swordfish aircraft of RAF Gibraltar Command were escorting the convoy and on three occasions during the night of 14/15 December, drove off the U-boats. The Seerauber boats formed a patrol line south of Cape St Vincent but Convoy HG 76 passed through the line without detection. At 8:15 a.m. Hudson and Catalina aircraft took over from the Swordfish and for the next two days co-operated with the 802 NAS Martlets on Audacity, forcing U-boats to submerge. U-127 was detected on a routine anti-submarine sweep by a Short Sunderland from Gibraltar late in the day; next morning it was detected on Asdic by Nestor and sunk at 11:00 a.m.

=== 16–18 December ===
At noon on 16 December, Convoy HG 76 was sighted and its position reported by a Focke-Wulf Condor of I/KG 40 patrolling from Bordeaux, which guided U-108 to the convoy to begin reporting its position to other U-boats. During the night of 16/17 December, the wolf pack closed in and U-574 was ordered to the area; by morning on 17 December, the convoy had passed beyond the range of Gibraltar-based aircraft and four U-boats made contact, U-67 and U-108 being forced away from the convoy. Just after 9:00 a.m. a Martlet from Audacity sighted a surfaced U-boat about 20 nmi (37 km; 23 mi) from the convoy and circled over the area for the escort ships to gain a good radar fix; a corvette made an Asdic attack to no apparent effect. At 12:47 p.m. on 17 December, Stanley sighted U-131 on the surface and Walker ordered a Martlet to attack while Stork, with Pentstemon and the three destroyers, made their best speed to the location.

The Martlet pilot dived towards the U-boat and both opened fire at the same time, the Martlet being shot down and the pilot killed. The British ships opened fire at extreme range, then U-131 was driven to the surface and sunk. (Note: In 2005, Rohwer and Hümmelchen wrote that the U-boat was scuttled.) Observers saw the crew of U-131 abandon the vessel before it sank at 1:30 p.m. and took on survivors who said that they had been shadowing the convoy (claiming to have spent the previous night inside the convoy, homing other U-boats) and had been the U-boat attacked earlier. On the night of 17/18 December, the U-boats attacked again but failed to torpedo any ships; U-107 was forced under water by Pentstemon and after a failed torpedo attack, U-67 was forced to retire by Convolvulus.

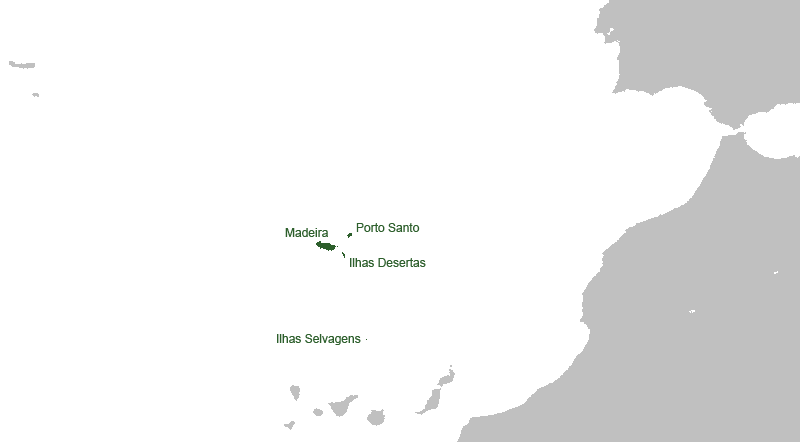
Location of Madeira

At 9:06 a.m. on 18 December, Stanley gained an Asdic contact at 6 nmi (11 km; 6.9 mi) and fifty depth charges were dropped by the escorts. After thirty minutes U-434 surfaced and the crew abandoned ship just before it rolled over and sank, north of Madeira, 42 members of the crew being rescued and taken prisoner. Before noon, the radar on Audacity indicated two aircraft and Martlets were scrambled to intercept but the guns on both aircraft jammed and the Condors escaped. The rest of the day was quiet but the Admiralty signalled that three more U-boats were en route. In the early hours of 18/19 December, Stanley sighted U-574 astern at 4:00 a.m., sent a sighting report, was hit by a torpedo and blew up. Stork following behind, swung behind the stern of Stanley, gained an Asdic contact and dropped a pattern of depth charges, then turned after 0.5 nmi (0.93 km; 0.58 mi) to attack again.

A U-boat shot to the surface 200 yd (180 m) ahead and a chase began; Walker tried to ram the U-boat but found that it could turn inside the turning circle of Stork, nearly as fast. The ship fired on the U-boat, illuminated it with snowflake flares and managed to ram it just forward of the conning tower, scraping over the hull of the submarine. As the U-boat emerged from under the stern, depth charges set for shallow were dropped, blowing up the U-boat. The bows of Stork were crushed and bent sideways and the Asdic dome under the hull was smashed. Soon afterwards, U-108 torpedoed Ruckinge, which was abandoned and sunk later by Samphire. Condors arrived, one was shot down in another head-on attack and a second aircraft was damaged. When more Condors reached the convoy in the afternoon, a Martlet pilot made such a determined head-on attack that he collided with the Condor, destroying it and coming back with its aerial round his tail-wheel; the night of 18/19 December was quiet.

=== 19–21 December ===
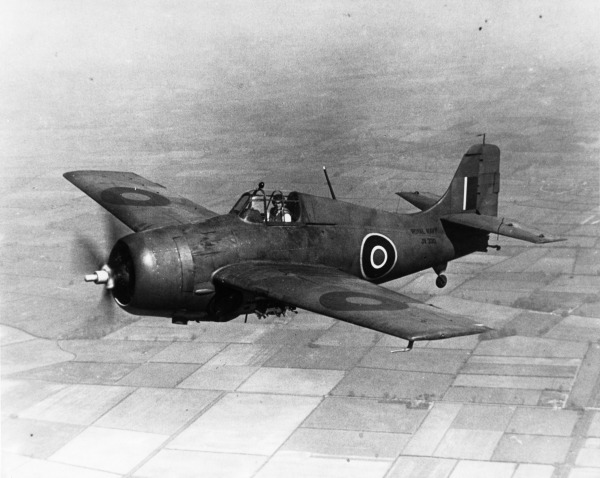
FAA Grumman Martlet

At 7:30 a.m., a Condor appeared to shadow the convoy and a Martlet chased it away before returning for lack of fuel. In the afternoon a Martlet spotted two U-boats and the convoy made an emergency turn. The U-boats were forced to submerge and Martlets patrolled overhead keeping them down for as long as their fuel lasted. It was so dark that the aircraft were guided to the flight deck with hand torches and again the night was quiet. U-107 maintained contact and the wolf pack was joined by U-71, U-567 (commanded by the ace Engelbert Endrass) and U-751 from Bordeaux and the three original wolf pack boats U-67, U-107 and U-108 re-joined Seeräuber by 21 December.

On 21 December, 802 NAS was down to three operational Martlets, take-off and landing was dangerous in the heavy swell and the pilots were very tired. After the last patrol, the commander of Audacity ordered the ship out of the convoy 10 nmi (19 km; 12 mi) to the starboard as usual but no escorts could be spared. At 8:33 p.m. during the night of 21/22 December, the 3,324 GRT SS Annavore, at the rear of the convoy, was torpedoed by U-567. Nearby ships fired snowflakes, illuminating the area for both sides and the commander of U-751 saw the silhouette of Audacity at close range and torpedoed it at 8:37 p.m. As the carrier sank by the stern, it was hit by two more torpedoes from U-751, a big explosion blew off the bows and the ship began to sink at the head. At 10:10 p.m., Audacity sank head first at 43°45'N, 19°54'W, about 500 nmi (930 km; 580 mi) west of Cape Finisterre.

=== 22–23 December ===
Position of Audacity when sunk

At 12:40 a.m. on the night of 21/22 December, U-567 was sunk by depth charges from Deptford, two hours after gaining an Asdic contact; Deptford then collided with Stork, damaging them both. U-67 fired torpedoes at a CAM ship but missed. During 22 December, U-71 and U-751 remained in contact, to be joined by U-125 (en route to America), while Convoy HG 76 was reinforced by the destroyers HMS Vanquisher and Witch. At 10:54 a.m. a Liberator of 120 Squadron, 19 Group Coastal Command based at RAF Nutts Corner in Ireland (750 nmi (1,390 km; 860 mi) away) arrived over the convoy and saw off a Condor. After two hours the Liberator attacked a U-boat and at 4:20 p.m. was relieved by a second Liberator, which forced another three U-boats to submerge. The Liberator turned for home with minimal fuel but next day the convoy came into range of continuous air support. On 23 December, Dönitz, shaken by the loss of five U-boats and the lack of success against the convoy, called off the attack, U-67, U-107, U-108 and U-751 returned to bases in France.

== Aftermath ==
Despite the loss of Audacity and the three merchant ships, the safe arrival of thirty ships and the destruction of three U-boats (U-127 was not included and U-567 not confirmed until after the war) was judged by the Admiralty to be an outstanding victory. It also confirmed Walker as the Royal Navy's foremost expert in anti-submarine warfare. The loss of five of the nine U-boats and Endrass, one of the most experienced U-boat commanders, was considered a grievous blow by Dönitz; his loss was concealed from the U-boat men for several weeks.

== Orders of battle ==
=== Merchant ships ===
Convoy HG 76 comprised 32 merchant ships
Name	Year	Flag	GRT	Notes
Adjutant	1922	Merchant Navy	1,931	
Algerian	1924	Merchant Navy	2,315	
Alresford	1922	Merchant Navy	2,472	
Annavore	1921	Norway	3,324	Sunk, 21 December, U-567, 43°55'N 19°50'W, 34†, 4 surv
Baron Newlands	1928	Merchant Navy	3,386	
Benwood	1910	Norway	3,931	
Blairatholl	1925	Merchant Navy	3,319	
Cisneros	1926	Merchant Navy	1,886	
Clan Macinnes	1920	Merchant Navy	4,672	
Cressado	1913	Merchant Navy	1,228	Convoy Commodore Rear-Admiral Oswald Dawson embarked
Disa	1918	Sweden	2,002	
Empire Darwin	1941	Merchant Navy	6,765	CAM ship
Fagersten	1921	Norway	2,342	
Finland	1939	Merchant Navy	1,375	
Fylingdale	1924	Merchant Navy	3,918	
Lago	1929	Norway	2,552	
Lisbeth	1922	Norway	2,732	
Meta	1930	Merchant Navy	1,575	
Ocean Coast	1935	Merchant Navy	1,173	
Ogmore Castle	1919	Merchant Navy	2,481	
Ottinge	1940	Merchant Navy	2,870	
Ousel	1922	Merchant Navy	1,533	
Portsea	1938	Merchant Navy	1,583	
Ruckinge	1939	Merchant Navy	2,869	Damaged, 19 December, U-108, scuttled 38°20'N, 17°15'W, 2†
San Gorg	1919	Merchant Navy	615	
Sheaf Crown	1929	Merchant Navy	4,868	
Shuna	1937	Merchant Navy	1,575	
Spero	1922	Merchant Navy	1,589	Convoy Commodore, Vice-Admiral Raymond Fitzmaurice
Switzerland	1922	Merchant Navy	1,291	
Thyra	1925	Sweden	1,796	
Tintern Abbey	1939	Merchant Navy	2,471	
Vanellus	1921	Merchant Navy	1,886	

=== Convoy escorts ===
Convoy escorts (in relays)
Name	Flag	Type	Dates	Notes
HMS Audacity	Royal Navy	Escort carrier	14–21 December 1941	Sunk by U-751, 21 December 1941
HMS Black Swan	Royal Navy	Black Swan-class sloop	14–16 December 1941	
HMS Blankney	Royal Navy	Hunt-class destroyer	14–18 December 1941	
HMS Campion	Royal Navy	Flower-class corvette	15–16 December 1941	
HMS Carnation	Royal Navy	Flower-class corvette	14–15 December 1941	
HMS Coltsfoot	Royal Navy	Flower-class corvette	16 December 1941	
HMS Convolvulus	Royal Navy	Flower-class corvette	14–30 December 1941	
HMS Deptford	Royal Navy	Grimsby-class sloop	14–22 December 1941	Collided with Stork, 22 December
HMS Exmoor	Royal Navy	Hunt-class destroyer	14–18 December 1941	
HMS Fowey	Royal Navy	Shoreham-class sloop	14–16 December 1941	
HMS Gardenia	Royal Navy	Flower-class corvette	14–19 December 1941	
HMS Hesperus	Royal Navy	H-class destroyer	16 December 1941	
HMS Jonquil	Royal Navy	Flower-class corvette	14–30 December 1941	
HMS La Malouine	Royal Navy	Flower-class corvette	14–16 December 1941	
HMS Marigold	Royal Navy	Flower-class corvette	14–30 December 1941	
HMS Pentstemon	Royal Navy	Flower-class corvette	14–30 December 1941	
HMS Rhododendron	Royal Navy	Flower-class corvette	14–30 December 1941	
HMS Samphire	Royal Navy	Flower-class corvette	14–30 December 1941	
HMS Stanley	Royal Navy	Town-class destroyer	14–19 December 1941	Sunk by U-574
HMS Stork	Royal Navy	Bittern-class sloop	14–22 December 1941	Collided with Deptford 22 December
HMS Vanoc	Royal Navy	V-class destroyer	23–29 December 1941	
HMS Vanquisher	Royal Navy	V-class destroyer	23–29 December 1941	
HMS Vetch	Royal Navy	Flower-class corvette	14–30 December 1941	
HMS Volunteer	Royal Navy	W-class destroyer	25–29 December 1941	
HMS Witch	Royal Navy	W-class destroyer	23–29 December 1941	

=== Force H hunting group ===
Force H
Name	Flag	Type	Notes
HMS Croome	Royal Navy	Hunt-class destroyer	
HMS Gurkha	Royal Navy	L-class destroyer	
HMS Foxhound	Royal Navy	F-class destroyer	
HMAS Nestor	Royal Navy	N-class destroyer	Sank U-127, 14 December 1941

=== U-boats ===
Gruppe Seerauber was assembled on 14 December 1941, comprising seven U-boats and reinforced on 21 December by three more. Four U-boats were sunk when attacking the convoy and another by the Gibraltar Strike Force.

Gruppe Seerauber
Name	Flag	Class	Notes
U-67	Kriegsmarine	Type IXC submarine	
U-71	Kriegsmarine	Type VIIC submarine	Reinforcement
U-107	Kriegsmarine	Type IXB submarine	
U-108	Kriegsmarine	Type IXB submarine	Sank Ruckinge
U-127	Kriegsmarine	Type IXC submarine	Destroyed 15 December, Nestor, Force H hunting group
U-131	Kriegsmarine	Type IXB submarine	Destroyed 17 December, Stork, Penstemon, Martlet
U-434	Kriegsmarine	Type VIIC submarine	Destroyed 18 December, Stanley
U-567	Kriegsmarine	Type VIIC submarine	Reinforcement; sank Annavore, destroyed 21/22 December, Deptford
U-574	Kriegsmarine	Type VIIC submarine	Sank Stanley, destroyed 19 December, Stork
U-751	Kriegsmarine	Type VIIC submarine	Reinforcement, sank Audacity
