= Engelbert Endrass =

German WW2 U-Boat commander

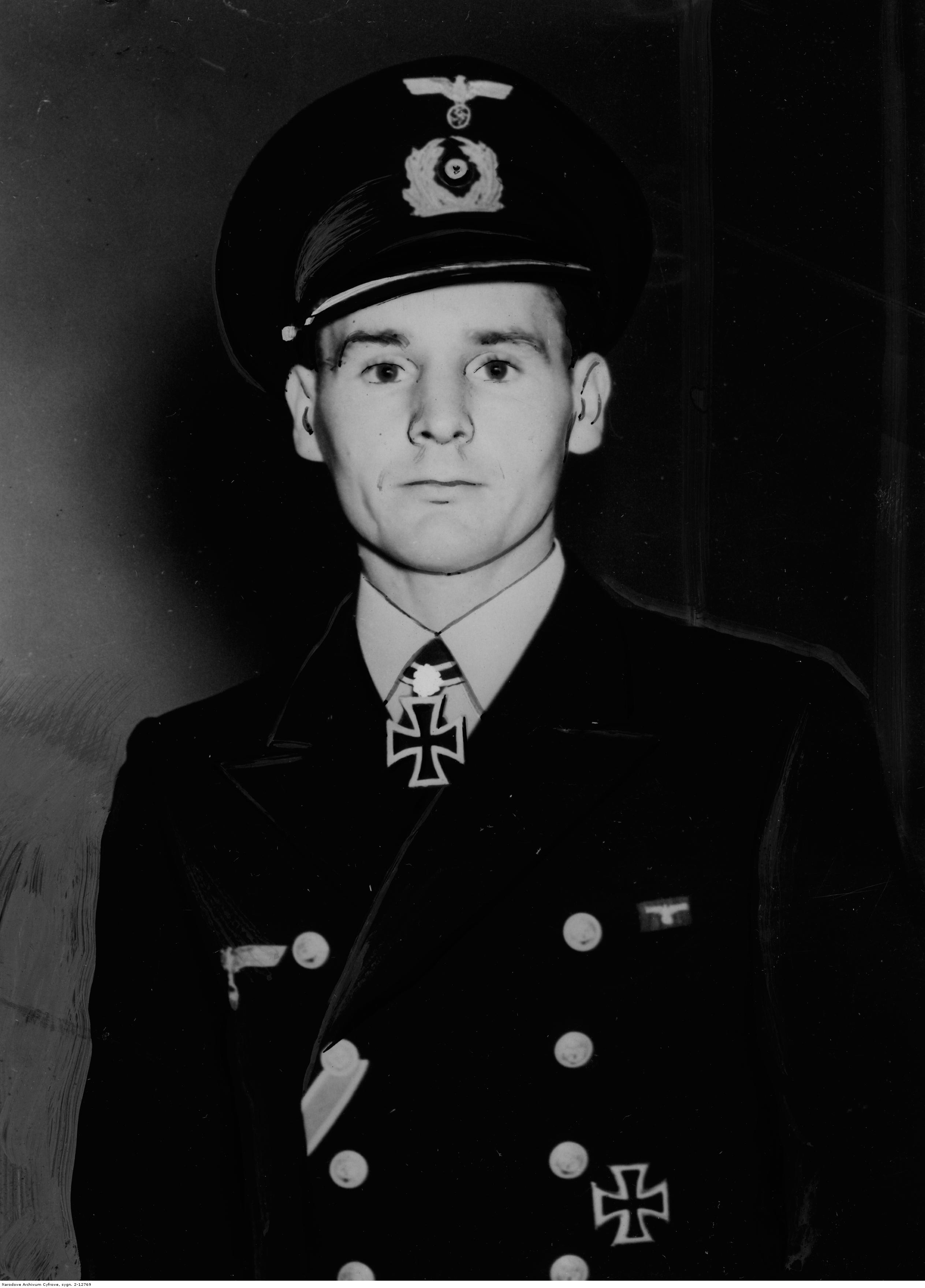
- Born: 2 March 1911; Bamberg
- Died: 21 December 1941 (aged 30); U-567, Atlantic Ocean, off Azores; 44°02′N 20°10′W
- Military career
- Allegiance: Nazi Germany
- Branch: Kriegsmarine
- Service years: 1935–41
- Rank: Kapitänleutnant
- Unit: 7th U-boat Flotilla
- Commands: U-46; U-567
- Awards: Knight's Cross with Oak Leaves

Engelbert Endrass (German: Engelbert Endraß) (2 March 1911 – 21 December 1941) was a German U-boat commander in World War II. He commanded the U-46 and the U-567, being credited with sinking 22 ships on ten patrols, for a total of 118,528 gross register tons (GRT) of Allied shipping, to purportedly become the 23rd highest claiming U-boat commander of World War II. He was a recipient of the Knight's Cross of the Iron Cross with Oak Leaves of Nazi Germany. It was Germany's highest military decoration at the time of its presentation to Endrass.

== Early life and career ==
Endrass began his naval career in April 1935. After some months on the cruiser Deutschland and service on escort ships, he was assigned in October 1937 to the U-boat force. He joined U-47 in December 1938 as Leutnant zur See.

== World War II ==
Engelbert Endrass was Watch Officer when his commanding officer, Günther Prien penetrated the defences at Scapa Flow attack and sank the battleship HMS Royal Oak in October 1939. The snorting bull emblem on U-47's conning tower was painted by Endrass before they returned. Endrass painted this symbol on all subsequent boats on which he served. The reason, given by Endrass for this, was the sight of Prien's demeanour as U-47 entered Scapa Flow, "his frowning face and hunched shoulders reminded him of a bull in a ring." Endrass remained on U-47 until May 1940, when he left and took over command of U-46 from the relatively unsuccessful Herbert Sohler, who had only sunk two ships in five patrols. Endrass had immediate success. He sank HMS Carinthia, an auxiliary cruiser, on his first patrol. The patrol yielded over 4,000 tons.

Snorting bull emblem on the conning tower painted by Endrass

Endrass' success continued on his second patrol with U-46, sinking five more ships, including another British auxiliary cruiser, HMS Dunvegan Castle although the main periscope was damaged. The ship carried 23,225 steel drums and 2,700 wooden barrels and 440 tons of timber. Endrass was forced to use three torpedoes, for the drums fitted to British ships in this period were to provide extra ballast. It made sinking them more difficult and more expensive in munitions expenditure. Her loss prompted the Commander-in-Chief, Western Approaches, Martin Dunbar-Nasmith, to order all Liverpool–bound ships to remain in convoy until past the Mull of Kintyre; 277 survivors were rescued by HMS Harvester and HMS Primrose.

Endrass and six other U-boats intercepted Convoy SC 7 and sank many ships. U-46 sank three during the three-day battle. The commander followed this up with an attack on Convoy HX 79, sinking two ships.

Five patrols later he received the Oak Leaves to his Knight's Cross. The presentation was made on 30 June 1941 by Adolf Hitler at the Führer Headquarters of the Wolfsschanze (Wolf's Lair) in Rastenburg (now Kętrzyn in Poland).

In September 1941 Endrass left U-46, which would become a training vessel and a month later took over U-567. On his second patrol, he was killed on 21 December 1941 while operating against Convoy HG 76, when U-567 was sunk with all hands by depth charges from HMS Deptford a Grimsby-class sloop and HMS Samphire a Flower-class corvette, northeast of the Azores.

== Awards ==
- Wehrmacht Long Service Award 4th Class (5 April 1939)
- Spanish Cross (6 June 1939)
- Iron Cross (1939)
  - 2nd Class (25 September 1939)
  - 1st Class (17 October 1939)
- U-boat War Badge (1939) (19 December 1939); with Diamonds (18 July 1941)
- Italian Croce di Guerra with Swords (1 November 1941)
- Knight's Cross of the Iron Cross with Oak Leaves
  - Knight's Cross on 5 September 1940 as Oberleutnant zur See and commander of U-46
  - 14th Oak Leaves on 10 June 1941 as Kapitänleutnant and commander of U-46
