= Gerhard Bigalk =

World War 2 German Submarine Captain

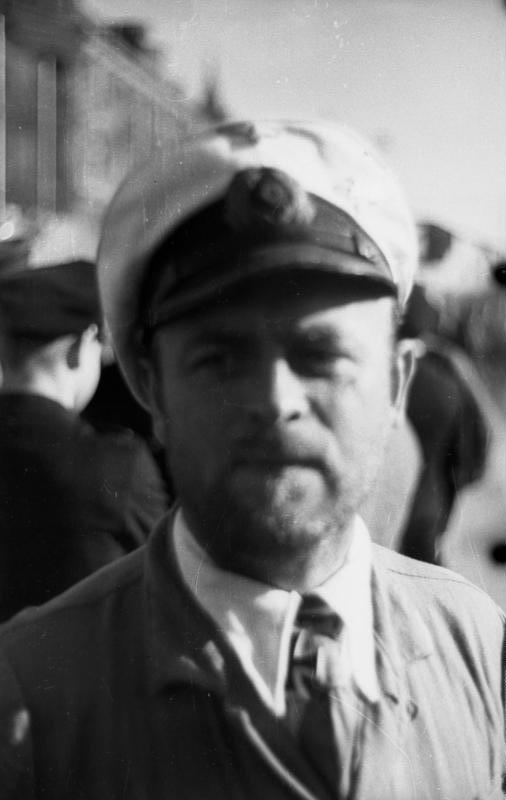
- Bigalk at St. Nazaire, 15 June 1942
- Born: 26 November 1908; Berlin-Niederschönhausen
- Died: 17 July 1942 (aged 33); U-751, North Atlantic Ocean, off Cape Ortegal, Spain
- Military career
- Allegiance: Nazi Germany
- Branch: Kriegsmarine
- Service years: 1934–42
- Rank: Korvettenkapitän
- Units: Schleswig-Holstein tender Saar; Condor Legion A/88; 24th U-boat Flotilla; 7th U-boat Flotilla
- Commands: U-14; U-751
- Conflicts: Spanish Civil War World War II: Battle of the Atlantic
- Awards: Knight's Cross of the Iron Cross

Gerhard Bigalk (26 November 1908 – 17 July 1942) was a captain with the Kriegsmarine during World War II and commander of U-751. He was a recipient of the Knight's Cross of the Iron Cross of Nazi Germany.

== Career ==
Bigalk spent some years in the merchant marine before joining the Kriegsmarine in April 1934. He initially trained as an observer in the naval air force, and saw service during the Spanish Civil War, making 21 combat flights in 1937. He joined the U-boat force in November 1939. He trained into 1940, taking command of the school boat U-14 between June and August 1940. He then took command of the newly built submarine U-751 when it commissioned in January 1941.

Between June 1941 and July 1942 Bigalk commanded U-751 on seven combat patrols, sinking six ships totalling 32,412 tons, and damaged one ship of 8,096 tons. This included the 11,000 ton British escort carrier HMS Audacity from convoy HG 76, sunk on 21 December 1941 during his fourth patrol, for which Bigalk was awarded the Knight's Cross.

Bigalk died on 17 July 1942 when U-751 was sunk with all hands by depth charges dropped by a Whitley bomber from No. 502 Squadron RAF and a Lancaster bomber from No. 61 Squadron RAF in the North Atlantic north-west of Cape Ortegal, Spain.

Bigalk received a posthumous promotion to Korvettenkapitän on 5 April 1945.

== Awards ==
- Luftwaffe Observation Badge (2 November 1936)
- Wehrmacht Long Service Award 4th Class (8 April 1938)
- Cruz roja Medalla de la Campaña (1 June 1939)
- Spanish Cross in Silver with Swords (1 June 1939)
- The Return of Sudetenland Commemorative Medal of 1 October 1938 (1 December 1939)
- Iron Cross (1939)
  - 2nd Class (30 November 1940)
  - 1st Class (26 December 1941)
- U-boat War Badge (1939) (7 July 1941)
- Knight's Cross of the Iron Cross on 26 December 1941 as Kapitänleutnant and commander of U-751
