= SS Fairfield =

UK cargo ship

History

United Kingdom
- Name: Fairfield
- Namesake: Fairfield, County Durham
- Owner: Aberdeen Coal & Shipping Co Ltd
- Builder: Eltringhams Ltd, South Shields
- Yard number: 310
- Launched: 17 December 1914
- Completed: 1915
- In service: 1915
- Out of service: 1922
- Identification: UK official number 137165; Call sign EICQ
- Fate: Sold

Ireland
- Name: Luimneach
- Namesake: Limerick (Irish: Luimneach)
- Owner: Limerick SS Co Ltd
- In service: 1922
- Out of service: 1940
- Fate: Sunk by naval gunfire 4 September 1940

General characteristics
- Type: Cargo ship
- Tonnage: 1,074 GRT
- Length: 220 ft (67 m)
- Beam: 34 ft (10 m)
- Draught: 14 ft (4.3 m)
- Decks: 3
- Installed power: 174 NHP
- Propulsion: 1 x 3 cyl. triple expansion engine, single screw
- Speed: 11 knots (20 km/h; 13 mph)
- Crew: 18

SS Fairfield was a UK cargo ship built in 1915 by Eltringham J. T. Ltd. of South Shields in county Tyne and Wear for the Aberdeen Coal & Shipping Co. The ship's wreck is located at 47°50′N 9°12′W at an approximate depth of 9,800 feet (3,000 m).

== Construction and service ==
The ship served primarily as an ore carrier on runs between ports in Spain and her home country for seven years before being sold to Irish owners, the Limerick Steamship Co, with whom she operated for the remainder of her career. The ship's new owners renamed her Luimneach, the Irish for Limerick. While in their service, in October 1938, during the Spanish Civil War, she was damaged by bombs in the harbour at Valencia, Spain, but repaired and returned to service. This event resulted in the death of one crew member.

=== Final voyage and loss ===
Luimneach departed Huelva on 2 September 1940 under the command of Eric Septimus Jones, transporting 1,250 tons of pyrites back to Drogheda, Ireland. Although her cargo could be considered war material, as both her port of origination and destination were neutral parties she sailed under guaranteed neutrality protections as provided by the Law of Maritime Neutrality. As such, she had no escort. Two days out of port, she was stopped in international waters by the German U-boat U-46, under the command of Engelbert Endrass, with two shots across her bow about 170 miles (270 km) west-southwest of Ushant.

Some confusion existed between parties in this incident, with the merchant crew believing the submarine was Italian while Endrass was unsure of the nationality of the ship he had stopped. Among the crew of Luimneach were three men from belligerent nations (two British and one Maltese), and it is possible that is why the merchant crew abandoned ship. Endrass also reported in his log that the merchant crew "lost their heads completely" at the shots across their bow, adding to the confusion aboard a neutral-flagged vessel under fire in a time of war. Having left their ship in a single, overcrowded lifeboat, without provisions, Endrass ordered them to return and launch the second lifeboat, which they did. He then provided rations, cigarettes, and alcohol before sinking Luimneach with U-46's deck gun.

== Survivors ==
The lifeboats proceeded separately, eventually being rescued by two different French fishing vessels. The starboard lifeboat, containing the master and eight crew, was picked up by St. Pierre, which subsequently transferred them to a Spanish trawler that landed them at Pasajes on 13 September. The port lifeboat was treated differently, as among the nine crew aboard were three from nations hostile to Vichy France. These men were landed at Lorient on 6 September and handed over to Germany as prisoners of war while the remaining men, one Belgian and five Irish, were allowed to return home.
