= RMS Carinthia =

RMS Carinthia may refer to:

- RMS Carinthia (1925), a British Cunard Line passenger ship launched in 1925 and sunk in 1940
- RMS Carinthia (1955), a British Cunard Line passenger ship launched in 1955 and scrapped in 2006 after several changes of ownership and name
