= K99 =

K99 or K-99 may refer to:

- K-99 (Kansas highway), a state highway in Kansas
- HMS Gardenia (K99), a former UK Royal Navy ship
