= MS Dunnottar Castle =

Passenger ship later renamed Victoria

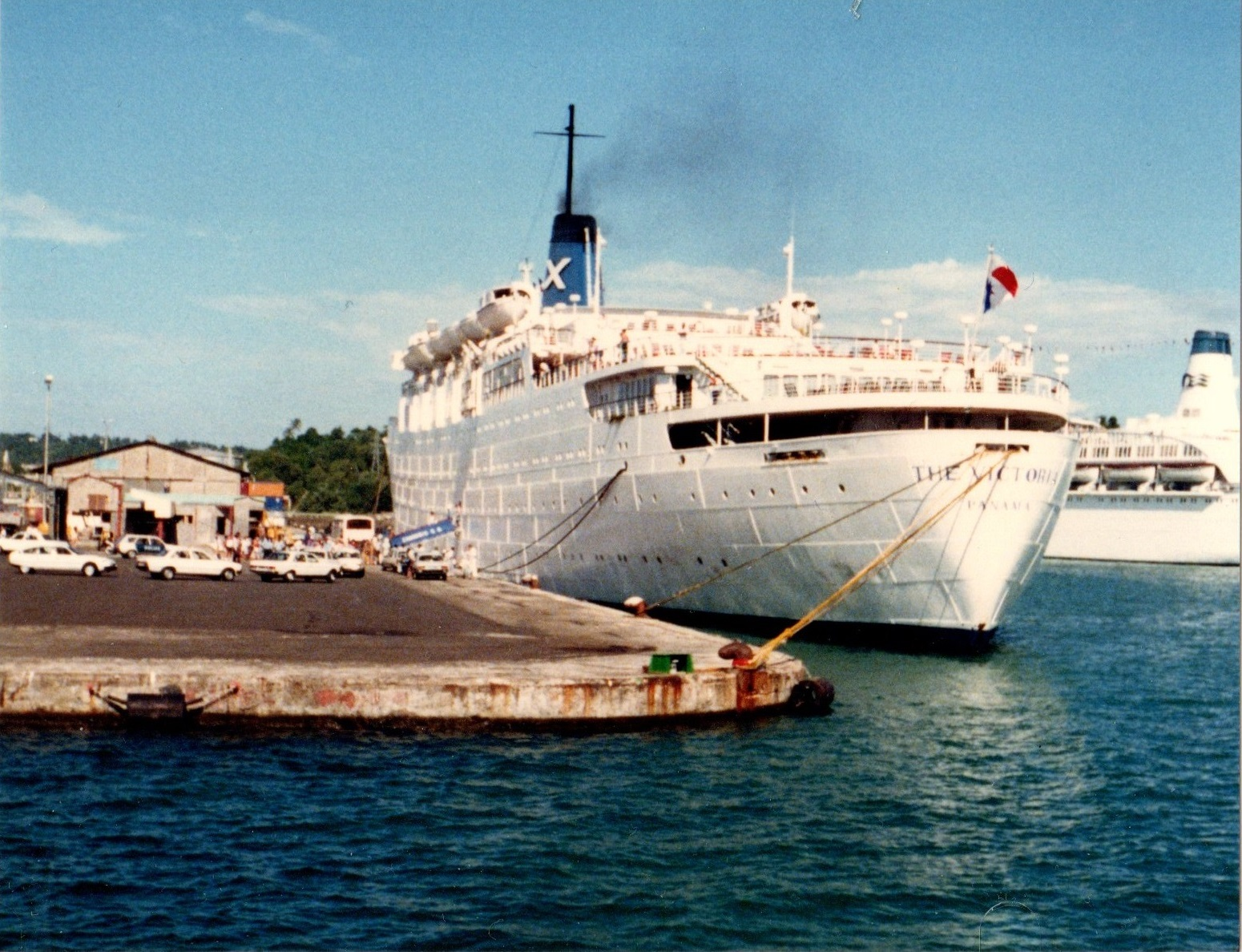
- The ship as The Victoria in 1985

History
- Name: Dunnottar Castle (1936–58); Victoria (1958–75); The Victoria (1976–93); Princesa Victoria (1993–2004)
- Namesake: Dunnottar Castle (1946–58)
- Owner: Union-Castle Mail SS Co Ltd (1936–58)
- Operator: Union-Castle Line (1936–39, 1942–58); Royal Navy (1939–42); Incres SS Co (1958–64); Clipper Line (1964–75); Chandris Lines (1975–93); Louis Cruise Lines (1993–2004)
- Port of registry: London (1936–58)
- Route: Tilbury – South Africa (1936–39, 1948–58)
- Builder: Harland and Wolff
- Yard number: 959
- Laid down: 1935
- Launched: 25 January 1936
- Completed: 27 June 1936
- Maiden voyage: July 1936
- Out of service: 2004
- Identification: UK official number 164637 (from 1936); Call sign GYVM (from 1936); IMO number: 5379717 (from 1969)
- Fate: Scrapped at Kumar Steel Breakers Yard in India, 2004

General characteristics
- Tonnage: as built: 15,007 GRT; tonnage under deck 11,585; 9,181 NRT
- Length: 540.0 ft (164.6 m)
- Beam: 71.9 ft (21.9 m)
- Draught: 28 ft 2 in (8.59 m)
- Depth: 37.8 ft (11.5 m)
- Decks: 3
- Installed power: 1,931 NHP
- Propulsion: twin screw, built with Burmeister & Wain 2-stroke diesel engines, replaced in 1959 with Fiat diesel engines
- Speed: 16 knots (30 km/h) as built, later 18 knots (33 km/h)
- Capacity: 285 first class, 250 tourist class as built, 696 single-class at the time of scrapping
- Crew: 250 as built
- Sensors & processing systems: direction finding equipment; echo sounding equipment; submarine signalling equipment
- Armament: as AMC: BL 6 inch Mk XII naval guns; QF 3-inch 20 cwt anti-aircraft guns
- Notes: sister ship: Dunvegan Castle

MS Dunnottar Castle was a British-built passenger ship with a career of more than six decades that included periods as an ocean liner, an armed merchant cruiser (AMC), a troop ship and several decades as a cruise ship. As a cruise ship she was renamed Victoria, then The Victoria and finally Princesa Victoria.

Harland and Wolff built Dunnottar Castle and her sister ship Dunvegan Castle in Belfast in 1936. Union-Castle Line operated Dunnottar Castle on scheduled services between Tilbury and South Africa until 1939, when the Admiralty requisitioned her and commissioned her as HMS Dunnottar Castle. From 1949 to 1958 she served again on Union-Castle's liner route between Britain and South Africa.

The ship's long career in cruising began in 1958 in the ownership of the Incres Steamship Company, who had her extensively remodelled and renamed her Victoria. Clipper Line bought her in 1964 and sold her in 1975 to Chandris Lines, who modified her name to The Victoria. In 1993 Louis Cruise Lines bought her and renamed her Princesa Victoria.

The ship was laid up from 2002 and scrapped in India in 2004.

== Building and pre-war service ==
In 1935 Union-Castle ordered a pair of 15,000 GRT "intermediate" passenger liners for its service between Britain and South Africa. Harland and Wolff laid down the two ships with the consecutive yard numbers 959 and 960.

Union-Castle policy was to name its ships after British castles. Hull 959 was launched on 25 January 1936, taking its name from Dunnottar Castle in Aberdeenshire. She was completed on 27 June 1936. Hull 960 was launched on 26 March, and was named after Dunvegan Castle on the Isle of Skye.

Dunnottar Castle was a motor ship with two-stroke marine diesel engines. They developed a total of 1,931 NHP and drove twin screws, giving her a speed of 16 knots (30 km/h). She had accommodation for 258 first class and 250 tourist class passengers. Except for her after hold, her cargo holds were refrigerated.

Dunnottar Castle began her maiden voyage from Southampton to Cape Town in July 1936. On her return she began her regular service between Tilbury and South Africa, and also as supply ship for Saint Helena.

== Armed merchant cruiser ==
At the outbreak of the Second World War the Admiralty requisitioned Dunnottar Castle, had her converted into an AMC and commissioned her as HMS Dunnottar Castle. BL 6 inch Mk XII naval guns were fitted as her primary armament. Her secondary armament included QF 3-inch 20 cwt anti-aircraft guns. She began her first patrol on 14 October 1939.

From December 1939 Dunnottar Castle escorted SL convoys from Freetown in Sierra Leone to Liverpool. Usually she returned to Freetown independently, but in June 1941 she took part in the escort of Convoy WS 9A from Oversay to Freetown and in August she took part in the escort of Convoy OS 3 from Belfast as far as Freetown. The last convoy she escorted was SL 110 in May and June 1942.

== Troop ship ==
In 1942 the Admiralty returned Dunnottar Castle to Union-Castle and the Ministry of War Transport had her refitted as a troop ship. In November 1942 she carried troops in Convoy KMF 2 to Algiers for Operation Torch, the Allied invasion of Vichy French North Africa. She returned to Britain in Convoy MKF 2 and then spent 11 days on the Clyde being repaired.

Dunnottar Castle continued on convoys between the Clyde and Algiers until July 1943. On 3 September 1943 Italy signed an armistice with the Allies and declared war on Germany. This made the Mediterranean less dangerous for Allied shipping. On 15 September Dunnottar Castle left Liverpool to join Convoy KMF 24, which took advantage of the armistice to reach the eastern Mediterranean. The ship reached Port Said in Egypt on 28 September. In Egypt she embarked Allied troops and joined Convoy XIF 2, which left Port Said on 6 October and reached Taranto in southern Italy on 9 October.

Dunnottar Castle returned to Britain via convoys IXF 2 and MKF 25, and then on November and December 1943 she sailed from the Clyde to Takoradi on the Gold Coast and Lagos in Nigeria via convoys KMF 26 and RS 12, and back to Egypt via convoys SR 8 and KMF 27, spending Christmas 1943 in Gibraltar and reaching Port Said on 30 December.

From Port Said Dunnottar Castle went to Bombay and back, calling at Suez on New Year's Day 1944, sailing in convoys AB 27A and BA 59 from Aden to Bombay and back and reaching Suez again on 8 February.

On 2 March 1944 Dunnottar Castle left Port Said for Liverpool with Convoy MKF 29, but on 9 March she detached at Gibraltar for repairs. She resumed her voyage with convoys MKS 42G and SL 151MK, reaching the Clyde on 22 March. She then spent eight weeks under repair on the Clyde and at Faslane.

On 15 June 1944 Dunnottar Castle left the Clyde to sail unescorted to Lagos and Takoradi. On 10 July she left Lagos for Egypt via convoys LTS 27, SR 15 and KMF 33, reaching Port Said on 31 July. In August she sailed from Suez to Bombay, joining Convoy AB 43 from Aden. After a week in Bombay she joined Convoy BM 100 to Colombo in Ceylon, and then continued unescorted to Australia and New Zealand. She called at Melbourne on 10–13 September, Wellington 17–30 September and then Fremantle 9–14 October 1944. She then returned to Egypt, reaching Suez on 4 November.

On 16 November 1944 Dunnottar Castle left Port Said for home waters, joining Convoy MKS 68G at Gibraltar which merged with Convoy SL 177 on the voyage home. She reached Belfast on 13 December 1944. She remained in home waters until 31 March 1945, when she reached Southampton. A fortnight later she was in Le Havre.

On 4 May Germany unconditionally surrendered, ending the war in Europe. On 25 June Dunnottar Castle left Southampton for Naples. She spent most of the rest of 1945 sailing between Britain and Mediterranean ports in Malta, Italy, Palestine and France, apart from one trip to Bergen in Norway in late August.

== Post-war passenger service ==
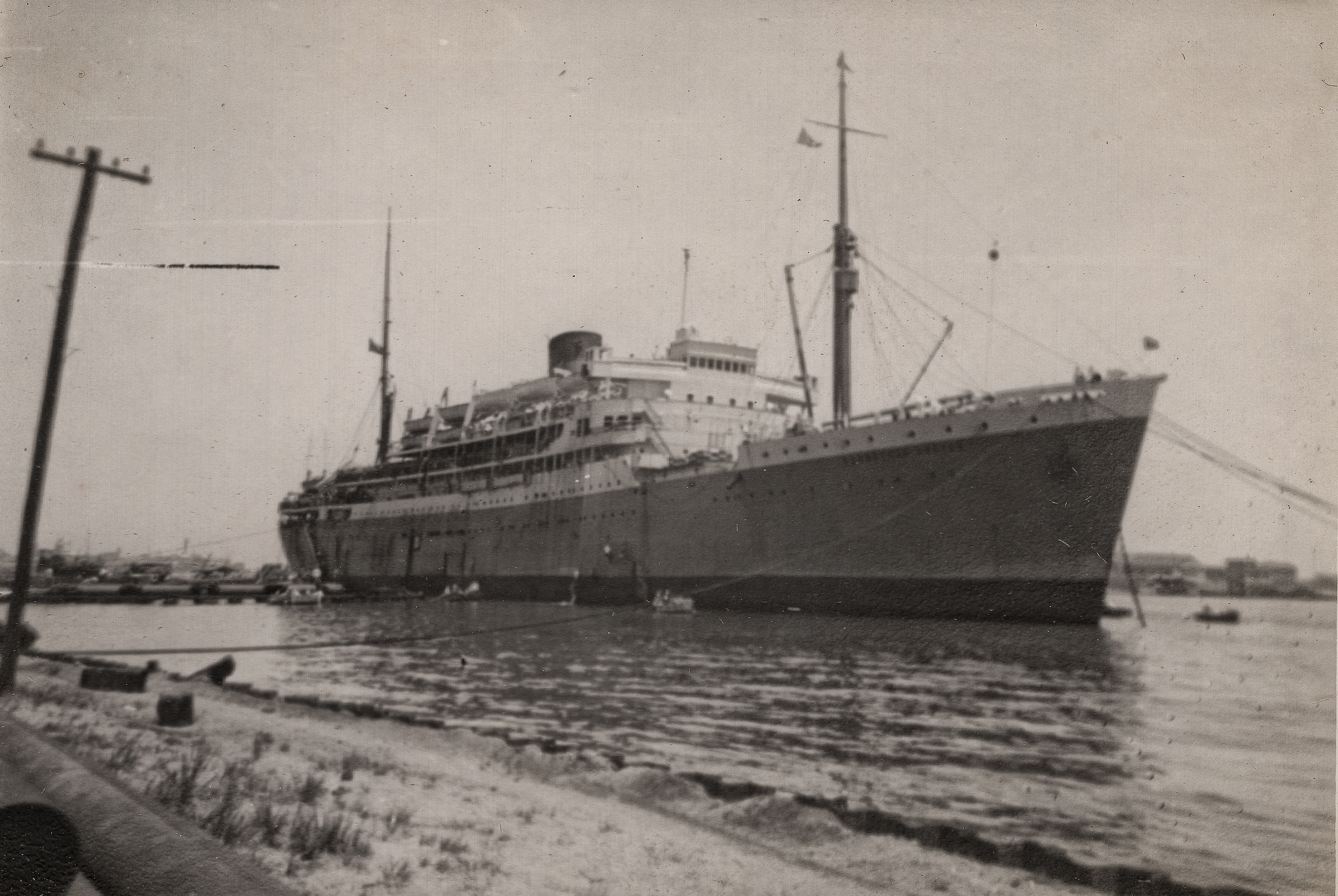
Dunnottar Castle in Egypt after World War II

Dunnottar Castle remained in UK Government service until 1948, when Union-Castle had her comprehensively overhauled. In 1949 she resumed her route between London and South Africa, but without her sister Dunvegan Castle, which had been sunk by the German submarine U-46 in 1942 during the Battle of the Atlantic.

Dunnottar Castle played a small part in the search for the coelacanth. The telegram from Captain Hunt to Dr J. L. B. Smith noting the discovery of the second coelacanth in the Comoros reached him when the ship stopped in Durban on 24 December 1952. All of his scientific equipment was deep in one of the holds of the ship.

Dunnottar Castle remained in liner service until Union-Castle sold her in 1958.

=== Cruise ship ===
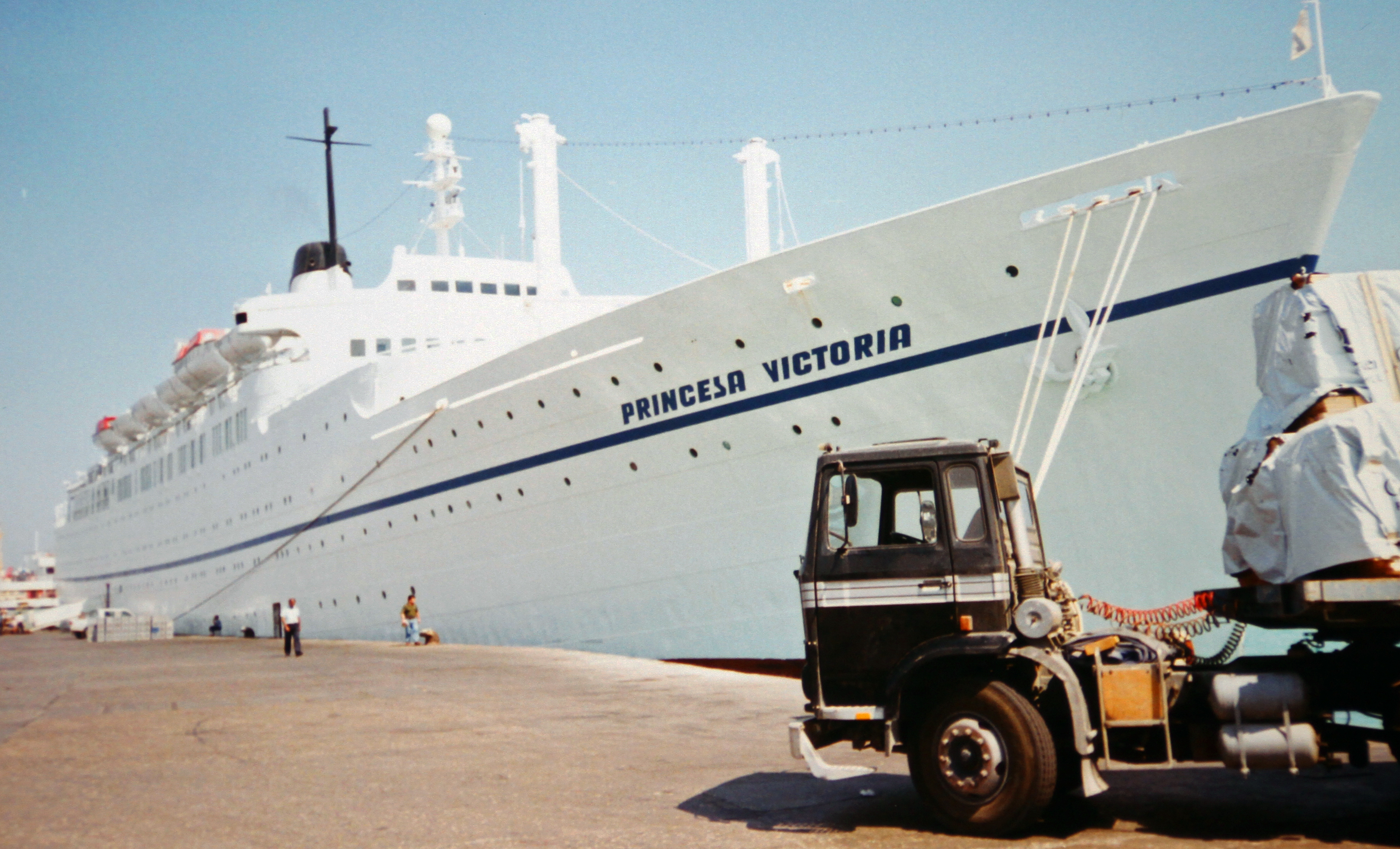
Princesa Victoria in Cyprus, 1994

Incres Steamship Co bought Dunnottar Castle and had her substantially remodelled as a cruise ship at the Wilton-Fijenoord shipyard near Rotterdam. She was given a new Fiat engine, new superstructure and a new raked bow. Her funnel was replaced with a streamlined modern one. Her two masts were removed and new derricks fitted. Her first and tourist class cabins were reconfigured as 600 single-class cabins with private facilities and air-conditioning. Incres renamed her Victoria and ran her from New York on cruises to the West Indies.

In 1964 she was sold to Victoria SS Co of Monrovia, a subsidiary of Swedish company Clipper Line of Malmö. She retained both her name and service. Incres Line continued as agents for the ship. For 11 years Victoria cruised from the United States to the Caribbean.

In 1975 Clipper Line sold her to Chandris Line, who modified her name to The Victoria. Chandris used her for Caribbean and European cruises until 1993, with a minor refurbishment in 1987 when Jade deck was created by converting storerooms into 38 passenger cabins. This was a major accomplishment as the ship was cruising with passengers aboard at the same time.

In 1993 Louis Cruise Lines bought the ship and renamed her Princesa Victoria. She made two and three-day cruises from Cyprus and spent the winters laid up in Perama. She served as a hotel ship in port for Expo '98 in Lisbon and for the G8 summit in Genoa in 2001.

=== Fate ===
Princesa Victoria was laid up from 2002. By then she was the oldest large liner still operating anywhere in the World. In 2004 she was scrapped at the Kumar Steel Breakers Yard in India.

== Bibliography ==
- Clymer, Eleanor (1965). Search for a Living Fossil: The Story of the Coelacanth. Cambridge: Luterworth Press.
- Harnack, Edwin P (1938) [1903]. All About Ships & Shipping (7th ed.). London: Faber and Faber. p. 590.
- McCluskie, Tom (2013). The Rise and Fall of Harland and Wolff. Stroud: The History Press. p. 144. ISBN 978-0752488615.
- Talbot-Booth, EC (1936). Ships and the Sea (Third ed.). London: Sampson Low, Marston & Co Ltd. p. 943.
