= German submarine U-751 =

German World War II submarine

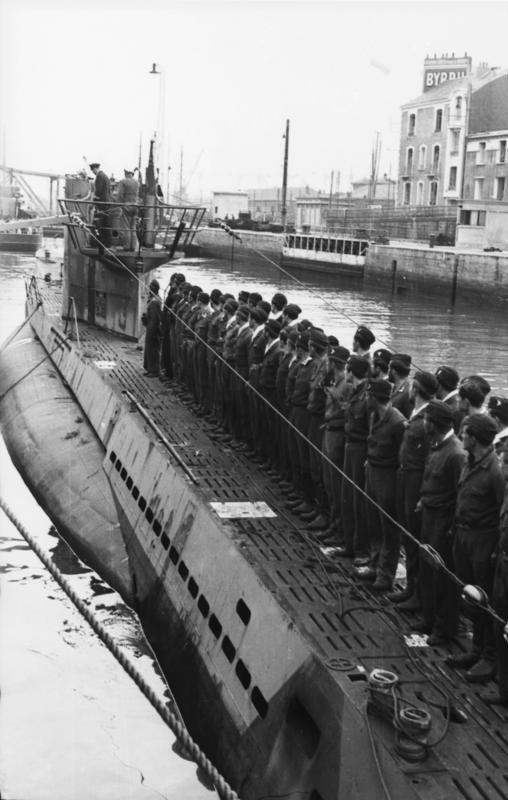
- In port at St. Nazaire on 15 June 1942

History

Nazi Germany
- Name: U-751
- Ordered: 9 October 1939
- Builder: Kriegsmarinewerft Wilhelmshaven
- Yard number: 134
- Laid down: 2 January 1940
- Launched: 16 November 1940
- Commissioned: 31 January 1941
- Fate: Sunk on 17 July 1942

General characteristics
- Class & type: Type VIIC submarine
- Displacement: 769 tonnes (757 long tons) surfaced; 871 t (857 long tons) submerged
- Length: 67.10 m (220 ft 2 in) o/a; 50.50 m (165 ft 8 in) pressure hull
- Beam: 6.20 m (20 ft 4 in) o/a; 4.70 m (15 ft 5 in) pressure hull
- Height: 9.60 m (31 ft 6 in)
- Draught: 4.74 m (15 ft 7 in)
- Installed power: 2,800–3,200 PS (2,100–2,400 kW; 2,800–3,200 bhp) (diesels); 750 PS (550 kW; 740 shp) (electric)
- Propulsion: 2 shafts; 2 × diesel engines; 2 × electric motors
- Speed: 17.7 knots (32.8 km/h; 20.4 mph) surfaced; 7.6 knots (14.1 km/h; 8.7 mph) submerged
- Range: 8,500 nmi (15,700 km; 9,800 mi) at 10 knots (19 km/h; 12 mph) surfaced; 80 nmi (150 km; 92 mi) at 4 knots (7.4 km/h; 4.6 mph) submerged
- Test depth: 230 m (750 ft); Crush depth: 250–295 m (820–968 ft)
- Complement: 4 officers, 40–56 enlisted
- Armament: 5 × 53.3 cm (21 in) torpedo tubes (four bow, one stern); 14 × torpedoes or 26 TMA mines; 1 × 8.8 cm (3.46 in) deck gun (220 rounds); 1 x 2 cm (0.79 in) C/30 AA gun

Service record
- Part of: 7th U-Boat Flotilla; 31 January 1941 – 17 July 1942
- Identification codes: M 30 807
- Commanders: Kptlt. Gerhard Bigalk; 31 January 1941 – 17 July 1942
- Operations: 7 patrols: 1st patrol: 3 June – 5 July 1941; 2nd patrol: 2 August – 8 September 1941; 3rd patrol: 11 October – 8 November 1941; 4th patrol: 16 – 26 December 1941; 5th patrol: 14 January – 23 February 1942; 6th patrol: 15 April – 15 June 1942; 7th patrol: 14 – 17 July 1942
- Victories: 5 merchant ships sunk (21,412 GRT); 1 warship sunk (11,000 tons); 1 merchant ship damaged (8,096 GRT)

German submarine U-751 was a Type VIIC U-boat built for Nazi Germany's Kriegsmarine for service during World War II. Built as yard number 134 of the Kriegsmarinewerft shipyard in Wilhelmshaven, she was commissioned on 31 January 1941. She served with 7th U-boat Flotilla until 1 June as a training boat, and as an operational boat until 17 July 1942, under the command of Kapitänleutnant Gerhard Bigalk. U-751 served in seven patrols with the 7th U-boat Flotilla, sinking the escort carrier HMS Audacity. The U-boat was attacked with depth charges from aircraft on 17 July 1942 and sank with the loss of all 48 crew members.

== Design ==
German Type VIIC submarines were preceded by the shorter Type VIIB submarines. U-751 had a displacement of 769 tonnes (757 long tons) when at the surface and 871 tonnes (857 long tons) while submerged. She had a total length of 67.10 m (220 ft 2 in), a pressure hull length of 50.50 m (165 ft 8 in), a beam of 6.20 m (20 ft 4 in), a height of 9.60 m (31 ft 6 in), and a draught of 4.74 m (15 ft 7 in). The submarine was powered by two Germaniawerft F46 four-stroke, six-cylinder supercharged diesel engines producing a total of 2,800 to 3,200 metric horsepower (2,060 to 2,350 kW; 2,760 to 3,160 shp) for use while surfaced, two Brown, Boveri & Cie GG UB 720/8 double-acting electric motors producing a total of 750 metric horsepower (550 kW; 740 shp) for use while submerged. She had two shafts and two 1.23 m (4 ft) propellers. The boat was capable of operating at depths of up to 230 metres (750 ft).

The submarine had a maximum surface speed of 17.7 knots (32.8 km/h; 20.4 mph) and a maximum submerged speed of 7.6 knots (14.1 km/h; 8.7 mph). When submerged, the boat could operate for 80 nautical miles (150 km; 92 mi) at 4 knots (7.4 km/h; 4.6 mph); when surfaced, she could travel 8,500 nautical miles (15,700 km; 9,800 mi) at 10 knots (19 km/h; 12 mph). U-751 was fitted with five 53.3 cm (21 in) torpedo tubes (four fitted at the bow and one at the stern), fourteen torpedoes, one 8.8 cm (3.46 in) SK C/35 naval gun, 220 rounds, and a 2 cm (0.79 in) C/30 anti-aircraft gun. The boat had a complement of between forty-four and sixty.

== Service history ==
On 14 June 1941, eleven days into her thirty-three-day first patrol while en route from Kiel to St. Nazaire, U-751 attacked and sank the British ship St Lindsay (5,370 gross register tons (GRT)).

Arriving at St. Nazaire on 5 July, U-751 stayed in port for thirty-four days before going on her second patrol. She attacked no ships on her second and third voyages.

Five days into her fourth patrol, on 21 December 1941, U-751 attacked and sank HMS Audacity, an escort carrier attached with British convoy HG 76.

On 14 January 1942, U-751 left St. Nazaire on her fifth patrol, destined to return on 23 February. Nineteen days into this patrol, on February 2, U-751 attacked and damaged the Dutch ship Corilla, part of convoy HX 173 (8,096 GRT). Two days later, she sank the British ship Silveray, adding another 4,535 GRT to her score. Another British ship, Empire Sun, was sunk another three days later, for 6,952 GRT. The American ships Nicarao and Isabela were sunk in her sixth patrol, on 16 and 19 May 1942, totalling 1,455 and 3,110 GRTs respectively.

=== Wolfpacks ===
U-751 took part in six wolfpacks, namely:

- West (16 – 20 June 1941)
- Hammer (5 – 12 August 1941)
- Grönland (12 – 27 August 1941)
- Bosemüller (28 August – 2 September 1941)
- Seewolf (2 – 5 September 1941)
- Reissewolf (21 – 31 October 1941)

== Fate ==
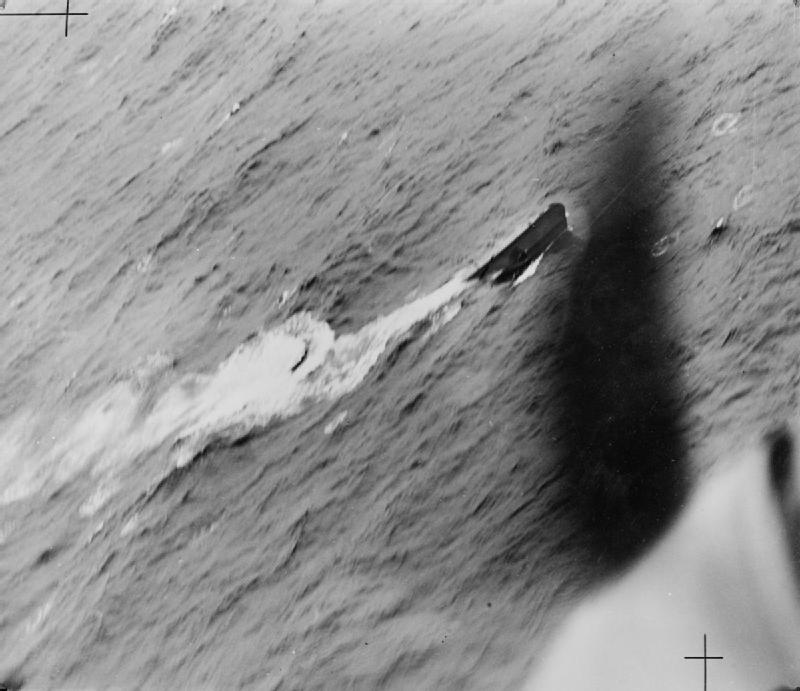
U-751 disabled, unable to dive and circling, apparently out of control following an attack on 17 July 1942.

After serving six operational patrols, U-751 was attacked on her seventh patrol four days into her voyage on 17 July 1942. After an initial attack by a Armstrong Whitworth Whitley bomber (of No. 502 Squadron RAF) had disabled her, she was attacked by a second aircraft, an Avro Lancaster bomber (of No. 61 Squadron RAF) seconded to Coastal Command. Both aircraft took photographs of U-751 on the surface, reporting men and lifeboats in the water. She was sunk by depth charges from the Lancaster, with all hands lost, in the Atlantic around 200 miles north-west of Cape Ortegal, Spain. (Note: different sources identify the exact location as either the Bay of Biscay, or just into the Atlantic Ocean itself)

== Summary of raiding history ==
Ships sunk (Note: Merchant ship tonnages are in gross register tons. Military vessels are listed by tons displacement.)
Date	Ship	Flag	GRT/ disp	Fate
14 June 1941	St. Lindsay	United Kingdom	5,370	Sunk
21 December 1941	HMS Audacity	Royal Navy	11,000	Sunk
2 February 1942	Corilla	Netherlands	8,096	Damaged
4 February 1942	Silveray	United Kingdom	4,535	Sunk
7 February 1942	Empire Sun	United Kingdom	6,952	Sunk
16 May 1942	Nicarao	United States	1,445	Sunk
19 May 1942	Isabela	United States	3,110	Sunk

== Bibliography ==
- Busch, Rainer; Röll, Hans-Joachim (1999). German U-boat commanders of World War II : a biographical dictionary. Translated by Brooks, Geoffrey. London, Annapolis, Md: Greenhill Books, Naval Institute Press. ISBN 1-55750-186-6.
- Busch, Rainer; Röll, Hans-Joachim (1999). Deutsche U-Boot-Verluste von September 1939 bis Mai 1945 [German U-boat losses from September 1939 to May 1945]. Der U-Boot-Krieg (in German). Vol. IV. Hamburg, Berlin, Bonn: Mittler. ISBN 3-8132-0514-2.
- Gröner, Erich; Jung, Dieter; Maass, Martin (1991). U-boats and Mine Warfare Vessels. German Warships 1815–1945. Vol. 2. Translated by Thomas, Keith; Magowan, Rachel. London: Conway Maritime Press. ISBN 0-85177-593-4.
