= German submarine U-567 =

German World War II submarine

History

Nazi Germany
- Name: U-567
- Ordered: 24 October 1939
- Builder: Blohm & Voss, Hamburg
- Yard number: 543
- Laid down: 27 April 1940
- Launched: 6 March 1941
- Commissioned: 24 April 1941
- Fate: Sunk on 21 December 1941

General characteristics
- Class & type: Type VIIC submarine
- Displacement: 769 tonnes (757 long tons) surfaced; 871 t (857 long tons) submerged
- Length: 67.10 m (220 ft 2 in) o/a; 50.50 m (165 ft 8 in) pressure hull
- Beam: 6.20 m (20 ft 4 in) o/a; 4.70 m (15 ft 5 in) pressure hull
- Height: 9.60 m (31 ft 6 in)
- Draught: 4.74 m (15 ft 7 in)
- Installed power: 2,800–3,200 PS (2,100–2,400 kW; 2,800–3,200 bhp) (diesels); 750 PS (550 kW; 740 shp) (electric)
- Propulsion: 2 shafts; 2 × diesel engines; 2 × electric motors
- Speed: 17.7 knots (32.8 km/h; 20.4 mph) surfaced; 7.6 knots (14.1 km/h; 8.7 mph) submerged
- Range: 8,500 nmi (15,700 km; 9,800 mi) at 10 knots (19 km/h; 12 mph) surfaced; 80 nmi (150 km; 92 mi) at 4 knots (7.4 km/h; 4.6 mph) submerged
- Test depth: 230 m (750 ft); Crush depth: 250–295 m (820–968 ft)
- Complement: 4 officers, 40–56 enlisted
- Armament: 5 × 53.3 cm (21 in) torpedo tubes (four bow, one stern); 14 × torpedoes or 26 TMA mines; 1 × 8.8 cm (3.46 in) deck gun (220 rounds); 1 x 2 cm (0.79 in) C/30 AA gun

Service record
- Part of: 3rd U-boat Flotilla; 24 April – 31 October 1941; 7th U-boat Flotilla; 1 November – 21 December 1941
- Identification codes: M 42 135
- Commanders: Kptlt. Theodor Fahr; 24 April – 14 October 1941; Kptlt. Engelbert Endrass; 15 October – 21 December 1941
- Operations: 3 patrols: 1st patrol: 5 August – 12 September 1941; 2nd patrol: 25 October – 26 November 1941; 3rd patrol: 18 – 21 December 1941
- Victories: 2 merchant ships sunk (6,809 GRT)

U 570, a Type VIIC submarine

German submarine U-567 was a type VII C submarine in Nazi Germany's Kriegsmarine during the Second World War.

Her keel was laid down on 27 April 1940 at the Blohm & Voss yard in Hamburg as yard number 543. She was launched on 6 March 1941 and was commissioned on 24 April under Kapitänleutnant Theodor Fahr. She entered service with the 3rd U-boat Flotilla for training. She began operations with that flotilla on 1 August 1941 and joined the 7th Flotilla on 1 November.

The U-boat was sunk with the loss of all crew on 21 December 1941.

== Design ==
German Type VIIC submarines were preceded by the shorter Type VIIB submarines. U-567 had a displacement of 769 tonnes (757 long tons) when at the surface and 871 tonnes (857 long tons) while submerged. She had a total length of 67.10 m (220 ft 2 in), a pressure hull length of 50.50 m (165 ft 8 in), a beam of 6.20 m (20 ft 4 in), a height of 9.60 m (31 ft 6 in), and a draught of 4.74 m (15 ft 7 in). The submarine was powered by two Germaniawerft F46 four-stroke, six-cylinder supercharged diesel engines producing a total of 2,800 to 3,200 metric horsepower (2,060 to 2,350 kW; 2,760 to 3,160 shp) for use while surfaced, two Brown, Boveri & Cie GG UB 720/8 double-acting electric motors producing a total of 750 metric horsepower (550 kW; 740 shp) for use while submerged. She had two shafts and two 1.23 m (4 ft) propellers. The boat was capable of operating at depths of up to 230 metres (750 ft).

The submarine had a maximum surface speed of 17.7 knots (32.8 km/h; 20.4 mph) and a maximum submerged speed of 7.6 knots (14.1 km/h; 8.7 mph). When submerged, the boat could operate for 80 nautical miles (150 km; 92 mi) at 4 knots (7.4 km/h; 4.6 mph); when surfaced, she could travel 8,500 nautical miles (15,700 km; 9,800 mi) at 10 knots (19 km/h; 12 mph). U-567 was fitted with five 53.3 cm (21 in) torpedo tubes (four fitted at the bow and one at the stern), fourteen torpedoes, one 8.8 cm (3.46 in) SK C/35 naval gun, 220 rounds, and a 2 cm (0.79 in) C/30 anti-aircraft gun. The boat had a complement of between forty-four and sixty.

== Service history ==
=== First patrol ===
She left Trondheim in Norway on 5 August 1941 and entered the Atlantic via the gap between Iceland and the Faroe Islands, sinking the 3,485 GRT British merchant ship Fort Richepanse west of Ireland on 3 September. She docked at St. Nazaire in occupied France on 12 September.

=== Second patrol ===
The boat switched captains to Kapitänleutnant Engelbert Endrass, (who had been IWO [first watch officer] on Günther Prien's U-47 when she sank the battleship HMS Royal Oak in 1939), on 15 October. The boat left St. Nazaire on 25 October 1941 and returned on 26 November. The patrol was unsuccessful.

=== Third patrol and loss ===
She attacked convoy HG 76 in the North Atlantic, north-east of the Azores, which was made up of 32 cargo ships and escorted by five destroyers, seven corvettes and one aircraft carrier, sinking the 3,324 GRT Norwegian merchant ship Annavore on 21 December 1941. U-567 was herself sunk later the same day at 44°02′N 20°10′W by depth charges dropped by HMS Deptford and Samphire - there were no survivors from her crew of 47.

=== Wolfpacks ===
U-567 took part in five wolfpacks, namely:

- Grönland (10 – 23 August 1941)
- Kurfürst (23 August – 2 September 1941)
- Seewolf (2 – 9 September 1941)
- Stosstrupp (30 October – 4 November 1941)
- Störtebecker (15 – 24 November 1941)

== Summary of raiding history ==
Date	Ship Name	Nationality	Tonnage (GRT)	Fate
3 September 1941	Fort Richepanse	United Kingdom	3,485	Sunk
21 December 1941	Annavore	Norway	3,324	Sunk

== Bibliography ==
- Busch, Rainer; Röll, Hans-Joachim (1999). German U-boat commanders of World War II : a biographical dictionary. Translated by Brooks, Geoffrey. London, Annapolis, Md: Greenhill Books, Naval Institute Press. ISBN 1-55750-186-6.
- Busch, Rainer; Röll, Hans-Joachim (1999). Der U-Boot-Krieg, 1939-1945: Deutsche U-Boot-Verluste von September 1939 bis Mai 1945 [German U-boat losses from September 1939 to May 1945] (in German). Vol. IV. Hamburg, Berlin, Bonn: Mittler. ISBN 3-8132-0514-2.
- Gröner, Eric; Jung, Dieter; Maass, Martin (1991). German Warships 1815-1945: U-boats and Mine Warfare Vessels. Vol. 2. Translated by Thomas, Keith; Magowan, Rachel. London: Conway Maritime Press. ISBN 0-85177-593-4.
- Kemp, Paul (1997). U-Boats Destroyed - German Submarine Losses in the World Wars. Arms & Armour. ISBN 1-85409-515-3.
