= German submarine U-127 =

U-127 may refer to one of the following German submarines:

- SM U-127, the lead ship of the Type U 127 submarines; laid down during the First World War; unfinished at the end of the war; broken up incomplete, 1919–20
  - During the First World War, Germany also had this submarine with a similar name:
    - SM UB-127, a Type UB III submarine launched in 1918 and sunk in September 1918
- German submarine U-127 (1941), a Type IXC submarine that served in the Second World War until sunk on 15 December 1941
