= HMS Primrose (K91) =

HMS Primrose (K91) was a Flower-class corvette that served in the Royal Navy during the Second World War.

== Construction and career ==
The ship was ordered on 31 August 1939 from W. Simons and Company of Renfrew. The keel was laid on 22 September 1939. The ship was launched on 8 May 1940 and completed on 15 July.

During the war, the ship was assigned to convoy duty.

On 28 August 1940, the ship, along with HMS Harvester rescued some 250 survivors from HMS Dunvegan Castle which sank following torpedo attack.

In January 1942, during Warship Week the ship was adopted by the Welsh settlements of Risca and Crosskeys.

In August 1942, the ship rescued 7 survivors from the steam vessel 'Anneberg' which had been sunk by U-379.

The ship was sold in 1946, converted to a whaling ship (the 'Norfinn') and then scrapped in 1966.
