= HMS Dunvegan Castle =

Cruiser of the Royal Navy

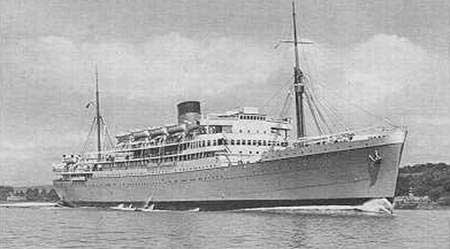
- Dunvegan Castle in civilian service

History

United Kingdom
- Name: Dunvegan Castle
- Namesake: Dunvegan Castle
- Owner: Union-Castle Mail SS Co Ltd
- Operator: Union-Castle Line (1936–39); Royal Navy (1939–40)
- Port of registry: London
- Route: Tilbury – South Africa (1936–39)
- Builder: Harland and Wolff
- Yard number: 960
- Launched: 26 March 1936
- Completed: 18 August 1936
- Maiden voyage: 18 September 1936
- In service: 1936
- Out of service: 1940
- Identification: UK official number 164702; Call sign GYXG
- Fate: Torpedoed on 27 August 1940; sank 28 August 1940

General characteristics
- Tonnage: 15,007 GRT; tonnage under deck 11,585; 9,174 NRT
- Length: 540.0 ft (164.6 m)
- Beam: 71.9 ft (21.9 m)
- Draught: 28 ft 2 in (8.59 m)
- Depth: 37.8 ft (11.5 m)
- Decks: 3
- Installed power: 1,931 NHP
- Propulsion: 2-stroke diesel
- Speed: 16 knots (30 km/h)
- Capacity: 258 1st class and 250 tourist class passengers (1936–39)
- Sensors & processing systems: direction finding equipment; echo sounding equipment; submarine signalling equipment
- Armament: as AMC: BL 6 inch Mk XII naval guns; QF 3 inch 20 cwt anti-aircraft guns
- Notes: sister ship: Dunnottar Castle

HMS Dunvegan Castle was a UK ocean liner that was converted into an armed merchant cruiser (AMC) in the Second World War. Harland and Wolff built her and her sister ship Dunnottar Castle in Belfast in 1936.

Union-Castle Line operated Dunvegan Castle on scheduled service between Southampton and South Africa until 1939. When war broke out she was requisitioned by the Admiralty and commissioned as HMS Dunvegan Castle.

She escorted Allied convoys from Sierra Leone to Britain from January 1940. In August 1940, she was torpedoed and sunk by the German submarine U-46 in the Western Approaches, killing 27 of her crew. The vessel's commander and 249 of his crew were resuced.

== Building and civilian service ==
In 1935 Union-Castle ordered a pair of 15,000 GRT "intermediate" passenger liners for its service between Tilbury and South Africa. Harland and Wolff laid down the two ships with the consecutive yard numbers 959 and 960.

Union-Castle policy was to name its ships after British castles. Hull 959 was launched on 25 January 1936, taking its name from Dunnottar Castle in Aberdeenshire. Hull 960 was launched on 26 March, taking its name from Dunvegan Castle on the Isle of Skye. She was completed on 18 August 1936. She was the scene of an attempted murder in August 1937, when Antonio Mifsud, a Maltese kitchen porter, stabbed the former cricketer Ernest Hayter.

Dunvegan Castle was a motor ship with two-stroke marine diesel engines. They developed a total of 1,931 NHP and drove twin screws, giving her a speed of 16 knots (30 km/h). She had accommodation for 258 first class and 250 tourist class passengers. Except for her after hold, her cargo holds were refrigerated.

Dunvegan Castle began her maiden voyage on 18 September 1936. It was a circuit of Africa including passage through the Suez Canal. She then settled down to scheduled services between Southampton and ports in South Africa.

== Armed merchant cruiser ==
On 3 September 1939, the day the UK entered the Second World War, Dunvegan Castle was in East London in South Africa. The Admiralty requisitioned her there and sent her to the UK to be converted into an AMC. She called at Cape Town, and then at Freetown in Sierra Leone where she joined Convoy SL 2F to be escorted to home waters.

Dunvegan Castle was back in Belfast from 16 to 25 December to be converted into an AMC. BL 6 inch Mk XII naval guns were fitted as her primary armament. Her secondary armament included QF 3 inch 20 cwt anti-aircraft guns.

Dunvegan Castle left Belfast on Christmas Day 1939. In January 1940 she briefly visited the Royal Navy bases at Portland Harbour, Portsmouth and HMNB Devonport. On 17 January she reached Autonomous Port of Dakar in French Senegal. The first convoy she escorted was SL 18F, a "fast" convoy that left Freetown on 28 January. On 8 February SL 18F joined the main part of Convoy SL 18 and Dunvegan Castle detached to return independently to Dakar. The ship next escorted Convoy SL 22, which left Freetown on 27 February and joined SL 22F on 11 March. Again Dunvegan Castle detached to patrol and then return to Dakar.

For subsequent SL convoys Dunvegan Castle was an escort all the way to UK home waters. She was an escort of Convoy SL 26, which left Freetown on 30 March and reached Liverpool on 15 April. Then she was in Belfast from 14 April to 2 May. From May to July 1940 Dunvegan Castle escorted convoys SL 32, SL 36 and SL 39 from Freetown to Liverpool.

Dunvegan Castle's final visit to Dakar was on 8–10 June, between escorting convoys SL 32 and SL 36. France capitulated on 22 June, when Dunvegan Castle was escorting Convoy SL 36 to Liverpool, so when she returned to West Africa she went straight to Freetown to await Convoy SL 39.

=== Final voyage and loss ===
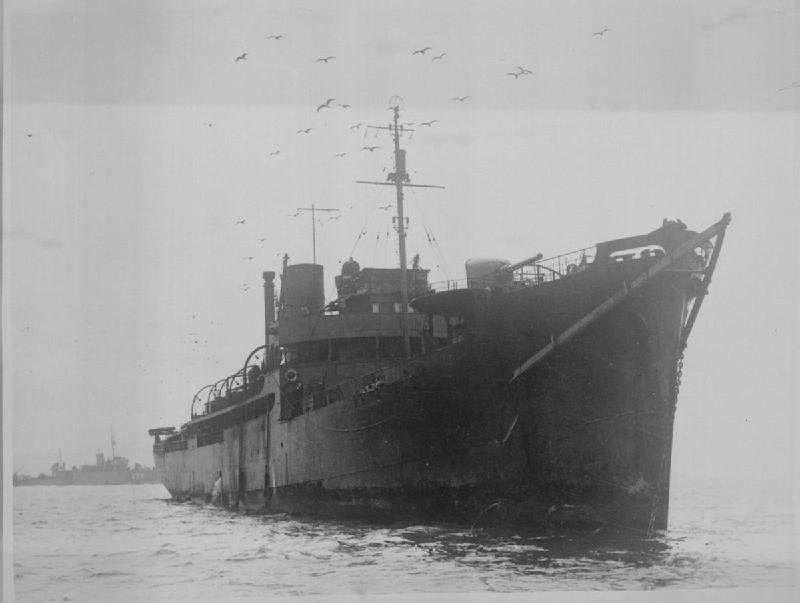
HMS Corinthian, an Ellerman Lines cargo ship that had been converted into an ocean boarding vessel

Dunvegan Castle's final voyage was with Convoy SL 43, which left Freetown on 11 August 1940. It included 45 merchant ships, but for its first fortnight at sea it had only three escorts: Dunvegan Castle, the sloop HMS Milford and the Ellerman Lines cargo steamship Corinthian, which had been converted into an ocean boarding vessel.

In the Western Approaches, SL 43 was reinforced by the sloop HMS Fowey and corvette Periwinkle on 26 August, and the destroyer HMS Winchelsea and corvette Primrose on 27 August. On the evening of 27 August, U-46 attacked Dunvegan Castle. She was about 120 miles southwest of Cape Clear Island in southwest Ireland when the first torpedo struck her aft of her bridge at 2147 hrs. Dunvegan Castle kept under way, steaming north. At 2212 hrs U-46 torpedoed her again, hitting her in the engine room. At 2231 hrs a second u-boat, U-37, attacked the convoy, torpedoing and sinking the Greek merchant steamship Theodoros T.

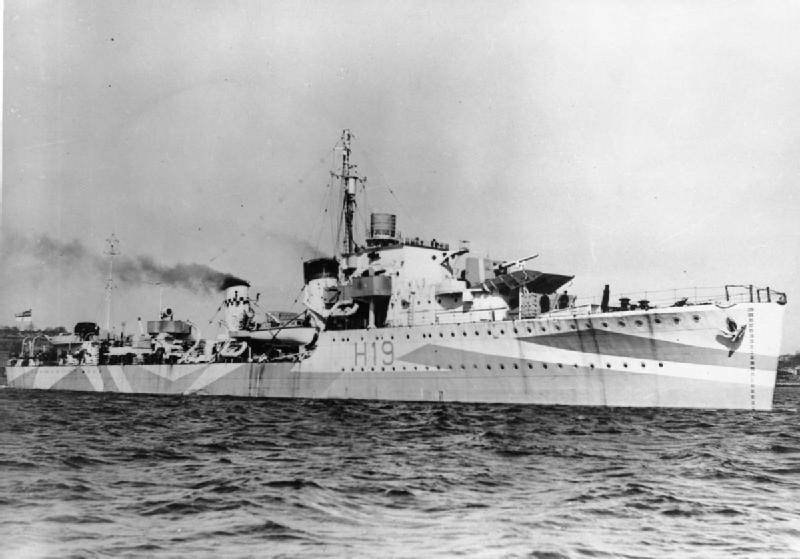
The destroyer HMS Harvester, which with the corvette Primrose rescued 250 survivors from Dunevegan Castle

At 2251 hrs U-46 torpedoed Dunvegan Castle a third time, hitting her just forward of her bridge. Dunvegan Castle caught fire and stopped. By now she was northwest of Erris Head in the west of Ireland. Three officers and 24 ratings were killed. The destroyer HMS Harvester and one of the convoy escorts, the corvette Primrose, rescued Dunvegan Castle's commander and 249 of his crew. Dunvegan Castle sank the next day at 55°05′N 11°00′W.

== Bibliography ==
- Harnack, Edwin P (1938) [1903]. All About Ships & Shipping (7th ed.). London: Faber and Faber. p. 590.
- Talbot-Booth, EC (1936). Ships and the Sea (Third ed.). London: Sampson Low, Marston & Co Ltd. p. 943.
- Woodman, Richard (2011). The Real Cruel Sea: The Merchant Navy in the Battle of the Atlantic 1939–1943. Barnsley: Pen and Sword. ISBN 978-1844689750.
