= German submarine U-46 (1938) =

German World War II submarine

Coordinates: 54°50′N 9°29′E

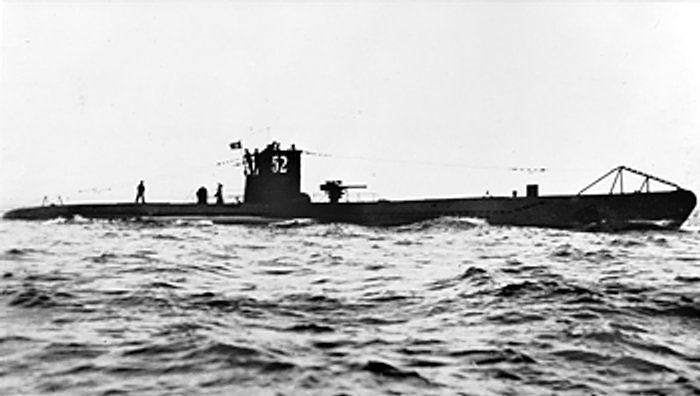
- U-52, a typical Type VIIB boat

History

Nazi Germany
- Name: U-46
- Ordered: 21 November 1936
- Builder: Germaniawerft, Kiel
- Cost: 4,439,000 Reichsmark
- Yard number: 581
- Laid down: 24 February 1937
- Launched: 10 September 1938
- Commissioned: 2 November 1938
- Decommissioned: October 1943
- Fate: Scuttled on 5 May 1945

General characteristics
- Class & type: Type VIIB U-boat
- Displacement: 753 t (741 long tons) surfaced; 857 t (843 long tons) submerged
- Length: 66.50 m (218 ft 2 in) o/a; 48.80 m (160 ft 1 in) pressure hull
- Beam: 6.20 m (20 ft 4 in) o/a; 4.70 m (15 ft 5 in) pressure hull
- Draught: 4.74 m (15 ft 7 in)
- Propulsion: 2 × supercharged diesel engines totalling 2,800–3,200 PS (2,100–2,400 kW; 2,800–3,200 bhp) surfaced; 2 × electric engines totalling 750 PS (550 kW; 740 shp) submerged
- Speed: 17.9 knots (33.2 km/h; 20.6 mph); 8 knots (15 km/h; 9.2 mph)
- Range: 8,700 nmi (16,112 km; 10,012 mi) at 10 knots (19 km/h; 12 mph)surfaced; 90 nmi (170 km; 100 mi) at 4 knots (7.4 km/h; 4.6 mph)
- Test depth: 230 m (750 ft); Calculated crush depth: 250–295 m (820–968 ft)
- Complement: 4 officers, 40–56 enlisted
- Sensors & processing systems: Gruppenhorchgerät
- Armament: 5 × 53.3 cm (21 in) torpedo tubes (four bow, one stern); 14 torpedoes or 26 TMA or 39 TMB mines; 1 × 8.8 cm SK C/35 naval gun with 220 rounds; 1 × 2 cm (0.79 in) C/30 anti-aircraft gun

Service record
- Part of: 7th U-boat Flotilla; 2 November 1938 – 1 September 1941; 26th U-boat Flotilla; 2 September 1941 – 31 March 1942; 24th U-boat Flotilla; 1 April – 1 July 1942; 1 September 1942 – October 1943
- Identification codes: M 01 828
- Commanders: Kptlt. Herbert Sohler; 2 November 1938 – 21 May 1940; Oblt.z.S. / Kptlt. Engelbert Endrass; 22 May 1940 – 24 September 1941; Oblt.z.S. Peter-Ottmar Grau; October – 19 November 1941; Oblt.z.S. Konstantin von Puttkamer; 20 November 1941 – March 1942; Oblt.z.S. Kurt Neubert; March – April 1942; Oblt.z.S. Ernst von Witzendorff; 20 April – May 1942; Lt.z.S. Franz Saar; May – July 1942; Oblt.z.S. Joachim Knecht; August 1942 – 30 April 1943; Oblt.z.S. Erich Jewinski; 1 May – October 1943
- Operations: 13 patrols: 1st patrol: 19 August – 15 September 1939; 2nd patrol: 3 October – 7 November 1939; 3rd patrol: 19 December 1939 – 10 January 1940; 4th patrol: 29 February – 1 March 1940; 5th patrol: 11 March – 23 April 1940; 6th patrol: a. 1 June – 1 July 1940; b. 1 – 4 Aug 1940; 7th patrol: a. 8 August – 6 September 1940; b. 20 – 21 September 1940; 8th patrol: 23 – 29 September 1940; 9th patrol: 13 – 29 October 1940; 10th patrol: 12 February – 4 March 1941; 11th patrol: 15 March – 10 April 1941; 12th patrol: 15 May – 13 June 1941; 13th patrol: 26 July – 26 August 1941
- Victories: 20 merchant ships sunk (85,792 GRT); 2 auxiliary warships sunk (35,284 GRT); 1 merchant ship total loss (2,080 GRT); 4 merchant ships damaged (25,491 GRT)

German submarine U-46 was a Type VIIB U-boat of Nazi Germany's Kriegsmarine during World War II. She had a highly successful career during the war.

== Design ==
German Type VIIB submarines were preceded by the shorter Type VIIA submarines. U-46 had a displacement of 753 tonnes (741 long tons) when at the surface and 857 tonnes (843 long tons) while submerged. She had a total length of 66.50 m (218 ft 2 in), a pressure hull length of 48.80 m (160 ft 1 in), a beam of 6.20 m (20 ft 4 in), a height of 9.50 m (31 ft 2 in), and a draught of 4.74 m (15 ft 7 in). The submarine was powered by two Germaniawerft F46 four-stroke, six-cylinder supercharged diesel engines producing a total of 2,800 to 3,200 metric horsepower (2,060 to 2,350 kW; 2,760 to 3,160 shp) for use while surfaced, two BBC GG UB 720/8 double-acting electric motors producing a total of 750 metric horsepower (550 kW; 740 shp) for use while submerged. She had two shafts and two 1.23 m (4 ft) propellers. The boat was capable of operating at depths of up to 230 metres (750 ft).

The submarine had a maximum surface speed of 17.9 knots (33.2 km/h; 20.6 mph) and a maximum submerged speed of 8 knots (15 km/h; 9.2 mph). When submerged, the boat could operate for 90 nautical miles (170 km; 100 mi) at 4 knots (7.4 km/h; 4.6 mph); when surfaced, she could travel 8,700 nautical miles (16,100 km; 10,000 mi) at 10 knots (19 km/h; 12 mph). U-46 was fitted with five 53.3 cm (21 in) torpedo tubes (four fitted at the bow and one at the stern), fourteen torpedoes, one 8.8 cm (3.46 in) SK C/35 naval gun, 220 rounds, and an anti-aircraft gun. The boat had a complement of between forty-four and sixty.

== Service history ==
U-46 was ordered on 21 November 1936 and laid down on 24 February 1937 at Friedrich Krupp Germaniawerft, Kiel, becoming yard number 581. She was launched on 10 September 1938 and commissioned under her first commander, Kapitänleutnant (Kptlt.) Herbert Sohler, on 2 November of that year. Sohler commanded her during her working up with the 7th U-boat Flotilla, she then became a front boat with that flotilla. She set out from Kiel on her first war patrol on 19 August 1939 in the North Sea, returning on 15 September.

=== Sohler replaced by Endrass ===
On 13 April 1940 during the battles around Narvik, Norway U-46 was depth charged and severely damaged by British destroyers supporting HMS Warspite. Sohler eventually commanded U-46 for six war patrols, but failed to score any successes against enemy shipping. He was removed from command on 21 May 1940 and was replaced by Engelbert Endrass the following day. Endrass had been Günther Prien's First Officer aboard U-47 when they had infiltrated Scapa Flow and sunk the battleship HMS Royal Oak. U-46 was to be his first command.

=== Initial successes ===
Endrass left Kiel on 1 June to patrol the North Sea and into the Atlantic. He was immediately successful, on 6 June U-46 scored her first kill, the armed merchant cruiser Carinthia. Endrass followed this up with the Finnish merchant ship SS Margareta on 9 June. On 11 June he damaged MV Athelprince; the following day he sank SS Barbara Marie and SS Willowbank. His final kill was the Greek SS Elpis on 17 June. U-46 returned to Kiel on 1 July after 31 days at sea, during which five ships had been sunk for 35,347 tons and another for 8,782 tons, had been damaged.

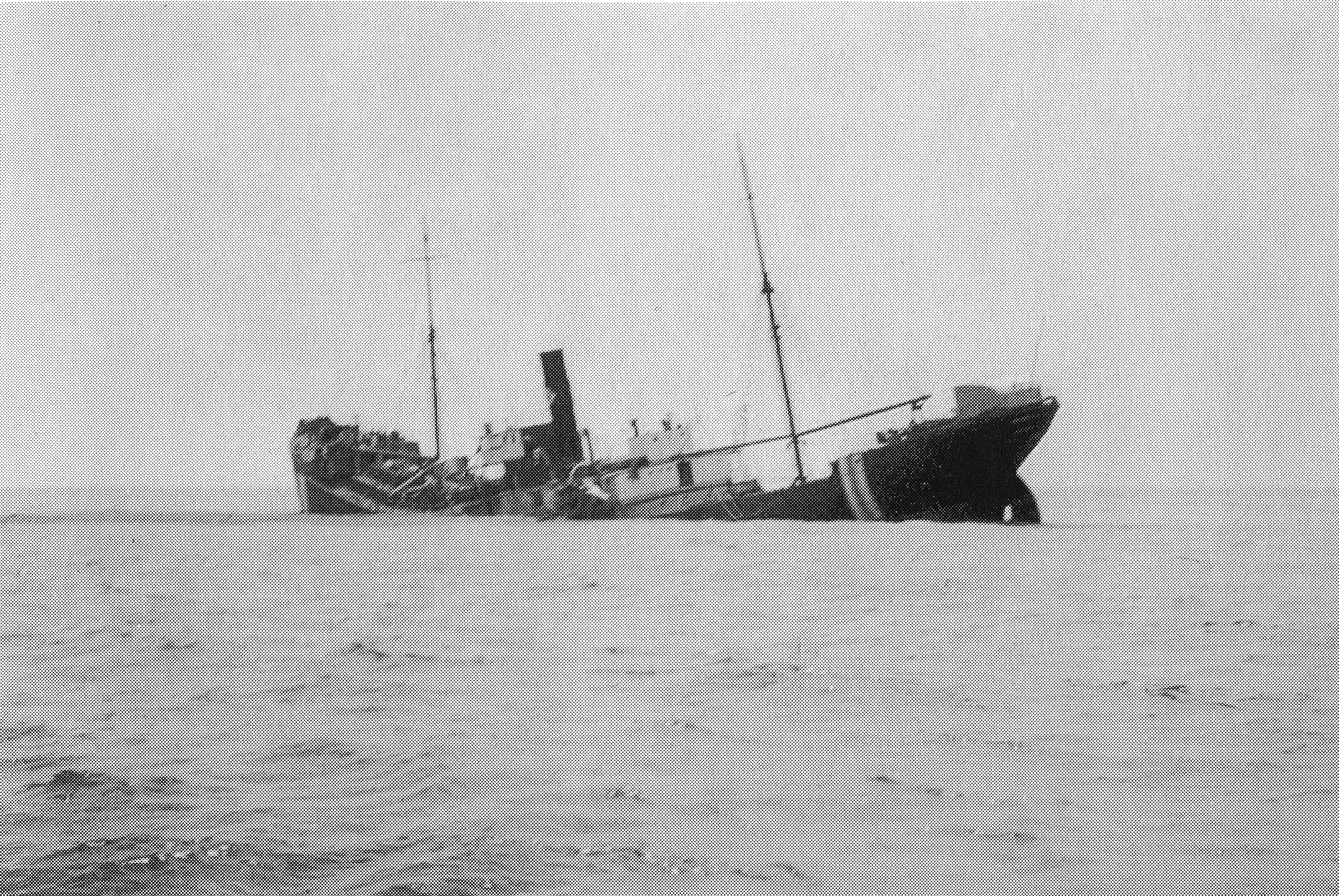
SS Margareta

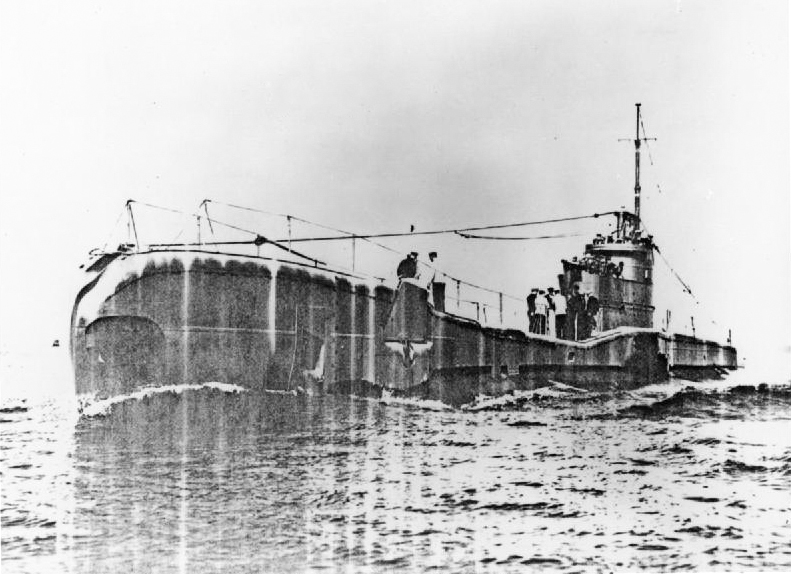
HMS Triad

U-46 relocated to Bergen in August. On 3 August she was spotted by the British submarine HMS Triad. Triad surfaced and attacked U-46 with her 102mm gun at 2230 hours. Endrass dived, pursued by Triad but the two submarines subsequently lost contact. U-46 sailed again on 8 August. It was another highly successful patrol. On 16 August she damaged the Dutch ship SS Alcinous and on 20 August torpedoed the Greek vessel SS Leonidas M. Valmas. The ship was declared a total loss. On 27 August U-46 sank the armed merchant cruiser HMS Dunvegan Castle, followed by SS Ville de Hasselt on 31 August, SS Thornlea on 2 September and SS Luimneach, an Irish steamship sailing under a neutral flag, on 4 September.

There are differences in the accounts given by the captains. Endrass claimed that Captain Eric Jones and his crew "lost their heads completely" at the shot across the bows from his U-boat. Jones was an experienced captain. The Luimneach had survived twelve aerial attacks during the Spanish Civil War. The crew of Luimneach abandoned ship and Endrass sank her with gunfire, as he had no torpedoes remaining. Following an inquiry on 4 March 1941, Dönitz concluded that the U-boat acted correctly in sinking an abandoned ship. U-46 returned to Lorient on the French Atlantic coast on 6 September, having sunk five ships for 29,883 tons and damaged another for 6,189 tons.

=== Convoy interception ===
Her next patrol from Saint Nazaire (also in France), only lasted seven days but claimed two ships sunk on 26 September, SS Coast Wings and SS Siljan for a combined total of 3,920 tons. U-46 sailed again on 13 October. During this patrol she was involved in wolfpack attacks against the inbound convoys SC 7 and HX 79. She sank SS Beatus, SS Convallaria and SS Gunborg from SC 7 on 18 October and SS Ruperra and SS Janus from HX 79 on 19 October and 20 October respectively. On 25 October U-46 was attacked by three Lockheed Hudsons of No. 233 Squadron RAF, fatally wounding one of the crew. U-46 put into Kiel on 29 October after 17 days at sea, during which she had sunk 22,966 tons of shipping.

Her next patrol took her from Kiel on 12 February 1941 to St. Nazaire where she arrived on 4 March after 21 days at sea, during which she had not attacked any ships. Her next patrol was more successful. On 29 March SS Liguria was sunk, followed by SS Castor on 31 March and SS British Reliance on 2 April. SS Alderpool was damaged on 3 April; U-46 returned to port, having sunk three ships for 17,465 tons and damaged another for 4,313 tons. The next patrol damaged SS Ensis on 8 June and sank SS Phidias on 9 June. The damaged Ensis had rammed her attacker, damaging U-46’s conning tower and periscope, the patrol was aborted. Endrass carried out his last patrol with U-46 from 26 July until 26 August but did not attack any ships.

== Withdrawal from active service and scuttling ==
After Endrass left the boat on 24 September, U-46 was designated as a training boat with the 26th U-boat Flotilla. She came under a number of commanders: Peter-Ottmar Grau, Konstantin von Puttkamer, Kurt Neubert, Ernst von Witzendorff, Franz Saar, Joachim Knecht and Erich Jewinski, and was moved to the 24th U-boat Flotilla in April 1942. She was decommissioned at Neustadt in October 1943.

As the end of the war approached, she was scuttled on 5 May 1945 in Kupfermühlen Bay. She had sunk 20 merchant ships for a total of 85,792 GRT, two auxiliary warships for a total of 35,284 GRT and damaged another five ships, one of which was later written off.

=== Wolfpacks ===
U-46 took part in two wolfpacks

- Rösing (12–15 June 1940)
- West (19 May – 6 June 1941)

== Summary of raiding history ==
Date	Name of ship	Nationality	Tonnage (Note: Merchant ship tonnages are in gross register tons. Military vessels are listed by tons displacement.)	Fate
17 October 1939	City of Mandalay	United Kingdom	7,028	Sunk
21 December 1939	Rudolf	Norway	924	Sunk
6 June 1940	HMS Carinthia	Royal Navy	20,277	Sunk
9 June 1940	Margareta	Finland	2,155	Sunk
11 June 1940	Athelprince	United Kingdom	8,782	Damaged
12 June 1940	Barbara Marie	United Kingdom	4,223	Sunk
12 June 1940	Willowbank	United Kingdom	5,041	Sunk
17 June 1940	Elpis	Greece	3,651	Sunk
16 August 1940	Alcinuos	Netherlands	6,189	Damaged
16 August 1940	Leonidas M. Valmas	Greece	2,080	Total loss
27 August 1940	HMS Dunvegan Castle	Royal Navy	15,007	Sunk
31 August 1940	Ville de Hasselt	Belgium	7,461	Sunk
2 September 1940	Thornlea	United Kingdom	4,261	Sunk
4 September 1940	Lumineach	Ireland	1,074	Sunk
26 September 1940	Coast Wings	United Kingdom	862	Sunk
26 September 1940	Siljan	Sweden	3,058	Sunk
18 October 1940	Beatus	United Kingdom	4,885	Sunk
18 October 1940	Convallera	Sweden	1,996	Sunk
18 October 1940	Gunborg	Sweden	1,572	Sunk
18 October 1940	Ruperra	United Kingdom	4,548	Sunk
20 October 1940	Janus	Sweden	9,965	Sunk
29 March 1941	Liguria	Sweden	1,751	Sunk
31 March 1941	Castor	Sweden	8,714	Sunk
2 April 1941	British Reliance	United Kingdom	7,000	Sunk
3 April 1941	Alderpool	United Kingdom	4,313	Damaged
8 June 1941	Ensis	United Kingdom	6,207	Damaged
9 June 1941	Phidias	United Kingdom	5,623	Sunk

== Bibliography ==
- Busch, Rainer; Röll, Hans-Joachim (1999). German U-boat commanders of World War II : a biographical dictionary. Translated by Brooks, Geoffrey. London, Annapolis, Md: Greenhill Books, Naval Institute Press. ISBN 1-55750-186-6.
- Gröner, Erich (1985). Die deutschen Kriegsschiffe 1815–1945 / 3, U-Boote, Hilfskreuzer, Minenschiffe, Netzleger, Sperrbrecher (in German). Koblenz: Bernard & Graefe. ISBN 3-7637-4802-4. OCLC 310610321.
- Gröner, Erich; Jung, Dieter; Maass, Martin (1991). German Warships 1815–1945, U-boats and Mine Warfare Vessels. Vol. 2. Translated by Thomas, Keith; Magowan, Rachel. London: Conway Maritime Press. ISBN 0-85177-593-4.
