= HMAS Nestor =

Destroyer

Coordinates: 33°36′N 24°30′E

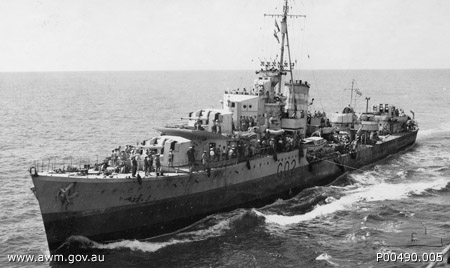
- Port bow view of HMAS Nestor in 1941

History

Australia
- Namesake: Greek mythological rule Nestor
- Builder: Fairfield Shipbuilding and Engineering Company, Limited
- Laid down: 1939
- Launched: 9 July 1940
- Commissioned: 3 February 1941
- Honours and awards: Battle honours: Bismarck 1941; Atlantic 1941; Malta Convoys 1941–42; Indian Ocean 1942
- Fate: Scuttled on 16 June 1942, following damage from bombing

General characteristics (as built)
- Class & type: N-class destroyer
- Displacement: 1,773 long tons (1,801 t) (standard); 2,384 long tons (2,422 t) (deep load)
- Length: 356 ft 6 in (108.7 m) (o/a)
- Beam: 35 ft 9 in (10.9 m)
- Draught: 12 ft 6 in (3.8 m)
- Installed power: 40,000 shp (30,000 kW); 2 × Admiralty 3-drum boilers
- Propulsion: 2 shafts; 2 steam turbines
- Speed: 36 knots (67 km/h; 41 mph)
- Range: 5,500 nmi (10,200 km; 6,300 mi) at 15 knots (28 km/h; 17 mph)
- Complement: 183
- Sensors & processing systems: ASDIC; Type 285 gunnery radar; Type 286 surface-search radar
- Armament: 3 × twin QF 4.7-inch (120 mm) Mk XII guns; 1 × single QF 4-inch Mk V (102 mm) AA gun; 4 × single 20 mm (0.8 in) Oerlikon AA guns; 2 × twin QF 0.5-inch (12.7 mm) Mk III machineguns; 1 × quintuple 21-inch (533 mm) torpedo tubes; 45 × depth charges, 1 × rack, 2 × throwers

HMAS Nestor (G02) was an N-class destroyer of the Royal Australian Navy (RAN). Built in Scotland, Nestor was commissioned in February 1941; although manned by Australians and commissioned as an Australian warship, she remained the property of the Royal Navy.

Entering service in 1941, Nestor spent most of her career as a patrol and escort vessel in the Atlantic Ocean, the Mediterranean, and the Far East. In December 1941, the destroyer located and sank the German submarine U-127. In June 1942, Nestor sailed as part of the Operation Vigorous escort force, protecting a supply convoy to Malta. On the evening of 15 June, the ship was heavily damaged by air attack. Despite attempts to tow the ship to base, Nestor was abandoned and scuttled off Crete the next morning. Nestor is the only ship of the RAN that never operated in Australian waters.

== Design and construction ==
The N-class destroyer had a displacement of 1,773 tons at standard load, and 2,550 tons at full load. Nestor was 356 feet 6 inches (108.66 m) long overall and 229 feet 6 inches (69.95 m) long between perpendiculars, had a beam of 35 feet 8 inches (10.87 m), and a maximum draught of 16 feet 4 inches (4.98 m). Propulsion was provided by Admiralty 3-drum boilers connected to Parsons geared steam turbines, which provided 40,000 shaft horsepower (30,000 kW) to the ship's two propellers. Nestor was capable of reaching 36 knots (67 km/h; 41 mph). The ship's company consisted of 249 officers and sailors at the time she was sunk.

The ship's armament consisted of six 4.7-inch QF Mark XII guns in three twin mounts, a single 4-inch QF Mark V gun, a 2-pounder 4-barrel "pom pom", four 0.5-inch machine guns, four 20 mm Oerlikon anti-aircraft guns, four .303 Lewis machine guns, two Pentad torpedo launcher tube sets (with 10 torpedoes carried), two depth-charge throwers and one depth-charge chute (with 45 charges carried). The 4-inch gun was removed later in Nestor's career.

Nestor was laid down by the Fairfield Shipbuilding and Engineering Company, Limited, at Govan, Scotland in 1939. She was launched on 9 July 1940 by the daughter of one of the shipyard directors. Nestor was commissioned into the RAN on 3 February 1941; although manned and commissioned as an Australian warship, the destroyer remained the property of the Royal Navy. The destroyer's name came from the mythological ruler. The ship cost 398,960 pounds to build.

== Operational history ==
During sea trials, Nestor was called on to make several deployments north of the British Isles, in poor conditions. On 14 May, the sailors aboard mutinied in response to the heavy drinking sessions of the ship's captain and two other senior officers: they locked themselves in their accommodations and refused to man the ship until the officers were removed. The ship's doctor visited the admiral at Scapa Flow (where the ship was based); the admiral sent marines to arrest the three officers, and appointed a new commander to Nestor.

After completing sea trials, Nestor was assigned to escort and patrol duties in the North Atlantic. During May, she was involved in the pursuit of the German battleship Bismarck, but had diverted to Iceland for fuel when the Allied force encountered and sank the German ship. Nestor was transferred to the Mediterranean in July, and was involved in the Malta Convoys, then performed escort duties in the South Atlantic before returning to England for refit in October. The destroyer returned to service as a Malta Convoy escort in December. On 15 December, Nestor encountered the German submarine U-127 off Cape St. Vincent; the destroyer successfully hunted down and destroyed the submarine with depth charges.

In January 1942, Nestor was reassigned to the Far East. During the voyage, Nestor and several sister ships escorted the aircraft carrier HMS Indomitable during attempts to deliver aircraft to Malaya. After this, Nestor joined the British Eastern Fleet, and was based at Colombo. In March 1942, the town of Andover, Hampshire adopted Nestor after they raised £214,467 during a Warship Week. In May 1942, the destroyer was assigned back to the Mediterranean.

== Loss ==
On 12 June 1942, Nestor sailed from Haifa as part of the large escort force for Operation Vigorous, a Malta Convoy consisting of 11 merchant ships carrying food, fuel, and supplies for the besieged island. Air harassment of the convoy began almost immediately after leaving port. During the afternoon of 15 June, the convoy received word that a second convoy (Operation Harpoon) sailing from the west had successfully arrived, and based on the quantity of air attacks and intelligence that an Italian fleet was in the area, it was decided to return the Vigorous convoy to Alexandria.

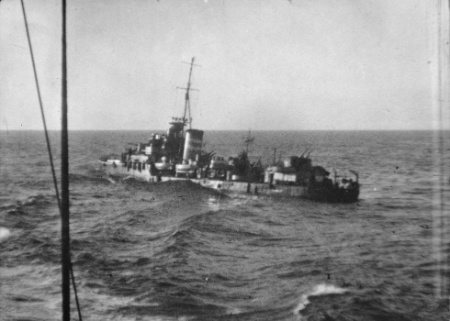
Nestor sinking after being scuttled

According to one source, at around 18:00, while off Crete, an Italian bomber attacked Nestor, killing four sailors and seriously damaging the destroyer's engine rooms. Other sources assert the attack was carried out by Junkers Ju 87 dive bombers from Sturzkampfgeschwader 3. HMS Javelin began to tow Nestor, but by 05:30 on 16 June, the quantity of water taken on by the Australian ship meant that recovery was no longer practical. The ship's company transferred to Javelin, and Nestor was scuttled with depth charges. Nestor was the only major RAN ship to never visit Australia.

Nestor's wartime service was recognised with four battle honours: "Bismarck 1941", "Atlantic 1941", "Malta Convoys 1941–42", and "Indian Ocean 1942". The ship's bell was recovered, and is on display at the museum at HMAS Cerberus.
