= HMS Samphire =

Flower-class corvette

Coordinates: 36°56′0″N 5°40′0″E

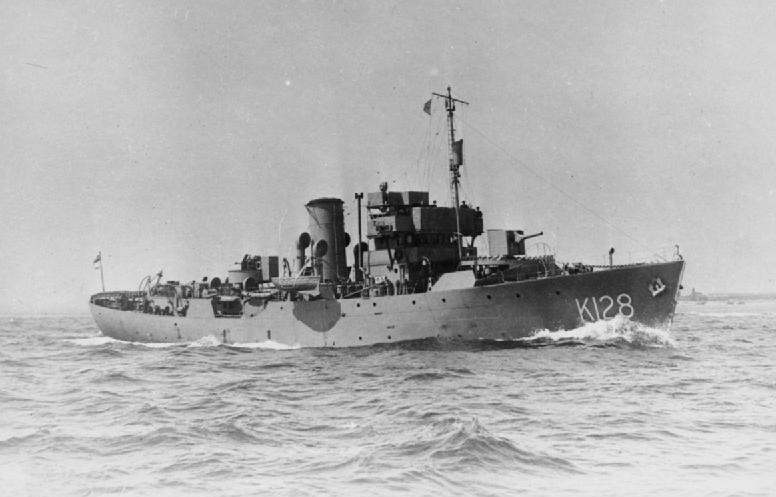

History

United Kingdom
- Name: HMS Samphire
- Ordered: 25 July 1939
- Builder: Smiths Dock Company, South Bank, Middlesbrough
- Laid down: 4 December 1940
- Launched: 14 April 1941
- Commissioned: 30 June 1941
- Identification: Pennant number: K128
- Fate: Sunk on 30 January 1943

General characteristics
- Class & type: Flower-class corvette
- Displacement: 925 long tons (940 t)
- Length: 205 ft (62 m)
- Beam: 33 ft (10 m)
- Draught: 11.5 ft (3.5 m)
- Propulsion: Two fire tube boilers; one 4-cycle triple-expansion steam engine
- Speed: 16 knots (30 km/h) at 2,750 hp (2,050 kW)
- Range: 3,500 nautical miles (6,500 km; 4,000 mi) at 12 knots (22 km/h; 14 mph)
- Complement: 85 men
- Armament: 1 × BL 4-inch (101.6 mm) Mk IX gun, two .50 inch (12.7 mm) twin machine guns, two .303 inch (7.7-mm) Lewis machine guns; two stern depth charge racks with 40 depth charges

HMS Samphire was a Flower-class corvette that served in the Royal Navy.

She was built by Smiths Dock Company, in South Bank-on-Tees, and was commissioned into the Royal Navy on 30 June 1941.

== Wartime service ==
Samphire was assigned to the 36th Escort Group and tasked with convoy escort operations between Liverpool and the Mediterranean Sea. On 21 December 1941, she successfully released depth charges with the British sloop Deptford resulting in the sinking of the German submarine U-567 in the North Atlantic northeast of the Azores. All 47 men on board the U-567 were killed. On 8 November 1942, she escorted USS Leedstown (AP-73) from the Mediterranean after she had been attacked by German aircraft, which hit the Leedstown with an aerial torpedo in the stern the day earlier. At 12:55 on 9 November, German aircraft attacked again, however Samphire shot down one attacker and then escorted the Leedstown to anchor near Cape Matifu, about 12 miles (19 km) from Algiers. On 14 December 1942, Samphire assisted in the rescue of nine survivors from the British merchant ship Edencrag, which had been torpedoed and sunk by the German submarine U-443 west of Algiers.

=== Sinking ===
Samphire was torpedoed and sunk on 30 January 1943 off Bougie, Algeria by the Italian submarine Platino. Samphire was escorting convoy TE-14 which was taking part in the North African campaign. The captain, two officers and 42 of the ship's crew perished.
