= HMS Gardenia (K99) =

Flower-class corvette that served in the Royal Navy

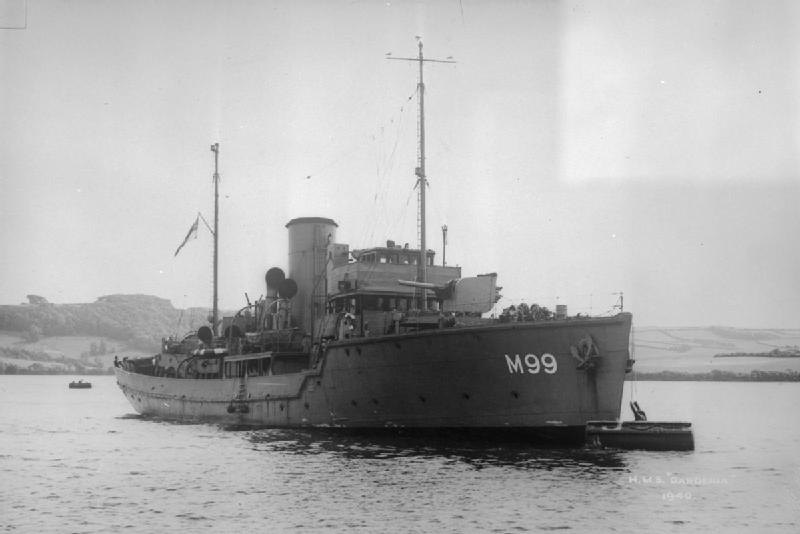
- HMS Gardenia anchored in the 1940s.

History

United Kingdom
- Name: Gardenia
- Namesake: Gardenia
- Builder: William Simons and Company, Renfrew
- Laid down: 20 September 1939
- Launched: 10 April 1940
- Commissioned: 24 May 1940
- Identification: Pennant number: K99
- Fate: Sunk in a collision, 9 November 1942

General characteristics
- Class & type: Flower-class corvette
- Displacement: 925 long tons
- Length: 205 ft (62 m) o/a
- Beam: 33 ft (10 m)
- Draught: 11 ft 6 in (3.51 m)
- Propulsion: 1 × 4-cycle triple-expansion reciprocating steam engine; 2 × fire tube Scotch boilers; Single shaft; 2,750 ihp (2,050 kW)
- Speed: 16 kn (30 km/h)
- Range: 3,500 nmi (6,500 km) at 12 kn (22 km/h)
- Complement: 85
- Sensors & processing systems: 1 × SW1C or 2C radar; 1 × Type 123A or Type 127DV sonar
- Armament: 1 × BL 4-inch (101.6 mm) Mk.IX gun; 2 × Vickers .50 cal machine gun (twin); 2 × Lewis .303 cal machine gun (twin); 2 × Mk.II Depth charge throwers; 2 × Depth charge rails with 40 depth charges

HMS Gardenia was a Flower-class corvette that served in the Royal Navy and was built by William Simons and Company in 1940. She was named after Gardenia. Commissioned in 1940, rammed and sunk by HMS Fluellen on 9 November 1942.

== Design and description ==
In early 1939, with the risk of war with Nazi Germany increasing, it was clear to the Royal Navy that it needed more escort ships to counter the threat from Kriegsmarine U-boats. One particular concern was the need to protect shipping off the east coast of Britain. What was needed was something larger and faster than trawlers, but still cheap enough to be built in large numbers, preferably at small merchant shipyards, as larger yards were already busy. To meet this requirement, the Smiths Dock Company of Middlesbrough, a specialist in the design and build of fishing vessels, offered a development of its 700-ton, 16 knots (18 mph; 30 km/h) whale catcher Southern Pride. They were intended as small convoy escort ships that could be produced quickly and cheaply in large numbers. Despite naval planners' intentions that they be deployed for coastal convoys, their long range meant that they became the mainstay of Mid-Ocean Escort Force convoy protection during the first half of the war. The original Flowers had the standard RN layout, consisting of a raised forecastle, a well deck, then the bridge or wheelhouse, and a continuous deck running aft. The crew quarters were in the foc'sle while the galley was at the rear, making for poor messing arrangements.

The modified Flowers saw the forecastle extended aft past the bridge to the aft end of the funnel, a variation known as the "long forecastle" design. Apart from providing a very useful space where the whole crew could gather out of the weather, the added weight improved the ships' stability and speed and was retroactively applied to a number of the original Flower-class vessels during the mid and latter years of the war.

== Construction and career ==
Gardenia was laid down by William Simons and Company at their shipyard at Renfrew, on 20 September 1939 and launched on 10 April 1940. She was commissioned on 24 May 1940.

Gardenia collided with HMS Fluellen and sank off Oran, Algeria on 9 November 1942.

== Sources ==
- Chesneau, Roger, ed. (1980). Conway's All the World's Fighting Ships 1922–1946. Greenwich, UK: Conway Maritime Press. ISBN 0-85177-146-7.
- Colledge, J. J.; Warlow, Ben (2006) [1969]. Ships of the Royal Navy: The Complete Record of All Fighting Ships of the Royal Navy from the 15th Century to the Present (3rd Rev ed.). London: Chatham Publishing. ISBN 978-1-86176-281-8. OCLC 67375475.
- Goodwin, Norman (2007). Castle Class Corvettes: An Account of the Service of the Ships and of Their Ships' Companies. Liskeard, UK: Maritime Books. ISBN 978-1-904459-27-9.
- Lenton, H. T. (1998). British & Empire Warships of the Second World War. Annapolis, Maryland: Naval Institute Press. ISBN 1-55750-048-7.
- Rohwer, Jürgen (2005). Chronology of the War at Sea 1939–1945: The Naval History of World War Two (Third Revised ed.). Annapolis, Maryland: Naval Institute Press. ISBN 1-59114-119-2.
