= RMS Carinthia (1925) =

1925–1940 steamship

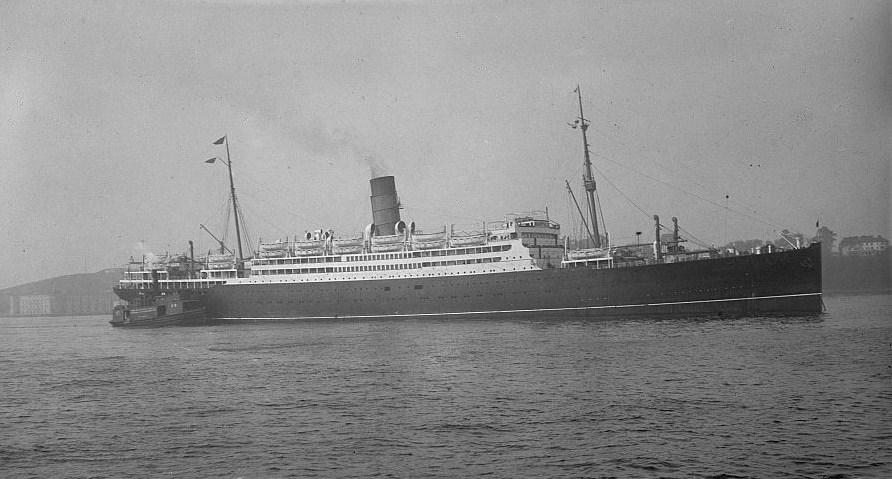

History

United Kingdom
- Name: RMS Carinthia
- Namesake: Carinthia
- Operator: Cunard White Star Line, Liverpool
- Ordered: 1924
- Builder: Vickers-Armstrongs, Barrow-in-Furness
- Yard number: 586
- Launched: 24 February 1925
- Fate: Torpedoed and sunk on 7 June 1940

General characteristics
- Type: Passenger Liner
- Tonnage: 20,277 GRT, 12,088 NRT
- Length: 624 ft (190 m) overall
- Beam: 73.5 ft (22.4 m)
- Draught: 45 ft (14 m)
- Propulsion: Four sets of steam turbines; Twin propellers
- Speed: 16.5 knots (30.6 km/h)
- Capacity: 1,650 passengers
- Crew: 450 officers and men

RMS Carinthia was first laid down in Barrow-in-Furness in 1924 with the yard number Hull 586. Originally she had the name Servia but was renamed at the time of her launching on 24 February 1925. She made her maiden voyage on 22 August 1925 from Liverpool to New York City. At her launch she was the largest of the five post First World War intermediate size liners.

== Features ==
RMS Carinthia was noted for her comfortable accommodation in 3rd class. The dining room provided small tables for travelling parties of family and friends, an innovation at the time. There was also a smoking room and small library and a shop for the third class passengers needs. The first class restaurant was called the Adams room and had silver lamps on each table. The ship was also well equipped for sport with an arena that covered 5,000 square feet (460 m^{2}) over two decks and included a swimming pool, gymnasium, racket courts and shower and bath rooms for massage treatments. On the "A" deck there was the 1st class smoke room which had been modelled after the house of El Greco, the Spanish painter, the room also contained an American bar. The first class lounge was furnished and decorated to represent the period of King William of Orange.

== Service ==
The Carinthia plied the Atlantic on the Liverpool-Boston-New York route. She was also used for cruising. In 1931 her passenger accommodation was altered. Instead of 1st, 2nd, and 3rd Classes, she now had Cabin Class, Tourist Class and 3rd Class. During 1933 she made a world cruise calling at 40 ports including Tristan da Cunha, (known as the remotest island on the planet) covering 40,000 miles (64,000 km). In 1933 RMS Carinthia received an SOS from the Latvian steamer Andromeda which had struck an unknown submerged object. The incident had happened eighty miles from Ushant in the English Channel but Carinthia had been too far away to make a rescue and the ship sank. The crew of the steamer were rescued by the steamship Hartside.

In 1934, she was transferred to the London–Le Havre–Southampton–New York route. From 1935 until 1939 she was reverted to New York and used for Winter cruising. As she no longer carried the Royal Mail across the Atlantic, she was re-designated as the SS Carinthia. Her hull was painted white with a green boot-topping for the cruising duties. On 20 September 1938, the Carinthia was on a cruise from New York to the Caribbean, 150 miles north of Florida when she was warned of bad weather ahead, the infamous 1938 hurricane. She turned to avoid the storm, but the storm also turned and she sailed right into it. Despite category 5 winds and huge seas, she survived the storm with only cosmetic damage and sick passengers.

In August 1939, she was converted into an armed merchant cruiser, retaining the name Carinthia. She was accepted into service on 30 December 1939. At 13.13 hours on 6 June 1940, the Carinthia, on a northern patrol, was torpedoed off the coast of Ireland west of Galway Bay, in coordinates 53°13′N 10°40′W by the German submarine U-46. The badly damaged ship remained afloat for 36 hours before she sank during the evening of 7 June. Four people died during the sinking – two crew members and two ratings.

One of the two officers lost was Mr Robert Yeates, from Belfast, who had for many years been chief engineer for the Cunard White Star Line.

== Wreck ==
The wreck lies at the position (53°13′N 10°40′W) at a depth of 384 ft – 117m, 30 miles east of Bloody Foreland.

== Bibliography ==
- Osborne, Richard; Spong, Harry & Grover, Tom (2007). Armed Merchant Cruisers 1878–1945. Windsor, UK: World Warship Society. ISBN 978-0-9543310-8-5.
