= Convoy HG 84 =

Convoy during naval battles of the Second World War

- Part of the Second World War
Date	10–20 June 1942
Location	eastern Atlantic
Result	Inconclusive

Belligerents
Germany	United Kingdom

Commanders and leaders
Karl Dönitz	Hubert Hudson; Frederic Walker

Strength
9 U-boats	23 Ships; 7 Escorts

Casualties and losses
3 U-boats damaged	5 Ships sunk

HG 84 was an Allied convoy of the HG (Homeward from Gibraltar) series during the Second World War.

== Background ==
Following the U-boat Arm's defeat whilst attacking Convoy HG 76, the U-boat high command, Befehlshaber der U-Boote (BdU), had temporarily stopped attacks against convoys on the Gibraltar route. This was overtaken by the shift in focus to Operation Drumbeat, the offensive against US shipping off the American east coast and for six months the route was left undisturbed. Seven outbound and seven homebound convoys, averaging 20 ships each, sailed without loss. In June 1942 BdU determined that renewing the attack there would be profitable once more as it would achieve strategic surprise.

== Forces involved ==
Convoy HG 84 comprised 20 ships homeward bound from Gibraltar, many in ballast or carrying trade goods. The convoy commodore was Captain Hubert Hudson, who had been the navigator on the Imperial Trans-Antarctic Expedition, in Pelayo and the convoy was protected the 36th Escort Group (Frederick Walker) somewhat understrength and consisting of the sloop HMS Stork and three corvettes HMS Convolvulus, HMS Gardenia and HMS Marigold. The convoy was accompanied by a CAM ship, SS Empire Moon and the rescue ship Copeland.

Ranged against them was the wolfpack Endrass (named after the U-boat commander Engelbert Endrass) of nine U-boats (U-71, U-84, U-89, U-132, U-134, U-437, U-552, U-571 and U-575).

== Action ==
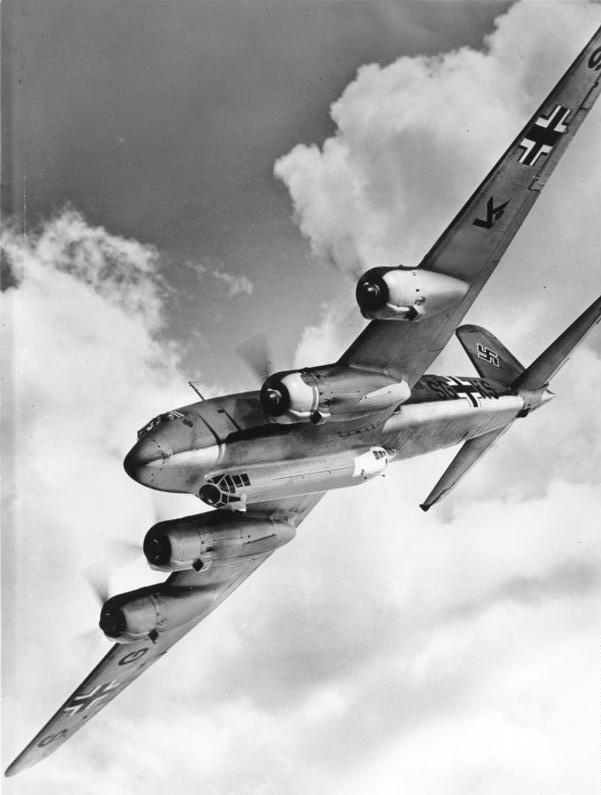
Example of a Focke-Wulf Fw 200 C Condor

Convoy HG 84 sailed from Gibraltar on 9 June 1942, undetected by Axis patrols. On 11 June the convoy was joined by three ships bound for Britain from Lisbon in Portugal. These ships had been shadowed by German Fw 200 Condors based at Bordeaux, that maintained contact while wolfpack Endrass moved to intercept. On 14 June U-552 (Kapitänleutnant Erich Topp) made contact with the convoy, to be joined that evening by U-89, U-132 and U-437. The convoy escorts were able to pinpoint the shadowing U-boats by HF/DF and conducted an aggressive defence, attacking the U-boats as they attempted to close.

Stork and Gardenia attacked U-132, causing severe damage and forcing her to abandon the battle and leave the pack. Marigold and Convolvulus attacked U-89 and U-437 over a period of 31 hours. U-552 was able to penetrate the screen and made two attacks. The first, just after midnight on 14/15 June, hit and sank the ships Etrib, Pelayo and Slemdal. Hudson, on Pelayo, was among those lost. Four hours later, having reloaded, U-552 again penetrated the escort screen and sank City of Oxford and Thurso. During the next day, 15 June, five more boats arrived but Walker's ships continued their aggressive defence, fiercely attacking all attempts by the U-boats to close on the convoy. During this period U-552 and U-71 suffered damage and had to withdraw. U-575 managed to close and fire but her torpedoes missed and there was no damage.

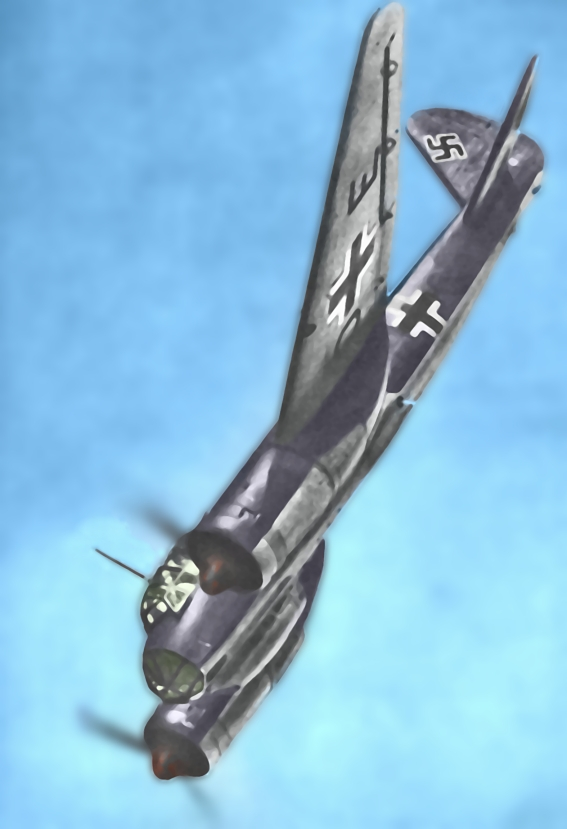
Example of a Junkers 88 dive-bombing

On 16 June the convoy was joined by three more warships, the destroyer HMS Wild Swan and frigates Rother and Spey. The convoy also came within range of Coastal Command aircraft and these were able to further suppress U-boat attacks. The convoy was also in range of German aircraft and during the day the convoy was attacked by Junkers Ju 88 dive-bombers. Wild Swan came under attack while investigating a group of Spanish trawlers which came close to the convoy. She and the trawlers were bombed and Wild Swan, with four of the Spanish trawlers, was sunk. On 17 June, with the arrival of more Allied aircraft, BdU called off the attack. Convoy HG 84 arrived at Liverpool on 20 June without further loss.

== Conclusion ==
While wolfpack Endrass had had some success, it was not the victory BdU had wanted. Three of the nine U-boats had been severely damaged, though only two, U-71 and U-552 had to return to base; U-132 was able to carry out repairs at sea and was able to continue her patrol. Convoy HG 84 had lost five ships, yet 17 ships arrived safely. Walker was commended for his handling of the defence and it was recognised he had been able to prevent further losses despite the disparity in numbers and to avert a big defeat.

== Ships sunk ==
Ships lost
Name	Year	Flag	GRT	Notes
City of Oxford	1926	United Kingdom	2,759	Sunk 15 June 1942, 43°32'N, 18°12'W, U-552, 1 killed, 43 survivors
Etrib	1919	United Kingdom	1,943	Sunk 15 June 1942, 43°18'N, 17°38'W, U-552, 4 killed, 36 survivors
Pelayo	1927	United Kingdom	1,345	Sunk 15 June 1942, 43°18'N, 17°38'W U-552, 16 killed, 31 survivors
Slemdal	1931	Norway	7,374	Sunk 15 June 1942, 43°28'N, 17°35'W U-552, 37 survivors
Thurso	1919	United Kingdom	2,436	15 June 1942, 43°41'N, 18°02'W U-552, 13 killed, 29 survivors
