= HMS Marigold (K87) =

Flower-class corvette

Coordinates: 36°50′00″N 03°00′00″E

History

United Kingdom
- Name: HMS Marigold
- Ordered: 31 August 1939
- Builder: Hall, Russell & Company, Aberdeen, Scotland
- Laid down: 26 January 1940
- Launched: 16 November 1940
- Commissioned: 28 February 1941
- Identification: Pennant number: K87
- Fate: Sunk in air attack on 9 December 1942

General characteristics
- Class & type: Flower-class corvette
- Displacement: 925 long tons (940 t)
- Length: 205 ft (62 m)
- Beam: 33 ft (10 m)
- Draught: 11.5 ft (3.5 m)
- Propulsion: Two fire tube boilers; one 4-cycle triple-expansion steam engine
- Speed: 16 knots (30 km/h) at 2,750 hp (2,050 kW)
- Range: 3,500 nmi (6,500 km; 4,000 mi) at 12 knots (22 km/h; 14 mph)
- Complement: 85
- Armament: 1 × BL 4 in (102 mm) Mk IX gun, 2 × .50 inch (12.7 mm) twin machine guns, 2 × .303 inch (7.7-mm) Lewis machine guns; 2 × stern depth charge racks with 40 depth charges

HMS Marigold was a Flower-class corvette of the Royal Navy. She was launched on 4 September 1940 and was sunk by an Italian air-dropped torpedo on 9 December 1942.

== Design and construction ==
The Flower class arose as a result of the Royal Navy's realisation in the late 1930s that it had a shortage of escort vessels, particularly coastal escorts for use on the East coast of Britain, as the likelihood of war with Germany increased. To meet this urgent requirement, a design developed based on the whale-catcher Southern Pride - this design was much more capable than naval trawlers, but cheaper and quicker to build than the Hunt-class destroyers or Kingfisher-class sloops that were alternatives for the coastal escort role.

The Flowers were 205 feet 0 inches (62.48 m) long overall, 196 feet 0 inches (59.74 m) at the waterline and 190 feet 0 inches (57.91 m) between perpendiculars. Beam was 33 feet 0 inches (10.06 m) and draught was 14 feet 10 inches (4.52 m) aft. Displacement was about 940 long tons (960 t) standard and 1,170 long tons (1,190 t) full load. Two Admiralty three-drum water tube boilers fed steam to a vertical triple expansion engine rated at 2,750 indicated horsepower (2,050 kW) which drove a single propeller shaft. This gave a speed of 16 knots (18 mph; 30 km/h). 200 tons of oil were carried, giving a range of 4,000 nautical miles (7,400 km; 4,600 mi) at 12 knots (22 km/h; 14 mph).

Design armament was a single BL 4-inch Mk IX naval gun forward and a single 2-pounder "pom-pom" anti-aircraft cannon aft, although the pom-poms were not available until 1941, so early Flowers such as Marigold were completed with improvised close-range anti aircraft armament such as Lewis guns or Vickers .50 machine guns instead.

Marigold was one of 24 Flowers ordered by the British Admiralty on 31 August 1939 under the 1939/40 Naval estimates. She was laid down at Hall, Russell & Company's Aberdeen shipyard on 21 January 1940, was launched on 4 September 1940 and completed on 28 February 1941.

== Service ==
Marigold served in a number of the theatres of the Second World War.

On 7 May 1941, Marigold, a member of the 7th Escort Group, was part of the escort for the westbound Atlantic convoy Convoy OB 318. That night, the convoy was attacked by the German submarine U-94 200 miles (320 km) south west of Reykjavík, Iceland. U-94 torpedoed and sunk two merchant ships. Marigold picked up 19 survivors from one of the ships sunk in the attack, SS Ixion. Meanwhile, U-94 was driven off by a sustained depth charge attack by the destroyers Bulldog and Amazon and the sloop Rochester. The corvettes of the 7th Escort Group, including Marigold were relieved by ships from the 3rd Escort group on 8 May, allowing the 7th Escort Group ships to join the inbound Convoy HX 123. Attacks on OB 318 continued, with three merchant ships sunk on 8 May, at the cost of U-110 which was captured by British warships, sinking under tow.

Marigold remained part of the 7th Escort Group on 1 July 1941. From 18 August Marigold, now part of Escort Group 36, formed part of the escort of Convoy HG 71, bound for the UK from Gibraltar. While four Italian submarines were deployed against the convoy, none managed to find it, and HG 71 reached Liverpool unharmed on 1 September. On 12 September 1941, Marigold left Liverpool as part of the escort for the Gibraltar-bound convoy OG 74. Two merchant ships were sunk by the German submarine U-124 on the night of 20/21 September, while the rescue ship Walmer Castle was badly damaged by a German Focke-Wulf Fw 200 Condor long-range bomber on 21 September and was scuttled by Marigold and the sloop Deptford. Marigold and Deptford were then detached from the convoy to support four ships that had lost contact with the convoy, but three of the four ships were sunk by U-201 on the night of 21/22 September. Marigold arrived in Gibraltar on 26 September. In total, six ships from OG 74 were sunk. Marigold remained part of the 36th Escort Group on 1 October 1941.

On 16 November 1941, Marigold set out from Gibraltar as part of Operation Chieftain, a diversion operation for Operation Crusader, the British offensive in the North African desert. The operation was a dummy convoy (with empty merchant ships) intended to attract attention of German and Italian air power away from the land battle. That night Marigold which had lost contact with the convoy because of engine trouble, and was trying to rejoin the convoy, was spotted by the German submarine U-433 30 miles East of Europa Point and south of Málaga. U-433 misidentified the corvette for a cruiser and attacked with a spread of four torpedoes, all of which missed. Marigold then detected the surfaced submarine on radar at a range of about 4,000 yards (3,700 m) and attacked, but U-433 dived away before Marigold could ram the submarine. An initial pattern of five depth charges was ineffective, but after 15 minutes, Marigold detected the submarine on sonar, and attacked with ten depth charges, causing the commander of U-433 to surface the submarine so that the crew could abandon ship. Marigold opened fire on the submarine when it surfaced and U-433 sank quickly. Marigold picked up 38 survivors, with six of U-433's crew killed. The First Sea Lord congratulated the Marigold and its commander, Lieutenant William MacDonald R.N.V.R., on this action.

On 14 December 1941, Marigold, now part of the 36th Escort Group, left Gibraltar as part of Convoy HG 76. The convoy came under sustained U-boat attack from 17 December, and on 19 December, Marigold carried out a depth charge attack on a U-boat, which although failing to sink the submarine, helped to drive the U-boat away from the convoy. In total, the escort carrier HMS Audacity, the destroyer Stanley and two merchant ships were sunk by German submarines, while the convoy's escort sank three U-boats.

On 9 June 1942, the 36th Escort Group, including Marigold, left Gibraltar escorting Convoy HG 84. Marigold and the corvette Convolvulus attacked and drove off the submarines U-89 and U-437 on 14 June. On 15 June 1942 she picked up 41 survivors from the British merchant SS Etrib, 20 survivors from the Norwegian tanker SS Slemdal and 29 survivors from the British merchant SS Thurso that had been torpedoed and sunk by U-552 380 miles (610 km) West of Corunna, Spain. On the night of 15/16 June, Marigold, Convolvulus and the sloop Stork drove off the U-boats U-71, U-84 and U552. On 13 November 1942 she rescued 81 survivors from the British merchant SS Maron which had been torpedoed and sunk by U-81 off Oran, Algeria.

== Sinking ==
On the afternoon of 9 December 1942 Marigold was escorting convoy MKS 3Y, off Algiers, Algeria when she came under attack by three Italian S.79 VTBs torpedo bombers of 254^{a} Squadriglia (254th squadron) of 105º Gruppo AS (105th Torpedo group). Marigold was hit by a single torpedo and sank after about 9 minutes, with 40 of her crew killed.

== Sources ==
- Blair, Clay (2000). Hitler's U-Boat War: The Hunters 1939–1942. London: Cassell & Co. ISBN 0-304-35260-8.
- Elliott, Peter (1977). Allied Escort Ships of World War II: A complete survey. London: Macdonald and Jane's Publishers. ISBN 0-356-08401-9.
- Friedman, Norman (2008). British Destroyers and Frigates: The Second World War and After. Barnsley, UK: Seaforth Publishing. ISBN 978-1-84832-015-4.
- H.M. Ships Damaged or Sunk by Enemy Action: 3rd. SEPT. 1939 to 2nd. SEPT. 1945. Admiralty. 1952.
- Kemp, Paul (1997). U-Boats Destroyed: German Submarine Losses in the World Wars. London: Arms & Armour Press. ISBN 1-85409-321-5.
- Kemp, Paul (1999). The Admiralty Regrets: British Warship Losses of the 20th Century. Sutton Publishing. ISBN 0-7509-1567-6.
- Lambert, John; Brown, Les (2008). Flower-Class Corvettes. St. Catharines, Ontario, Canada: Vanwall Publishing. ISBN 978-1-55068-986-0.
- Rohwer, Jürgen; Hümmelchen, Gerhard (1992). Chronology of the War at Sea 1939–1945. London: Greenhill Books. ISBN 1-85367-117-7.
- Shores, Christopher; Massimello, Giovanni; Guest, Russell; Olynyk, Frank; Bock, Winfried (2016). A History of the Mediterranean Air War: Volume Three: Tunisia and the End in Africa: November 1942. London: Grub Street. ISBN 978-1-910690-00-0.
- Smith, Peter C. (1985). HMS Wild Swan. London: William Kimber. ISBN 0-7183-0542-6.
