= Wolfpack Endrass =

Endrass was a "wolfpack" of German U-boats that operated from 12 to 17 June 1942 in attacking Convoy HG 84 that comprised 23 Allied ships. The group's name commemorated the U-boat commander Engelbert Endrass, who was killed in action in December 1941.

== U-boats, commanders and dates ==
- U-71, Walter Flachsenberg, 12–16 June
- U-84, Horst Uphoff, 12–17 June
- U-89, Dietrich Lohmann, 12–17 June
- U-132, Ernst Vogelsang, 12–17 June
- U-134, Rudolf Schendel, 12–17 June
- U-437, Werner-Karl Schulz, 12–17 June
- U-552, Erich Topp, 12–17 June
- U-571, Helmut Möhlmann, 12–17 June
- U-575, Günther Heydemann, 12–17 June

== Ships hit by this Wolfpack ==
Five ships of Convoy HG 84, assembled at Gibraltar for passage to Liverpool, were sunk, all by the U-boat U-552 in the early hours of 15 June.

=== Etrib, Pelayo & Slemdal ===
The first attack came at 00:59, about 700 kilometres (380 nmi) west of Corunna, Spain, when U-552 fired torpedoes at the convoy and hit and sank the 1,943-ton British merchant ship Etrib, the 1,346-ton British merchant ship Pelayo, and the 7,374-ton Norwegian tanker Slemdal.

=== City of Oxford and Thurso ===
U-552 struck again at 04:34, firing three torpedoes at the convoy. Two British merchant ships, the 2,759-ton City of Oxford and the 2,436-ton Thurso were hit and sunk.
