= Endrass =

The name Endrass or Endraß can refer to, depending on context:

- Engelbert Endrass, a U-boat commander in World War II
- Wolf pack Endrass, a German "wolfpack" of World War II
