= SS David H. Atwater =

History

United States
- Name: David H. Atwater
- Owner: Atwacoal Transportation Co., Fall River, Massachusetts
- Builder: Great Lakes Engineering Works, Ashtabula, Ohio
- Yard number: 505A
- Launched: June 1919
- Sponsored by: U.S. Shipping Board
- Fate: Sunk 2 April 1942

General characteristics
- Type: Steam cargo ship
- Tonnage: 2,600 GRT; 4,125 LT DWT
- Length: 253.33 ft (77.21 m)
- Beam: 43.5 ft (13.3 m)
- Depth: 25 ft (7.6 m)
- Crew: 8 officers, 19 men

SS David H. Atwater was a United States Merchant Marine coastal steamer which was sunk on 2 April 1942 by gunfire from the German submarine U-552 during World War II. The circumstances of the destruction of the vessel along with almost all of its crew fueled persistent rumours at the time of war crimes being perpetrated by Nazi Germany's U-boat fleets on the high seas against shipwrecked Allied sailors.

== History ==
The ship began life as Crabtree, constructed by the Great Lakes Engineering Works of Ashtabula, Ohio for the United States Shipping Board, hull number 505A, and launched in June 1919. She was renamed W.J. Crosby in 1922, for the North Shore Transit Company of Port Huron, Michigan, and in 1929 was sold to the Canada Forwarding Company Ltd. of Port Arthur, Ontario. In 1935 she was renamed David H. Atwater for the Atwacoal Transportation Company of Fall River, Massachusetts, which became her home port.

=== Sinking ===
On the night of 2 April 1942, at the height of the U-boat offensive against US shipping known as the Second Happy Time, the David H. Atwater was en route from Norfolk, Virginia to Fall River, Massachusetts, with a full load of 4,000 tons of coal. Her master, William K. Webster, had disregarded instructions and sailed from the Chesapeake in the afternoon, therefore could not make the run to the Delaware Capes before nightfall.

Around 21:00, between Cape Charles and Cape Henlopen, the ship was ambushed by U-552, commanded by Erich Topp, which had followed her underwater. U-552 surfaced about 600 yd (550 m) from the freighter and opened fire with her 88 mm (3.5 in) deck gun and automatic weapons (possibly including the submarine's 20 mm cannon) without warning, one of her first shells destroying the bridge and killing all of the officers. In all, 93 shots were fired from the deck gun, with 50 hits being recorded on the small freighter, which rapidly began to sink. Many of David H. Atwater's crewmen were hit as they tried to man the lifeboats. When Captain Webster was shot, the crew abandoned attempts to launch the lifeboats and leapt into the sea.

=== Aftermath ===
The first ship to arrive on the scene was the small United States Coast Guard patrol boat CG-218, the crew of which found a lifeboat holding three survivors and three bodies; the survivors reported that they had dived overboard and swam to the boat. Next on the scene was the cutter USCGC Legare, the crew of which had heard the gunfire and arrived just fifteen minutes later. Legare's crew members found a second lifeboat with a body aboard; the boat was discovered to have been riddled by gunfire, and lent strength to the widespread belief at the time that U-boats were deliberately murdering the survivors of ships they had sunk. The Legare landed the three survivors and four bodies at Chincoteague Island Coastguard Station, then returned to sea to carry out further searching. The United States Navy destroyers USS Noa and USS Herbert were directed to the scene at 21:22 and arrived at 24:00, but U-552 had by then escaped the scene, going on to sink other vessels.

Bodies, and lifeboats and liferafts from the David H. Atwater recovered by the Coast Guard were landed at Ocean City, Maryland. It was commonly believed at the time that U-552 had deliberately machine-gunned the David H. Atwater's crewmen in the boats and rafts.

== Liberty ship William Cox ==
The Liberty ship SS William Cox, launched on 30 December 1944, was named for one of David H. Atwater's firemen.
