= SS City of Oxford =

Coordinates: 43°41′N 18°2′W

History

United Kingdom
- Name: SS City of Oxford
- Owner: Ellerman and Papayanni Lines
- Builder: Swan, Hunter & Wigham Richardson Ltd., Newcastle Upon Tyne
- Yard number: 1291
- Launched: 14 July 1926
- Completed: December 1926
- Fate: Sunk on 15 June 1942

General characteristics
- Tonnage: 2,759 GRT
- Length: 102 m (335 ft)
- Beam: 14 m (46 ft)
- Draught: 6 ft 40 in (2.84 m)
- Propulsion: 3 cyl triple expansion engine power; 306 nhp
- Speed: 10 knots (19 km/h; 12 mph)
- Crew: 44

SS City of Oxford was a steam merchant ship built in 1926 by Swan, Hunter & Wigham Richardson Ltd., in Newcastle-upon-Tyne and sunk by a German submarine on 15 June 1942. Measuring 2,759 gross register tons she entered service with the Ellerman and Papayanni subsidiary of Ellerman Lines, and served during the Second World War.

On her final voyage under Master Alfred Norbury, she was in "position No.54 in the convoy, being the last ship in the 5th column", part of Convoy HG 84 travelling from Lisbon to Garston, and had called at Gibraltar on 9 June to join with the 36th Escort Group under the command of Captain "Johnnie" Walker. She was carrying two thousand tons of iron ore and three hundred tons of cork

The convoy was sighted approximately 300 nautical miles (560 km) to the west of Cape Finisterre early in the morning of 15 June 1942 by U-552, under Kapitänleutnant Erich Topp. Following a preliminary skirmish around 0400 hrs, Topp fired three torpedoes at the convoy between 0432 and 0434 hrs. City of Oxford was the second of two ships to be struck ; the first being SS Thurso.

According to an oral history recounted by Cpt. "Johnnie" Walker, following Thurso's sinking:

Darkness had time to close in tightly again before the SS City of Oxford shuddered to a standstill under the impact of an internal explosion caused when the torpedo pierced her hull and detonated inside a cargo hold. She sank while the ships following her were altering course round her heavily listing hulk.

One crew member was lost in the sinking, the 43 survivors were picked up by the rescue ship Copeland before being transferred to the corvette HMS Marigold, and then the Bittern-class sloop HMS Stork and landed at Liverpool.
