= Hubert Hudson =

British navigating officer and polar explorer (1886–1942)

Hubert Taylor Hudson
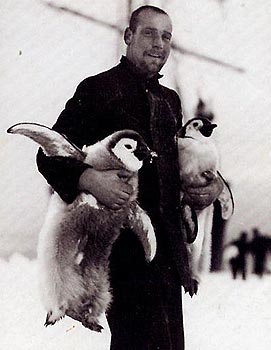
- Hubert Hudson with young emperor penguins
- Born: 17 September 1886; London, England
- Died: 15 June 1942 (aged 55)

Huberht Taylor Hudson, RD (17 September 1886 – 15 June 1942), commonly known as Hubert Hudson instead of by his actual first name (an Old English version of the name), was a navigating officer in the British Royal Navy, who took part in the Imperial Trans-Antarctic Expedition, led by Ernest Shackleton, to Antarctica.

Hudson joined the expedition whilst a 'mate' in the Royal Navy. He earned the nickname of 'Buddha', when the rest of the crew tricked him into dressing-up in little more than a bedsheet for a 'fancy dress' party on the whaling station at South Georgia. Hudson was described as a "young dandy" who was somewhat self-centered and a poor listener, "simple and a little irritating....a little impressed with his own good looks, but really not too sure of himself".

During the expedition, Hudson was famed for his ability to catch penguins, which the crew ate, whilst trapped on the ice. Hudson would be put in charge of steering the tiller of one of the lifeboats, the Stancomb Wills, once the crew escaped from the pack ice, eventually landing on Elephant Island. Towards the end of the expedition, Hudson suffered a severe breakdown of mental morale, possibly due to a massive boil that he developed on his buttocks. His illness caused Frank Wild, the second-in-command, a lot of worry that he would not survive. Hudson pulled through and eventually recovered his health.

Upon return from the expedition, Hudson took part in the First World War, serving on Q-ships. He later also took part in the Second World War as a Royal Navy Reserve Convoy Commodore. Hudson was killed on 15 June 1942 while in Convoy HG 84 when his ship, the merchant vessel Pelayo, was torpedoed by U-552.
