= William MacDonald (footballer) =

Scottish footballer

Personal information
- Full name: William Sinclair MacDonald
- Date of birth: 28 August 1911
- Place of birth: Wick, Scotland
- Date of death: 1978 (aged 66–67)
- Place of death: Caithness, Scotland
- Position: Wing half

Senior career*
Years	Team	Apps	(Gls)
1934–1936	Edinburgh City	20	(1)
1936–1939	Queen's Park	49	(5)

International career
1937–1939	Scotland Amateurs	4	(0)
- * Club domestic league appearances and goals

William Sinclair MacDonald MBE, DSC (28 August 1911 – 1978) was a Scottish amateur football wing half who played in the Scottish League for Queen's Park and Edinburgh City. He was capped by Scotland at amateur level.

== Personal life ==
MacDonald served as a lieutenant in the Royal Naval Volunteer Reserve during the Second World War and commanded HMS Marigold and HMS Borage. Under his command, German U-boat U-433 was sunk by HMS Marigold on 16 November 1941, for which he was mentioned in dispatches. MacDonald was awarded the Distinguished Service Cross in June 1942 and an MBE in March 1943.
