= SS Lancing =

Shipwreck in Dare County, North Carolina

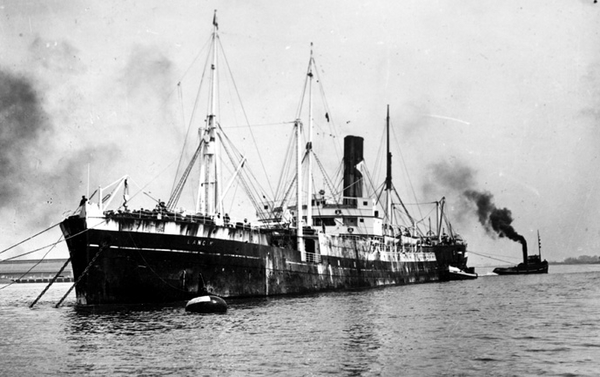

History
- Name: Knight Errant (1898-14); Rio Tiete (1914-15); Omsk (1915-21); Calanda (1921-1922); Flackwell (1922-25); Lancing (1925-42)
- Owner: Knight Steamship Company, Liverpool (1898-1913); European & Brazilian Shipping Company, London (1913-15); Dobroflot, Russia (1915-17); Shipping Controller, UK (1917-21); London & Foreign Maritime Trading Company, London (1921); London Steamship & Trading Corporation (1921-23); D L Flack & Son, London (1923-25); Hvalfanger A/S Globus, Larvik (1925-42)
- Builder: Charles Connell and Company, Scotstoun
- Yard number: 240
- Launched: 11 December 1897
- Completed: 1898
- Fate: Sunk on 7 April 1942

General characteristics
- Type: Cargo ship; Converted to whale factory ship in 1925
- Tonnage: As built: 7,464 GRT; 4,747 NRT; After conversion: 7,866 GRT; 4,561 NRT
- Length: 470 ft (143.26 m)
- Beam: 77 ft 3 in (23.55 m)
- Depth: 31 ft (9.45 m)
- Propulsion: Steam triple expansion engine; 549 nhp; 2,500 ihp
- Lancing (shipwreck)
- U.S. National Register of Historic Places
- Location: Address Restricted, near Buxton, North Carolina
- Built: 1898
- Architectural style: Converted Whale Factory Ship
- MPS: World War II Shipwrecks along the East Coast and Gulf of Mexico
- NRHP reference No.: 13000451
- Added to NRHP: 26 June 2013

SS Lancing was a Norwegian whale factory ship, originally the British merchant ship Knight Errant. The ship passed through a number of owners, being named Rio Tiete, Omsk, Calanda, and Flackwell at different stages in her career. She was sunk off Cape Hatteras on 7 April 1942 by the German submarine U-552.

== Construction and early career ==
Knight Errant was built by Charles Connell and Company, Scotstoun and launched on 11 December 1897, being completed the following year. She entered service with Knight Steamship Company, Liverpool and sailed for them until being sold in 1913 to the European & Brazilian Shipping Company, of London. The ship was renamed Rio Tiete in 1914 and spent part of the First World War under the British flag. She was sold to Dobroflot in 1915, the Russian Volunteer Fleet Association, and was renamed Omsk. With the Russian Revolution in 1917 and the Russian exit from the war, Omsk was seized by the British Shipping Controller and operated on their behalf by the Royal Mail Steam Packet Company. She was then sold on again, in 1921, to the London & Foreign Maritime Trading Company, and then to the London Steamship & Trading Corporation. By now renamed Calanda, she spent only a few years on this service, and was sold once more to D L Flack & Son, London in 1923, being renamed Flackwell. Her final sale took place in 1925, when she was acquired by the Norwegian firm of Hvalfanger A/S Globus. They undertook her conversion to a whale factory ship and assigned her to be operated by Melsom & Melsom, Larvik under the name Lancing.

== Sinking ==
In early April 1942, Lancing was sailing from Curaçao to New York City, under the command of Master Bjerkholt, with a cargo of 8,900 tons of fuel oil. She was sighted off Cape Hatteras on 7 April by U-552, under Erich Topp. Lancing was hit with a single torpedo at 10:52, killing a single crewman. The remainder of the crew abandoned ship as the Lancing sank off Buxton, Dare County, North Carolina. They were rescued by the American tanker SS Pan Rhode Island.

The Lancing had a bunker capacity of 16,279 bbl for heavy fuel oil. During 2011 to 2013, the shipwreck was evaluated by the National Oceanic and Atmospheric Administration for pollution potential. The wreck of the Lancing was listed on the National Register of Historic Places in 2013.
