= German submarine U-2513 =

German World War II submarine

- USS U-2513 off Key West in October 1946

History

Germany
- Name: U-2513
- Ordered: 6 November 1943
- Builder: Blohm & Voss, Hamburg, Germany
- Yard number: 2513
- Laid down: 19 July 1944
- Launched: 14 September 1944
- Commissioned: 12 October 1944
- Fate: Surrendered on 9 May 1945

United States
- Name: U-2513
- Acquired: August 1945
- In service: September 1946
- Out of service: July 1949
- Fate: Sunk as target on 7 October 1951

General characteristics
- Class & type: Type XXI submarine
- Displacement: 1,621 t (1,595 long tons) surfaced; 1,819 t (1,790 long tons) submerged
- Length: 76.70 m (251 ft 8 in) (o/a); 60.50 m (198 ft 6 in) (p/h)
- Beam: 8 m (26 ft 3 in) (o/a); 5.3 m (17 ft 5 in) (p/h)
- Height: 11.30 m (37 ft 1 in)
- Draught: 6.32 m (20 ft 9 in)
- Installed power: 4,000 PS (2,900 kW; 3,900 shp) (diesel drive); 5,000 PS (3,700 kW; 4,900 shp) (standard electric drive); 226 PS (166 kW; 223 shp) (silent electric drive)
- Propulsion: Diesel/Electric; 2 × MAN M6V40/46KBB supercharged 6-cylinder diesel engines; 2 × SSW GU365/30 double-acting electric motors; 2 × SSW GV232/28 silent running electric motors
- Speed: Surfaced: 15.6 knots (28.9 km/h; 18.0 mph) (diesel); 17.9 knots (33.2 km/h; 20.6 mph) (electric); Submerged: 17.2 knots (31.9 km/h; 19.8 mph) (electric); 6.1 knots (11.3 km/h; 7.0 mph) (silent running motors)
- Range: 15,500 nmi (28,700 km; 17,800 mi) at 10 knots (19 km/h; 12 mph) surfaced; 340 nmi (630 km; 390 mi) at 5 knots (9.3 km/h; 5.8 mph) submerged
- Test depth: 280 m (920 ft)
- Complement: 57–60 crewmen
- Sensors & processing systems: Type F432 D2 Radar Transmitter; FuMB Ant 3 Bali Radar Detector
- Armament: 6 × bow torpedo tubes; 23 × 53.3 cm (21 in) torpedoes (or 17 × torpedoes and 12 × TMC mines); 4 × 2 cm (0.8 in) AA guns or; 4 × 3.7 cm (1.5 in) AA guns

Service record (Kriegsmarine)
- Part of: 31st U-boat Flotilla; 12 October 1944 – 1 April 1945; 11th U-boat Flotilla; 1 April – 8 May 1945
- Identification codes: M 46 136
- Commanders: Kptlt. Hans Bungards; 12 October 1944 – 26 April 1945; F.Kapt. Erich Topp; 27 April – 9 May 1945
- Operations: None
- Victories: None

German submarine U-2513 was a Type XXI U-boat of Nazi Germany's Kriegsmarine, that was operated by the United States Navy for several years after World War II.

== Design ==
Like all Type XXI U-boats, U-2513 had a displacement of 1,621 tonnes (1,595 long tons) when at the surface and 1,819 tonnes (1,790 long tons) while submerged. She had a total length of 76.70 m (251 ft 8 in) (o/a), a beam of 8 m (26 ft 3 in), and a draught of 6.32 m (20 ft 9 in). The submarine was powered by two MAN SE supercharged six-cylinder M6V40/46KBB diesel engines each providing 4,000 metric horsepower (2,900 kilowatts; 3,900 shaft horsepower), two Siemens-Schuckert GU365/30 double-acting electric motors each providing 5,000 PS (3,700 kW; 4,900 shp), and two Siemens-Schuckert silent running GV232/28 electric motors each providing 226 PS (166 kW; 223 shp).

The submarine had a maximum surface speed of 15.6 knots (28.9 km/h; 18.0 mph) and a submerged speed of 17.2 knots (31.9 km/h; 19.8 mph). When running on silent motors the boat could operate at a speed of 6.1 knots (11.3 km/h; 7.0 mph). When submerged, the boat could operate at 5 knots (9.3 km/h; 5.8 mph) for 340 nautical miles (630 km; 390 mi); when surfaced, she could travel 15,500 nautical miles (28,700 km; 17,800 mi) at 10 knots (19 km/h; 12 mph). U-2513 was fitted with six 53.3 cm (21.0 in) torpedo tubes in the bow and four 2 cm (0.79 in) C/30 anti-aircraft guns. She could carry twenty-three torpedoes or seventeen torpedoes and twelve mines. The complement was five officers and fifty-two men.

== Service history ==
=== Kriegsmarine ===
Her keel was laid down on 19 July 1944 by Blohm & Voss of Hamburg. She was commissioned on 12 October 1944 with Kapitänleutnant Hans Bungards in command. Bungards was relieved on 27 April 1945 by Fregattenkapitän Erich Topp, who commanded the boat for less than two weeks.

U-2513 conducted no war patrols. On 9 May 1945, Topp surrendered his command at Horten Naval Base, Norway. U-2513 was taken to Oslo on 18 May, then to Lishally, Northern Ireland, which she reached on 9 June. In August 1945, the U-boat was transferred to the United States.

=== United States Navy ===
A year later, August 1946, U-2513 began an extensive overhaul in Charleston, South Carolina, which was completed late in September. On 24 September, she departed Charleston and headed for Key West, Florida. The following day, she began six months of duty which included both evaluation tests of the U-boat's design and duty in conjunction with the development of submarine and antisubmarine tactics. The Greater Underwater Propulsion Power Program (GUPPY) would be initiated because of the results of these tests.

On 21 November 1946 President Harry S. Truman became the second American President (after Theodore Roosevelt) to travel on a submarine when he visited U-2513. The sub went 440 feet (130 m) below the surface with the President on board, and a demonstration was made to him of the German schnorchel (a specialized submarine snorkel).

On 15 March 1947, U-2513 headed north from Key West, Florida, bound for the New England coast, and arrived at Portsmouth, New Hampshire, on 22 March. She remained there until 8 September when she began six weeks of operations from Portsmouth and New London, Connecticut, under the auspices of the Commander, Submarines, Atlantic Fleet. She concluded that duty on 15 October and departed New London to return to Key West. U-2513 resumed her old duties at Key West five days later and continued them until the summer of 1949.

In mid-June 1949, the submarine moved from Key West north via Norfolk, Virginia, to Portsmouth, New Hampshire, where she was placed out of service in July 1949. She remained at Portsmouth until August 1951 at which time she returned to Key West. On 2 September 1951, the Chief of Naval Operations ordered that the boat be sunk by gunfire. U-2513 was sunk west of Key West, Florida during rocket tests by the destroyer USS Robert A. Owens on 7 October 1951.

The final resting place of U-2513 is about 23 nautical miles (43 km; 26 mi) northwest of the Dry Tortugas, 70 nautical miles (130 km; 81 mi) west of Key West) in about 213 feet (65 m) of water at 24°52.015′N 83°18.594′W. She is reachable only by divers experienced in decompression diving at that depth. The site is rarely dived on due to its depth and remote location.

== See also ==
- German submarine U-3008

== Bibliography ==
- Busch, Rainer; Röll, Hans-Joachim (1999). German U-boat commanders of World War II : a biographical dictionary. Translated by Brooks, Geoffrey. London, Annapolis, Md: Greenhill Books, Naval Institute Press. ISBN 1-55750-186-6.
- Busch, Rainer; Röll, Hans-Joachim (1999). Der U-Boot-Krieg, 1939-1945: Deutsche U-Boot-Verluste von September 1939 bis Mai 1945 [German U-boat losses from September 1939 to May 1945] (in German). Vol. IV. Hamburg, Berlin, Bonn: Mittler. ISBN 3-8132-0514-2.
- Gröner, Erich; Jung, Dieter; Maass, Martin (1991). U-boats and Mine Warfare Vessels. German Warships 1815–1945. Vol. 2. Translated by Thomas, Keith; Magowan, Rachel. London: Conway Maritime Press. ISBN 0-85177-593-4.
