= SS Nerissa (1926) =

Passenger and cargo steamer

History

United Kingdom
- Name: Nerissa
- Namesake: Shakespearean character of The Merchant of Venice
- Operator: New York, Newfoundland and Halifax Steamship Company, Limited
- Builder: William Hamilton & Co. Ltd., Port Glasgow
- Laid down: November 1925
- Launched: 31 March 1926
- Fate: Sunk on 30 April 1941

General characteristics
- Type: Passenger and cargo steamer
- Tonnage: 5,583 GRT
- Length: 349.5 ft (106.5 m)
- Beam: 54 ft (16 m)
- Draught: 20 ft 8 in (6.30 m)
- Depth: 33 ft (10 m)
- Propulsion: steam, 4 oil-fired boilers; 4-cylinder triple-expansion engine
- Speed: 17 knots (31 km/h; 20 mph) maximum
- Capacity: 163 first class; 66 second class; 197,430 cu ft (5,591 m^{3}) cargo capacity

SS Nerissa was a passenger and cargo steamer which was torpedoed and sunk on 30 April 1941 during World War II by the German submarine U-552 following 12 wartime voyages between Canada and Britain. She was the only transport carrying Canadian Army troops to be lost during World War II.

== History ==
Nerissa was the final ship built for the Bowring Brothers' "Red Cross Line" service between New York City, Halifax, Nova Scotia, and St. John's, Newfoundland. Due to the arduous winter conditions to be expected on her routes, Nerissa was designed with a strengthened hull to cope with ice floes and an icebreaker style sloping stern.

She was built in Port Glasgow by the shipbuilding company William Hamilton & Company Ltd in a remarkably short time; her owners only signed the contract for her construction on 3 November 1925, yet she was launched on 31 March 1926 in time for the 1926 sailing season. After preliminary trials she departed on her maiden voyage to New York on 5 June 1926.

The Red Cross Line was sold at the end of 1928 the line along with its three ships Nerissa, Rosalind, and Silvia, to Furness Withy.

The ships then became part of the Bermuda & West Indies Steamship Co. Ltd., and Nerissa continued on the New York, Halifax and St. John's route until 1931 when she was switched to the New York to Bermuda run and also made voyages to Trinidad and Demerara.

== Wartime service ==
For the first seven months of the war, Nerissa had provided passenger and freight services out of New York City to Bermuda and ports in the Caribbean Sea. In April 1940, she was pressed into wartime service for the transport of troops and critical war materials. In July 1940, in a Liverpool shipyard, Nerissa was modified as an auxiliary transport with accommodation for 250 men and was fitted with a 4-inch (100 mm) gun and a Bofors gun, with gun crews drawn from the Maritime Regiment of the Royal Artillery. Due to her capability to steam at a higher speed than the usual 9 knots (17 km/h; 10 mph) of escorted convoys, Nerissa often sailed alone, since she was considered capable of outrunning enemy submarines.

On her fourth wartime crossing, Nerissa departed Liverpool on 7 September 1940, in convoy OB 210. On 10 September, the convoy reached the perimeter of the Western Approaches, where the Royal Navy escorts broke off and escorted an incoming convoy to Liverpool. Nerissa then sailed independently for Halifax, with 34 evacuated children under the Children's Overseas Reception Board, their final destination was British Columbia.

By April 1941 Nerissa had made 12 wartime crossings of the North Atlantic. Her final crossing began on 21 April 1941 at Halifax, Nova Scotia. The ship's master was the 57-year-old Gilbert Ratcliffe Watson. He had just survived his fourth sinking during two world wars when he joined Nerissa as her new master in August 1940. The Officer Commanding all embarked Allied troops (O.C. Troops) was 47-year-old Lieutenant Colonel Kenneth Charles Burness of the Princess Patricia's Canadian Light Infantry.

A complement of 291 persons were embarked at Pier 21 for the crossing:

- 105 Merchant Navy crew members;
- 16 Royal Canadian Navy (4 officers and 12 Ordinary Telegraphists);
- 108 Canadian Army personnel from logistics, artillery, medical, infantry, armoured, signals, engineers and provost corps and regiments;
- 5 Royal Navy (Including 2 DEMS gunners for the 4-inch Breech Loading MK VII naval gun);
- 12 Royal Air Force - A Wing Commander and staff of 11 were returning to the United Kingdom after serving as Officer Commanding Troops (OC Troops) in various troopships;
- 7 British Army - An officer of the 11th Hussars and 6 Royal Artillery Maritime Regiment gunners for the Bofors 40 mm anti-aircraft gun;
- 14 Air Transport Auxiliary (ATA) American pilots;
- 4 Norwegian Army Air Service personnel who had completed training at the "Little Norway" base on Toronto Island, and were being transferred to air force headquarters in London; and
- 20 civilians.

The 20 civilians included Canada's Agriculture Commissioner in London and Alfred Baldwin Raper, an emissary of the British government who was returning from a speaking tour of the neutral United States.

Nerissa sailed from Halifax at 7:15 AM local time 21 April 1941 in company with ships of Convoy HX 122. Nerissa maintained position in the eastbound convoy for about three hours before sailing independently northwards for St. John's, Newfoundland. Nerissa arrived in St. John's at about 6:00 AM local time on 23 April. Nerissa did not take on or deliver any passengers or cargo in St. John's. Why she stopped in St. John's on route to Liverpool is not known. Passengers were allowed to explore the town. Early on 24 April, the ship sailed independently from St. John's bound for Liverpool.

=== Sinking ===
In the early morning hours of 30 April, Nerissa passed north of the convoy meeting area 56°N 15°W where the Western Approaches Royal Navy escorts normally broke off from outbound convoys and met incoming convoys. Nerissa had entered the U-boat operational area Großquadrate AM. (The Kriegsmarine used a grid system rather than latitude and longitude in the short encrypted signals sent to and from U-boats. During the Battle of the Atlantic, 262 Allied ships were sunk and 35 were seriously damaged by U-boats operating in the AM quadrant.)

At about 08:15 GMT, the first of four RAF Coastal Command (224 Squadron) Lockheed Hudson aircraft arrived overhead and provided about five hours of escort protection starting at 56°59'N 13°48'W. The second, third and fourth RAF Coastal Command patrol aircraft provided overhead protection to Nerissa until 19:15 (ending at 56°16'N 11°00'W). At 21:40 GMT, Erich Topp, the commander of the surfaced German submarine U-552, sighted a ship approaching from the northwest. For almost two hours, Topp stalked the zigzagging ship and adjusted his torpedo firing solution accordingly. Finally, Topp saw a phosphorescent glow on the sea and decided that 1,000 metres (1,100 yd) was as close as he should approach his target, and he fired a fan of three torpedoes "because of unsure shooting data". U-552 log records that one of the three torpedoes "hit astern" at 00:27 Berlin Time (GMT+2). About six minutes later, Topp closed in on the already stricken ship and fired a fourth torpedo into Nerissa's aft starboard side while her crew and passengers were launching lifeboats.

=== Survival and rescue ===
The First Radio Officer was on duty when the first torpedo hit. Both the Second and Third Radio Officers rushed to the wireless cabin. They continually resent the distress signal with the ship's SOS position. All three men perished with their sinking ship.

When Nerissa sank about 2,200 metres (7,200 ft) to the ocean floor, the four Carley floats on the sun deck floated free. Only six of her eight lifeboats escaped her grip: No. 1 capsized; No. 5 capsized; No. 6 upright but flooded; No. 7 upright and two other capsized lifeboats. These final two capsized lifeboats probably broke free as Nerissa sank beneath the surface. Two of her four large rafts also floated free off the wreck.

At 01:50 GMT 1 May, RAF Coastal Command (502 Squadron) Armstrong Whitworth Whitney patrol aircraft departed from RAF Lamavady, near Londonderry, in search of Nerissa. The aircraft arrived at the SOS position at 02:54 GMT and dropped flares and saw that the destroyer Veteran was already in the area. The aircraft commenced an anti-submarine search. It was not until three hours later, at 05:42, that the aircraft sighted "six lifeboats and six rafts" which had been carried north by the Gulf Stream into its search area. The aircraft flew south to Veteran (05:50) and visually signaled "Survivors of torpedoed ship 13 miles to north'".

A position error in Nerissa's repeated distress signals likely caused a delay of more than three hours in the rescue of the remaining survivors and further loss of life. The evidence suggests that the ship's Dead Reckoning (DR) plot maintained in the wireless cabin had not been updated after the ship's position was more accurately established by the Officer of the Watch's celestial fix at 21:25 GMT. As a result, the SOS position included in the repeated transmitted distress message was incorrect by about 15.5 nautical miles (28.7 km; 17.8 mi) northwest of the actual sunk position. At about 08:00 GMT, Veteran was alongside the boats and rafts of the remaining survivors. Veteran did not stop or put down lifeboats for fear of attack. She moved as slow as possible, put a scramble net down and urged survivors to climb aboard. However, most Nerissa survivors were so cold and wasted that they had to be helped up the scramble nets. At 08:15 all remaining 84 survivors were picked up at position 56°15'N 10°20'W by Veteran. The survivors had spent ten hours in or clinging to lifeboats, and rafts before being rescued.

HMS Hurricane provided anti-submarine support while Veteran focused on rescuing the Nerissa survivors. Hurricane had difficulty in accommodating any of the Nerissa survivors given that she had not yet disembarked the 452 City of Nagpur and 3 Henri Mory survivors being cared for below decks. At about 18:30 GMT, the 84 Nerissa survivors were transferred to HMS Kingcup, a Flower-class corvette, which took them to Londonderry. The sinking of Nerissa resulted in 207 casualties. This was the third largest loss of life for a ship sunk by U-boats in the approaches to the British Isles.

- 66 British merchant navy;
- 15 Canadian merchant navy;
- 10 Royal Canadian Navy;
- 73 Canadian Army;
- 4 Royal Navy;
- 8 Royal Air Force;
- 3 Norwegian Army Air Service;
- 11 Air Transport Auxiliary (ATA) American ferry pilots; and
- 17 civilian passengers (9 Canadian, 7 British and 1 Australian).

== See also ==
- SS Florizel, another Red Cross Line ship wrecked during wartime
