= RFA Brown Ranger =

Ranger-class support tanker of the British Royal Fleet

- Brown Ranger (A169)

History

United Kingdom
- Name: Brown Ranger
- Ordered: 28 August 1939
- Builder: Harland & Wolff
- Yard number: 1048
- Laid down: 28 October 1939
- Launched: 12 December 1940
- Completed: 11 April 1941
- Commissioned: 10 April 1941
- Decommissioned: November 1974; Laid up at Devonport.
- Stricken: 1975
- Identification: IMO number: 5053961
- Honours and awards: North Africa 1942. Korea 1950.
- Fate: Demolition began at Gijón, 28 May 1975

General characteristics
- Class & type: Ranger-class fleet support tanker
- Displacement: 6,630 long tons (6,736 t) full load
- Length: 365 ft 10 in (111.51 m) oa; 349 ft 6 in (106.53 m) pp
- Beam: 47.0 ft (14.3 m)
- Draught: 20.0 ft (6.1 m)
- Propulsion: 1 × 6-cylinder B&W diesel; 3,500 shp (2,600 kW); 1 shaft
- Speed: 12 kn (14 mph; 22 km/h)

RFA Brown Ranger (A169) was a Ranger-class fleet support tanker of the Royal Fleet Auxiliary. During the Second World War she played an important role in the Malta Convoys and in Pacific operations. From 24 to 30 September 1941 Brown Ranger was deployed as part of Force S in Operation Halberd, refuelling the ships of convoy WS 11X, en route from the Clyde to Malta via Gibraltar. Brown Ranger deployed again from Gibraltar on 16 November 1941 as part of Operation Chieftain, returning on 18 November. On 11 June 1942 she was part of Force Y in Operation Harpoon, supplying the escorts of convoy WS 19Z.

She also saw service during the Korean War, from 25 June 1950 to 27 July 1953, along with 18 other Royal Fleet Auxiliary vessels and was awarded the battle honour Korea 1950–52.

She was scrapped at Gijón on 28 May 1975.
