= German submarine U-3010 =

German World War II submarine

History

Nazi Germany
- Name: U-3010
- Ordered: 6 November 1943
- Builder: DeSchiMAG AG Weser, Bremen
- Yard number: 1169
- Laid down: 13 July 1944
- Launched: 10 October 1944
- Commissioned: 11 November 1944
- Fate: Scuttled on 3 May 1945

General characteristics
- Class & type: Type XXI submarine
- Displacement: 1,621 long tons (1,647 t) surfaced; 1,819 long tons (1,848 t) submerged
- Length: 76.70 m (251 ft 8 in) (o/a)
- Beam: 8 m (26 ft 3 in)
- Height: 11.30 m (37 ft 1 in)
- Draught: 6.32 m (20 ft 9 in)
- Propulsion: Diesel-electric; Diesel engines, 4,400 PS (3,236 kW; 4,340 shp); Electric motors, 4,400 PS (3,236 kW; 4,340 shp)
- Speed: 15.6 knots (28.9 km/h; 18.0 mph) surfaced; 17.2 knots (31.9 km/h; 19.8 mph) submerged
- Range: 15,500 nmi (28,700 km; 17,800 mi) at 10 knots (19 km/h; 12 mph) surfaced; 550 km (300 nmi) at 5 knots (9.3 km/h; 5.8 mph) submerged
- Test depth: 240 m (790 ft)240–280 m (790–920 ft)
- Complement: 5 officers, 52 enlisted
- Sensors & processing systems: Type F432 D2 Radar Transmitter; FuMB Ant 3 Bali Radar Detector
- Armament: 6 × 53.3 cm (21 in) torpedo tubes; 4 × 2 cm (0.79 in) C/30 AA guns; 12 TMC mines

Service record
- Part of: 4th U-boat Flotilla; 11 November 1944 – 3 May 1945
- Identification codes: M 46 477
- Commanders: Oblt.z.S. Eberhard Ebert; 11 November 1944 – 8 March 1945; F.Kapt. Erich Topp; 9 March – 26 April 1945
- Operations: None
- Victories: None

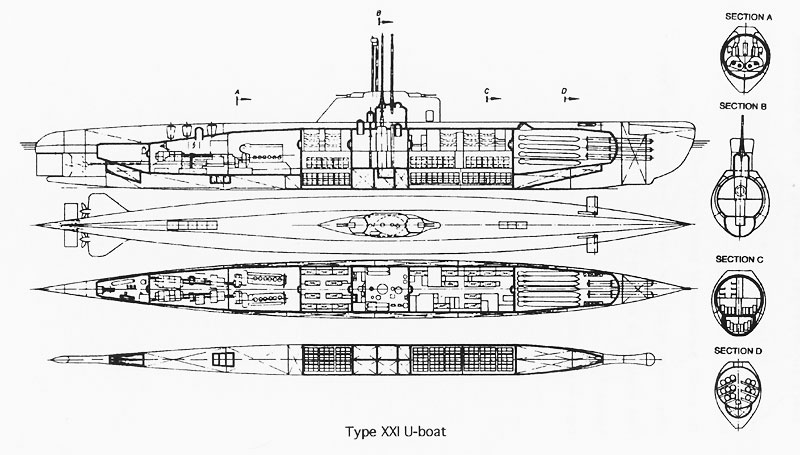
Type XXI submarine diagram.

German submarine U-3010 was a Type XXI U-boat of Nazi Germany's Kriegsmarine.

Her keel was laid down on 13 July 1944 by DeSchiMAG AG Weser of Bremen. She was commissioned on 11 November 1944 with Oberleutnant zur See Eberhard Ebert in command. Ebert handed over to Fregattenkapitän Erich Topp (Knight's Cross) on 9 March 1945, who commanded the boat until 26 April 1945. U-3010 conducted no war patrols. On 3 May 1945, she was scuttled at Kiel to prevent her from falling into Allied hands. The wreck was subsequently broken up.

== Design ==
Like all Type XXI U-boats, U-3010 had a displacement of 1,621 tonnes (1,595 long tons) when at the surface and 1,819 tonnes (1,790 long tons) while submerged. She had a total length of 76.70 m (251 ft 8 in), a beam of 8 m (26 ft 3 in), and a draught of 6.32 m (20 ft 9 in). The submarine was powered by two MAN SE supercharged six-cylinder M6V40/46KBB diesel engines each providing 4,000 metric horsepower (2,900 kilowatts; 3,900 shaft horsepower), two Siemens-Schuckert GU365/30 double-acting electric motors each providing 5,000 PS (3,700 kW; 4,900 shp), and two Siemens-Schuckert silent running GV232/28 electric motors each providing 226 PS (166 kW; 223 shp).

The submarine had a maximum surface speed of 15.6 knots (28.9 km/h; 18.0 mph) and a submerged speed of 17.2 knots (31.9 km/h; 19.8 mph). When running on silent motors the boat could operate at a speed of 6.1 knots (11.3 km/h; 7.0 mph). When submerged, the boat could operate at 5 knots (9.3 km/h; 5.8 mph) for 340 nautical miles (630 km; 390 mi); when surfaced, she could travel 15,500 nautical miles (28,700 km; 17,800 mi) at 10 knots (19 km/h; 12 mph). U-3010 was fitted with six 53.3 cm (21.0 in) torpedo tubes in the bow and four 2 cm (0.79 in) C/30 anti-aircraft guns. She could carry twenty-three torpedoes or seventeen torpedoes and twelve mines. The complement was five officers and fifty-two men.

== Bibliography ==
- Busch, Rainer; Röll, Hans-Joachim (1999). German U-boat commanders of World War II : a biographical dictionary. Translated by Brooks, Geoffrey. London, Annapolis, Md: Greenhill Books, Naval Institute Press. ISBN 1-55750-186-6.
- Busch, Rainer; Röll, Hans-Joachim (1999). Der U-Boot-Krieg, 1939-1945: Deutsche U-Boot-Verluste von September 1939 bis Mai 1945 [German U-boat losses from September 1939 to May 1945] (in German). Vol. IV. Hamburg, Berlin, Bonn: Mittler. ISBN 3-8132-0514-2.
- Gröner, Erich; Jung, Dieter; Maass, Martin (1991). U-boats and Mine Warfare Vessels. German Warships 1815–1945. Vol. 2. Translated by Thomas, Keith; Magowan, Rachel. London: Conway Maritime Press. ISBN 0-85177-593-4.
