= SS Thurso =

Coordinates: 43°41′N 18°2′W

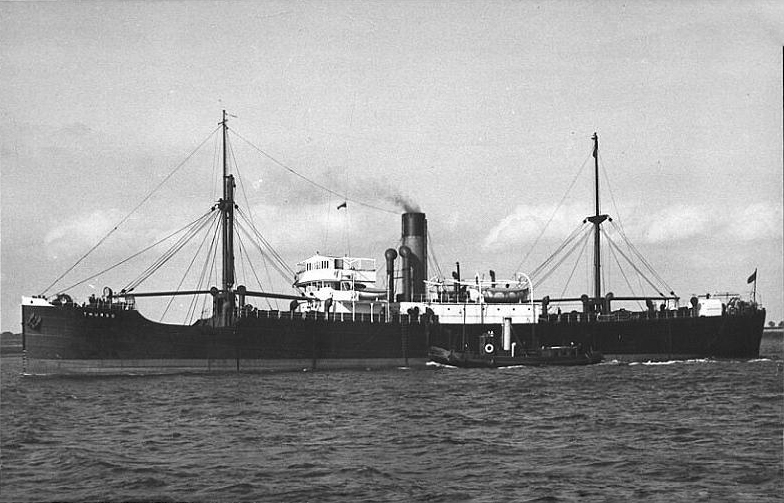
- SS Thurso

History

United Kingdom
- Name: SS Thurso
- Owner: Ellerman's Wilson Line
- Builder: S.P. Austin & Son Ltd, Sunderland
- Yard number: 304
- Launched: 24 September 1919
- Completed: 1919
- Renamed: Launched as War Bramble; Completed as Thurso
- Homeport: Hull
- Identification: Official Number: 144022
- Fate: Sunk on 15 June 1942

General characteristics
- Tonnage: 2,436 GRT
- Length: 303 ft 2 in (92.4 m)
- Beam: 43 ft (13.1 m)
- Draught: 20 ft 8 in (6.3 m)
- Propulsion: Triple-expansion engines; 266 n.h.p.
- Speed: 9 knots (17 km/h; 10 mph)
- Crew: 36

SS Thurso was a cargo steamship operated by Ellerman's Wilson Line. Thurso was built in 1919 by S. P. Austin & Sons in Sunderland as the War Bramble for the Shipping Controller. Measuring 2,436 gross register tons, the ship had a speed of 9 knots (17 km/h; 10 mph). She was sold to Ellerman Lines while still under construction and remained with the company until lost during the Second World War.

== Last voyage ==
Under Master William Waldie, Thurso was part of Convoy HG 84 which had left Lisbon for Liverpool, and called at Gibraltar on 9 June to join with the 36th Escort Group under the command of Captain "Johnnie" Walker.

SS Thurso left Gibraltar on the 9th June about 1800, taking up position No. 63 in convoy H.G.84. It was a fine night, with good visibility; the wind was south easterly, force 2 and there was a slight swell after things had quietened down.

Thurso carried 850 tons of cork, general cargo, and 1,500 bags of mail for German prisoners of war in Britain. She had a crew of 36 and six gunners.

She was armed with a 4", .12 pdr., 2 Hotchkiss, 2 twin marlins, 2 strip Lewis guns, P.A.Cs. and kites. The Confidential books, which were also in a weighted bag in the wireless room went down with the ship. Degaussing was on.

At 00.58 and 00.59 hours on 15 June 1942 the U-552, commanded by Kapitänleutnant Erich Topp attacked convoy HG84 sinking three ships, the Etrib, Pelayo and Slemdal.

We had received no warning of submarines being in the vicinity and consequently did not know that danger was imminent until 0100 on June 15th when the 2nd officer reported that the Norwegian tanker Slemdal, which was in position 62, had been torpedoed on the starboard side. He had actually seen the flash from this torpedo. I immediately went on to the bridge, I stayed for a short while, watching the snowflakes being fired. I understand that the Etrib was torpedoed shortly before the Slemdal, but I knew nothing of this and nobody appears to have seen anything.

The convoy was attacked again approximately 300 nautical miles to the west of Cape Finisterre early in the morning of 15 June 1942 by U-552. Following a preliminary skirmish Topp fired three torpedoes at the convoy between 0432 and 0434 hrs. Thurso was sailing in the middle, and was one of two ships hit and sunk; the other being the SS City of Oxford.

According to an oral history recounted by Cpt. "Johnnie" Walker, the Thurso was the first to be struck by torpedoes:

the SS Thurso, in the middle of the convoy, literally exploded into fragments and for a moment seemed to disintegrate into a white, blazing ball of fire.

From Captain Waldie's report:

At 0420 when in position 430 41' N. 18' 02' W., there was a loud explosion right aft and a flash followed by a stream of water came over the bridge from aft. The propeller was evidently blown off as the engineer told me afterwards that the engines raced violently before he could stop them. The torpedo struck aft a little on the starboard quarter, and as the crew’s accommodation was aft the thirteen casualties probably occurred in the crew’s quarters, which were completely shattered. The after gun platform was blown across the crew's accommodation companion hatch and had sealed it up, so there were no other means of escape.

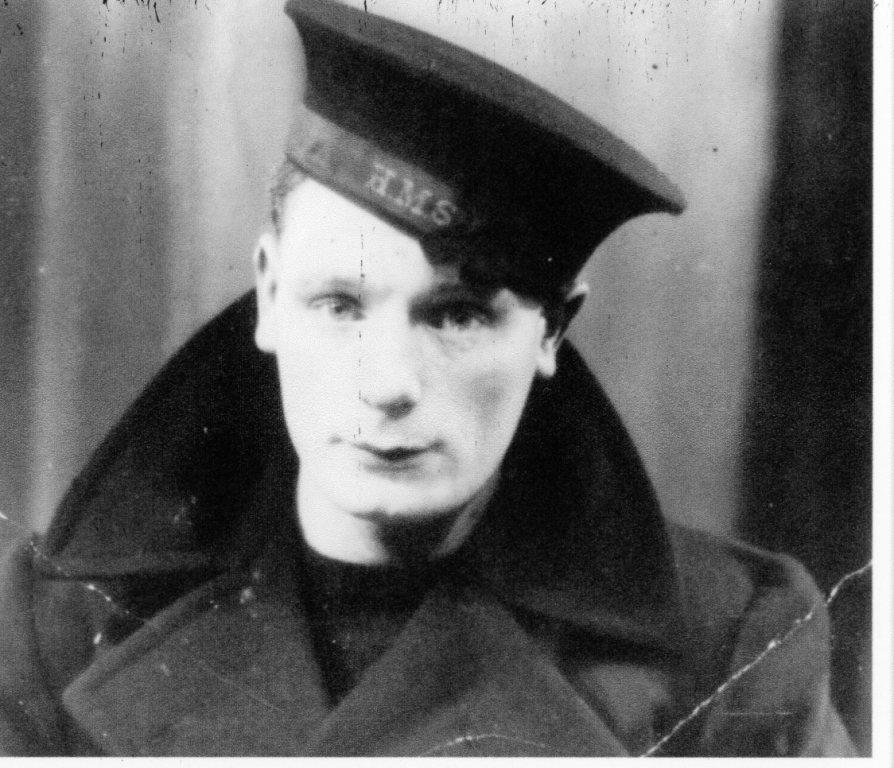
DEMS Gunner/PO Thomas Hagon DSM

The ship settled gradually by the stern, so the chief officer was ordered to get away the lifeboats. The ship was rapidly taking up a perpendicular position and we abandoned her at 0440. I got into the lifeboat and pulled away clear and saw that the damage to the ships side was considerable. At 0600 the ship finally sank by the stern & at 0620 the survivors, including the two injured gunners were picked up by HMS Marigold & the casualties were immediately given medical attention.

Two gunners were on watch at the time at the 4" one of whom, Nevard, was seriously injured by the blast from the explosion and had his leg broken in two places. Two of the other gunners, Langridge and Dowling, carried the injured man along the deck and up onto the boat-deck and placed him into a lifeboat and were undoubtedly responsible for the saving of Gunner Nevard's life. The gun layer Hagon, who was suffering from internal injuries, managed to crawl unaided along to the boat-deck and into a boat, where he collapsed.

== Losses ==
Thirteen of Thurso's crew of 42 were lost. The master, Captain Waldie, 22 crew members and the six gunners survived to be picked up by the corvette HMS Marigold and were landed at Greenock. Those men lost were listed on panels 107–108 of the Tower Hill Memorial that commemorates men and women of the Merchant Navy and Fishing Fleets who died in both World Wars and who have no known grave. It stands on the south side of the garden of Trinity Square, London, close to The Tower of London.

== Memorials ==
A sailor on board an escort ship wrote:

We had great respect for the Merchant seamen. I think they were underestimated, especially now by the British public today, because they talk about the Battle of Britain. Granted the pilots did a marvellous, marvellous job, but when you stop and think, how did they get the fuel across to fly those planes, it was the Merchant seamen.....And, honestly, I think they're the bravest men out, the Merchant Navy.

Admiral Lord Mountevans wrote after the war:

Those of us who have escorted convoys in either of the great wars can never forget the days and especially the nights spent in company with those slow-moving squadron of iron tramps - the wisps of smoke from their funnels, the phosphorescent wakes, the metallic clang of iron doors at the end of the night watches which told us that the Merchant Service firemen were coming up after four hours in the heated engine rooms, or boiler rooms, where they had run the gauntlet of torpedo or mine for perhaps half the years of the war. I remember so often thinking that those in the engine rooms, if they were torpedoed, would probably be drowned before they reached the engine room steps

Historian John Keegan wrote:

The 30,000 men of the British Merchant Navy who fell victim to the U-boats between 1939 and 1945, the majority drowned or killed by exposure on the cruel North Atlantic sea, were quite as certainly front-line warriors as the guardsmen and fighter pilots to whom they ferried the necessities of combat. Neither they nor their American, Dutch, Norwegian or Greek fellow mariners wore uniform and few have any memorial. They stood nevertheless between the Wehrmacht and the domination of the world.
