= Operation Chieftain =

Operation Chieftain was a Royal Navy operation during the Second World War.

Designed to support Operation Crusader, a decoy convoy, GM 3, was assembled, in an attempt to divert Axis aircraft away from the land battle. Five merchantmen, the oiler Brown Ranger, a sloop, a destroyer, and three corvettes left Gibraltar on 16 November 1941. The freighters were to turn back after dark and return independently while the escort conducted a two day anti-submarine sweep.

One corvette had engine trouble, sailed late and sank a German U-boat. Force K contributed to the deception by sailing westwards from Malta to simulate a rendezvous with GM 3, then reversing course overnight.

A second diversion force, as Operation Landmark, left Malta early on 21 November, feigning a voyage to Alexandria to escort four merchant ships. For added verisimilitude, the battle squadron at Alexandria sailed as if to meet the ships from Malta.

B-Dienst (Observation Service) learnt from British naval signals Force K was at sea, so an Italian convoy and escorts were ordered to port rather than risk battle.

== Sources ==
- Woodman, R. (2003). Malta Convoys 1940–1943 (pbk. ed.). London: John Murray. ISBN 978-0-7195-6408-6.
