= German submarine U-437 =

German World War II submarine

History

Nazi Germany
- Name: U-437
- Ordered: 16 October 1939
- Builder: Schichau-Werke, Danzig
- Yard number: 1479
- Laid down: 16 April 1940
- Launched: 26 July 1941
- Commissioned: 25 October 1941
- Fate: Damaged by British bombs in Norway on 4 October 1944; Stricken on 5 October 1944; Broken up in 1946

General characteristics
- Class & type: Type VIIC submarine
- Displacement: 769 tonnes (757 long tons) surfaced; 871 t (857 long tons) submerged
- Length: 67.10 m (220 ft 2 in) o/a; 50.50 m (165 ft 8 in) pressure hull
- Beam: 6.20 m (20 ft 4 in) o/a; 4.70 m (15 ft 5 in) pressure hull
- Height: 9.60 m (31 ft 6 in)
- Draught: 4.74 m (15 ft 7 in)
- Installed power: 2,800–3,200 PS (2,100–2,400 kW; 2,800–3,200 bhp) (diesels); 750 PS (550 kW; 740 shp) (electric)
- Propulsion: 2 shafts; 2 × diesel engines; 2 × electric motors
- Speed: 17.7 knots (32.8 km/h; 20.4 mph) surfaced; 7.6 knots (14.1 km/h; 8.7 mph) submerged
- Range: 8,500 nmi (15,700 km; 9,800 mi) at 10 knots (19 km/h; 12 mph) surfaced; 80 nmi (150 km; 92 mi) at 4 knots (7.4 km/h; 4.6 mph) submerged
- Test depth: 230 m (750 ft); Crush depth: 250–295 m (820–968 ft)
- Complement: 4 officers, 40–56 enlisted
- Armament: 5 × 53.3 cm (21 in) torpedo tubes (four bow, one stern); 14 × torpedoes; 1 × 8.8 cm (3.46 in) deck gun (220 rounds); 1 x 2 cm (0.79 in) C/30 AA gun

Service record
- Part of: 6th U-boat Flotilla; 25 October 1941 – 5 October 1944
- Identification codes: M 36 400
- Commanders: Kptlt. Werner-Karl Schultz; 25 October 1941 – 20 December 1942; Kptlt. Hermann Lanby; 21 December 1942 – 5 October 1944
- Operations: 11 patrols: 1st patrol: 4 – 16 April 1942; 2nd patrol: 29 April – 18 May 1942; 3rd patrol: 6 June – 12 August 1942; 4th patrol: 17 September – 15 November 1942; 5th patrol: 4 February – 5 March 1943; 6th patrol: 26 – 30 April 1943; 7th patrol; a. 24 – 25 July 1943; b. 1 – 3 August 1943; c. 18 – 19 September 1943; d. 23 – 25 September 1943; e. 26 September – 19 November 1943; 8th patrol: a. 20 – 22 January 1943; b. 29 – 31 January 1944; c. 2 February – 3 April 1944; 9th patrol: 6 – 15 June 1944; 10th patrol: 9 – 13 August 1944; 11th patrol: 23 August – 21 September 1944
- Victories: None

German submarine U-437 was a Type VIIC U-boat of Nazi Germany's Kriegsmarine during World War II. She carried out eleven patrols, but sank no ships. She was a member of sixteen wolfpacks. She was damaged by British bombs in Norway on 4 October 1944 and stricken; she was broken up in 1946.

== Design ==
German Type VIIC submarines were preceded by the shorter Type VIIB submarines. U-437 had a displacement of 769 tonnes (757 long tons) when at the surface and 871 tonnes (857 long tons) while submerged. She had a total length of 67.10 m (220 ft 2 in), a pressure hull length of 50.50 m (165 ft 8 in), a beam of 6.20 m (20 ft 4 in), a height of 9.60 m (31 ft 6 in), and a draught of 4.74 m (15 ft 7 in). The submarine was powered by two Germaniawerft F46 four-stroke, six-cylinder supercharged diesel engines producing a total of 2,800 to 3,200 metric horsepower (2,060 to 2,350 kW; 2,760 to 3,160 shp) for use while surfaced, two AEG GU 460/8–27 double-acting electric motors producing a total of 750 metric horsepower (550 kW; 740 shp) for use while submerged. She had two shafts and two 1.23 m (4 ft) propellers. The boat was capable of operating at depths of up to 230 metres (750 ft).

The submarine had a maximum surface speed of 17.7 knots (32.8 km/h; 20.4 mph) and a maximum submerged speed of 7.6 knots (14.1 km/h; 8.7 mph). When submerged, the boat could operate for 80 nautical miles (150 km; 92 mi) at 4 knots (7.4 km/h; 4.6 mph); when surfaced, she could travel 8,500 nautical miles (15,700 km; 9,800 mi) at 10 knots (19 km/h; 12 mph). U-437 was fitted with five 53.3 cm (21 in) torpedo tubes (four fitted at the bow and one at the stern), fourteen torpedoes, one 8.8 cm (3.46 in) SK C/35 naval gun, 220 rounds, and a 2 cm (0.79 in) C/30 anti-aircraft gun. The boat had a complement of between forty-four and sixty.

== Service history ==
The submarine was laid down on 16 April 1940 at Schichau-Werke in Danzig (now Gdansk) as yard number 1479, launched on 26 July 1941 and commissioned on 25 October under the command of Kapitänleutnant Werner-Karl Schultze.

She served with the 6th U-boat Flotilla from 25 October 1941 for training and stayed with that organization from 1 April 1942 until 5 October 1944.

=== First patrol ===
U-436's first patrol was from Kiel in Germany and took in the Atlantic Ocean, which she reached via the gap separating the Faroe and Shetland Islands. She arrived at St. Nazaire in occupied France on 16 April 1942. (She would continue to use this port for almost the rest of her career).

=== Second, third, fourth and fifth patrols ===
The boat's second sortie was as far as northwest of the Azores, but produced no results.

Her third foray took her to the Caribbean Sea and at 68 days, was her longest.

Patrol number four was relatively uneventful. It terminated at St. Nazaire on 15 November 1942.

U-436's fifth patrol was north of the Azores.

=== Sixth patrol ===
Her sixth effort was marked by an attack by a Leigh Light equipped Vickers Wellington of No. 172 Squadron RAF in the Bay of Biscay on 23 April 1943. Damage was extensive enough that U-437 was assisted back to base by U-455.

=== Seventh patrol ===
U-437's seventh patrol was divided into a series of short voyages, with the exception of the last part; but success continued to elude her.

=== Eighth patrol ===
It was a similar story for her eighth outing.

=== Ninth and tenth patrols ===
For the boat's ninth patrol, she did not leave the Bay of Biscay.

Following the Allied advance after D-Day, U-437 moved to Bordeaux after her tenth sortie.

=== Eleventh patrol ===
Reversing the course of her first patrol, including the Iceland/Faroes 'gap', the submarine arrived at Bergen in Norway on 21 September 1944.

=== Fate ===
U-437 was damaged by British bombs in Bergen on 4 October 1944; she was stricken a day later. She was broken up in 1946.

=== Wolfpacks ===
U-437 took part in 16 wolfpacks, namely:

- Endrass (12 – 17 June 1942)
- Blitz (22 – 26 September 1942)
- Tiger (26 – 30 September 1942)
- Luchs (1 – 6 October 1942)
- Panther (6 – 12 October 1942)
- Leopard (12 – 19 October 1942)
- Veilchen (27 October – 4 November 1942)
- Robbe (16 – 20 February 1943)
- Rossbach (6 – 9 October 1943)
- Schlieffen (14 – 22 October 1943)
- Siegfried (22 – 27 October 1943)
- Siegfried 2 (27 – 30 October 1943)
- Jahn (30 October – 2 November 1943)
- Igel 2 (15 – 17 February 1944)
- Hai 1 (17 – 22 February 1944)
- Preussen (22 February – 22 March 1944

== Bibliography ==
- Busch, Rainer; Röll, Hans-Joachim (1999). German U-boat commanders of World War II : a biographical dictionary. Translated by Brooks, Geoffrey. London, Annapolis, Md: Greenhill Books, Naval Institute Press. ISBN 1-55750-186-6.
- Busch, Rainer; Röll, Hans-Joachim (1999). Deutsche U-Boot-Verluste von September 1939 bis Mai 1945 [German U-boat losses from September 1939 to May 1945]. Der U-Boot-Krieg (in German). Vol. IV. Hamburg, Berlin, Bonn: Mittler. ISBN 3-8132-0514-2.
- Gröner, Erich; Jung, Dieter; Maass, Martin (1991). U-boats and Mine Warfare Vessels. German Warships 1815–1945. Vol. 2. Translated by Thomas, Keith; Magowan, Rachel. London: Conway Maritime Press. ISBN 0-85177-593-4.
