= USS Herbert =

Wickes-class destroyer

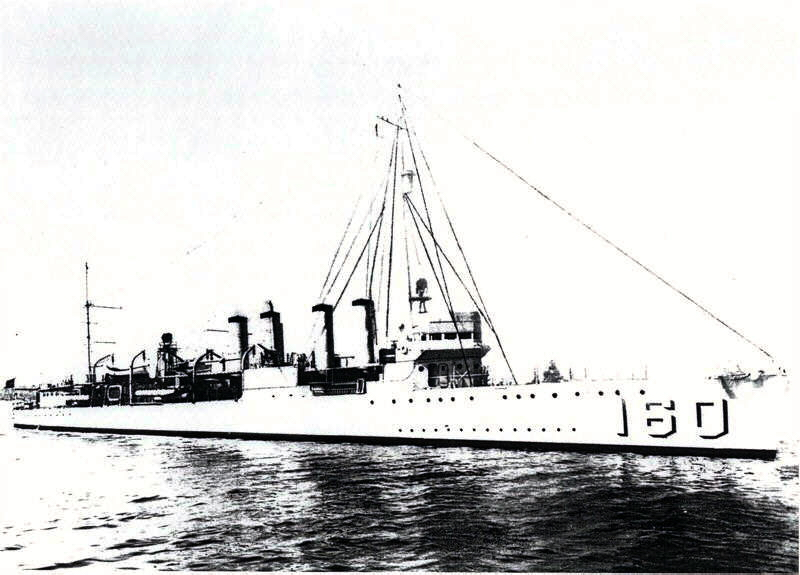
- USS Herbert (DD-160)

History

United States
- Namesake: Hilary A. Herbert
- Builder: New York Shipbuilding Corporation, Camden, New Jersey
- Laid down: 9 April 1918
- Launched: 8 May 1919
- Commissioned: 21 November 1919
- Decommissioned: 27 June 1922
- Recommissioned: 1 May 1930
- Reclassified: High-speed transport, APD-22, 1 December 1943
- Decommissioned: 25 September 1945
- Stricken: 24 October 1945
- Fate: Sold for scrapping 23 May 1946

General characteristics
- Class & type: Wickes-class destroyer
- Displacement: 1,090 tons
- Length: 314 ft 5 in (95.83 m)
- Beam: 31 ft 8 in (9.65 m)
- Draft: 9 ft 4 in (2.84 m)
- Speed: 35 knots (65 km/h)
- Complement: 124 officers and enlisted
- Armament: 4 x 4 in (102 mm)/50 guns, 3 x 3 in (76 mm)/23 guns, 12 x 21-inch (533 mm) tt.

USS Herbert (DD-160) was a Wickes-class destroyer. She was named for Hilary A. Herbert (1834–1919), Secretary of the Navy from 1893 to 1897.

== Construction and commissioning ==
Herbert was laid down by the New York Shipbuilding Corporation at Camden in New Jersey on 9 April 1918, launched on 8 May 1919 by Mrs. Benjamin Micou, daughter of the late Hilary A. Herbert and commissioned on 21 November 1919.

== Service history ==
After shakedown in South Atlantic waters, Herbert trained in the Caribbean until 1 May 1920, returning there 20 July with the Atlantic Fleet destroyer squadron. Herbert participated in torpedo practices, antiaircraft drills, and short range battle practice along the east coast. She decommissioned at Philadelphia 27 June 1922.

Herbert recommissioned 1 May 1930 and joined the Scouting Fleet at Newport, Rhode Island. For the next 4 years she operated in both East and West Coast waters, playing important roles in annual fleet problems and battle practice. From 16 January 1935 until August 1939, Herbert served as a training ship for Naval Reserves and midshipmen. As war swept across Europe, she sailed to Portugal via the Azores 2 October 1939 and remained there until July 1940.

Returning to the States, the destroyer underwent overhaul and 10 October reported to New London for sound school training. Herbert's training kept pace with the steadily intensifying war in Europe as she spent most of 1941 in battle practice, torpedo drills, and antisubmarine work.

=== World War II ===
With America's entry into the war, Herbert operated as a convoy escort along the American coast from Key West north to Halifax and Iceland. Guiding virtually defenseless merchant ships through coastal and Caribbean waters patrolled by U-boats, Herbert carried out frequent depth charge attacks on marauding submarines. From April through June 1943 she visited Gibraltar and North Africa, as the build-up for the invasion of Sicily intensified. A hunter-killer patrol followed. After a second patrol, Herbert escorted a convoy from Bermuda to Casablanca, returning to Charleston 22 November 1943 for conversion to a high-speed transport.

=== Convoys escorted ===
Convoy	Escort Group	Dates	Notes
HX 165		17–24 Dec 1941	from Newfoundland to Iceland
ON 51		2–11 Jan 1942	from Iceland to Newfoundland
HX 172		28 Jan-4 Feb 1942	from Newfoundland to Iceland
ON 65		12–19 Feb 1942	from Iceland to Newfoundland

=== Auxiliary service ===
Herbert now APD-22 sailed for the Pacific, reaching San Diego for amphibious training and continuing on to Cape Sudest, New Guinea, via Pearl Harbor 23 March 1944. She disembarked troops for the initial invasion at Humboldt Bay, New Guinea, 22 April and then spent a month on convoy escort duty before landing troops for the invasion of Biak Island 27 May. Landings at Warsai in the Cape Sansapor area 30 July followed further patrol and escort duty, and 15 September found Herbert off Morotai. Troops landed under naval cover to secure the airfield, which was within easy striking distance of the Philippines, next major step in the island-hopping war across the Pacific. On 17 October, 2 days before the initial landings at Leyte Gulf, Herbert landed Rangers on Homonhon Island which controlled the entrance to the Gulf. The destroyer remained in the Philippines, under almost constant Japanese air attack, throughout the rest of 1944; and, in January 1945, landed support troops at Lingayen Gulf.

From the Philippines, Herbert moved north for escort duty to Iwo Jima, returning to Leyte 18 March 1945 to prepare for the invasion of Okinawa, the largest amphibious operation of the Pacific war. Arriving Okinawa 31 March, the day before the initial landings, Herbert took up patrol and escort duties. Kamikaze attacks wounded ships all around her, but Herbert remained untouched. After two runs escorting convoys from back staging areas up to Okinawa, the destroyer headed home, reaching San Diego 19 June. Herbert was decommissioned at San Diego on 25 September 1945, stricken from the Naval Vessel Register on 24 October 1945 and sold for scrap to the Boston Metal Company of Baltimore in Maryland on 23 May 1946.

== Awards ==
Herbert received six battle stars for her World War II service.
