= German submarine U-552 =

German World War II submarine

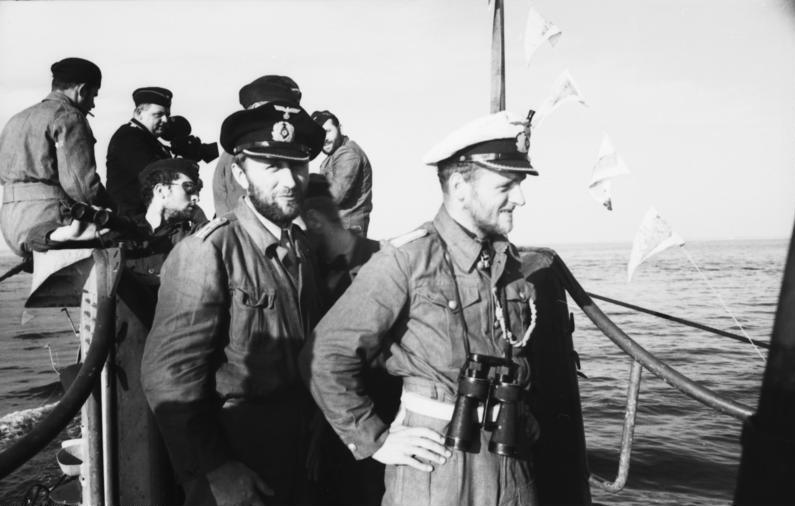
- Erich Topp (r) on U-552 in St. Nazaire in October 1941

History

Nazi Germany
- Name: U-552
- Ordered: 25 September 1939
- Builder: Blohm & Voss, Hamburg
- Yard number: 528
- Laid down: 1 December 1939
- Launched: 14 September 1940
- Commissioned: 4 December 1940
- Decommissioned: February 1945
- Fate: Scuttled on 5 May 1945 at Wilhelmshaven

General characteristics
- Class & type: Type VIIC submarine
- Displacement: 769 tonnes (757 long tons) surfaced; 871 t (857 long tons) submerged
- Length: 67.10 m (220 ft 2 in) o/a; 50.50 m (165 ft 8 in) pressure hull
- Beam: 6.20 m (20 ft 4 in) o/a; 4.70 m (15 ft 5 in) pressure hull
- Height: 9.60 m (31 ft 6 in)
- Draught: 4.74 m (15 ft 7 in)
- Installed power: 2,800–3,200 PS (2,100–2,400 kW; 2,800–3,200 bhp) (diesels); 750 PS (550 kW; 740 shp) (electric)
- Propulsion: 2 shafts; 2 × diesel engines; 2 × electric motors.
- Speed: 17.7 knots (32.8 km/h; 20.4 mph) surfaced; 7.6 knots (14.1 km/h; 8.7 mph) submerged
- Range: 8,500 nmi (15,700 km; 9,800 mi) at 10 knots (19 km/h; 12 mph) surfaced; 80 nmi (150 km; 92 mi) at 4 knots (7.4 km/h; 4.6 mph) submerged
- Test depth: 230 m (750 ft); Crush depth: 250–295 m (820–968 ft)
- Complement: 4 officers, 40–56 enlisted
- Armament: 5 × 53.3 cm (21 in) torpedo tubes (four bow, one stern); 14 × torpedoes or 26 TMA mines; 1 × 8.8 cm (3.46 in) deck gun (220 rounds); 1 x 2 cm (0.79 in) C/30 AA gun

Service record
- Part of: 7th U-boat Flotilla; 4 December 1940 – 30 April 1944; 22nd U-boat Flotilla; 1 May 1944 – February 1945
- Identification codes: M 20 052
- Commanders: K.Kapt. Erich Topp; 4 December 1940 – 8 September 1942; Kptlt. Klaus Popp; 9 September 1942 – 10 July 1944; Oblt.z.S. Günther Lube; 11 July 1944 – February 1945
- Operations: 15 patrols: 1st patrol: 18 February – 16 March 1941; 2nd patrol: 7 April – 6 May 1941; 3rd patrol: 25 May – 2 July 1941; 4th patrol: 18 – 26 August 1941; 5th patrol: 4 September – 5 October 1941; 6th patrol: 25 October – 26 November 1941; 7th patrol: 25 December 1941 – 27 January 1942; 8th patrol: 7 March – 27 April 1942; 9th patrol: 9 – 19 June 1942; 10th patrol: 4 July – 13 August 1942; 11th patrol: 10 September – 15 December 1942; 12th patrol: 4 April – 13 June 1943; 13th patrol: 3 October – 30 November 1943; 14th patrol: 8 – 14 February 1944; 15th patrol: 16 February – 28 April 1944
- Victories: 30 merchant ships sunk (163,756 GRT); 1 warship sunk (1,190 tons); 1 auxiliary warship sunk (520 GRT); 3 merchant ships damaged (26,910 GRT)

German submarine U-552 was a Type VIIC U-boat built for Nazi Germany's Kriegsmarine for service during World War II. She was laid down on 1 December 1939 at Blohm & Voss in Hamburg as yard number 528, launched on 14 September 1940, and went into service on 4 December 1940. U-552 was nicknamed the Roter Teufel ("Red Devil") after her mascot of a grinning devil, which was painted on the conning tower. She was one of the more successful of her class, operating for over three years of continual service and sinking or damaging 35 Allied ships with 164,276 gross register tonnage (GRT) and 1,190 tons sunk and 26,910 GRT damaged. She was a member of 21 wolf packs.

U-552 was involved in two controversial actions: On 31 October 1941, she sank the USS Reuben James, the first US Navy warship to be lost in World War II; this was at a time when the US was still officially neutral, and caused a diplomatic dispute. On 3 April 1942, she sank the freighter David H. Atwater off the US seaboard.

U-552 had an unusually long service life, surviving to the end of World War II; after evacuating from her French base during the spring of 1944, she operated on training duties in the Baltic Sea until she was decommissioned in February 1945. On 5 May 1945, she was scuttled in Helgoland Bight, to prevent her falling into enemy hands.

== Design ==
German Type VIIC submarines were preceded by the shorter Type VIIB submarines. U-552 had a displacement of 769 tonnes (757 long tons) when at the surface and 871 tonnes (857 long tons) while submerged. She had a total length of 67.10 m (220 ft 2 in), a pressure hull length of 50.50 m (165 ft 8 in), a beam of 6.20 m (20 ft 4 in), a height of 9.60 m (31 ft 6 in), and a draught of 4.74 m (15 ft 7 in). The submarine was powered by two Germaniawerft F46 four-stroke, six-cylinder, supercharged diesel engines producing a total of 2,800 to 3,200 metric horsepower (2,060 to 2,350 kW; 2,760 to 3,160 shp) for use while surfaced, and two Brown, Boveri & Cie GG UB 720/8 double-acting electric motors producing a total of 750 metric horsepower (550 kW; 740 shp) for use while submerged. She had two shafts and two 1.23 m (4 ft 0 in) propellers. The boat was capable of operating at depths of up to 230 metres (750 ft).

The submarine had a maximum surface speed of 17.7 knots (32.8 km/h; 20.4 mph) and a maximum submerged speed of 7.6 knots (14.1 km/h; 8.7 mph). When submerged, the boat could operate for 80 nautical miles (150 km; 92 mi) at 4 knots (7.4 km/h; 4.6 mph); when surfaced, she could travel 8,500 nautical miles (15,700 km; 9,800 mi) at 10 knots (19 km/h; 12 mph). U-552 was fitted with five 533 mm (21 in) torpedo tubes (four fitted at the bow and one at the stern), 14 torpedoes, one 88 mm (3.46 in) SK C/35 naval gun, 220 rounds, and a 20 mm (0.79 in) C/30 antiaircraft gun. The boat had a complement between 44 and 60.

== Service history ==
=== Initial voyage to Helgoland ===
Following construction, which was completed on 4 December 1940, U-552 was given two months of working-up training, during which she prepared her crew and equipment for the operations ahead. She then sailed from Kiel on 13 February 1941 to Helgoland for her first official patrol, arriving on 18 February 1941. This port city was to remain U-552's home base until she was transferred to the occupied French port of St Nazaire in mid-March 1941.

=== First patrol ===
U-552's first official war patrol began on 18 February 1941, when she left Helgoland for a patrol in the North Sea and the North Atlantic south of Iceland. This first operation yielded one British tanker and one Icelandic trawler carrying fish. The British tanker Cadillac was sunk just north of Scotland on 1 March, while the trawler was sunk just south of Iceland on 10 March. Following these victories, U-552 headed back to St Nazaire. The remainder of her later patrols were all conducted from the French city, which gave her easy access to the Atlantic Ocean and allowed her more time at sea.

=== Second patrol ===
U-552 began her second war patrol on 7 April 1941, when she left her new home port of St Nazaire for the North Atlantic. The U-552 arrived in her assigned patrol area south-west of Iceland on 11 April. No targets were engaged until 26 April when at 18:09 GMT, the U-552 was midway between Iceland and northern Scotland. Topp sighted “smoke cloud bearing 10°T” from a small “patrol vessel size” target. The target was followed “at the limit of visibility” while waiting for nightfall. At 00:10 (27 April), about 130 nautical miles SE of Iceland, the small vessel Commander Horton was attacked. The U-552 log records “Fishing trawler (patrol vessel) sunk with 82 shots of 8.8 cm and 102 shots MG C30. No resistance.” (Commander Horton, 227 tones, 14 casualties).

Around 11:00 GMT on 27 April, the U-552 was submerged and “Propeller sounds heard bearing 200°T”. Topp then commenced a surface pursuit of a large steamer. “Estimate enemy speed 16 knots. Am gaining only as a result of the zig zags.” At 14:12, at grid position AL3236, the Beacon Grange was in the targeting range of 1000 meters. The submerged U-552 fired a fan of three torpedoes. All three torpedoes hit the ship. A few minutes later while the crew were launching lifeboats, the U-552 surfaced and “ran in for a coup de grace”. A fourth torpedo was fired and the U-boat log records “Hit aft 20 meters. … Steamer breaks completely in the center, deck awash, ends continue to float.” (Beacon Grange, 10,119 tones, 2 casualties)

During the afternoon of 28 April 1941, a historic battle was underway about 180 miles south of Iceland. A wolf pack “Rudeltaktik” of five U-boats had launched the war's first submerged daylight attack on a convoy. The submerged U-boats, which were spread out over a distance of about 10 miles, intercepted and attacked an east-bound convoy. The U-123 (Karl-Heinz Moehle), had spotted Convoy HX 121 and called in U-65 (Joachim Hoppe), U-95 (Gerd Schreiber), U-96 (Heinrich Lehmann-Willenbrock), and U-552 (Erich Topp) for the kill. U-552 started things off at 14:15 GMT (60°06’N 20°18’W), when it torpedoed the British tanker Capulet. Nine casualties resulted, and the tanker was abandoned, but did not sink. At 17:25, three more ships were sunk by U-96 with one spread of three torpedoes: British tanker Oilfield (47 casualties, 8 survivors); Norwegian tanker Caledonia (12 casualties, 25 survivors); and British freighter Port Hardy (one casualty). U-65 was sunk by HMS Douglas in a depth-charge attack, and all 50 men in the crew perished.

After torpedoing the tanker Capulet, U-552 was depth charged in five separate attacks from destroyers HMS Maori and HMS Inglefield, forcing the submarine to remain submerged for hours until the convoy was out of range. The U-552 had been damaged and this would be a troubled day, with attacks from air and sea as it neared the convoy, swift dives, and gingerly resurfacing. After diving and hearing nothing at 01:45 on the 30th, Erich Topp realized that Convoy HX 121 must have changed course to the north. His convoy pursuit was broken off and his boat came to a southerly course. At 02:18 GMT, Topp sent a message to B.d.U. (Admiral Dönitz): “Sank: “Beacon Grange”, a patrol vessel. From convoy tanker 8000 tons. Return Transit via North Channel. [My position] AM2477.” In his log, Topp recorded “Intention: As long as fuel allows, position in North Channel.”

On 30 April, the surfaced U-552 was about 150 nautical miles west of the North Channel entrance … and searching for targets. At 21:40 GMT, Topp sighted a ship, the troopship S.S. Nerissa approaching from the north-west. For almost 2 hours, Topp stalked the zigzagging Nerissa and adjusted his torpedo firing solution accordingly. Finally, Topp saw a phosphorescent glow on the sea and decided that 1,000 metres was as close as he should approach his target, and he fired a fan of three torpedoes. The U-552 log records that one of the three torpedoes “hit astern” at 00:27 Berlin Time (GMT+2). About 6 minutes later, Topp closed in on the already stricken ship and fired a fourth torpedo as a coup de grace into Nerissa's aft starboard side while her crew and passengers were launching lifeboats. More than half of the 207 casualties were Canadians. (SS Nerissa, 5,583 tones, casualties 207)

The U-552 had four remaining torpedoes and she continued searching for merchant ships in transit towards the North Channel. Topp was not successful in engaging any additional targets and almost 48 hours after sinking the SS Nerissa, the U-552 commenced her homeward transit south. She arrived in St Nazaire on 6 May.

=== Third patrol ===
U-552 left St Nazaire for her third war patrol on 25 May 1941. In 39 days, she travelled into the North Atlantic and sank three British vessels: the Ainderby on 10 June, the Chinese Prince on 12 June, and the Norfolk on 18 June. During the attack on the Norfolk, U-552 attempted to attack the remaining ships in the convoy, but was forced to break off the attack due to the arrival of several of the convoy's escorts. All of these attacks occurred off the northwest coast of Ireland, and once U-552 returned to St. Nazaire on 2 July 1941, she had amassed a total of 24,401 GRT from the ships she had sunk.

=== Fourth patrol ===
U-552's fourth patrol was much less successful than her previous three. Having left St Nazaire on 18 August, she proceeded to head south into the waters off Portugal and Spain. Here, she sank the Norwegian vessel, Spind. Following this sinking, U-552 returned to St Nazaire on 26 August 1941, after only 9 days at sea.

=== Fifth and sixth patrols ===
Her next two patrols took her further into the Atlantic, where the danger was less, but so were the targets, with the result that she only hit three cargo ships. During her final patrol of 1941, she sank the Reuben James, which was torpedoed and sunk on 31 October in controversial circumstances.

==== Sinking of USS Reuben James ====
On 31 October 1941, USS Reuben James was one of five destroyers escorting convoy HX 156, close to the coast of Iceland, about 600 nmi (1,100 km; 690 mi) west of the island. Reuben James had just begun turning to investigate a strong direction- finder bearing when a torpedo launched from U-552 struck her port side and caused an explosion in her forward magazine. The entire bow section of the destroyer was blown off as far back as the fourth funnel and sank immediately. The stern remained afloat for around five minutes before sinking; unsecured depth charges compounded the damage, exploding as they sank and killing survivors in the water. Of her 160-man crew, 115 were killed, including all the officers.

The destroyer was the first US Navy warship to be sunk in World War II.

The incident provoked a furious outburst in the United States, especially when Germany refused to apologize, instead countering that the destroyer was operating in what Germany considered to be a war zone and had suffered the consequences. The sinking of the Reuben James did not lead the US to declare war on Germany; it did, however, provide a pretext to officially transfer the US Coast Guard from its peacetime role as an arm of the US Treasury Department to a wartime function as part of the US Navy. Congress also amended the Neutrality Act to permit the arming of US-registered merchant ships and authorized them to enter European waters for the first time since 1939.

=== Second Happy Time ===
In 1942, again commanded by Erich Topp (who later became an admiral in the postwar Bundesmarine), U-552 participated in the "Second Happy Time" (Operation Drumbeat or Paukenschlag), during which German submarines had great success against unescorted American merchantmen sailing alone along the eastern seaboard of the US. U-552 was particularly successful during this period, sinking 13 ships and damaging another in just three patrols in the first six months of 1942. Two further patrols under Topp during the summer netted four more ships. However, in an attack against Convoy ON 155 on 3 August 1942, the boat was nearly sunk when she was caught on the surface by the Canadian corvette HMCS Sackville. The corvette machine-gunned the submarine and hit the conning tower with a four-inch shell, causing severe damage and forcing Topp to return to base for repairs. U-552 was badly damaged by heavy seas during another patrol and put into port for repairs, during which Topp was promoted and replaced by a more cautious commander, Klaus Popp.

==== Sinking of the David H. Atwater ====
The destruction of the SS David H. Atwater, in the Atlantic Ocean 10 nmi (19 km; 12 mi) off Chincoteague, Virginia, was one of the more controversial actions of the Kriegsmarine during the Second World War, primarily due to the manner of the sinking.

On the night of 2 April 1942, at the height of the U-boat offensive against US shipping known as the "Second Happy Time", the unarmed coastal steamer David H. Atwater was en route from Norfolk, Virginia, to Fall River, Massachusetts, with a full load of 4,000 tons of coal.

Around 21:00, between Cape Charles and Cape Henlopen, the ship was ambushed by U-552, which had followed her submerged. The submarine surfaced about 500 m (600 yd) from the freighter and opened fire with her 88 mm deck gun and machine guns without warning, one of her first shells destroyed the bridge and killed all of the officers. In all, 93 rounds were fired from the deck gun, with 50 hits being recorded on the small freighter, which rapidly began to sink.

As it did so, Topp directed his crewmen to continue firing, striking the Atwater's crewmen as they tried to man the lifeboats. When Captain Webster was hit, the crew abandoned attempts to launch the lifeboats and leapt into the sea.

The first ship to arrive on the scene was the small Coast Guard Patrol Boat USCGC CG-218, which found a lifeboat holding three survivors and three bodies; the survivors reported that they had dived overboard and swum to the boat. Next on the scene was the Coast Guard cutter USCGC Legare, which had heard the gunfire and arrived just 15 minutes later. The Legare found a second lifeboat with a body aboard; the boat was discovered to have been riddled by gunfire, and lent strength to the widespread belief at the time that U-boats were deliberately murdering the survivors of ships they had sunk. The Legare landed the three survivors and four bodies at Chincoteague Island Coastguard Station, then returned to sea to search further.

The destroyers USS Noa and Herbert were directed to the scene at 21:22 and arrived at 24:00, but U-552 had by then escaped the scene, going on to sink other vessels.

Whether the attack on the liferafts was deliberate, or an unfortunate and unintended consequence of a nighttime attack, has been heavily debated. Some of the crew of U-552 survived the war, and her captain, Erich Topp, later became an admiral in the postwar Bundesmarine. No charges were brought against Topp, as happened to Helmuth von Ruckteschell, captain of the raider Widder for a similar offence.

=== Later patrols ===
U-552 had less success in later years, as did the U-boat force in general, as U-boats failed to keep ahead of the rapidly increasing numbers and capabilities of Allied antisubmarine efforts. She was transferred to operations off the Spanish, Portuguese, and African coasts, which were nearer to base and less dangerous than the newly reorganized defenses of the United States, where she attempted to sink troopships during Operation Torch. Whilst on this duty, Topp sank a small British minesweeper and later a cargo ship, but failed to enter the Straits of Gibraltar or seriously threaten the landings.

During 1943, U-552 was increasingly unable to serve effectively against the well-prepared and organized Allied convoy system, a fact reflected by her failure to sink a single ship during her two patrols into the North Atlantic Ocean. During one of these, a Royal Air Force B-24 Liberator aircraft spotted her and she was seriously damaged by depth charges, which necessitated four months' repairs.

In 1944, she had a single patrol, but was unable to close with or threaten any Allied convoys, so was withdrawn to Germany in April 1944 for use as a training vessel in the 22nd U-boat Flotilla, a role she fulfilled until she was decommissioned in February 1945. On 5 May 1945, she was scuttled in Wilhelmshaven Bay to prevent her capture.

=== Wolfpacks ===
U-552 took part in 21 wolfpacks, namely:

- Brandenburg (15 – 26 September 1941)
- Stosstrupp (30 October – 4 November 1941)
- Störtebecker (15 – 19 November 1941)
- Benecke (19 – 22 November 1941)
- Seydlitz (27 December 1941 – 6 January 1942)
- Zieten (6 – 19 January 1942)
- Endrass (12 – 17 June 1942)
- Wolf (13 – 30 July 1942)
- Pirat (30 July – 3 August 1942)
- Steinbrinck (3 – 4 August 1942)
- Meise (11 – 27 April 1943)
- Star (27 April – 4 May 1943)
- Fink (4 – 6 May 1943)
- Naab (12 – 15 May 1943)
- Donau 2 (15 – 19 May 1943)
- Mosel (19 – 24 May 1943)
- Siegfried (22 – 27 October 1943)
- Siegfried 2 (27 – 30 October 1943)
- Jahn (30 October – 2 November 1943)
- Tirpitz 3 (2 – 8 November 1943)
- Eisenhart 5 (9 – 15 November 1943)

== Summary of raiding history ==
Date	Ship Name	Nationality	Tonnage (Note: Merchant ship tonnages are in gross register tons. Military vessels are listed by tons displacement.)	Fate
1 March 1941	Cadillac	United Kingdom	12,062	Sunk
10 March 1941	Reykjaborg	Iceland	687	Sunk
27 April 1941	Commander Horton	United Kingdom	227	Sunk
27 April 1941	Beacon Grange	United Kingdom	10,119	Sunk
28 April 1941	Capulet	United Kingdom	8,190	Damaged
1 May 1941	Nerissa	United Kingdom	5,583	Sunk
10 June 1941	Ainderby	United Kingdom	4,860	Sunk
12 June 1941	Chinese Prince	United Kingdom	8,593	Sunk
18 June 1941	Norfolk	United Kingdom	10,948	Sunk
23 August 1941	Spind	Norway	2,129	Sunk
20 September 1941	T.J. Williams	United Kingdom	8,212	Sunk
20 September 1941	Pink Star	Panama	4,150	Sunk
20 September 1941	Barbaro	Norway	6,325	Sunk
31 October 1941	USS Reuben James	United States Navy	1,190	Sunk
15 January 1942	Dayrose	United Kingdom	4,113	Sunk
18 January 1942	Frances Salman	United States	2,609	Sunk
20 January 1942	Maro	Greece	3,838	Sunk
25 March 1942	Ocana	Netherlands	6,256	Sunk
3 April 1942	David H. Atwater	United States	2,438	Sunk
4 April 1942	Byron D. Benson	United States	7,953	Sunk
7 April 1942	British Splendour	United Kingdom	7,138	Sunk
7 April 1942	Lancing	Norway	7,866	Sunk
9 April 1942	Atlas	United States	7,137	Sunk
10 April 1942	Tarnaulipas	United States	6,943	Sunk
15 June 1942	City of Oxford	United Kingdom	2,759	Sunk
15 June 1942	Etrib	United Kingdom	1,943	Sunk
15 June 1942	Pelayo	United Kingdom	1,346	Sunk
15 June 1942	Slemdal	Norway	7,374	Sunk
15 June 1942	Thurso	United Kingdom	2,436	Sunk
25 July 1942	British Merit	United Kingdom	8,093	Damaged
25 July 1942	Broompark	United Kingdom	5,136	Sunk
3 August 1942	G.S. Walden	United Kingdom	10,627	Damaged
3 August 1942	Lochatrine	United Kingdom	9,419	Sunk
19 September 1942	HMS Alouette	Royal Navy	520	Sunk
3 December 1942	Wallsend	United Kingdom	3,157	Sunk

== Bibliography ==
- Bridgland, Tony, Waves of Hate:Naval atrocities in the Second World War (2002) ISBN 0-85052-822-4
- Browning, Robert M. Jr. U.S. Merchant Vessel War Casualties of World War II. Annapolis, MD: Naval Institute Press, 1995. ISBN 1-55750-087-8.
- Busch, Rainer; Röll, Hans-Joachim (1999). German U-boat commanders of World War II : a biographical dictionary. Translated by Brooks, Geoffrey. London, Annapolis, Md: Greenhill Books, Naval Institute Press. ISBN 1-55750-186-6.
- Busch, Rainer; Röll, Hans-Joachim (1999). Deutsche U-Boot-Verluste von September 1939 bis Mai 1945 [German U-boat losses from September 1939 to May 1945]. Der U-Boot-Krieg (in German). Vol. IV. Hamburg; Berlin; Bonn: Mittler. ISBN 3-8132-0514-2.
- Edwards, Bernard (1996). Dönitz and the Wolf Packs - The U-boats at War. Cassell Military Classics. pp. 75, 77, 81, 85. ISBN 0-304-35203-9.
- Gröner, Erich; Jung, Dieter; Maass, Martin (1991). German Warships 1815–1945, U-boats and Mine Warfare Vessels. Vol. 2. Translated by Thomas, Keith; Magowan, Rachel. London: Conway Maritime Press. ISBN 0-85177-593-4.
- Sharpe, Peter (1998). U-Boat Fact File. Great Britain: Midland Publishing. ISBN 1-85780-072-9.
- Owen, James (2010). Danger UXB - The Heroic Story of the WWII Bomb Disposal Teams. Little, Brown. ISBN 978-1-4087-0255-0.
