= Erich Topp =

German WW2 U-Boat commander (1914–2005)

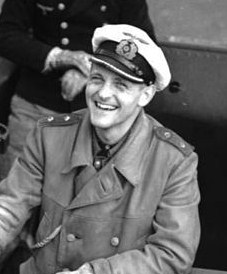
- Topp in 1942
- Born: 2 July 1914; Hannover, German Empire
- Died: 26 December 2005 (aged 91); Süßen, Germany
- Military career
- Allegiance: Nazi Germany; West Germany
- Branch: Kriegsmarine; German Navy
- Service years: 1934–45; 1958–69
- Rank: Kriegsmarine: Fregattenkapitän; Bundesmarine: Konteradmiral
- Service number: NSDAP #2,621,078
- Units: 1st U-boat Flotilla; 7th U-boat Flotilla; 4th U-boat Flotilla; 11th U-boat Flotilla
- Commands: U-57; U-552; U-3010; U-2513
- Conflicts: See battles World War II: Battle of the Atlantic; Second Happy Time
- Awards: Knight's Cross of the Iron Cross with Oak Leaves and Swords; Great Cross of Merit

Erich Topp (2 July 1914 – 26 December 2005) was a German U-boat commander of World War II. He was a recipient of the Knight's Cross of the Iron Cross with Oak Leaves and Swords of Nazi Germany. He sank 35 ships for a total of 197,460 gross register tons (GRT). After the war, he served with the Federal German Navy, in which he reached the rank of Konteradmiral (rear admiral). He later served in NATO.

== Early life and career ==
Topp was born in Hannover on 2 July 1914. Topp joined the Reichsmarine on 8 April 1934. (Note: The German Reichsmarine was renamed to Kriegsmarine on 1 June 1935.) He received his military basic training between 8 April 1934 – 13 June 1934. He was then transferred to the school ship Gorch Fock on 14 June 1934, and to the light cruiser Karlsruhe on 27 September 1934. Under the command of Kapitän zur See Günther Lütjens, Topp sailed on Karlsruhe's fourth training cruise. Karlsruhe left Kiel on 22 October 1934. The ship sailed via Skagen, the Azores and Trinidad to North America. Karlsruhe returned to Kiel on 15 June 1935.

Following his journey on Karlsruhe, Topp attended the main cadet course at the Naval Academy Mürwik (30 June 1935 – 29 June 1936). During this time at the naval academy, he advanced in rank to Fähnrich zur See (officer cadet) on 1 July 1935 and underwent further training. On 16 October 1936, he was again transferred to Karlsruhe, staying onboard until 31 March 1937. The next day, he was promoted to Leutnant zur See (second lieutenant) and took a torpedo training course, which he completed on 17 April. On 18 April, he was yet again posted to Karlsruhe, serving as an adjutant until 4 October 1937.

On 5 October 1937, Topp started his U-boat training at the U-boat school in Neustadt in Holstein and then became instruction officer. Topp was then posted to the Wegener Flotilla on 26 September 1938. There, he was appointed first watch officer on U-46 under the command of Kapitänleutnant Herbert Sohler. On 1 April 1939, Topp was promoted to Oberleutnant zur See (sublieutenant).

=== National Socialism ===
In May 1933, Topp joined the Nazi Party and in 1934 also joined the Allgemeine-SS. Topp took the Hitler oath, convinced it was the "right thing to do." To the beginning of the war at least, his peers regarded Topp as a Nazi. Topp made the acquaintance of Martin Bormann, Hitler's personal secretary and head of the Nazi Party Chancellery. Bormann married the sister of Topp's crew mate, Walter Buch. Topp was close enough to be invited to Bormann's residence in Berchtesgaden. Topp's political outlook was not shared by his uncle. His aunt through marriage, Anna Topp, was Jewish. During the Nazi reign, she was sent to and survived the Theresienstadt Ghetto. In his memoirs, Topp claimed not to have believed in Nazi ideology. One analyst wrote, "the contrasts and Topp's individual course make obvious the limitations of any quantitative study" [of his political convictions].

Topp came to terms with the Nazi regime and its crimes postwar. He entered into heated arguments with former comrades over the cause for which they fought. Topp was particularly critical of Admiral Karl Dönitz, commander-in-chief of U-boats and later the Kriegsmarine, and briefly defacto President of Germany. After the war, Topp expressed his view that the German naval command, and his superior Karl Dönitz, knew of the Holocaust. Topp referenced Dönitz's commitment to National Socialism, admiration for Hitler, and his presence at the Posen speeches. Topp was critical of Dönitz's pretensions to have been an apolitical soldier. Topp said of Dönitz, that his failure to do anything about it "comes very close to a passive toleration of these insane crimes." Few former U-boat commanders were as vocal in attacking Dönitz's character. His aunt's experiences in the ghetto from 1943 may have been a factor. Dönitz confronted Topp personally when the latter called upon him. He purportedly greeted Topp with a question, "I understand you think I should have been executed?" He presented Topp with his accusation, underlined, and a letter from Samuel Eliot Morison, the official historian of the United States Navy, which accepted Dönitz's defence that he knew nothing of the Nazi crimes. Morison was who told Dönitz of Topp's accusations, or "doubts", as Topp later claimed they were.

== World War II ==
World War II commenced following the German invasion of Poland on 1 September 1939. U-46, under the command of Sohler, had already been at sea since 19 August, returning to port on 15 September. Topp sailed on three further patrols on U-46 (3 October – 7 November 1939, 19 December 1939 – 10 January 1940 and 11 March – 23 April 1940). During these patrols, U-46 sank one ship of 7,028 gross register tons (GRT) on 17 October and another ship of 924 GRT on 21 December. For his service on U-46, Topp was awarded the U-boat War Badge (U-Boot-Kriegsabzeichen) on 7 November 1939 and the Iron Cross 2nd Class (Eisernes Kreuz zweiter Klasse) in January 1940. On 1 May 1940, he was transferred to the 1st U-boat Flotilla.

=== Command of U-57 ===
After eight war patrols under the command of Kapitänleutnant Claus Korth, command of U-57 of the 1st U-boat Flotilla was passed to Topp on 5 June 1940. Topp's fifth war patrol began in Kiel on 11 July 1940 and was destined for the North Atlantic, into the North Channel, and the Minch. Because the Gruppenhorchgerät, a hydrophone array, was experiencing technical difficulties, Topp took U-57 to port for repairs. U-57 arrived in Bergen on 15 July, departed again that day only to return to Bergen on 20 July. Two days later, U-57 was able to begin her patrol. The Befehlshaber der U-Boote (BdU—supreme commander of the U-boat arm) credited Topp with the sinking three ships of 12,773 GRT of shipping. On 7 August, U-57 arrived in Lorient, France.

On 14 August 1940, U-57 departed from Lorient on her 10th war patrol. Again, Topp led U-57 into the North Atlantic, the North Channel, and the Hebrides. On this patrol, Topp sank three ships of 24,088 GRT, and damaged another ship of 5,407 GRT. On 3 September 1940, U-57 collided with the Norwegian vessel Rona near the lock at Brunsbüttel and sank. Following the loss of U-57 — the boat was later raised and used for training purposes — Topp was awarded Iron Cross 1st Class (Eisernes Kreuz erster Klasse) and initially remained with 1st U-boat Flotilla. On 4 November, he was sent to Blohm & Voss, the shipbuilding works in Hamburg, for construction training of U-552, a Type VIIC U-boat.

=== Transfer to U-552 ===
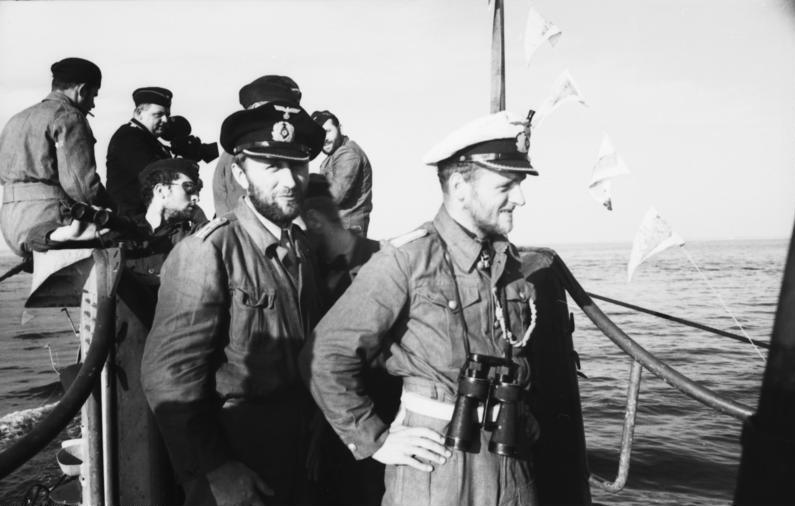
U-552 returning to St. Nazaire, Koitschka standing left of Topp

On 4 December 1940, Topp took command of U-552 and commissioned the U-boat into the 7th U-boat Flotilla. Following sea trials and training, Topp, with Leutnant zur See Siegfried Koitschka as his second watch officer, took U-552 on its first war patrol on 13 February 1941. The patrol, which was destined for the North Atlantic west of Ireland, began in Kiel. That day, they headed for Brunsbüttel, where they stayed one day. The following day, U-552 made a stopover at Cuxhaven before leaving for Heligoland on 15 February. After three days at Heligoland, Topp took the boat into the North Atlantic. U-552's first patrol ended in Saint-Nazaire, France on 16 March 1941. On this patrol, Topp sank two ships of 12,749 GRT.

The second patrol on U-552 began on 7 April 1941 from Saint-Nazaire and targeted the shipping routes in the North Atlantic, south of Iceland. On this patrol, the BdU credited Topp with the sinking of three ships and one escort totaling 24,319 GRT. The patrol ended on 6 May, again in Saint-Nazaire. In reality, Topp sank three ships totaling 15,970 GRT, and damaged one ship of 8,190 GRT which was then sunk by U-201 (Adalbert Schnee). The third ship sunk during Topp's second patrol in command of U-552, was the troopship S.S. Nerissa (5,583 GRT, 207 casualties and 84 survivors) on 30 April 1941 about 140 nautical miles west of the North Channel. This sinking resulted in the third-largest loss of life for a ship sunk by U-boats in the approaches to the British Isles during the Second World War.

On 25 May, Topp took U-552 on its third war patrol. The next day, U-552 returned to Saint-Nazaire before heading for North Channel on 3 June. The BdU assumed that Topp sank three ships of 25,548 GRT and he was awarded the Knight's Cross of the Iron Cross (Ritterkreuz des Eisernen Kreuzes) on 20 June 1941. This patrol ended on 2 July in Saint-Nazaire. Later analysis revealed that the true tonnage sunk accumulated to 24,401 GRT. One of the ships was the 10,948 GRT Norfolk. The vessel carried mail and steel plates among 4,000 tons of general cargo. Captain Frederick Lougheed and 69 men were saved; one man was lost.

Korvettenkapitän Harro Schacht was Topp's commander in training on U-552's fourth war patrol. The patrol, which began on 18 August and ended on 26 August in Saint-Nazaire, resulted in the sinking of one ship of 2,129 GRT. This ship had previously been damaged by U-564 (Reinhard Suhren). Following this patrol, Topp was promoted to Kapitänleutnant (lieutenant commander) on 1 September 1941. The fifth war patrol took U-552 into the North Atlantic, patrolling southeast of Greenland. Topp left Saint-Nazaire on 4 September and sank three ships of 18,687 GRT. U-552 returned to Saint-Nazaire on 5 October.

=== Reuben James and Second Happy time ===
The next patrol began on 25 October and ended on 26 November 1941 in Saint-Nazaire. This was also Koitschka's last war patrol as first watch officer on U-552. On 31 October 1941, during U-552's sixth war patrol into the North Atlantic, Topp encountered the destroyer USS Reuben James escorting Convoy HX 156 east of the Grand Banks of Newfoundland; hit by a torpedo in a forward magazine, she went down with the loss of 100 of her 144 crew, the first United States Navy warship to be lost in World War II. The destruction of the Reuben James facilitated a worsening of already rapidly deteriorating diplomatic relations between Nazi Germany and the still nominally neutral United States of America. President Franklin D. Roosevelt used the incident to shift public opinion toward a confrontational stance with the European Axis powers. Support for the Neutrality Acts of the 1930s gradually eroded. On 13 November 1941, amendments to the act allowed for the arming of US merchant ships, their operation in the war zone, and active assistance to the British Empire to increase the tonnage available to it. Hitler and the Nazi leadership wished to keep the US neutral and the order to minimise contact at sea remained in force, at least until Operation Barbarossa had destroyed the Soviet Union. Roosevelt did not publicly mention the destroyer was escorting a British convoy, was not flying the Ensign of the United States, and was in the process of dropping depth charges on another U-boat when it was engaged and sunk.

On 11 December 1941, Hitler declared war on the United States. Dönitz ordered immediate offensive operations off the East Coast of the United States. Codenamed Operation Drumbeat (Unternehmen Paukenschlag), the U-boat fleet inflicted the largest naval defeat on the US Navy in history. Though few in number at the beginning—just five—the U-boats pressed home attacks close to the shore, from Newfoundland to the Gulf of Mexico. The American failure to initialise a blackout, ship captains' insistence on following peace-time procedures, and lack of effective naval defences contributed to high losses. In all, 397 ships were sunk during Drumbeat. The Germans termed this period, the "Second Happy Time". Topp crossed the Atlantic and joined Wolfpack Zieten.

Oberleutnant zur See Albrecht Brandi joined Topp's crew as a commander in training on U-552's seventh war patrol. The patrol to the West Atlantic, Grand Banks of Newfoundland, and Nova Scotia started on 25 December in Saint-Nazaire. Topp sank three ships totaling 10,560 GRT before returning to Saint-Nazaire on 27 January 1942. Topp experienced mechanical problems with his torpedoes. On 15 January, he expended four on the small merchant ship Dayrose from a range of 800 metres before a fifth sank it. Topp signalled BdU about the incident. Topp experienced the same problems in the sinking of Frances Salman, five miles south of Cape Race. Repeated failures were psychologically unnerving. Unable to load the spare torpedoes from deck stowage due to icing and inclement weather, BdU called him home.

The eighth war patrol took U-552 to West Atlantic and to the East Coast of the United States. Topp left Saint-Nazaire on 7 March, returning on 27 April. On this patrol, he sank seven ships with a total tonnage of 45,731 GRT. While at sea, Topp received the message on 11 April that he had been awarded the Knight's Cross of the Iron Cross with Oak Leaves (Ritterkreuz des Eisernen Kreuzes mit Eichenlaub). He was the 87th member of the Wehrmacht to be so honoured. On 11 April, Dönitz also awarded him the U-boat War Badge with Diamonds (U-Boot-Kriegsabzeichen mit Brillanten).

Topp's sinking of the SS David H. Atwater has cast a shadow on his conduct in action. When he spotted the coastal steamer off Chincoteague, Virginia, on 3 April 1942, he surfaced U-552, overtook it from astern, and, without offering the captain the chance to surrender, attacked it with his deck gun from 600 yards, firing a total of 93 rounds. Captain Bill Webster was killed in the shelling. Atwater's civilian Merchant Marine crew of 27 suffered 24 lost lives during the attack. According to one account, when USCGC Legare appeared, it found the ship sunk with only several feet of its mast still visible. Bodies were seen, including one in a lifeboat riddled with machine gun holes.

Topp's ninth war patrol on U-552 went to the North Atlantic, west of Spain. Leaving Saint-Nazaire on 9 June, Topp sank five ships totaling 15,825 GRT before returning to port 10 days later. Topp formed part of a strong wolf pack against Convoy HG 84. Topp engaged the convoy 400 nautical miles (460 miles; 740 kilometres) west-northwest of A Coruña. Topp achieved all his successes on this patrol against HG 84. On his 10th and last war patrol on U-552, Topp sank two ships of 14,555 GRT and damaged two further of 18,720 GRT. Topp had left Saint-Nazaire on 4 July and returned from the North Atlantic on 13 August. Upon his return, he was awarded the Knight's Cross of the Iron Cross with Oak Leaves and Swords (Ritterkreuz des Eisernen Kreuzes mit Eichenlaub und Schwertern) on 17 August. He was the 17th member of the Wehrmacht to be so honored. That day, he also received a preferential promotion to Korvettenkapitän (corvette captain) and Dönitz presented him an honorary dagger of the Kriegsmarine with diamonds.

=== Shore duty ===
U-2513 off Key West, October 1946

Command of U-552 was passed on to Kapitänleutnant Klaus Popp. Topp officially remained with the 7th U-boat Flotilla until 4 November, when he was appointed chief of the 27th U-boat Flotilla, a training flotilla based in Gotenhafen (now Gdynia, Poland). In August 1944, Topp was appointed head of the department charged with introducing the Type XXI submarines into service, the first submarines designed to operate primarily submerged. In this position, he was promoted to Fregattenkapitän (frigate captain) on 1 December 1944.

On 23 March 1945, he was appointed commander of U-3010 in the 4th U-boat Flotilla, and commander of U-2513 in the 11th U-boat Flotilla on 26 April. On 20 May 1945, Topp was taken prisoner of war in Kragerø, Norway. He was released on 17 August 1945. Topp's boat, U-2513, was tested by the US Navy. American reports concluded at 12 knots submerged speed, she is quieter than our best fleet submarines at six....up to 10 knots she is extremely quiet." The same report concluded at least seven ships were required to carry out a search for the XXI submarine.

== Later life and Bundesmarine ==
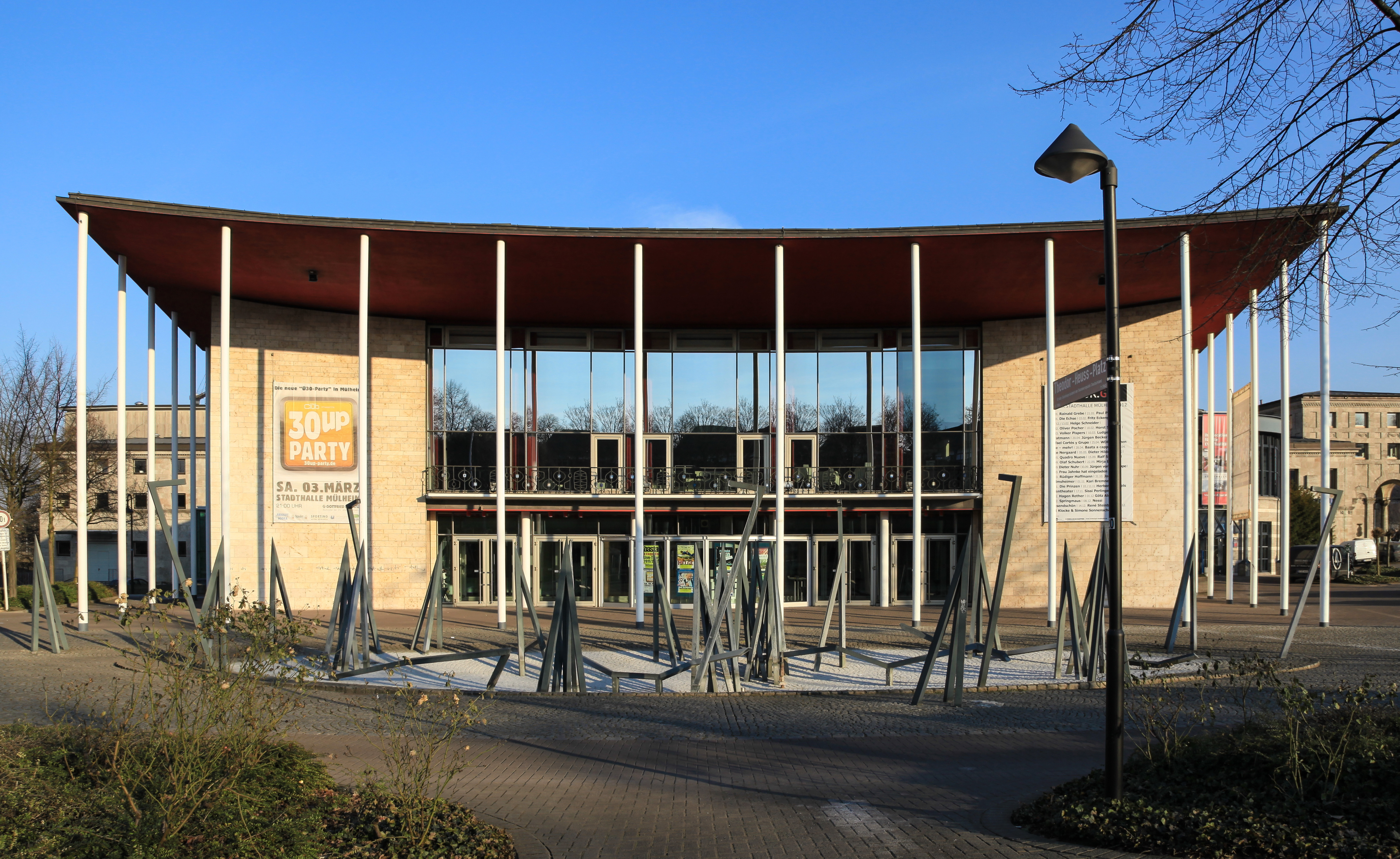
Prof. Gerhard Graubner and Topp designed and built the Stadthalle (city's event hall) in Mülheim an der Ruhr.

On 4 June 1946, he started at the Technical University of Hannover, studying architecture, and graduated in 1950 with a degree in engineering. He also served as technical advisor for the 1957 film Sharks and Little Fish.

On 3 March 1958, Topp joined West Germany's navy, at the time named the Bundesmarine (Federal Navy), holding the rank of Fregattenkapitän. His first assignment was with the Führungsstab der Marine (navy staff). On 16 August 1958, he served with the NATO Military Committee in Washington, DC, initially as a naval speaker, later as the chief-of-staff of the German delegation in Washington. During this assignment, he was promoted to Kapitän zur See (captain at sea/captain) on 1 November 1959. On 1 January 1962, Topp was transferred to the position of commander of the Bundesmarine's Amphibische Streitkräfte ("amphibious forces"), a position he held until 30 September 1963. In parallel, on 1 November 1962, he was made acting commander of U-boats, serving in this capacity until 1 December 1962.

Topp was then appointed chief-of-staff of the Flottenkommando (Fleet Command) on 1 October 1963. On 1 July 1965, he headed the sub command department with Führungsstab der Marine in the Federal Ministry of Defence. There, Topp was promoted to Flottillenadmiral (flotilla admiral) on 15 November 1965. On 1 October 1966, Topp was named deputy Inspector of the Navy and at the same time became the chief of the Führungsstab der Marine in the Federal Ministry of Defence. In this role, Topp was promoted to Konteradmiral (counter admiral) on 21 December 1966. Topp held this position until 30 September 1969. He then continued to serve with Inspector of the Navy until his retirement on 31 December 1969. For his service with the Bundesmarine, Topp was awarded the Commander's Cross of the Order of Merit of the Federal Republic of Germany (Großes Verdienstkreuz des Verdienstordens der Bundesrepublik Deutschland) on 19 September 1969.

In 1968, Topp had been considered as head of the Plans and Policy department with the Allied Forces Northern Europe in Kolsås, Norway which at the time was headed by the German Konteradmiral Heinrich Erdmann. The Supreme Allied Commander Europe, US General Lyman Lemnitzer, had originally approved this nomination. In order to not unnecessarily stress the German-Norwegian relationship, Topp had sunk four Norwegian vessels in World War II, Lemnitzer later decided against Topp and appointed Konteradmiral Friedrich Guggenberger, instead.

After retiring from the Bundesmarine, for a few years Topp was a technical advisor to the German shipyard HDW AG. His service as a NATO advisor was loosely portrayed (as "Commodore Wolfgang Schrepke") in the 1965 movie The Bedford Incident. His memoirs The Odyssey of a U-Boat Commander: The Recollections of Erich Topp was published in 1992. When Topp was asked in 1996 by publisher/historian Theodore P. Savas to contribute a Foreword for a collection of essays on German U-boat commanders, he instead submitted a contribution about his close friend Engelbert Endrass, who was lost with his crew and boat U-567 off Gibraltar in late December 1941. Topp had privately penned the piece about their friendship on his next patrol to the East Coast of America, but had never submitted it for publication. The essay was translated from German and footnoted by Dr. Eric Rust, and appeared as the opening chapter in Silent Hunters: German U-boat Commanders of World War II (1997, 2003, 2005). Savas also recruited Topp to serve as the technical adviser for the 2001 submarine simulation computer game Silent Hunter II, and a series of interviews with him appears in the game. He was interviewed on World War II submarine operations for the Nova (TV series) special Hitler's Lost Sub, which detailed the efforts of a team of divers, led by John Chatterton and Richie Kohler, to identify an unknown German U-boat wreck 65 miles off the coast of New Jersey; the wreck was identified as U-869.

A large oil painting of his deceased close comrade Endrass hung in his home after the war until the time of his death. In his front room overlooking the Rhine River was the top of the periscope from U-552, which immediately after the war, some of his crewman had managed to remove from the captured boat and pass to him as a keepsake. Topp died on 26 December 2005, in Süßen, at the age of 91; he was survived by two sons, Peter Kay (1945-2015) and Michael (b. 1950), and five grandchildren.

== Awards ==
- U-boat War Badge (7 November 1939)
  - with Diamonds (11 April 1942)
- Honorary dagger of the Kriegsmarine with Diamonds (17 August 1942)
- War Merit Cross
  - 2nd Class with Swords (30 January 1944)
  - 1st Class with Swords (1944)
- Iron Cross (1939)
  - 2nd Class (1 January 1940) (Note: According to Thomas in January 1940.)
  - 1st Class (1 September 1940) (Note: According to Thomas in September 1940.)
- Knight's Cross of the Iron Cross with Oak Leaves and Swords
  - Knight's Cross on 20 June 1941 as Oberleutnant zur See and commander of U-552
  - 87th Oak Leaves on 11 April 1942 as Kapitänleutnant and commander of U-552
  - 17th Swords on 17 August 1942 as Kapitänleutnant and commander of U-552
- Commander's Cross of the Order of Merit of the Federal Republic of Germany (19 September 1969)

== Notes ==
Military offices
Preceded by Kapitän zur See Otto Kretschmer	commander of the amphibious forces 1 January 1962 – 30 September 1963	Succeeded by Kapitän zur See Adolf Piening
Preceded by Konteradmiral Karl Hetz	Deputy Inspector of the Navy; 1 October 1966 – 30 September 1969	Succeeded by Konteradmiral Heinz Kühnle
