= Battle of the St. Lawrence =

Marine and anti-submarine actions in WWII

- Part of the Battle of the Atlantic
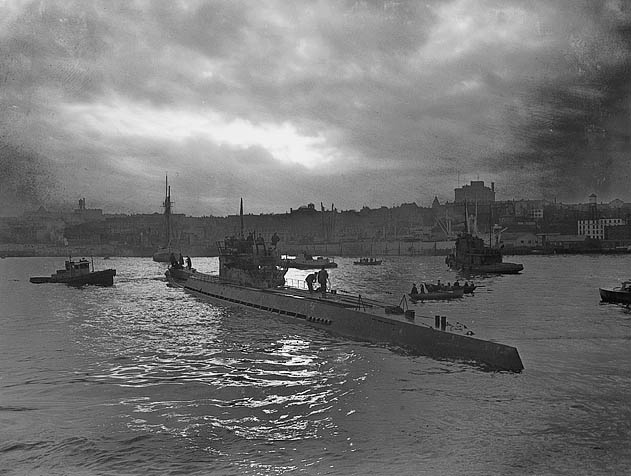
- German submarine U-190 arrives in St. John's, Newfoundland in June 1945 after surrendering
| Date | May 1942 – November 1944 |
| Location | Gulf of St. Lawrence, St. Lawrence River |
| Result | Allied strategic victory |

Belligerents
| Canada; United Kingdom: Newfoundland | Germany |

Commanders and leaders
| Percy W. Nelles; Leonard W. Murray | Karl Dönitz |

Strength
| Royal Canadian Navy: 14 frigates; 31 corvettes; 35 minesweepers; 4 armed yachts; 1 auxiliary ship; Royal Canadian Air Force: 12 bomber-reconnaissance squadrons; 1 fighter squadron; Royal Navy: 2 destroyers | Kriegsmarine: 17 U-boats |

Casualties and losses
| 23 merchant ships sunk 4 RCN ships sunk 340 killed | Some U-boats damaged and some crewmen killed; all spies captured |

The Battle of the St. Lawrence involved marine and anti-submarine actions throughout the lower St. Lawrence River and the entire Gulf of Saint Lawrence, Strait of Belle Isle, Anticosti Island and Cabot Strait from May to October 1942, September 1943, and again in October–November 1944. During this time, German U-boats sank over 20 merchant ships and four Canadian warships. There were several near-shore actions involving the drop of German spies, or the attempted pickup of escaping prisoners of war. Despite the 23 ships lost, this battle marked a strategic victory for Canadian forces as ultimately they managed to disrupt U-boat activity, protect Canadian and Allied convoys, and intercept all attempted shore operations. This marked the first time that a foreign power had inflicted casualties in Canadian inland waters since the US incursions in the War of 1812.

In the interwar years, poor economic conditions and a sense of security, engendered by the proximity of the United States and the traditional protection of the Royal Navy, had resulted in the Royal Canadian Navy (RCN) being equipped with very few ships, especially for coastal defence. Upgraded to six destroyers just before the war, Canadian naval deployment gave priority to the North Atlantic convoy routes. By the end of the war, the RCN had expanded to become the third largest Allied naval power, with 400 vessels and 100,000 men and women. The Royal Navy contributed two destroyers to the fight in October 1942 when attacks reached their peak.

== Historical context ==
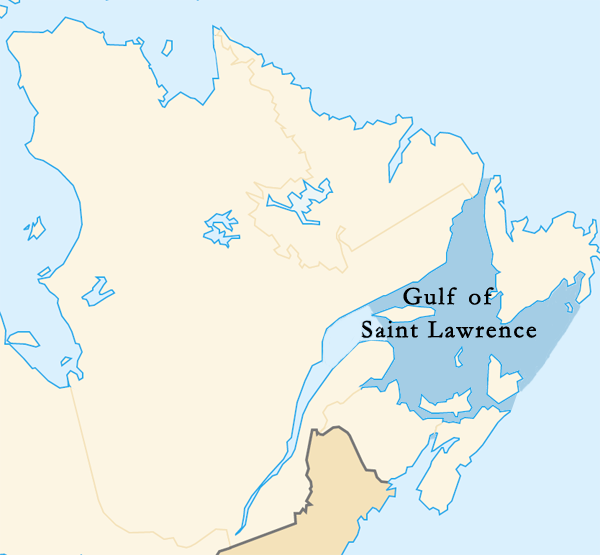
The Gulf of Saint Lawrence

From the start of the war in 1939 until VE Day, several of Canada's Atlantic coast ports became important to the resupply effort for the United Kingdom and later for the Allied land offensive on the Western Front. Halifax and Sydney, Nova Scotia, became the primary convoy assembly ports, with Halifax being assigned the fast or priority convoys (largely troops and essential material) with the more modern merchant ships, while Sydney was given slow convoys which conveyed bulkier material on older and more vulnerable merchant ships. Both ports were heavily fortified with shore radar emplacements, searchlight batteries, and extensive coastal artillery stations all manned by RCN and Canadian Army regular and reserve personnel. Military intelligence agents enforced strict blackouts throughout the areas and anti-torpedo nets were in place at the harbour entrances. Even though no landings of German personnel took place near these ports, there were frequent attacks by U-boats on convoys departing for Europe.

Less extensively used, but no less important, was the port of Saint John, New Brunswick, which also saw matériel funnelled through the port, largely after the United States entered the war in December 1941: the Canadian Pacific Railway mainline from central Canada to Saint John (which crossed the state of Maine) could not be used to transport war matériel while the United States was neutral. Canadian National's all-Canadian routes from central Canada to Halifax and Sydney were unaffected by US neutrality.

Although not crippling to the Canadian war effort, given the country's rail network to the east coast ports, but possibly more destructive to the morale of the Canadian public, was the Battle of the St. Lawrence, when U-boats began to attack domestic coastal shipping along Canada's east coast in the St. Lawrence River and Gulf of St. Lawrence from early 1942 through to the end of the shipping season in late 1944.

== Spring 1942 ==
The Kriegsmarine had made no formal plans to attack merchant shipping in the St. Lawrence River and Gulf of St. Lawrence, despite its activities off the convoy assembly ports of Halifax and Sydney, Nova Scotia; therefore, early attacks in the Battle of the St. Lawrence were considered ad hoc and opportunistic.

The first attack was by U-553, which torpedoed and sank the British freighter Nicoya at the mouth of the St. Lawrence River several kilometres off Anticosti Island on 12 May 1942, followed by the Dutch freighter Leto in the same vicinity several hours later. U-553 departed the Gulf of St. Lawrence to return to its established patrol in the North Atlantic.

Before these sinkings, the Gulf of St. Lawrence and St. Lawrence River had been guarded by only four RCN warships, a Bangor-class minesweeper, two Fairmile Marine motor launches and an armed yacht; a clearly inadequate force for the task. The RCN's response to the attacks was to deploy five Flower-class corvettes, but it remained inadequate even with these reinforcements.

The incident revealed that the RCN did not have the resources to deal with the situation and there were political repercussions in Canada with suggestions that RCN ships allocated to the Atlantic convoys should be recalled to protect Canadian territorial waters; however, the RCN's priority remained with the protection of convoys to Britain, the Soviet Union and North Africa.

Several Royal Navy escorts were attached to the RCN for some months during 1942, with convoys in the St. Lawrence River and Gulf of St. Lawrence being formed between RCN facilities at HMCS Chaleur II in Quebec City, HMCS Fort Ramsay in Gaspé, and HMCS Protector in Sydney. Royal Canadian Air Force (RCAF) aircraft carried out operational patrols from RCAF stations such as Mont-Joli, Bagotville, Chatham, Mount Pleasant, Charlottetown, Summerside, Debert, Stanley and Sydney as well as various civilian fields, particularly in the Magdalen Islands.

Residents along the Gaspé coast and the St. Lawrence River and Gulf of St. Lawrence were startled at the sight of maritime warfare off their shores, with ships on fire and explosions rattling their communities, while bodies and debris floated ashore. The Canadian government's wartime secrecy saw censors forbid media reporting of incidents; so the only news came from local gossip. Blackouts were strictly enforced and army units were sent out on coastal patrols along roads and railway lines.

== Summer 1942 ==
In July 1942, Captain Ernst Vogelsang piloted U-132 into the Gulf of St. Lawrence. On 6 July, within half an hour, he sank three ships from the twelve-ship Convoy QS-15: the British registered Dinaric and Hainaut, and the Greek vessel Anastassios Pateras. Eventually depth charge runs by a ship, HMCS Drummondville and four Curtiss P-40 Warhawk aircraft from No. 130 Squadron RCAF damaged the U-boat's ballast pumps and resulted in the loss of 4 m^{3} (25 bbl) of fuel and a few crewmen. This attack drove the submarine to the bottom where it hid for 12 hours. The submarine then rushed out of the gulf for repairs.

In late August, two U-boats made a joint raid on the St. Lawrence. U-517 sank nine ships and damaged another in a two-week period, escaping attacks by escort vessels each time and sinking the Flower-class corvette HMCS Charlottetown on 11 September. U-165 was less successful in attacking merchant shipping but it sank the armed yacht HMCS Raccoon and heavily damaged USS Laramie. Eastern Air Command positioned itself to better defend the remaining convoys by establishing a "Special Submarine Hunting Detachment" of No. 113 Squadron RCAF at Chatham, New Brunswick. They made their first U-boat attack on 9 September, when one of their aircraft dove on U-165, about 32 kilometres (20 mi) south of Anticosti Island. He did not do much damage to the submarine, but subsequent naval and air activity in the area frustrated the U-boat's efforts to attack other convoys. The RCN requested additional forces from Western Local Escort Force, receiving two old Royal Navy destroyers with improved radar to combat the U-boat threat.

Within 24 hours of 24 September, crews from 113 Squadron registered seven sightings and three attacks on U-517. None sank the U-boat. Aircraft continued to harry the submarine as it cruised the gulf with the air attacks badly damaging U-165 along with injuring some submariners inside it. One of the pilots who took part in the attacks, Flying Officer M.J. Bélanger, was later awarded the Distinguished Flying Cross for his efforts.

The continued attacks caused the St. Lawrence River and Gulf of St. Lawrence to be closed to all trans-Atlantic shipping, allowing only coastal trade. In practice, although this embargo strained the Canadian National Railway (CNR) system to Sydney and Halifax, it simplified the management of Atlantic convoys. The embargo lasted until early 1944.

== Fall 1942 ==
On 5 September 1942, U-513, under the command of Kapitänleutnant Rolf Ruggeberg, attacked and sank the merchant vessels SS Lord Strathcona and SS Saganaga. A total of twenty-nine men, who were all on Saganaga, died. On 10 September U-91 attacked Convoy ON 127 along with a number of other submarines and chased them across the Atlantic all the way to the gulf. The submarine sustained minor damage from the warships but managed to sink the destroyer HMCS Ottawa with two torpedoes.

On 14 October, the Newfoundland Railway passenger ferry SS Caribou was torpedoed by U-69, in the Cabot Strait, between Sydney, Nova Scotia, and Port aux Basques, Newfoundland, with many women and children among the 137 dead in her sinking. U-69 escaped a counterattack by the Bangor-class minesweeper HMCS Grandmère.

On 21 October U-43 moved into the entrance of the river and encountered widespread RCN patrols. The submarine's captain, Hans-Joachim Schwantke, attempted to attack convoy SQ 43 off Gaspé, but was spotted and repulsed by the convoy's escorts. It was stated that six depth charges from the Bangor-class minesweeper HMCS Gananoque knocked out the U-boat's lights, blew the battery circuit breaker and activated a torpedo in one of the sub's stern tubes. Captain Schwantke pushed his sub down to 130 metres (430 ft) to avoid what he thought was a coordinated attack. The submarine was damaged but escaped the river.

On 2 November, U-518 sank two iron ore freighters and damaged another at Bell Island in Conception Bay, Newfoundland, en route to a patrol off the Gaspé Peninsula where, despite an attack by an RCAF patrol aircraft, it successfully landed a spy, Werner von Janowski, at New Carlisle, Quebec; he was captured at the New Carlisle railway station shortly after landing on the beach. In November, U-183 was ordered in but turned away because of oppressive Canadian patrols that prevented entry.

U-boat losses experienced by the Kriegsmarine during 1942 following the entry of the United States Navy into the Battle of the Atlantic, coupled with declining German shipbuilding capability to replace battle losses, saw the U-boat fleet redeployed to the primary Atlantic convoy routes to disrupt the Allied war resupply effort; this effectively saw enemy submarines withdrawn from the St. Lawrence River and Gulf of St. Lawrence by the end of 1942.

== 1943 ==
Canadian military intelligence and the Royal Canadian Mounted Police (RCMP) intercepted mail addressed to several Kriegsmarine officers (including Otto Kretschmer) imprisoned at the Camp 30 prisoner of war (POW) camp at Bowmanville, Ontario in early 1943. The correspondence detailed an escape plan in which the prisoners were to tunnel out of the camp and make their way (using currency and false documents provided for them) through eastern Ontario and across Quebec to the northeastern tip of New Brunswick off the Pointe de Maisonnette lighthouse where the escapees would be retrieved by a U-boat.

Canadian authorities did not tip off the POWs and detected signs of tunnel digging at Camp 30. All prisoners except one were arrested at the time of their escape attempt; the sole inmate who managed to escape travelled all the way to Pointe de Maisonette undetected, likely travelling onboard Canadian National Railway passenger trains to the Bathurst area. This POW was apprehended by military police and RCMP on the beach in front of the lighthouse on the night of the planned U-boat extraction. The RCN provided a U-boat counteroffensive force (codenamed "Operation Pointe Maisonnette") that was led by HMCS Rimouski, which was outfitted with an experimental version of diffused lighting camouflage for the operation. The task force led by Rimouski waited in Caraquet Harbour, obscured by Caraquet Island, the night of 26–27 September 1943 and detected the presence of U-536 off Pointe de Maisonnette while shore authorities arrested the POW escapee. U-536 managed to elude the RCN task force by diving just as the surface warships began attacking with depth charges; the submarine was able to escape the Gulf of St. Lawrence without making the extraction.

== 1944 ==
In 1943, the RCAF had begun to successfully harass U-boat operations in Canadian coastal waters and the RCN had grown in numbers and effectiveness to allow more resources to be dedicated to anti-submarine warfare operations in territorial waters. By early 1944, the shipping lanes in the Gulf of St. Lawrence and St. Lawrence River were reopened to domestic and war-related convoys operating primarily from Quebec City to Sydney.

Late 1944 saw a resurgence of U-boat activity in the St. Lawrence River and Gulf of St. Lawrence. German submarines were being equipped with the snorkel, a telescopic engine ventilation system that permitted continuous underwater operation without surfacing.

U-1223 entered the Gulf of St. Lawrence undetected in early October and is credited with seriously damaging the River-class frigate HMCS Magog on 14 October and sinking the Canadian freighter SS Fort Thompson on 2 November. Three weeks later, U-1228 attacked and sank the Flower-class corvette HMCS Shawinigan, a few kilometres off of Channel/Port aux Basque on the night of 24–25 November, with the loss of all 90 crew members, including able seaman Dudley "Red" Garrett, a former Toronto Maple Leafs hockey player. Authorities only realized that it sank when Caribou's replacement ferry, SS Burgeo, sailed into North Sydney without Shawinigan on 25 November, after it had tried numerous times to make contact by radiophone earlier that day. Wreckage was discovered on 27 November, and six crewmen's bodies were recovered. It was the worst case of military deaths in Canadian territory during the war. These two German attacks marked the last actions in the Battle of the St. Lawrence.

In May 1945, following Germany's surrender, U-889 and U-190 surrendered to the RCN at Shelburne, Nova Scotia, and Bay Bulls, Newfoundland, respectively.

After the war, it was shown that the mingling of fresh and salt waters in the region (the world's largest estuary), plus temperature variations and sea ice, disrupted RCN anti-submarine operations and reduced the effectiveness of shipboard sonar systems that were designed to detect submarines. Fog and other weather conditions in the St. Lawrence River and Gulf of St. Lawrence also conspired to hamper RCAF patrols.

== Order of battle ==
=== Canada ===
Canadian Army

Royal Canadian Navy

Frigates

- HMCS Antigonish
- HMCS Coaticook
- HMCS Ettrick
- HMCS Kokanee
- HMCS Lasalle
- HMCS Levis
- HMCS Magog loss
- HMCS Orkney
- HMCS Meon
- HMCS Springhill
- HMCS Ste. Therese
- HMCS Stettler
- HMCS Thetford Mines
- HMCS Toronto

Corvettes

- HMCS Agassiz
- HMCS Amherst
- HMCS Arrowhead
- HMCS Brandon
- HMCS Brantford
- HMCS Camrose
- HMCS Charlottetown sunk
- HMCS Dawson
- HMCS Hepatica
- HMCS Kamloops
- HMCS Kenogami
- HMCS Kitchener
- HMCS La Malbaie
- HMCS Lethbridge
- HMCS Lunenburg
- HMCS Matapedia
- HMCS Midland
- HMCS Nanaimo
- HMCS Norsyd
- HMCS Port Arthur
- HMCS Prescott
- HMCS Quesnel
- HMCS Rivière du Loup
- HMCS Shawinigan sunk
- HMCS Snowberry
- HMCS Summerside
- HMCS Trail
- HMCS Ville de Québec
- HMCS Wetaskiwin
- HMCS Weyburn
- HMCS Woodstock

Minesweepers

- HMCS Brockville
- HMCS Burlington
- HMCS Chedabucto sunk
- HMCS Clayoquot
- HMCS Digby
- HMCS Drummondville
- HMCS Esquimalt
- HMCS Fort William
- HMCS Gananoque
- HMCS Georgian
- HMCS Granby
- HMCS Grandmère
- HMCS Ingonish
- HMCS Kenora
- HMCS Kentville
- HMCS Lachine
- HMCS Lockeport
- HMCS Llewellyn
- HMCS Lloyd George
- HMCS Medicine Hat
- HMCS Melville
- HMCS Milltown
- HMCS Mulgrave
- HMCS Nipigon
- HMCS Noranda
- HMCS Port Hope
- HMCS Red Deer
- HMCS Sarnia
- HMCS Stratford
- HMCS Swift Current
- HMCS Trois Rivières
- HMCS Truro
- HMCS Ungava
- HMCS Vegreville
- HMCS Westmount

Armed yachts

- HMCS Elk
- HMCS Raccoon sunk
- HMCS Reindeer
- HMCS Vison

Auxiliaries

- HMCS French

Motor Launches

- HMC ML Q050
- HMC ML Q051
- HMC ML Q052
- HMC ML Q053
- ML 54
- ML 55
- ML 56
- ML 57
- ML 58
- ML 59
- ML 61
- ML 62
- ML 63
- ML 64
- ML 65
- ML 66
- ML 72
- ML 73
- ML 74
- ML 75
- ML 76
- ML 77
- ML 79
- ML 80
- ML 81
- ML 82
- ML 83
- ML 84
- ML 85
- ML 86
- ML 87
- ML 90
- ML 93
- ML 95
- ML 96
- ML 98
- ML 100
- ML 101
- ML 103
- ML 110
- ML 111
- ML 114
- ML 115
- ML 117
- ML 120
- ML 121

Royal Canadian Air Force

- No. 1 General Reconnaissance School
- No. 5 (Bomber-Reconnaissance) Squadron
- No. 7 Operational Training Unit
- No. 8 (Bomber-Reconnaissance) Squadron
- No. 10 (Bomber-Reconnaissance) Squadron
- No. 11 (Bomber-Reconnaissance) Squadron
- No. 113 (Bomber-Reconnaissance) Squadron
- No. 116 (Bomber-Reconnaissance) Squadron
- No. 117 (Bomber-Reconnaissance) Squadron
- No. 119 (Bomber-Reconnaissance) Squadron
- No. 130 (Fighter) Squadron
- No. 145 (Bomber-Reconnaissance) Squadron
- No. 160 (Bomber-Reconnaissance) Squadron
- No. 161 (Bomber-Reconnaissance) Squadron
- No. 162 (Bomber-Reconnaissance) Squadron

=== United Kingdom ===
- HMS Salisbury
- HMS Witherington
- HMS Chelsea

Royal Air Force

- No. 31 Operational Training Unit RAF
- No. 31 General Reconnaissance School

=== Germany ===
Kriegsmarine

U-boats

- U-43
- U-69
- U-106
- U-132
- U-165
- U-213
- U-262
- U-517
- U-518
- U-536
- U-537
- U-538
- U-541
- U-553
- U-802
- U-1223
- U-1228

== Aftermath ==
In 1999, 55 years after the battle, the Governor General of Canada unveiled a monument to commemorate the 55th anniversary of the battle. The monument was erected in Halifax, and has the names of all the sailors that were lost in the battle. The battle is remembered in other ways, too. For example, in 2005, Veterans Affairs published a book on all the events in the battle. This book and others can educate and inform the population about the role Canadians played in the Battle of the Saint Lawrence.

== See also ==
- Attacks on North America during World War II
- Military history of Nova Scotia
- Convoys SG-6/LN-6
- Convoy QS-33
- Convoy SQ-36
- Convoy LN-7

== References and further reading ==
=== Bibliography ===
- Blair, Clay (1996). Hitler's U-Boat War: The Hunters 1939–1942. Random House. ISBN 0-394-58839-8.
- Granatstein, J.L.; Oliver, Dean F. (2011). The Oxford Companion to Canadian Military History. Don Mills, ON: Oxford University Press Canada. ISBN 978-0-19-543088-2.
- Greenfield, Nathan M. (2004). The battle of the St. Lawrence: the Second World War in Canada. Toronto: HarperCollins. p. 286. ISBN 978-0-0020-0664-4.
- Hadley, Michael (1985). U-Boats Against Canada: German Submarines in Canadian Waters. McGill-Queen's University Press. ISBN 978-0-7735-0801-9.
- How, Douglas (1988). Night of the Caribou. Hantsport, Nova Scotia: Lancelot Press. ISBN 978-0-88999-410-2.
- Milner, Marc (2010). Canada's Navy: the first century (2nd ed.). Toronto: University of Toronto. ISBN 978-0-8020-9604-3.
- Rohwer, J.; Hummelchen, G. (1992). Chronology of the War at Sea 1939–1945. Naval Institute Press. ISBN 1-55750-105-X.
- Runyan, Timothy J.; Copes, Jan M. (1994). To Die Gallantly. Westview Press. ISBN 0-8133-2332-0.
- Sarty, Roger F. (2012). War in the St. Lawerance: The Forgotten U-boat Battles on Canada's Shores. Toronto: Allen Lane. ISBN 978-0-670-06787-9.
- Tennyson, Brian Douglas; Sarty, Roger F. (2000). Guardian of the Gulf: Sydney, Cape Breton, and the Atlantic wars. Toronto: University of Toronto Press. ISBN 978-0-8020-4492-1. "Guardian of the Gulf : Sydney, Cape Breton, and the Atlantic wars."
- Veterans Affairs Canada (2005). The Battle of the Gulf of St. Lawrence. Ottawa: Her Majesty the Queen in Right of Canada represented by the Minister of Veterans Affairs.
