= HMCS Lévis =

Several Canadian naval units have been named HMCS Lévis after Lévis, Quebec.

- HMCS Lévis (K115) (I), a Flower-class corvette commissioned on 16 May 1941 and torpedoed and sunk south of Cape Farewell on 19 September 1941.
- HMCS Lévis (K400) (II), a River-class frigate commissioned on 21 July 1944 and decommissioned on 21 February 1946.

== Battle honours ==
- Atlantic 1941, 1944–45
- Gulf of St. Lawrence 1944
