= HMCS Lachine =

History

Canada
- Name: Lachine
- Namesake: Lachine, Quebec
- Builder: Davie Shipbuilding, Lauzon
- Laid down: 27 December 1940
- Launched: 14 June 1941
- Commissioned: 20 June 1942
- Decommissioned: 31 July 1945
- Identification: Pennant number: J266
- Honours and awards: Gulf of St. Lawrence 1942, Atlantic 1942-45
- Fate: Sold for conversion to a salvage tug, 1945

General characteristics
- Class & type: Bangor-class minesweeper
- Displacement: 592 long tons (601 t)
- Length: 162 ft (49.4 m)
- Beam: 28 ft (8.5 m)
- Draught: 8.25 ft (2.51 m)
- Propulsion: 2 shafts, 9-cylinder diesel, 2,000 bhp (1,500 kW)
- Speed: 16 knots (30 km/h)
- Complement: 83
- Armament: 1 × QF 12-pounder 12 cwt naval gun; 1 × QF 2-pounder Mark VIII; 2 × QF 20 mm Oerlikon guns; 40 depth charges as escort

HMCS Lachine was a Bangor-class minesweeper of the Royal Canadian Navy that served during the Second World War. Following the war a proposed transfer to the Royal Canadian Mounted Police as Starnes was cancelled, and the ship was instead sold for conversion to a salvage tug in 1945. The ship was broken up in the United Kingdom in 1955.

== Design and description ==
The Bangor class was initially to be a scaled down minesweeper design of the Halcyon class in Royal Navy service. However, due to the difficulty procuring diesel engines led to the small number of the diesel version being completed. The ships displaced 592 long tons (601 t) standard and 690 long tons (700 t) fully loaded. They were 162 feet (49.4 m) long with a beam of 28 feet (8.5 m) and a draught of 8 feet 3 inches (2.51 m). However, the size of the ship led to criticisms of their being too cramped for magnetic or acoustic minesweeping gear. This may have been due to all the additions made during the war with the installation of ASDIC, radar and depth charges.

The Bangor class came in two versions. Lachine was of the diesel-powered version, being equipped with a 9-cylinder diesel engine driving two shafts that produced 2,000 brake horsepower (1,500 kW). This gave the ship a maximum speed of 16.5 knots (30.6 km/h). The vessels carried 65 long tons (66 t) of oil. The vessels had a complement of 6 officers and 77 ratings.

The Canadian diesel-powered Bangors were armed with a single quick-firing (QF) 12-pounder 12 cwt gun mounted forward. (Note: "Cwt" is the abbreviation for hundredweight, 20 cwt referring to the weight of the gun.) Initially the design called for a 4-inch (102 mm) gun, however these were replaced with 12-pounder guns. The ships were also fitted with a QF 2-pounder Mark VIII gun aft and were eventually fitted with single-mounted QF 20 mm Oerlikon guns on the bridge wings. For those ships assigned to convoy duty, they were armed with two depth charge launchers and two chutes to deploy the 40 depth charges they carried.

== Service history ==
The minesweeper was ordered as part of the 1940–41 building programme. Her keel was laid down by Davie Shipbuilding at Lauzon, Quebec on 27 December 1940, and launched on 20 June 1942. Lachine was commissioned into the Royal Canadian Navy at Quebec City on 20 June 1942 with the pennant number J266.

Following workups, the ship was assigned to Sydney Force, a local escort force operating out of Sydney, Nova Scotia in September 1942. In October, the ship was transferred to the Western Local Escort Force. In January 1943 the Western Local Escort Force organized its escorts into groups. Lachine joined 24.18.3 alongside the corvettes Moncton and Nanaimo. In June, when the force was restructured, the minesweeper joined the escort group W-6. The ship transferred to Halifax Force, a local escort force operating out of Halifax, Nova Scotia, from June 1944 until the end of the war in Europe.

On 31 July 1945, Lachine was paid off at Shelburne, Nova Scotia and laid up for disposal. Following the war the ship was intended to be transferred to the marine section of the Royal Canadian Mounted Police as Starnes, however, the transfer was cancelled. Sources disagree on what happened to the ship after that. According to Macpherson & Barrie and Miramar state the ship was instead sold for conversion to a salvage tug in 1945. The conversion was completed in 1946, the ship retaining her name and remained in service until 1955 when Lachine was broken up for scrap in 1955. However, Colledge claims the ship was converted to the tug Jacks Bay in 1952. According to Macpherson & Barrie and Miramar, this was the name that HMCS Grandmère took after her conversion.
