= HMCS Burlington =

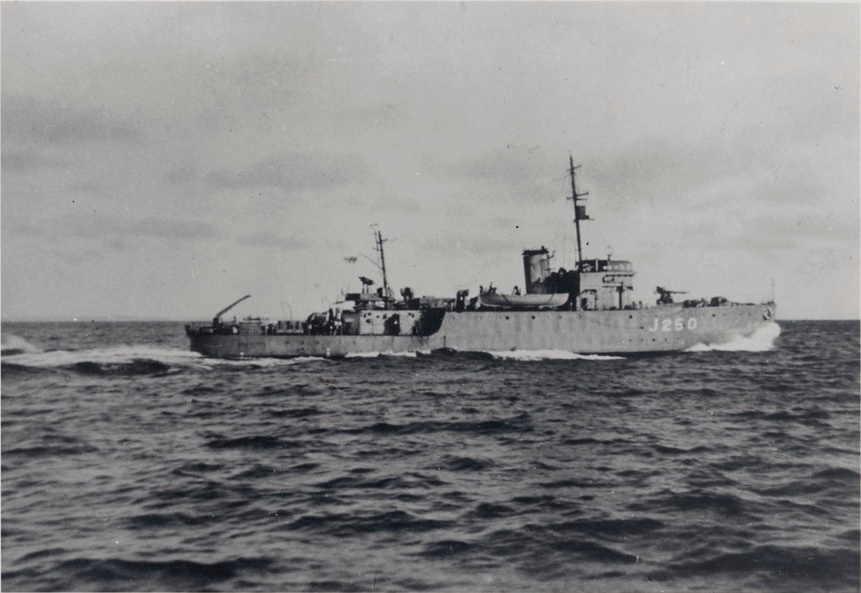
- Burlington underway

History

Canada
- Name: Burlington
- Namesake: Burlington, Ontario
- Builder: Dufferin Shipbuilding Co., Toronto
- Laid down: 4 July 1940
- Launched: 23 November 1940
- Commissioned: 6 September 1941
- Decommissioned: 30 October 1945
- Identification: Pennant number: J250
- Honours and awards: Atlantic 1942-44, Gulf of St. Lawrence 1942
- Fate: Broken up 1946

General characteristics
- Class & type: Bangor-class minesweeper
- Displacement: 672 long tons (683 t)
- Length: 180 ft (54.9 m) oa
- Beam: 28 ft 6 in (8.7 m)
- Draught: 9 ft 9 in (3.0 m)
- Propulsion: 2 Admiralty 3-drum water tube boilers, 2 shafts, vertical triple-expansion reciprocating engines, 2,400 ihp (1,790 kW)
- Speed: 16.5 knots (31 km/h)
- Complement: 83
- Armament: 1 x QF 3 in (76 mm) 20 cwt gun; 1 x QF 2 pdr Mark VIII; 2 × QF 20 mm Oerlikon guns; 40 depth charges as escort

HMCS Burlington (pennant J250) was a Bangor-class minesweeper constructed for the Royal Canadian Navy during the Second World War. The minesweeper entered service in 1941 and took part in the Battle of the Atlantic and the Battle of the St. Lawrence as a convoy escort. The ship was decommissioned in 1945 and sold in 1946. The vessel was broken up for scrap in 1946.

== Design and description ==
A British design, the Bangor-class minesweepers were smaller than the preceding Halcyon-class minesweepers in British service, but larger than the Fundy class in Canadian service. They came in two versions powered by different engines; those with a diesel engines and those with vertical triple-expansion steam engines. Burlington was of the latter design and was larger than her diesel-engined cousins. Burlington was 180 feet (54.9 m) long overall, had a beam of 28 feet 6 inches (8.7 m) and a draught of 9 feet 9 inches (3.0 m). The minesweeper had a displacement of 672 long tons (683 t). She had a complement of 6 officers and 77 enlisted.

Burlington had two vertical triple-expansion steam engines, each driving one shaft, using steam provided by two Admiralty three-drum boilers. The engines produced a total of 2,400 indicated horsepower (1,800 kW) and gave a maximum speed of 16.5 knots (30.6 km/h; 19.0 mph). The minesweeper could carry a maximum of 150 long tons (152 t) of fuel oil.

The minesweeper was armed initially with a single quick-firing (QF) 4-inch (102 mm)/40 caliber Mk IV gun mounted forward that was later replaced with a single QF 3-inch (76 mm) 20 cwt gun mounted forward. (Note: "Cwt" is the abbreviation for hundredweight, 20 cwt referring to the weight of the gun.) The ship was also fitted with a QF 2-pounder Mark VIII aft and was eventually fitted with single-mounted QF 20 mm Oerlikon guns on the bridge wings. Those ships assigned to convoy duty were armed with two depth charge launchers and four chutes to deploy their 40 depth charges.

== Operational history ==
The minesweeper was ordered as part of the 1939–40 building programme. The ship's keel was laid down on 4 July 1940 by Dufferin Shipbuilding at their yard in Toronto, Ontario. Burlington was launched on 23 November 1940 and commissioned into the Royal Canadian Navy on 6 September 1941 at Toronto.

The ship arrived at Halifax, Nova Scotia in September 1941 and remained part of the local force until March 1942 when Burlington transferred to the Western Local Escort Force (WLEF) as a convoy escort in the Battle of the Atlantic. During the night of 11/12 January 1942, SS Cyclops was torpedoed by the German U-boat U-123 125 miles (201 km) southeast Cape Sable Island. Burlington and sister ship Red Deer were sent to aid the stricken. While Red Deer aided the survivors, Burlington unsuccessfully searched for the submarine.

In May 1942, the minesweeper was reassigned to the Gulf Escort Force, escorting convoys through the Gulf of St. Lawrence. Burlington, with the corvette Arrowhead and sister ship Medicine Hat, escorted the first Quebec – Sydney convoy, QS 1, through the gulf. Following the closure of the St. Lawrence River and the Gulf of St. Lawrence to shipping in September following a series of successful U-boat attacks, a special convoy comprising twelve merchants was escorted by Burlington and Red Deer sailed from Sydney to Quebec City. The convoy avoided the main shipping lanes and arrived safely. The successful sailing of this convoy and its sequel gave the Royal Canadian Navy the confidence to reopen the gulf to merchant shipping again in October. On 21 October the convoy SQ 43 was spotted by U-43 west of Cap-Chat, Quebec. The convoy was escorted by Burlington, Gananoque and two Fairmile motor launches. The submarine was damaged in a counterattack by Gananoque and forced to break off its attack. On 6 November, the minesweeper was sent to search for a U-boat that had landed an Abwehr agent in Quebec. The agent was captured but the submarine was not intercepted.

In December 1942, Burlington began a refit that was done piecemeal at Halifax, Lunenburg, Nova Scotia and Dartmouth, Nova Scotia that took until May 1943 to complete. After working up, the minesweeper was assigned to WLEF, joining the convoy escort group W9. Burlington remained with the group until February 1944 when she transferred to the Halifax Local Defence Force as a local patrol and escort vessel.

In October 1944, Burlington joined Newfoundland Force operating from St. John's, Newfoundland, remaining with the unit until 8 June 1945 when it was disbanded. The minesweeper was then assigned miscellaneous duties until being paid off on 30 October 1945. Following the war, the minesweeper was sold to T. Harris of New Jersey in 1946 and broken up for scrap.
