= K218 =

K218 or K-218 may refer to:

- K-218 (Kansas highway), a state highway spur route in Kansas
- HMCS Brantford (K218), a former UK Royal Navy ship
- Violin Concerto No. 4 (Mozart) in D major, K. 218
