= Fort Ramsay =

Coordinates: 48.825°N 64.444°W

HMCS Fort Ramsay was a Royal Canadian Navy (RCN) base located at Sandy Beach on the southern shore of Gaspé Bay, several kilometres east of Gaspé, Quebec. Its construction was commissioned in 1940 and the base was inaugurated by the RCN on May 1, 1942. Several shore batteries were linked to this base, such as Fort Prével, Fort Haldimand, and Fort Péninsule. On March 31, 1946, the base was decommissioned, almost a year after the Second World War ended. Today the base property is operated as the Sandy Beach Terminal of the Port of Gaspé and is primarily used for industrial and commercial purposes.

== History ==
The Gaspé area played a big role during the war. Gaspé Bay was strategically located near the mouth of the St. Lawrence River and was considered a very suitable place for harbouring merchant ships and allied warships, such as the British fleet in case Great Britain would be invaded. The depth and the shape of the bay allowed for maximum accessibility and defence. This mandate was given by the Department of National Defence in early 1940 and the RCN's High Command worked on top-secret plans for procedures to defend shipping by convoy escorts in the Gulf of St. Lawrence and St. Lawrence River. Throughout the year many army, navy and air force bases were constructed along the St. Lawrence River between Gaspé and Montreal. HMCS Vison was the first navy vessel to operate from Gaspé, starting from October 1940, but returned to Sydney, Nova Scotia (HMCS Protector) later and was replaced by HMCS Venning. Together with the armed yachts HMCS Reindeer, HMCS Raccoon and HMCS Lynx, these vessels formed the extent of the RCN's fleet based at HMCS Fort Ramsay. The base also supported other RCN warships operating in the Gulf of St. Lawrence throughout the war.

After the first sightings of German U-boats in the waters near Newfoundland and Nova Scotia in 1941, facilities at HMCS Fort Ramsay were augmented. This included construction of the outlying batteries along the shore around the bay as well as a submarine net. The base's inauguration ceremony was held on May 1, 1942, witnessed by a crew of thirteen officers and nearly sixty men from the 1st Battalion of Les Fusiliers du S^{t}-Laurent. On December 14, 1942, Ottawa appointed the 3rd Battalion of Les Fusiliers du S^{t}-Laurent to HMCS Fort Ramsay, which would grow to 34 officers and 291 men at the end of that year. Construction continued until 1943 which saw around 2000 soldiers, airmen and sailors fortifying the bay.

One week after the official opening, the first U-boats were observed in the Gulf of St. Lawrence. This marked the beginning of the Battle of the St. Lawrence, which was fought intensely until the U-boats generally withdrew in late 1942, though some sinkings occurred in the area through late 1944.

By the end of 1944 the situation in Europe had evolved to the advantage of the allies and by October 1 of that year the first shore batteries at HMCS Fort Ramsay began to be dismantled. On March 31, 1946, the last remaining regiment, the Gaspé-Bonaventure Regiment (the 3rd Battalion of Les Fusiliers du S^{t}-Laurent having changed their name in August 1944) was officially disbanded. In total 26 ships were torpedoed by German submarines in the Battle of the St. Lawrence.

== Fort Péninsule ==
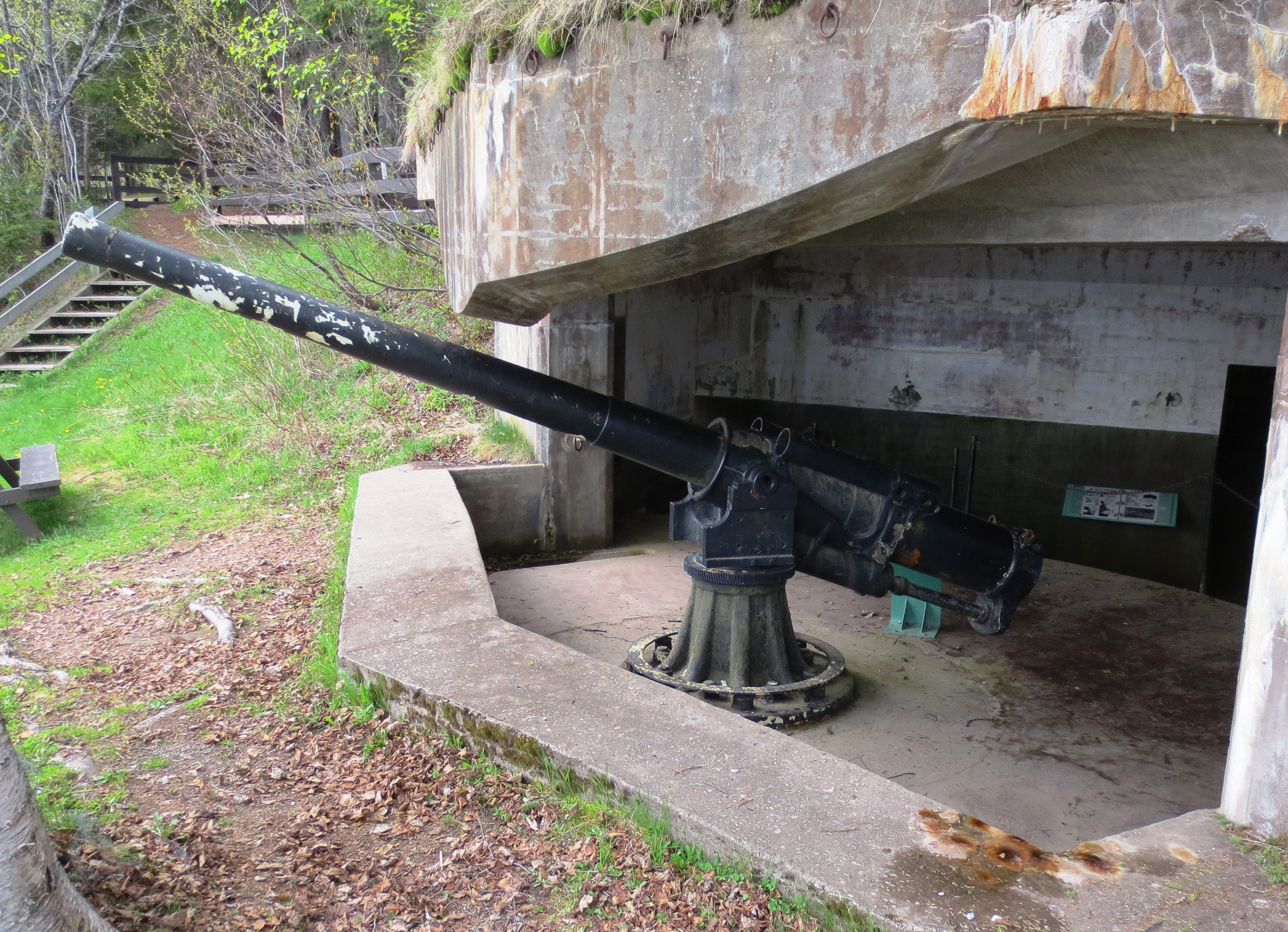
One of two surviving QF 4.7-inch B Mark IV* guns at Fort Péninsule, Forillon National Park, Quebec.

Fort Péninsule was a shore battery affiliated with HMCS Fort Ramsay that was located on the north shore of the bay, near the southern entrance to what is now Forillon National Park. It was equipped with four 60 inches (1,500 mm) searchlights, two 4.7-inch (120 mm) guns and several storage rooms. Located along the main road passing nearby Boulevard Forillon (Route 132) were 15 buildings to house personnel. The site is now open to the public with no entry fee. Two QF 4.7-inch B Mark IV* guns are still displayed in their original casemated positions. According to information displayed on site this station was able to sink any ship or submarine in the bay within 15 seconds after it was spotted.

== Fort Prével ==
Fort Prével was on the south shore of the bay opposite Fort Péninsule, on what is now the Auberge et Golf Fort Prével. During World War II it was armed with two ex-US 10-inch (254 mm) guns, one on a disappearing carriage and one on a barbette carriage. One of two QF 4.7-inch B Mark IV* guns (120 mm), the same type as at Fort Péninsule, is displayed. It is mounted upside down on the carriage.
