= HMCS Gananoque =

Royal Canadian Navy minesweeper

History

Canada
- Name: Gananoque
- Namesake: Gananoque, Ontario
- Builder: Dufferin Shipbuilding Co., Toronto
- Laid down: 15 January 1941
- Launched: 23 April 1941
- Commissioned: 8 November 1941
- Decommissioned: 13 October 1945
- Identification: Pennant number: J259
- Honours and awards: Atlantic 1942–45, Gulf of St. Lawrence 1942
- Fate: Sold for scrap 1959

General characteristics
- Class & type: Bangor-class minesweeper
- Displacement: 672 long tons (683 t)
- Length: 180 ft (54.9 m) oa
- Beam: 28 ft 6 in (8.7 m)
- Draught: 9 ft 9 in (3.0 m)
- Propulsion: 2 Admiralty 3-drum water tube boilers, 2 shafts, vertical triple-expansion reciprocating engines, 2,400 ihp (1,790 kW)
- Speed: 16.5 knots (31 km/h)
- Complement: 83
- Armament: 1 x QF 3-inch (76 mm) 20 cwt gun; 1 x QF 2 pdr Mark VIII; 2 × QF 20 mm Oerlikon guns; 40 depth charges as escort

HMCS Gananoque (pennant J259) was a Bangor-class minesweeper constructed for the Royal Canadian Navy during the Second World War. Named for the town of Gananoque, Ontario situated on the Saint Lawrence River, the minesweeper entered service in 1941 and participated in the Battle of the Atlantic and the Battle of the Saint Lawrence, mainly as a convoy escort. Following the end of the war in 1945 Gananoque was decommissioned and placed in reserve. The vessel was reacquired in 1952, but never reentered service and was sold for scrap in 1959 and broken up.

== Design and description ==
A British design, the Bangor-class minesweepers were smaller than the preceding Halcyon-class minesweepers in British service, but larger than the Fundy class in Canadian service. They came in two versions powered by different engines; those with a diesel engines and those with vertical triple-expansion steam engines. Gananoque was of the latter design and was larger than her diesel-engined cousins. Gananoque was 180 feet (54.9 m) long overall, had a beam of 28 feet 6 inches (8.7 m) and a draught of 9 feet 9 inches (3.0 m). The minesweeper had a displacement of 672 long tons (683 t). She had a complement of 6 officers and 77 enlisted.

Gananoque had two vertical triple-expansion steam engines, each driving one shaft, using steam provided by two Admiralty three-drum boilers. The engines produced a total of 2,400 indicated horsepower (1,800 kW) and gave a maximum speed of 16.5 knots (30.6 km/h; 19.0 mph). The minesweeper could carry a maximum of 150 long tons (152 t) of fuel oil.

The minesweeper was armed with a single quick-firing (QF) 3-inch (76 mm) 20 cwt gun mounted forward. (Note: "Cwt" is the abbreviation for hundredweight, 20 cwt referring to the weight of the gun.) The ships were also fitted with a QF 2-pounder Mark VIII aft and were eventually fitted with single-mounted QF 20 mm Oerlikon guns on the bridge wings. Those ships assigned to convoy duty were armed with two depth charge launchers and four chutes to deploy their 40 depth charges. Gananoque was equipped with LL and SA minesweeping gear to counter magnetic and acoustic naval mines.

== Operational history ==
Ordered as part of the 1940–41 building programme, the minesweeper's keel was laid down on 15 January 1941 by Dufferin Shipbuilding Co. at their yard in Toronto, Ontario. Gananoque was launched on 23 April 1941 and commissioned at Toronto on 8 November 1941.

The minesweeper sailed to Halifax, Nova Scotia, where Gananoque was assigned to Halifax Force, the local patrol and convoy escort force. The ship then transferred to St. John's Local Defence Force based at St. John's, Newfoundland. During the Battle of the Saint Lawrence, Gananoque was assigned to the Gulf Escort Force, tasked with escorting convoys through the Gulf of St. Lawrence and the St. Lawrence River. With sister ship Burlington and two Fairmile B motor launches, Gananoque was escorting the Sydney-Quebec convoy SQ 43 comprising three merchant vessels in October 1942 when they made contact with U-43 west of Cap-Chat on the Gaspé Peninsula. Gananoque dropped depth charges on the submarine, doing some damage to the U-boat and forcing the submarine to break off its attack on the convoy. The minesweeper transferred to Sydney Force, the local patrol and escort force operating out of Sydney, Nova Scotia.

In January 1943 Gananoque was assigned to the Western Local Escort Force as part of group 24.18.6 which also included the destroyer Hamilton and the corvettes Brantford and Dundas as a convoy escort in the Battle of the Atlantic. In May, Gananoque underwent a refit at Quebec City, Quebec. In July, the minesweeper rejoined Halifax Force, transferring to Sydney Force in May 1944. In July 1944, the ship underwent a second refit, this time at Charlottetown, Prince Edward Island, taking eight weeks to complete. In February 1945, the minesweeper joined Newfoundland Force based at St. John's and remained with the group until it was disbanded in June. Gananoque joined Atlantic Coast Command until being paid off at Sydney on 13 October 1945. The vessel was taken to Shelburne, Nova Scotia and placed in reserve.

The minesweeper lay in reserve until reacquired during the Korean War in 1952 and given the new hull number 181. However, the ship was not recommissioned and Gananoque was sold for scrap to Marine Industries in February 1959 and broken up.
