= Battle of Bell Island =

1942 German attack in Newfoundland in WWII

- Part of the American theatre and the Battle of the St. Lawrence of World War II
Date	September 4 – November 2, 1942
Location	Bell Island, Dominion of Newfoundland
Result	Indecisive

Belligerents
Canada; Newfoundland	Germany

Commanders and leaders
	Kapitänleutnant Rolf Ruggeberg; Kapitänleutnant Friedrich Wissmann; Werner von Janowski

Strength
SS Lord Strathcona; SS Saganaga; SS Evelyn B SS Anna T Flyingdale; SS Rose Castle; PLM 27; HMCS Drumheller; 2 Fairmile fast motor boats	U-513; U-518

Casualties and losses
SS Lord Strathcona; SS Saganaga(29 killed); SS Evelyn B SS Rose Castle (28 killed); PLM 27 (12 killed)	Spy captured

In 1942, German U-boats attacked Bell Island twice which led to four cargo ships being sunk, and more than 60 sailors killed. This made it one of the few places in the Dominion of Newfoundland that came under attack during the Second World War. These engagements are considered a part of a larger battle, the Battle of the Atlantic. Bell Island is in Conception Bay, Newfoundland and the waters were part of an important Atlantic convoy route that allowed supplies to flow from the United States to its Allies in Europe. Many ships brought supplies in these waters to Allied troops, but many of them were cut off by the German U-boats.

== German U-boat attacks ==
On the night of 4 September 1942 the German submarine, U-513, under the command of Kapitänleutnant Rolf Ruggeberg, followed the iron ore carrier Evelyn B to Conception Bay. There, the U-boat spent the night at a depth of 20 metres (66 ft). The next morning on 5 September, U-513 attacked and sank SS Lord Strathcona and SS Saganaga. Twenty-nine sailors aboard Saganaga died. Right after the attack, U-513 left the area following Evelyn B again. On 2 November at 3 a.m., the waters off Bell Island saw a second attack, this time executed by U-518. Commanded by Kapitänleutnant Friedrich Wissmann, the U-boat was at the southern end of Bell Island in an area known as "The Tickle," also known as Wabana Anchorage. Over the course of an hour, she fired a torpedo at the 3,000-gross register ton Anna T. The torpedo missed and went under SS Flydingdale which then exploded towards the loading dock. This explosion startled many in Bell Island. Wissman fired twice more. The torpedoes went straight towards SS Rose Castle, and the ship immediately sank, killing twenty-eight men.

The Free French ship Paris Lyon Marseille 27 was also attacked, and right after being struck, sank with 12 of her crew aboard. U-518 then escaped even though there were two patrol vessels nearby. The whole attack lasted ten minutes. The Governor of Newfoundland, Sir Humphrey Walwyn, was angered by these sinkings. Upon his return to St. John's, he called the Chief of Staff, Captain F. L. Houghton, and said "It was madness to let ships lie unprotected."

== Aftermath ==
The result of the attacks was indecisive. Many Newfoundlanders witnessed the aftermath of the raids. Relics of the coastal defences that remained in place after the war serve as a monument recognizing the battle.
