= No. 161 Squadron RCAF =

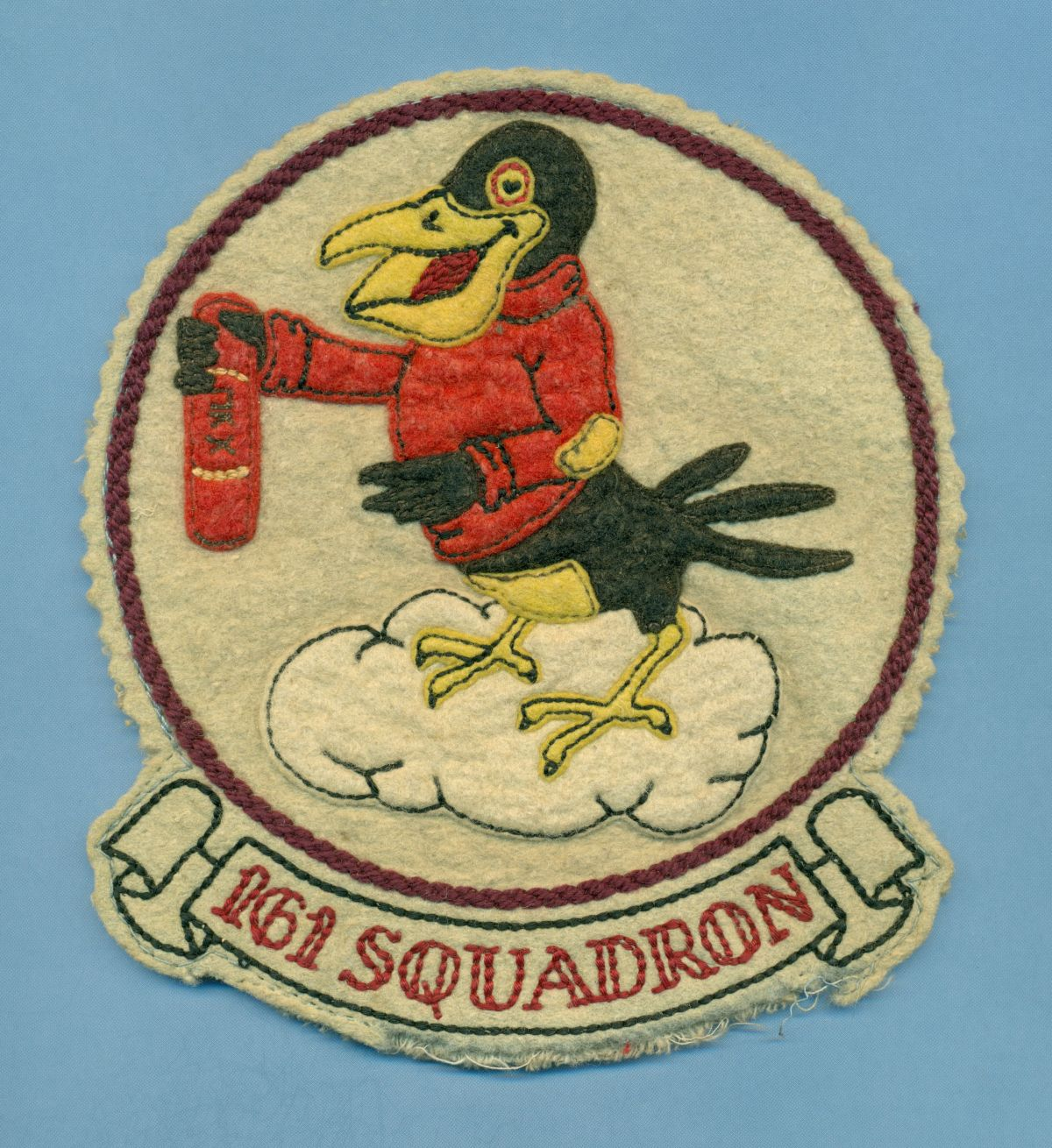
- A WWII jacket patch for the RCAF 161 Bomber Reconnaissance Squadron at Dartmouth, NS
- Active: 1943-1945
- Disbanded: 31 May 1945
- Country: Canada
- Allegiance: Canada
- Branch: Royal Canadian Air Force
- Role: Bomber Reconnaissance
- Part of: RCAF Eastern Air Command
- Engagements: Second World War: Battle of the Atlantic; Battle of the St. Lawrence
- Battle honours: North-West Atlantic 1943-1945

No. 161 (Bomber Reconnaissance) Squadron was a Royal Canadian Air Force squadron that was active during the Second World War. It was primarily deployed in an anti-submarine role and was based at Dartmouth, Nova Scotia. The squadron flew the Digby and Canso before disbanding on 31 May 1945.

== See also ==
- RCAF Eastern Air Command
