= HMCS Springhill =

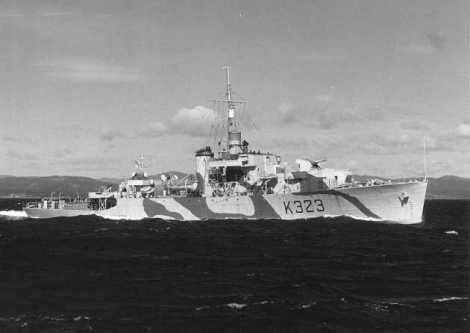
- HMCS Springhill

History

Canada
- Name: Springhill
- Namesake: Springhill, Nova Scotia
- Operator: Royal Canadian Navy
- Ordered: June 1942
- Builder: Yarrows, Esquimalt
- Laid down: 5 May 1943
- Launched: 7 September 1943
- Commissioned: 21 March 1944
- Decommissioned: 1 December 1945
- Identification: pennant number: K 323
- Honours and awards: Gulf of St. Lawrence 1944
- Fate: Sold, scrapped 1947

General characteristics
- Class & type: River-class frigate
- Displacement: 1,445 long tons (1,468 t; 1,618 short tons); 2,110 long tons (2,140 t; 2,360 short tons) (deep load)
- Length: 283 ft (86.26 m) p/p; 301.25 ft (91.82 m)o/a
- Beam: 36.5 ft (11.13 m)
- Draught: 9 ft (2.74 m); 13 ft (3.96 m) (deep load)
- Propulsion: 2 x Admiralty 3-drum boilers, 2 shafts, reciprocating vertical triple expansion, 5,500 ihp (4,100 kW)
- Speed: 20 knots (37.0 km/h); 20.5 knots (38.0 km/h) (turbine ships)
- Range: 646 long tons (656 t; 724 short tons) oil fuel; 7,500 nautical miles (13,890 km) at 15 knots (27.8 km/h)
- Complement: 157
- Armament: 2 × QF 4 in (102 mm) /45 Mk. XVI on twin mount HA/LA Mk.XIX; 1 × QF 12 pdr (3 in (76 mm)) 12 cwt /40 Mk. V on mounting HA/LA Mk.IX (not all ships); 8 × 20 mm QF Oerlikon A/A on twin mounts Mk.V; 1 × Hedgehog 24 spigot A/S projector; up to 150 depth charges

HMCS Springhill was a River-class frigate that served with the Royal Canadian Navy during the Second World War. She served primarily as a convoy escort in the Battle of the Atlantic, mainly in the Battle of the St. Lawrence. She was named for Springhill, Nova Scotia.

Springhill was ordered in June 1942 as part of the 1942–1943 River-class building program. She was laid down on 5 May 1943 by Yarrows Ltd. at Esquimalt and launched 7 September later that year. She was commissioned into the Royal Canadian Navy on 21 March 1944 at Victoria, British Columbia.

== Background ==
The River-class frigate was designed by William Reed of Smith's Dock Company of South Bank-on-Tees. Originally called a "twin-screw corvette", its purpose was to improve on the convoy escort classes in service with the Royal Navy at the time, including the Flower-class corvette. The first orders were placed by the Royal Navy in 1940 and the vessels were named for rivers in the United Kingdom, giving name to the class. In Canada they were named for towns and cities though they kept the same designation. The name "frigate" was suggested by Vice-Admiral Percy Nelles of the Royal Canadian Navy and was adopted later that year.

Improvements over the corvette design included improved accommodation which was markedly better. The twin engines gave only three more knots of speed but extended the range of the ship to nearly double that of a corvette at 7,200 nautical miles (13,300 km) at 12 knots. Among other lessons applied to the design was an armament package better designed to combat U-boats including a twin 4-inch mount forward and 12-pounder aft. 15 Canadian frigates were initially fitted with a single 4-inch gun forward but with the exception of HMCS Valleyfield, they were all eventually upgraded to the double mount. For underwater targets, the River-class frigate was equipped with a Hedgehog anti-submarine mortar and depth charge rails aft and four side-mounted throwers.

River-class frigates were the first Royal Canadian Navy warships to carry the 147B Sword horizontal fan echo sonar transmitter in addition to the irregular ASDIC. This allowed the ship to maintain contact with targets even while firing unless a target was struck. Improved radar and direction-finding equipment improved the RCN's ability to find and track enemy submarines over the previous classes.

Canada originally ordered the construction of 33 frigates in October 1941. The design was too big for the shipyards on the Great Lakes so all the frigates built in Canada were built in dockyards along the west coast or along the St. Lawrence River. In all Canada ordered the construction of 60 frigates including ten for the Royal Navy that transferred two to the United States Navy.

== War service ==
After transiting to Halifax, Springhill was sent to Bermuda in June 1944 to work up. Upon her return she was assigned to escort group EG 16 as a local escort based out of Halifax. She was made Senior Officer's Ship upon joining the group in August 1944. With this unit she fought in the Battle of the St. Lawrence. She remained with the group until March 1945, when she was ordered to Derry, but quickly returned in April to undergo a tropicalization refit in preparation for service in the southern Pacific Ocean. This meant installing water-cooling and refrigeration abilities and changing the camouflage pattern.

The refit began in May 1945 at Pictou, Nova Scotia and completed in October. However, by that point Japan had surrendered and Springhill was paid off at Halifax on 1 December 1945 and laid up in Bedford Basin. In 1947 she was sold and taken to Sydney, Nova Scotia for breaking up.
