= HMCS Fort William =

Two Canadian naval units have been named HMCS Fort William.

- HMCS Fort William (K236) (I) was a Second World War Flower-class corvette renamed La Malbaie before commissioning.
- HMCS Fort William (J311) (II) was a Second World War Bangor-class minesweeper sold to Turkey in 1957 and renamed Bodrum.
