= HMCS Midland =

Flower-class corvette

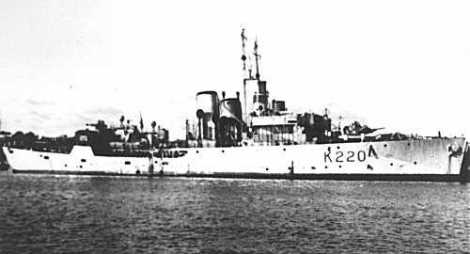
- HMCS Midland

History

Canada
- Name: Midland
- Namesake: Midland, Ontario
- Builder: Midland Shipyards Ltd., Midland
- Laid down: 24 February 1941
- Launched: 25 June 1941
- Commissioned: 17 November 1942
- Decommissioned: 15 July 1945
- Identification: Pennant number: K220
- Honours and awards: Atlantic 1942–45; Gulf of St. Lawrence 1944
- Fate: Scrapped 1946

General characteristics
- Class & type: Flower-class corvette
- Displacement: 950 long tons (970 t; 1,060 short tons)
- Length: 203 ft (61.87 m)
- Beam: 33 ft (10.06 m)
- Draught: 13 ft (3.96 m)
- Propulsion: single shaft; 2 × water tube boilers; 1 × double acting triple-expansion reciprocating steam engine; 2,750 ihp (2,050 kW)
- Speed: 16.5 knots (30.6 km/h)
- Range: 3,500 nautical miles (6,482 km) at 12 knots (22.2 km/h)
- Complement: 5 officers, 61 men
- Sensors & processing systems: 1 × SW1C or 2C radar; 1 × Type 123A or Type 127DV sonar
- Armament: 1 × BL 4 in (102 mm) Mk.IX single gun; 1 × 2-pounder Mk.VIII single "pom-pom"; 4 × Mk.II depth charge throwers; 2 depth charge rails with 60 depth charges

HMCS Midland was a Flower-class corvette that served with the Royal Canadian Navy during the Second World War. She fought primarily in the Battle of the Atlantic. She was named for Midland, Ontario.

== Background ==
Flower-class corvettes like Midland serving with the Royal Canadian Navy during the Second World War differed from earlier and more traditional sail-driven corvettes. The "corvette" designation was created by the French as a class of small warships; the Royal Navy borrowed the term for a period but discontinued its use in 1877. During the hurried preparations for war in the late 1930s, Winston Churchill reactivated the corvette class, needing a name for smaller ships used in an escort capacity, in this case based on a whaling ship design. The generic name "flower" was used to designate the class of these ships, which – in the Royal Navy – were named after flowering plants.

Corvettes commissioned by the Royal Canadian Navy during the Second World War were named after communities for the most part, to better represent the people who took part in building them. This idea was put forth by Admiral Percy W. Nelles. Sponsors were commonly associated with the community for which the ship was named. Royal Navy corvettes were designed as open sea escorts, while Canadian corvettes were developed for coastal auxiliary roles which was exemplified by their minesweeping gear. Eventually the Canadian corvettes would be modified to allow them to perform better on the open seas.

== Construction ==
Midland was ordered as part of the 1940–1941 Flower-class building program. She was identical to the 1939–1940 program except for a few changes. The 1940–41 program had water-tube boilers, which were less responsive but had more reliability in providing a consistent supply of steam. The second significant change was that no minesweeping gear was ever installed, as the role of the corvette had changed from coastal auxiliary to convoy escort.

Midland was laid down 24 February 1941 by Midland Shipyards Ltd. at Midland, Ontario. She was launched 25 June 1941 and commissioned at Montreal, Quebec 17 November 1941. During her career, Midland had two significant refits. The first refit took place at Liverpool, Nova Scotia from 30 November 1942 until 14 April 1943. The second major overhaul of her career began at Galveston, Texas from mid-March until 23 May 1944, during which her fo'c'sle was extended. However, the refit was only completed at Halifax in June 1944.

== Service history ==
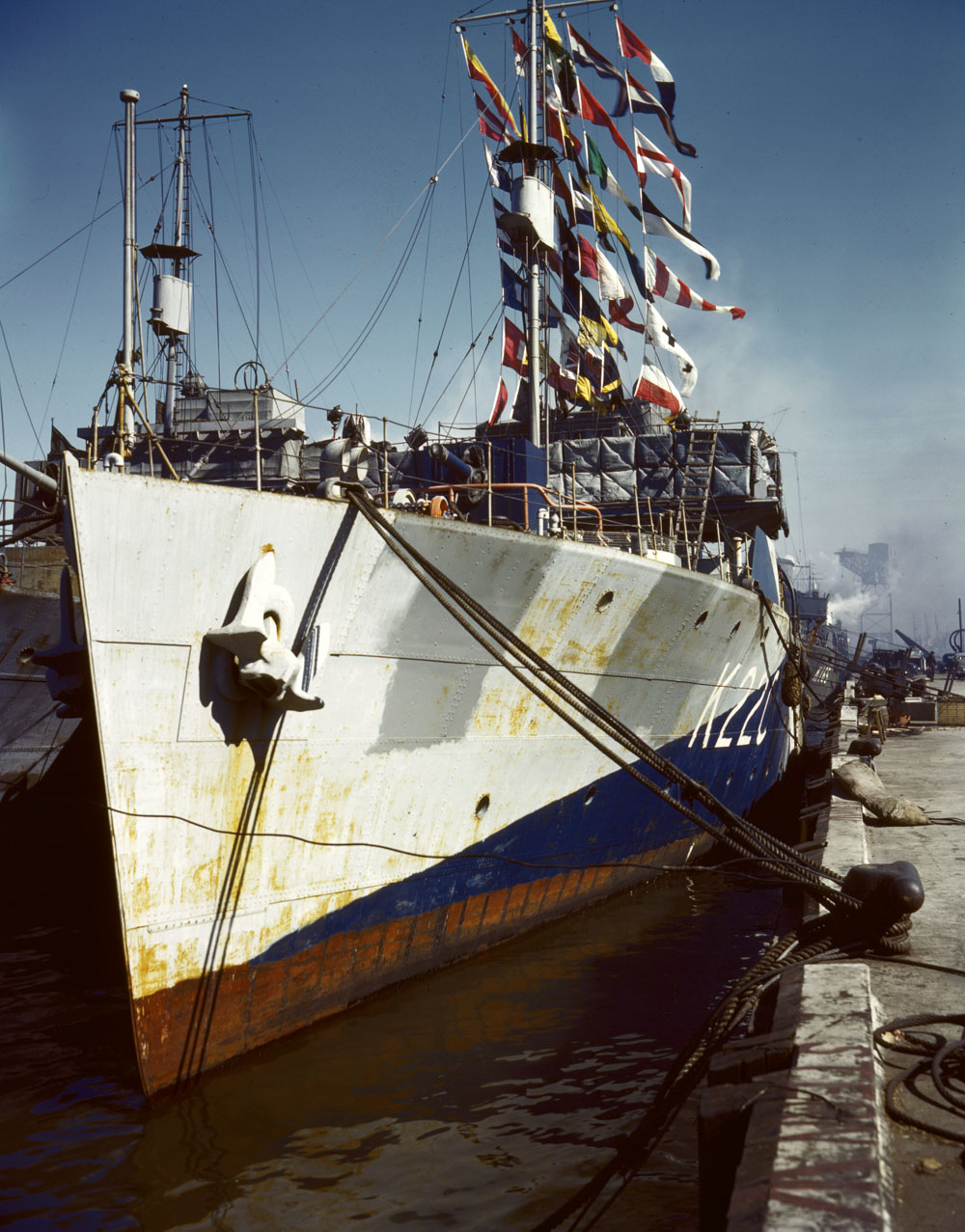
HMCS Midland at anchor

After arriving at Halifax 30 November 1941 for deployment Midland was assigned to the Western Local Escort Force (WLEF). This force was responsible for escorting convoys on what became known as the "Triangle Run" between New York City, Boston and St. John's. In June 1943, when the escort groups were established within the force, she was assigned to group W-2. She remained with that group for the entirety of the remainder of her war service. During her time with W-2 she fought in the Battle of the St. Lawrence. She was credited with one probable U-boat kill off the coast Newfoundland.

Midland was paid off at Sydney, Nova Scotia 15 July 1945 and handed over to the War Assets Corporation for disposal. She was sold for scrapping 19 November 1945 and broken up at Fort William, Ontario.
