= HMCS Kitchener =

Several units of the Royal Canadian Navy have been named HMCS Kitchener.

- HMCS Kitchener (K240), a Flower-class corvette renamed Vancouver before launching. The ship served in the Battle of the Atlantic during the Second World War.
- HMCS Kitchener (K225), a Flower-class corvette that was ordered as Vancouver (K225) and renamed before launching that served in the Battle of the Atlantic during the Second World War.

== Battle honours ==
- Atlantic, 1942–43
- Gulf of St. Lawrence, 1942
- Normandy, 1944
- English Channel, 1944–45
