= HMCS Port Hope =

Retired Bangor-class minesweeper of the Royal Canadian Navy

History

Canada
- Name: Port Hope
- Namesake: Port Hope, Ontario
- Builder: Davie Shipbuilding, Lauzon
- Laid down: 9 September 1941
- Launched: 14 December 1941
- Commissioned: 30 July 1942
- Decommissioned: 13 October 1945
- Identification: Pennant number: J280
- Honours and awards: Atlantic 1943-45, Gulf of St. Lawrence 1942
- Fate: Sold for scrap 1959

General characteristics
- Class & type: Bangor-class minesweeper
- Displacement: 672 long tons (683 t)
- Length: 180 ft (54.9 m) oa
- Beam: 28 ft 6 in (8.7 m)
- Draught: 9 ft 9 in (3.0 m)
- Propulsion: 2 Admiralty 3-drum water tube boilers, 2 shafts, vertical triple-expansion reciprocating engines, 2,400 ihp (1,790 kW)
- Speed: 16.5 knots (31 km/h)
- Complement: 83
- Armament: 1 × QF 3 in (76 mm) 20 cwt gun; 1 x QF 2 pdr Mark VIII; 2 × QF 20 mm Oerlikon guns; 40 depth charges as escort

HMCS Port Hope (pennant J280) was a Bangor-class minesweeper that served with the Royal Canadian Navy during the Second World War. The minesweeper entered service in 1942 and for the majority of the war, served as a patrol and escort ship along the coasts of the Maritimes and Newfoundland, participating in the Battle of the St. Lawrence. Following the war the vessel was laid up until reacquired by the Royal Canadian Navy during the Korean War. Port Hope never re-entered service and was sold for scrap and broken up in 1959.

== Design and description ==
A British design, the Bangor-class minesweepers were smaller than the preceding Halcyon-class minesweepers in British service, but larger than the Fundy class in Canadian service. They came in two versions powered by different engines; those with a diesel engines and those with vertical triple-expansion steam engines. Port Hope was of the latter design and was larger than her diesel-engined cousins. Port Hope was 180 feet (54.9 m) long overall, had a beam of 28 feet 6 inches (8.7 m) and a draught of 9 feet 9 inches (3.0 m). The minesweeper had a displacement of 672 long tons (683 t). She had a complement of 6 officers and 77 enlisted.

Port Hope had two vertical triple-expansion steam engines, each driving one shaft, using steam provided by two Admiralty three-drum boilers. The engines produced a total of 2,400 indicated horsepower (1,800 kW) and gave a maximum speed of 16.5 knots (30.6 km/h; 19.0 mph). The minesweeper could carry a maximum of 150 long tons (152 t) of fuel oil.

Port Hope was armed with a single quick-firing (QF) 3-inch (76 mm) 20 cwt gun mounted forward. (Note: "Cwt" is the abbreviation for hundredweight, 20 cwt referring to the weight of the gun.) The ship was also fitted with a QF 2-pounder Mark VIII aft and were eventually fitted with single-mounted QF 20 mm Oerlikon guns on the bridge wings. Those ships assigned to convoy duty had two depth charge launchers and four chutes to deploy the 40 depth charges they carried. Port Hope was equipped with LL and SA minesweeping gear to clear both magnetic and acoustic naval mines.

== Operational history ==
The minesweeper was ordered as part of the 1941–1942 construction programme. The ship's keel was laid down on 9 September 1941 by Dufferin Shipbuilding, Ltd. at their yard in Toronto, Ontario. Named for a community in Ontario, Port Hope was launched on 14 December 1941. The ship was completed on 27 July 1942 and commissioned on 30 July 1942 at Toronto.

After work ups, the minesweeper joined Halifax Force, the local patrol and escort unit based in Halifax, Nova Scotia. In May 1943, Port Hope transferred to the Gaspé Force and took part in the Battle of the Saint Lawrence, remaining with the unit until November. That month, the ship returned to Halifax Force. In January 1944, the minesweeper was assigned to Newfoundland Force, the patrol and escort force operating out of St. John's, Newfoundland. In October 1944, Port Hope sailed to Saint John, New Brunswick to begin a refit that would be finished at Halifax. The vessel returned to service in April 1945, rejoining Halifax Force and remained with the unit until October.

On 13 October 1945, Port Hope was paid off at Sydney, Nova Scotia and laid up in strategic reserve at Sorel, Quebec. The ship was reacquired in 1952 by the Royal Canadian Navy during the height of the Korean War and given the new hull number FSE 183 and re-designated a coastal escort. However, the ship never re-entered service with the Royal Canadian Navy and remained laid up until 1959. Port Hope was sold to Marine Industries in February 1959 and broken up for scrap at Sorel.
