= J69 =

J69 may refer to:

- HMCS Ingonish (J69), a Bangor-class minesweeper of the Royal Canadian Navy
- HMS Sphinx (J69), a Halcyon-class minesweeper of the Royal Navy
- LNER Class J69, a British steam locomotive class
- Parabiaugmented truncated dodecahedron
- Teledyne CAE J69, a turbojet engine
