= HMCS Lunenburg =

Flower-class corvette

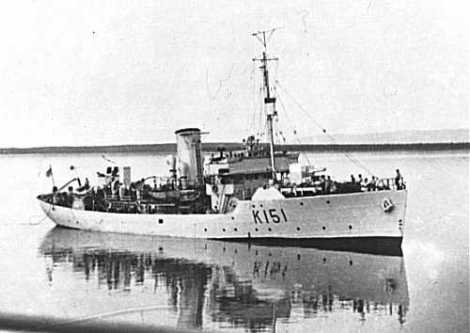
- HMCS Lunenburg

History

Canada
- Name: Lunenburg
- Namesake: Lunenburg, Nova Scotia
- Ordered: 24 January 1940
- Builder: Davie Shipbuilding, Lauzon
- Laid down: 28 September 1940
- Launched: 10 July 1941
- Commissioned: 4 December 1941
- Decommissioned: 23 July 1945
- Identification: Pennant number: K151
- Honours and awards: Atlantic 1942–45; North Africa 1942–43; English Channel 1944; Normandy 1944; Gulf of St. Lawrence 1942
- Fate: Scrapped June 1946.

General characteristics
- Class & type: Flower-class corvette
- Displacement: 925 long tons (940 t; 1,036 short tons)
- Length: 205 ft (62.48 m)o/a
- Beam: 33 ft (10.06 m)
- Draught: 11.5 ft (3.51 m)
- Installed power: 2 × fire tube Scotch boilers; 1 × 4-cycle triple-expansion reciprocating steam engine; 2,750 ihp (2,050 kW)
- Propulsion: Single shaft
- Speed: 16 knots (30 km/h; 18 mph)
- Range: 3,500 nmi (6,482 km) at 12 knots (22 km/h; 14 mph)
- Complement: 85
- Sensors & processing systems: 1 × SW1C or 2C radar; 1 × Type 123A or Type 127DV sonar
- Armament: 1 × BL 4 in (102 mm) Mk.IX single gun; 2 × .50 cal machine gun (twin); 2 × Lewis .303 cal machine gun (twin); 2 × Mk.II depth charge throwers; 2 × depth charge rails with 40 depth charges

HMCS Lunenburg was a Flower-class corvette that served with the Royal Canadian Navy during the Second World War. She fought primarily in the Battle of the Atlantic as an ocean escort. She was named for Lunenburg, Nova Scotia.

== Background ==
Flower-class corvettes like Lunenburg serving with the Royal Canadian Navy during the Second World War were different from earlier and more traditional sail-driven corvettes. The "corvette" designation was created by the French as a class of small warships; the Royal Navy borrowed the term for a period but discontinued its use in 1877. During the hurried preparations for war in the late 1930s, Winston Churchill reactivated the corvette class, needing a name for smaller ships used in an escort capacity, in this case based on a whaling ship design. The generic name "flower" was used to designate the class of these ships, which – in the Royal Navy – were named after flowering plants.

Corvettes commissioned by the Royal Canadian Navy during the Second World War were named after communities for the most part, to better represent the people who took part in building them. This idea was put forth by Admiral Percy W. Nelles. Sponsors were commonly associated with the community for which the ship was named. Royal Navy corvettes were designed as open sea escorts, while Canadian corvettes were developed for coastal auxiliary roles which was exemplified by their minesweeping gear. Eventually the Canadian corvettes would be modified to allow them to perform better on the open seas.

== Construction ==
Lunenburg was ordered on 24 January 1940 as part of the 1939–1940 Flower-class building program. She was laid down George T. Davie & Sons Ltd. at Lauzon, Quebec on 28 September 1940 and launched 10 July 1941. Lunenburg was commissioned at Quebec City on 4 December 1941.

During her career Lunenburg went through three significant refits. The first took place after she was assigned to duties associated with Operation Torch in 1942. Upon arrival in the United Kingdom, she was given added AA armaments to protect her against the increased chance of aerial bombardment. Her second major refit began in March 1943 at Liverpool, Nova Scotia and was completed on 17 August 1943. During this refit her fo'c'sle was extended. Her third and final significant refit began in the fall of 1944 at Saint John and was completed at Halifax mid-January 1945.

== Service history ==
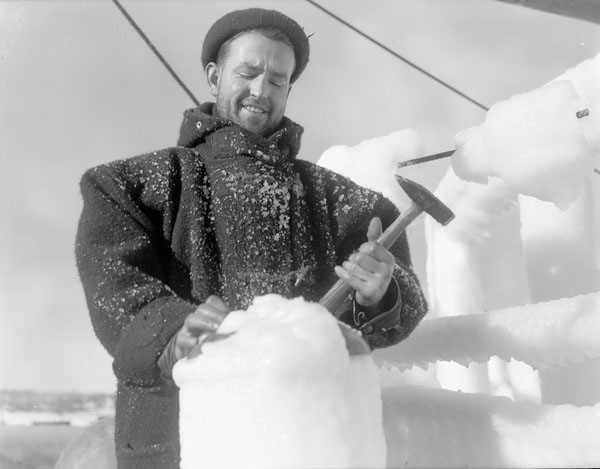
Chipping ice on Lunenburg, January 1942

After initial workups, Lunenburg was deployed as a local escort. In July 1942 she transferred to Halifax Force and escorted convoys between Quebec and Labrador. In August 1942, Lunenburg was reassigned to the Gulf Escort Force before being sent to the United Kingdom in September as part of Canada's contribution to Operation Torch.

Beginning in November 1942, Lunenburg began escorting convoys between the United Kingdom and sites around and within the Mediterranean Sea. She was occupied with this for the next four months, until she was dispatched to Canada for a major refit. Upon resumption of her service in November 1943, she was assigned to Western Approaches Command under Royal Navy control as part of escort group EG 6. For the following five months, she escorted convoys to and from the United Kingdom.

When the group replaced its corvettes with frigates, Lunenburg was sent to Portsmouth after being assigned to Operation Neptune, the naval aspect of the invasion of Normandy. She was employed mainly in the English Channel for the next five months before returning to Canada in the fall of 1944 for a major refit. After workups in Bermuda Lunenburg returned to her duties in the English Channel, this time attached to Plymouth Command. She served with them until the end of the war, returning to Canada in June 1945 for the last time.

Lunenburg was paid off at Sorel, Quebec on 23 July 1945. The ship was sold for scrapping in June 1946 and was broken up at Hamilton, Ontario.
