= HMCS Lévis (K400) =

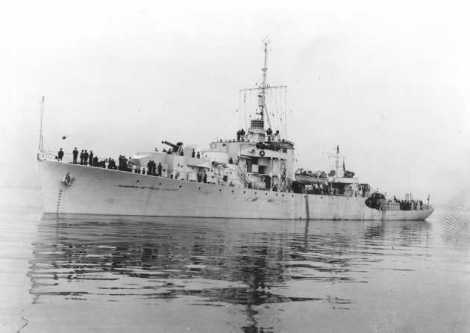
- HMCS Lévis

History

Canada
- Name: Lévis
- Namesake: Lévis, Quebec
- Ordered: June 1942
- Builder: Davie Shipbuilding, Lauzon
- Laid down: 25 February 1943
- Launched: 26 November 1943
- Commissioned: 21 July 1944
- Decommissioned: 21 February 1946
- Identification: Pennant number:K 400
- Honours and awards: Gulf of St. Lawrence 1944, Atlantic 1941,1944-45
- Fate: Sold 1947, hull stripped and sunk as breakwater in 1948.

General characteristics
- Class & type: River-class frigate
- Displacement: 1,445 long tons (1,468 t; 1,618 short tons); 2,110 long tons (2,140 t; 2,360 short tons) (deep load)
- Length: 283 ft (86.26 m) p/p; 301.25 ft (91.82 m)o/a
- Beam: 36.5 ft (11.13 m)
- Draught: 9 ft (2.74 m); 13 ft (3.96 m) (deep load)
- Propulsion: 2 × Admiralty 3-drum boilers, 2 shafts, reciprocating vertical triple expansion, 5,500 ihp (4,100 kW)
- Speed: 20 knots (37.0 km/h); 20.5 knots (38.0 km/h) (turbine ships)
- Range: 646 long tons (656 t; 724 short tons) oil fuel; 7,500 nautical miles (13,890 km) at 15 knots (27.8 km/h)
- Complement: 157
- Armament: 2 × QF 4 in (102 mm) /45 Mk. XVI on twin mount HA/LA Mk.XIX; 1 × QF 12 pdr (3 in (76 mm)) 12 cwt /40 Mk. V on mounting HA/LA Mk.IX (not all ships); 8 × 20 mm guns QF Oerlikon A/A on twin mounts Mk.V; 1 × Hedgehog 24 spigot A/S projector; up to 150 depth charges

HMCS Lévis was a River-class frigate that served with the Royal Canadian Navy during the Second World War. She served primarily as a convoy escort in the Battle of the St. Lawrence and the Battle of the Atlantic. She was the second ship to bear the name of Lévis, the first being a Flower-class corvette that had been sunk earlier in the war. She was named for Lévis, Quebec.

Lévis was ordered in June 1942 as part of the 1942–1943 River-class building program. She was laid down on 25 February 1943 by Davie Shipbuilding & Repairing Co. Ltd. at Lauzon and launched 26 November 1943. She was commissioned into the Royal Canadian Navy on 21 July 1944 at Quebec City.

== Background ==
The River-class frigate was designed by William Reed of Smith's Dock Company of South Bank-on-Tees. Originally called a "twin-screw corvette", its purpose was to improve on the convoy escort classes in service with the Royal Navy at the time, including the Flower-class corvette. The first orders were placed by the Royal Navy in 1940 and the vessels were named for rivers in the United Kingdom, giving name to the class. In Canada they were named for towns and cities though they kept the same designation. The name "frigate" was suggested by Vice-Admiral Percy Nelles of the Royal Canadian Navy and was adopted later that year.

Improvements over the corvette design included improved accommodation which was markedly better. The twin engines gave only three more knots of speed but extended the range of the ship to nearly double that of a corvette at 7,200 nautical miles (13,300 km) at 12 knots. Among other lessons applied to the design was an armament package better designed to combat U-boats including a twin 4-inch mount forward and 12-pounder aft. 15 Canadian frigates were initially fitted with a single 4-inch gun forward but with the exception of HMCS Valleyfield, they were all eventually upgraded to the double mount. For underwater targets, the River-class frigate was equipped with a Hedgehog anti-submarine mortar and depth charge rails aft and four side-mounted throwers.

River-class frigates were the first Royal Canadian Navy warships to carry the 147B Sword horizontal fan echo sonar transmitter in addition to the irregular ASDIC. This allowed the ship to maintain contact with targets even while firing unless a target was struck. Improved radar and direction-finding equipment improved the RCN's ability to find and track enemy submarines over the previous classes.

Canada originally ordered the construction of 33 frigates in October 1941. The design was too big for the shipyards on the Great Lakes so all the frigates built in Canada were built in dockyards along the west coast or along the St. Lawrence River. In all Canada ordered the construction of 60 frigates including ten for the Royal Navy that transferred two to the United States Navy.

== War service ==
After working up in Bermuda, Lévis joined escort group EG 27 at Halifax, Nova Scotia in September. She remained with this unit until June 1945 performing anti-submarine patrols and convoy escort duty. It was during this period that she fought in the Battle of the St. Lawrence. On 4 June 1945 Lévis began a tropicalization refit at Lunenburg in preparation for service in the southern Pacific Ocean. The refit was completed on 26 November and she sailed for the west coast. Lévis arrived at Esquimalt, British Columbia on 30 January 1946 and was paid off there on 21 February. She was sold to Capital Iron & Metals Ltd. of Victoria, British Columbia in 1947. Her hull was stripped and she was sunk as a breakwater in Oyster Bay, British Columbia in 1948.
