= HMCS Lethbridge =

Flower-class corvette

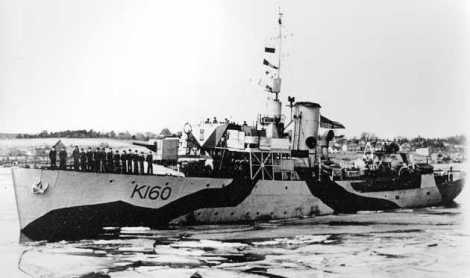
- HMCS Lethbridge

History

Canada
- Name: Lethbridge
- Namesake: Lethbridge, Alberta
- Ordered: 20 January 1940
- Builder: Canadian Vickers Ltd., Montreal
- Laid down: 5 August 1940
- Launched: 21 November 1940
- Commissioned: 25 June 1941
- Decommissioned: 23 July 1945
- Identification: Pennant number: K160
- Honours and awards: Atlantic 1941–45; Gulf of St. Lawrence 1942 1944
- Fate: Sold for mercantile use, scrapped 1966

General characteristics
- Class & type: Flower-class corvette (original)
- Displacement: 925 long tons (940 t; 1,036 short tons)
- Length: 205 ft (62.48 m)o/a
- Beam: 33 ft (10.06 m)
- Draught: 11.5 ft (3.51 m)
- Propulsion: single shaft; 2 × fire tube Scotch boilers; 1 × 4-cycle triple-expansion reciprocating steam engine; 2,750 ihp (2,050 kW)
- Speed: 16 knots (29.6 km/h)
- Range: 3,500 nautical miles (6,482 km) at 12 knots (22.2 km/h)
- Complement: 85
- Sensors & processing systems: 1 × SW1C or 2C radar; 1 × Type 123A or Type 127DV sonar
- Armament: 1 × BL 4 in (102 mm) Mk.IX single gun; 2 × .50 cal machine gun (twin); 2 × Lewis .303 cal machine gun (twin); 2 × Mk.II depth charge throwers; 2 × depth charge rails with 40 depth charges; originally fitted with minesweeping gear, later removed

HMCS Lethbridge was a Flower-class corvette that served with the Royal Canadian Navy during the Second World War. She served primarily in the Battle of the Atlantic as an ocean escort. She was named for Lethbridge, Alberta.

== Background ==
Flower-class corvettes like Lethbridge serving with the Royal Canadian Navy during the Second World War were different from earlier and more traditional sail-driven corvettes. The "corvette" designation was created by the French as a class of small warships; the Royal Navy borrowed the term for a period but discontinued its use in 1877. During the hurried preparations for war in the late 1930s, Winston Churchill reactivated the corvette class, needing a name for smaller ships used in an escort capacity, in this case based on a whaling ship design. The generic name "flower" was used to designate the class of these ships, which – in the Royal Navy – were named after flowering plants.

Corvettes commissioned by the Royal Canadian Navy during the Second World War were named after communities for the most part, to better represent the people who took part in building them. This idea was put forth by Admiral Percy W. Nelles. Sponsors were commonly associated with the community for which the ship was named. Royal Navy corvettes were designed as open sea escorts, while Canadian corvettes were developed for coastal auxiliary roles which was exemplified by their minesweeping gear. Eventually the Canadian corvettes would be modified to allow them to perform better on the open seas.

== Construction ==
Lethbridge was ordered on 20 January 1940 as part of the 1939–1940 Flower-class building program. She was laid down by Canadian Vickers Ltd. at Montreal, Quebec on 5 August 1940 and launched on 21 November later that year. Lethbridge was commissioned 25 June 1941 at Montreal.

Lethbridge had two major refits during her career. The first took place at Liverpool, Nova Scotia from 10 September until 10 October 1942. Her second refit took place at Sydney, Nova Scotia from January to March 1944. During this refit her fo'c'sle was extended.

== War service ==
After arriving at Halifax on 4 July 1941, Lethbridge was briefly assigned to Sydney Force. In October 1941 she was transferred to the Newfoundland Escort Force and served with escort groups 24N, N16 and N17 during her time with them. Initially she escorted convoys from St. John's to Iceland however beginning in February 1942, the destination changed from Iceland to Derry.

In June 1942 Lethbridge joined the Gulf Escort Force, escorting convoys from Quebec and Sydney. After her first refit at the end of the year, she was sent to New York to be placed under American command while escorting convoys from New York and Guantanamo. After that assignment was completed she was reassigned to the Western Local Escort Force (WLEF) in March 1943. Lethbridge remained with WLEF until the end of the war. Beginning June 1943, she was assigned to escort group W-3 and in April 1944, W-5. She remained with that group for the remainder of her service.

== Post-war service ==
Lethbridge was paid off at Sorel, Quebec on 23 July 1945, after the war had ended. She was sold to Marine Industries that year. In 1952, Marine Industries resold her for conversion into a whale-catcher. In 1955 she reappeared as the Dutch-flagged Nicolas Vinke. She was later broken up in Santander, Spain in September 1966 by Recuperaciones Submarinas S.A.
