= HMCS Red Deer =

History

Canada
- Name: Red Deer
- Namesake: City of Red Deer
- Builder: Canadian Vickers Ltd., Montreal
- Laid down: 1 January 1941
- Launched: 5 October 1941
- Commissioned: 24 November 1941
- Decommissioned: 30 October 1945
- Identification: Pennant number: J255; 196 (1952)
- Honours and awards: Atlantic 1942–45, Gulf of St. Lawrence 1942, 1944
- Fate: Sold for scrap 1959

General characteristics
- Class & type: Bangor-class minesweeper
- Displacement: 672 long tons (683 t)
- Length: 180 ft (54.9 m) oa
- Beam: 28 ft 6 in (8.7 m)
- Draught: 9 ft 9 in (3.0 m)
- Propulsion: 2 Admiralty 3-drum water tube boilers, 2 shafts, vertical triple-expansion reciprocating engines, 2,400 ihp (1,790 kW)
- Speed: 16.5 knots (31 km/h)
- Complement: 83
- Armament: 1 × 12-pounder (3 in (76 mm)) 12 cwt HA gun or QF 3-inch (76 mm) 20 cwt gun; 1 x QF 2 pdr Mark VIII; 2 × QF 20 mm Oerlikon guns; 40 depth charges as escort

HMCS Red Deer was a Bangor-class minesweeper that served in the Royal Canadian Navy during the Second World War. The minesweeper saw action in the Battle of the Atlantic and the Battle of the St. Lawrence. She was named for Red Deer, Alberta. After the war the vessel was briefly reacquired by the Royal Canadian Navy, but was not recommissioned and was sold for scrap and broken up in 1959.

== Design and description ==
A British design, the Bangor-class minesweepers were smaller than the preceding Halcyon-class minesweepers in British service, but larger than the Fundy class in Canadian service. They came in two versions powered by different engines; those with a diesel engines and those with vertical triple-expansion steam engines. Red Deer was of the latter design and was larger than her diesel-engined cousins. Red Deer was 180 feet (54.9 m) long overall, had a beam of 28 feet 6 inches (8.7 m) and a draught of 9 feet 9 inches (3.0 m). The minesweeper had a displacement of 672 long tons (683 t). She had a complement of 6 officers and 77 enlisted.

Red Deer had two vertical triple-expansion steam engines, each driving one shaft, using steam provided by two Admiralty three-drum boilers. The engines produced a total of 2,400 indicated horsepower (1,800 kW) and gave a maximum speed of 16.5 knots (30.6 km/h; 19.0 mph). The minesweeper could carry a maximum of 150 long tons (152 t) of fuel oil.

In general, Bangor-class minesweepers were armed with either a single quick-firing (QF) 12-pounder (3 in (76 mm)) 12 cwt HA gun or a QF 3-inch (76 mm) 20 cwt gun mounted forward. (Note: "Cwt" is the abbreviation for hundredweight, 20 cwt referring to the weight of the gun.) The ships were also fitted with a QF 2-pounder Mark VIII aft and were eventually fitted with single-mounted QF 20 mm Oerlikon guns on the bridge wings. Those ships assigned to convoy duty were armed with two depth charge launchers and four chutes to deploy their 40 depth charges. Red Deer was equipped with LL and SA minesweeping gear to counter magnetic and acoustic naval mines.

== Service history ==
Red Deer was ordered as part of 1940–1941 construction programme. The minesweeper's keel was laid down on 10 January 1941 by Canadian Vickers Ltd. at Montreal, Quebec. The ship was launched on 5 October later that year. Red Deer was commissioned into the Royal Canadian Navy on 24 November 1941 at Montreal with the pennant number J255.

After commissioning, Red Deer was assigned to the Western Local Escort Force as a convoy escort. At various periods after that she served with Sydney Force, Halifax Local Defence Force and the Gulf Escort Force, as part of the Battle of the St. Lawrence. On 12 January 1942 she rescued 95 survivors from the British merchant ship SS Cyclops, which had been torpedoed by U-123. Beginning in February 1944, Red Deer was assigned to Newfoundland Force. In May 1944 she began a refit at Liverpool, completing it in July 1944 and working up in Bermuda later that month. She returned to Newfoundland Force after working up and remained with the unit until the end of the war. She was paid off at Halifax, Nova Scotia on 30 October 1945 and laid up at Shelburne.

After the war Red Deer was placed in strategic reserve at Sorel, Quebec. In 1952, she was reacquired by the Royal Canadian Navy and refitted in preparation for active duty and given the new pennant number 196. She was never recommissioned and was sold to Marine Industries of Sorel in February 1959 to be broken up.

== Affiliations ==
126 RCSCC Red Deer is a Royal Canadian Sea Cadet Corp in Red Deer, Alberta, that is named after HMCS Red Deer.

== See also ==
- List of ships of the Canadian Navy
