= HMCS Grandmère =

History

Canada
- Name: Grandmère
- Builder: Canadian Vickers, Montreal
- Laid down: 2 June 1941
- Launched: 21 August 1941
- Commissioned: 11 December 1941
- Decommissioned: 23 October 1945
- Identification: Pennant number: J262
- Honours and awards: Gulf of St. Lawrence 1942, Atlantic 1943, 1945
- Fate: Sold commercial service 1947

General characteristics
- Class & type: Bangor-class minesweeper
- Displacement: 672 long tons (683 t)
- Length: 180 ft (54.9 m) oa
- Beam: 28 ft 6 in (8.7 m)
- Draught: 9 ft 9 in (3.0 m)
- Propulsion: 2 Admiralty 3-drum water tube boilers, 2 shafts, vertical triple-expansion reciprocating engines, 2,400 ihp (1,790 kW)
- Speed: 16.5 knots (31 km/h)
- Complement: 83
- Armament: 1 x QF 3-inch (76 mm) 20 cwt gun; 1 x QF 2 pdr Mark VIII; 2 × QF 20 mm Oerlikon guns; 40 depth charges as escort

HMCS Grandmère (pennant J258) was a Bangor-class minesweeper constructed for the Royal Canadian Navy during the Second World War. Entering service in 1941, the minesweeper took part in the Battle of the Atlantic and the Battle of the St. Lawrence before being taken out of service in 1945. The ship was sold for mercantile service following the war, first as the yacht Elda and then the cargo ship Jacks Bay. The ship was sold for scrap in 1968.

== Design and description ==
A British design, the Bangor-class minesweepers were smaller than the preceding Halcyon-class minesweepers in British service, but larger than the Fundy class in Canadian service. They came in two versions powered by different engines; those with a diesel engines and those with vertical triple-expansion steam engines. Grandmère was of the latter design and was larger than her diesel-engined cousins. Grandmère was 180 feet (54.9 m) long overall, had a beam of 28 feet 6 inches (8.7 m) and a draught of 9 feet 9 inches (3.0 m). The minesweeper had a displacement of 672 long tons (683 t). She had a complement of 6 officers and 77 enlisted.

Grandmère had two vertical triple-expansion steam engines, each driving one shaft, using steam provided by two Admiralty three-drum boilers. The engines produced a total of 2,400 indicated horsepower (1,800 kW) and gave a maximum speed of 16.5 knots (30.6 km/h; 19.0 mph). The minesweeper could carry a maximum of 150 long tons (152 t) of fuel oil.

The minesweeper was armed with a single quick-firing (QF) 3-inch (76 mm) 20 cwt gun mounted forward. (Note: "Cwt" is the abbreviation for hundredweight, 20 cwt referring to the weight of the gun.) The ship was also fitted with a QF 2-pounder Mark VIII aft and were eventually fitted with single-mounted QF 20 mm Oerlikon guns on the bridge wings. Those ships assigned to convoy duty were armed with two depth charge launchers and four chutes to deploy their 40 depth charges. Grandmère was equipped with SA and LL minesweeping gear for the detection of acoustic and magnetic naval mines.

== Operational history ==
=== War service ===
The minesweeper was ordered as part of the 1940–41 building programme. The ship's keel was laid down on 2 June 1941 by Canadian Vickers at their shipyard in Montreal, Quebec. Named for a town in Quebec, Grandmère was launched on 21 August 1941. The minesweeper was commissioned into the Royal Canadian Navy on 11 December 1941.

While making her way to Halifax, Nova Scotia, Grandmère broke down in the Gulf of St. Lawrence on 21 December and was towed to Sydney, Nova Scotia by the corvette HMCS Kamsack. While undergoing repairs at Sydney following the breakdown, the ship suffered damage to the No. 2 boiler. To repair that damage required being towed to Pictou, Nova Scotia. The repairs were not completed until May 1942.

Grandmère arrived at Halifax on 5 May 1942. The minesweeper was assigned to the Western Local Escort Force as a convoy escort followed by an assignment with Sydney Force, the local patrol and escort unit operating out of Sydney, Nova Scotia. On 14 October 1942 while with Sydney Force, Grandmère was escorting the Newfoundland Railway ferry SS Caribou on its weekly passage in the Cabot Strait from North Sydney to Port-aux-Basques, Newfoundland. The two vessels were spotted by the German U-boat U-69 with the minesweeper 2,500 yards (2,300 m) off the starboard quarter of the ferry. The submarine fired one torpedo at the ferry which caused the boilers aboard Caribou to explode. The vessel sank in minutes.

The minesweeper closed with the sinking ship and spotted the U-boat 350 yards (320 m) away. Grandmère attempted to ram U-69, but the submarine dived beneath the site of the sinking, expecting the minesweeper to not drop depth charges among the survivors. The minesweeper continued hunting the German submarine for two hours before returning to the site of the sinking and picking up survivors. 101 passengers and crew of the ferry were recovered.

The minesweeper then transferred to Halifax Force as a convoy escort and the Halifax Local Defence Force as a patrol vessel. In July 1943, Grandmère underwent a refit at Louisburg, Nova Scotia that took seven weeks to complete. In September 1944, a second refit was performed in Sydney and completed in Halifax. The ship was paid off on 23 October 1945 at Sydney and placed in reserve at Shelburne, Nova Scotia.

=== Postwar service ===
The vessel was sold to private interests in 1947 and converted to a yacht. Renamed Elda and operated by Saguenay Terminals Ltd, the vessel was registered in Montreal. In 1951 Elda was sold to Three Bays Corp Ltd and converted to a 664 GRT cargo ship and renamed Jacks Bay. The ship was registered in Nassau, Bahamas. Ownership was transferred to Victorene Nav Co Ltd in 1959 and again in 1960 to Caribbean-Hamburg Ltd. In 1961 the cargo ship was sold to Proton Corp and renamed Proton. The registry was changed from Nassau to Panama. In 1968 the Jacks Bay was sold to Pinto Island Metal Co and broken up in Mobile, Alabama.
