= HMCS Matapedia =

Flower-class corvette

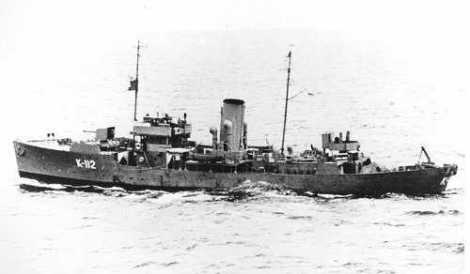
- HMCS Matapedia

History

Canada
- Name: Matapedia
- Namesake: Matapédia, Quebec
- Ordered: 23 January 1940
- Builder: Morton Engineering and Dry Dock Co., Quebec City
- Laid down: 2 February 1940
- Launched: 14 September 1940
- Commissioned: 9 May 1941
- Decommissioned: 16 June 1945
- Identification: Pennant number: K112
- Honours and awards: Atlantic 1941–45; Gulf of St. Lawrence 1944
- Fate: Scrapped 1950.

General characteristics
- Class & type: Flower-class corvette
- Displacement: 925 long tons (940 t; 1,036 short tons)
- Length: 205 ft (62.48 m)o/a
- Beam: 33 ft (10.06 m)
- Draught: 11.5 ft (3.51 m)
- Installed power: 2 × fire tube Scotch boilers; 1 × 4-cycle triple-expansion reciprocating steam engine; 2,750 ihp (2,050 kW)
- Propulsion: Single shaft
- Speed: 16 knots (30 km/h; 18 mph)
- Range: 3,500 nmi (6,482 km) at 12 knots (22 km/h; 14 mph)
- Complement: 85
- Sensors & processing systems: 1 × SW1C or 2C radar; 1 × Type 123A or Type 127DV sonar
- Armament: 1 × BL 4 in (102 mm) Mk.IX single gun; 2 × .50 cal machine gun (twin); 2 × Lewis .303 cal machine gun (twin); 2 × Mk.II depth charge throwers; 2 × depth charge rails with 40 depth charges

HMCS Matapedia was a Flower-class corvette that served with the Royal Canadian Navy during the Second World War. She fought primarily in the Battle of the Atlantic as an ocean escort. She was named for Matapédia, Quebec.

== Background ==
Flower-class corvettes like Matapedia serving with the Royal Canadian Navy during the Second World War were different from earlier and more traditional sail-driven corvettes. The "corvette" designation was created by the French as a class of small warships; the Royal Navy borrowed the term for a period but discontinued its use in 1877. During the hurried preparations for war in the late 1930s, Winston Churchill reactivated the corvette class, needing a name for smaller ships used in an escort capacity, in this case based on a whaling ship design. The generic name "flower" was used to designate the class of these ships, which – in the Royal Navy – were named after flowering plants.

Corvettes commissioned by the Royal Canadian Navy during the Second World War were named after communities for the most part, to better represent the people who took part in building them. This idea was put forth by Admiral Percy W. Nelles. Sponsors were commonly associated with the community for which the ship was named. Royal Navy corvettes were designed as open sea escorts, while Canadian corvettes were developed for coastal auxiliary roles which was exemplified by their minesweeping gear. Eventually the Canadian corvettes would be modified to allow them to perform better on the open seas.

== Construction ==
Matapedia was ordered on 23 January 1940 as part of the 1939–1940 Flower-class building program. She was laid down by Morton Engineering and Dry Dock Co. at Quebec City on 2 February 1940 and launched 14 September 1940. Matapedia was commissioned at Quebec City on 9 May 1941.

During the war, Matapedia had three significant refits. Her first major refit took place at Pictou from May until July 1942. The second began at Dartmouth in September 1943 as general repairs after being rammed. However, in October, she was towed to Liverpool, Nova Scotia for a more extensive refit which was completed in February 1944. During that time she had her fo'c'sle extended. Matapedia's final major refit took place from 15 February 1945 until 28 April at Halifax, Nova Scotia.

== Service history ==
After initial workups, Matapedia was assigned to Sydney Force as a local escort. This lasted until September 1941 when she transferred to the Newfoundland Escort Force. She worked as an ocean escort with convoys traveling from St. John's to Iceland until March 1942.

In March 1942, Matapedia was reassigned to the Western Local Escort Force (WLEF). She remained with this escort force for the majority of the war. In June 1943, with the establishment of escort groups within WLEF, Matapedia was assigned to group W-5. On 8 September 1943, she was rammed amidships by the freighter SS Scorton in foggy conditions near the Sambro Light Ship at the entrance to Halifax Harbour. The damage was significant and Matapedia would not return to service until 1944.

After workups in Bermuda, she rejoined W-5 for a brief period before transferring to escort group W-4. For the remainder of the war, Matapedia was a part of this group with the exception of November–December 1944. During that brief two-month period, she was assigned to Gaspe Force.

Matapedia was paid off at Sorel, Quebec on 16 June 1945. She was sold in December 1950 for scrapping and was broken up at Hamilton, Ontario.
