= Llewellyn-class minesweeper =

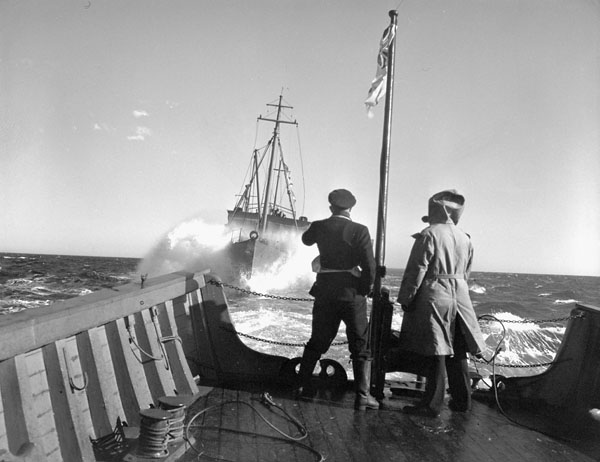
- The view from HMCS Lloyd George of HMCS Llewellyn off Halifax, Nova Scotia in June 1943.

Class overview
- Name: Llewellyn class
- Operators: Royal Canadian Navy
- In commission: 1942–1953
- Planned: 10
- Completed: 10
- Lost: 6

General characteristics
- Type: Minesweeper
- Displacement: 228 long tons (232 t)
- Length: 105 ft 0 in (32 m) pp; 119 ft 4 in (36.4 m) oa
- Beam: 22 ft 0 in (6.7 m)
- Draught: 8 ft 8 in (2.6 m)
- Propulsion: Diesel engine, 500 bhp (373 kW); 1 propeller
- Speed: 12 knots (22 km/h; 14 mph)
- Complement: 20
- Armament: 2 × twin 0.5 in (12.7 mm) machine guns
- Notes: Equipped with "Double L" magnetic minesweeping gear

The Llewellyn-class minesweepers were a series of ten coastal minesweepers constructed for the Royal Canadian Navy during the Second World War. Based on the Admiralty type MMS-class minesweeper, the Llewellyn class were constructed of wood and used for the removal of magnetic influence mines. Two were built in Quebec, with the eight constructed on the Western Coast of Canada. Mostly used as guard ships during the war, only three of the ten remained in Royal Canadian Navy service following the war, with the last being discarded in 1957. Following naval service, vessels of the class ended up in commercial service, with some becoming fishing vessels, cargo ships and one a floating restaurant. Six of the ten ships were lost in commercial service.

== Description ==
Based on the Admiralty type MMS-class minesweepers, the Llewellyn class were built with wooden hulls for deployment against magnetic influence mines that would detect a steel hull passing nearby and detonate. The minesweepers had a standard displacement of 228 long tons (232 t). They were 119 ft 4 in (36.4 m) long overall and 105 ft 0 in (32 m) between perpendiculars with a beam of 22 ft 0 in (6.7 m) and a draught of 8 ft 8 in (2.6 m). The Llewellyn class were powered by a diesel engine driving one propeller shaft, rated at 500 brake horsepower (373 kW). This gave the minesweepers a maximum speed of 12 knots (22 km/h; 14 mph).

The Llewellyn class were armed with four 0.5 in (12.7 mm) machine guns placed in two twin mounts. At some point, their armament was changed to one 0.5-inch machine gun placed amidships and twin .303-inch (7.7 mm) machine guns on the bridge wings. The minesweepers were equipped with the "Double L" magnetic minesweeping gear and had a complement of 23 composed of 3 officers and 20 crew.

== Ships in class ==
Llewellyn class construction data
Name	Pennant	Builder	Launched	Commissioned	Decommissioned	Fate
Llewellyn	J278/141	Chantier Maritime de St. Laurent, Île d'Orléans, Quebec	12 August 1942	24 August 1942	31 October 1951	Sold for commercial use, foundered 28 October 1960
Lloyd George	J279/142	Chantier Maritime de St. Laurent, Île d'Orléans, Quebec	12 August 1942	24 August 1942	16 July 1948	Sold for commercial use 14 May 1951, abandoned 1961
Revelstoke	J373	Star Shipyards, New Westminster, British Columbia	3 November 1943	4 July 1944	23 October 1953	Sold 1957, caught fire and sank on 12 October 1979
Cranbrook	J372	Star Shipyards, New Westminster, British Columbia	5 June 1943	12 May 1944	3 November 1945	Sold November 1947, registry disappeared 1950
Coquitlam	J364	Newcastle Shipbuilding, Nanaimo, British Columbia	5 January 1944	25 July 1944	30 November 1945	Sold October 1946, ran aground 17 June 1954
St. Joseph	J359	Newcastle Shipbuilding, Nanaimo, British Columbia	14 September 1943	24 May 1944	8 November 1945	Sold for commercial use, registry deleted 1988
Rossland	J358	Vancouver Shipyards, Vancouver, British Columbia	14 August 1943	15 July 1944	1 November 1945	Sold for commercial use 1946
Daerwood	J357	Vancouver Shipyards, Vancouver, British Columbia	14 August 1943	22 April 1944	28 November 1945	Sold for commercial use 30 December 1946. Caught fire and sank, 13 October 1973
Lavallee	J371	A.C. Benson Shipyard, Vancouver, British Columbia	27 May 1943	21 June 1944	27 December 1945	Sold 1947, burned and sank on 1 March 1967
Kalamalka	J395	A.C. Benson Shipyard, Vancouver, British Columbia	29 December 1943	2 October 1944	16 November 1945	Sold 1946, burned and sank on 18 March 1968

== Service history ==
The first two vessels of the class were constructed at Île d'Orléans, Quebec. Llewellyn and Lloyd George were both commissioned on 24 August 1942 at Quebec City and escorted a convoy from Quebec City to Sydney, Nova Scotia before arriving at Halifax, Nova Scotia. Both vessels' names begin with a double "l", a reflection of their minesweeping gear. They would be the only two vessels that began their names as such, as the eight minesweepers constructed in British Columbia did not follow this pattern.

During the Second World War, Llewellyn and Lloyd George operated out of Halifax performing sweeps of the approaches to Halifax Harbour. Following the war, Llewellyn became the guard ship for the Royal Canadian Navy reserve fleet at Halifax. Taken out of service on 14 June 1946. Llewellyn was recommissioned on 25 July 1949 as tender at Saint John, New Brunswick associated with the naval reserve division HMCS Scotian, primarily used for training. That summer, the ship made a tour of Newfoundland, after it became the 10th province of Canada. Llewellyn was tender to HMCS Brunswicker in 1951. The ship was decommissioned again on 31 October 1951. Sold 1957 for commercial use. Renamed Llewellyn II, the fishing vessel foundered off Cape Breton Island on 28 October 1960. Following war, Lloyd George was used as a bathythermograph survey vessel until 16 July 1948 when the ship was decommissioned. Lloyd George was sold on 14 May 1951 to become a floating restaurant at Bridgewater, Nova Scotia. The hulk was abandoned ten years later.

The British Columbia-built minesweepers all joined the fleet in 1944 and patrolled between Esquimalt and Prince Rupert, British Columbia, joining either escort force until the end of 1945. All eight were decommissioned and seven were sold to commercial interests. The vast majority of them had eventful fates. Daerwood was sold for commercial use on 30 December 1946. The vessel caught fire and sank at Bridgetown, Barbados on 13 October 1973. Cranbrook was purchased by a Nanaimo towing firm in November 1947. In 1950 the vessel's registry disappeared from Lloyd's Registry. Coquitlam was sold in October 1946 and renamed Wilcox. The ship went aground on 17 June 1954 on Anticosti Island and written off. However, the wreck was washed ashore and her hull is still on the beach. Kalamalka was sold in 1946 for conversion to a fishing vessel. The ship burned and sank while fishing in Wallis Bay, British Columbia on 18 March 1968. Lavallee was sold on 13 November 1947 to become fishing vessel of the same name. The ship burned and sank near Burgeo, Newfoundland and Labrador on 1 March 1967. Rossland was sold to Vancouver towing company in 1946 and renamed La Verne. In 1971, the vessel was resold to a US buyer. St. Joseph was sold for commercial use and was a Mexican-flagged cargo vessel until the ship's registry was deleted in 1988.

Revelstoke was the only British Columbia-built vessel to be kept following the war. Revelstoke sailed to Halifax and served as tender to HMCS Stadacona and HMCS Cabot before being decommissioned for the final time on 23 October 1953. The vessel was sold in 1957 and renamed Shirley Ann in 1959. Shirley Ann caught fire and sank off Newfoundland on 12 October 1979.

== Sources ==
- Lenton, H. T. & Colledge, J. J. (1968) [1964]. British & Dominion Warships of World War II. New York: Doubleday and Company. ISBN 0-71100-403-X. OCLC 1366368.
- Macpherson, Ken (1997). Minesweepers of the Royal Canadian Navy 1938–45. St. Catharines, Ontario: Vanwell Publishing Limited. ISBN 0-920277-55-1.
- Macpherson, Ken & Barrie, Ron (2002). The Ships of Canada's Naval Forces 1910–2002 (Third ed.). St. Catharines, Ontario: Vanwell Publishing. ISBN 1-55125-072-1.
