= HMC ML Q053 =

Canadian wooden upgunned submarine chaser

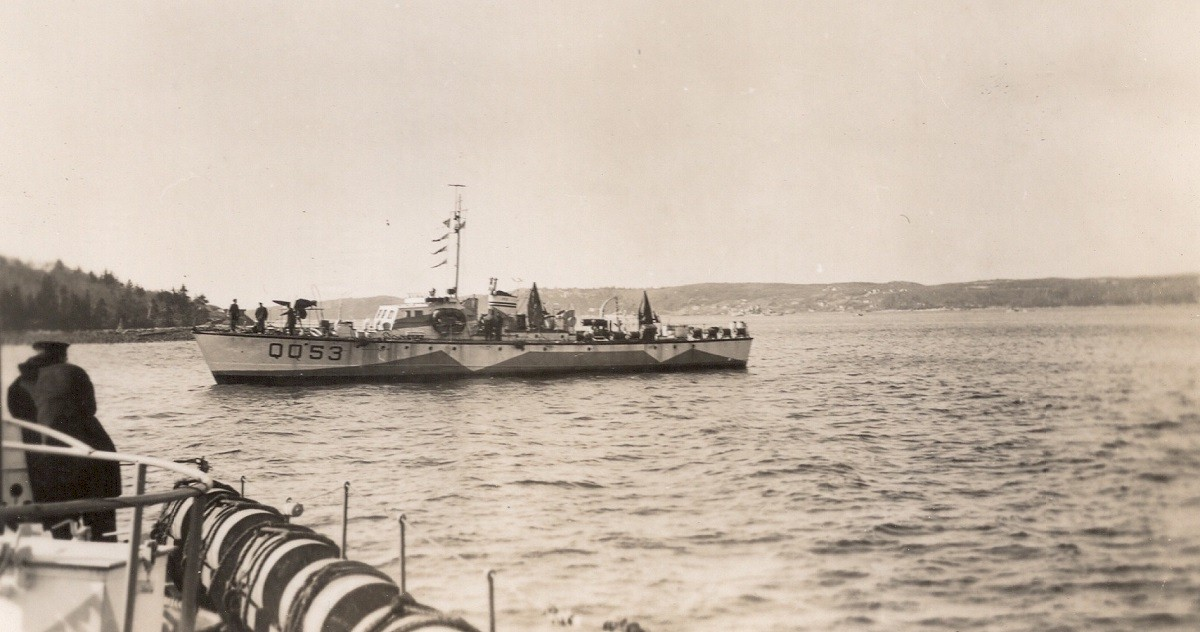
- HMC ML Q053

History

Canada
- Builder: Taylor & Sons, J. J., Toronto, Ontario
- Laid down: 4 February 1941
- Launched: 18 October 1941
- Acquired: 17 November 1941
- Out of service: 13 July 1945
- Home port: Gaspé
- Identification: CML 004; HMC ML Q053

General characteristics
- Class & type: Fairmile B motor launch
- Type: Upgunned sub chaser; Acoustic minesweeper; Rescue boat
- Displacement: 79 long tons
- Length: 112 ft (34 m)
- Beam: 17 ft 0 in (5.18 m)
- Draught: 4 ft 10 in (1.47 m)
- Propulsion: Two 650 bhp (480 kW) Hall-Scott Defender petrol engines
- Speed: 20 knots (37 km/h; 23 mph)
- Range: 1,500 mi (1,300 nmi; 2,400 km) at 12 knots (22 km/h; 14 mph)
- Complement: 2 officers and 14 non-commissioned
- Crew: 16
- Time to activate: 48 hours to reconfigure weapons
- Sensors & processing systems: ASDIC
- Armament: Upgunned sub chaser; 1 x twin 20 mm Oerlikon; 1 x single 20 mm Oerlikon; 2 x twin 0.303 in machine guns; 1 x 3 pdr HA/LA gun; 12 depth charges; 1 x Holman Projector; 1 x Y-gun (4 reloads); Acoustic minesweeper; 1 x twin 20 mm Oerlikon; 1 x single 20 mm Oerlikon; 2 x twin 0.303 in machine guns; 1 x 3 pdr HA/LA gun; 14 depth charges; Rescue boat; 1 x single 20 mm Oerlikon; 2 x twin 0.303 in machine guns; 1 x 2 pdr gun; 6 depth charges
- Armour: Wheelhouse plated

HMC ML Q053 was a wooden Fairmile B motor launch (ML) upgunned submarine chaser delivered to the Royal Canadian Navy (RCN) on 17 November 1941. Originally designed for the Royal Navy by W. J. Holt of the British Admiralty and built by British boatbuilder Fairmile Marine, during the Second World War eighty Fairmile B motor launches were built in Canada for service with the Coastal Forces of the RCN.

== Design ==
Built of double mahogany (diagonally) with an eight-inch (20 cm) oak keel and based on a line of destroyer hulls, the Fairmiles arrived in prefabricated kits to be assembled for the RCN by thirteen different boatyards. In contrast to the British built boats, the Canadian Fairmiles were narrower, had a greater draught, and were slightly more powerful giving the Canadian boats a two-knot (3.7 km/h; 2.3 mph) speed advantage over the British boats. With a fuel capacity of 2,320 imperial gallons (10,500 L; 2,790 US gal) of 87 octane gasoline, the early Fairmiles (Q050 to Q111) were powered by two 650-horsepower (480 kW) engines, could reach a top speed of 20 knots (37 km/h; 23 mph) and a range of 1,925 miles (3,098 km) at 7.5 knots (13.9 km/h; 8.6 mph). Later versions (Q112 to Q129) were fitted with larger 700 hp (520 kW) engines able to achieve a top speed to 22 knots (41 km/h; 25 mph) (max), with a range of 1925 miles at 7.5 knots. Crewed by two or three officers and fourteen sailors, accommodation on the Fairmiles was thought to be "cramped but comfortable".

Another unique design feature of the Fairmile B was that with forty-eight hours' notice each boat could be reconfigured to serve in a different role. Fitted with steel strips and tapped holes to ease equipment swaps, weapons and specialist gear such as torpedo tubes, naval mines, depth charges, and guns could be quickly stripped and attached to the boat. In two days, a Fairmile could have its weapons and equipment reconfigured to serve as an escort, minesweeper, minelayer, navigation leader, coastal raider, patrol boat, ambulance or rescue launch. Armament consisted of three 20 mm Oerlikon guns, mounted forward, aft, and amidships; two .303 machine guns; one 9 mm Sten gun; two .303 rifles; three .45 revolvers; and 20 depth charges of 300 lb (140 kg) each, including eight fitted for the "Y" gun. Each boat was equipped with sonar, radar and WIT.

The first thirty-six Canadian Fairmile B type were designated and painted up as CML 01-36 (coastal motor launch).

== Fairmile flotillas ==
Affectionately known as the little ships, little fighting ships, or Q-boats by their crews, during the Second World War the Fairmile B motor launches of the RCN played a vital role escorting shipping along the St. Lawrence River, in the Gulf of St. Lawrence, and between Newfoundland and the mainland of Canada. Regularly deployed in flotillas of six The Little Ships relieved larger escort craft urgently needed elsewhere by carrying out anti-submarine patrols, port defence and rescue duties. Based out of shore establishments on the St. Lawrence River, Halifax, Saint John, Shelburne, Sydney, and on the Canadian West Coast; at sea the RCN Fairmile fleets were accompanied by two "mother ships" HMCS Preserver and HMCS Provider providing fresh water, fuel and medical services.

== Operational history ==
While she flew the White Ensign, ML Q053 was not a commissioned ship of the RCN but was rather listed as a tender to escort depot ship HMCS Sambro. Listed as part of the 71st Flotilla - Halifax L.D. Force, on 8 June 1943 Q053 was credited with recovering an intact mine laid in the Halifax approaches by the German submarine U-119. While following minesweeper HMS BYMS 2189, the crew of Q053 observed a floating mine cut loose by the sweeper and with a 90-yard (82 m) tow line attached, moved the mine to Ketch Harbour. Not knowing if the mine was magnetic or time-fuzed to explode after surfacing, during the long tow to harbour, the crew of Q053 were kept forward under cover. Once the mine was brought ashore, crewmembers Lt George Rundle and LS Lancien, removed the access plate to the mine, cut the electrical wiring and extracted the detonator and primer. "For displaying gallantry, skill and coolness in carrying out hazardous duties" Lt George Rundle was awarded the George Medal and LS Lancien the British Empire Medal.

In December 1944, Q053 was listed as part of the RCN North-West Atlantic Command Gaspé Force (Administered by N.O. i/c., Gaspé), 71st Motor Launch Flotilla. After the war, she was sold for C$7,900 and renamed Aloma III under new ownership with the War Assets Corporation (WAC) to Marine Industries Ltd. Sorel. She was later sold to Consolidated Shipbuilding Corp., Morris Heights, New York. Her final disposition is unknown.

== Gallery ==
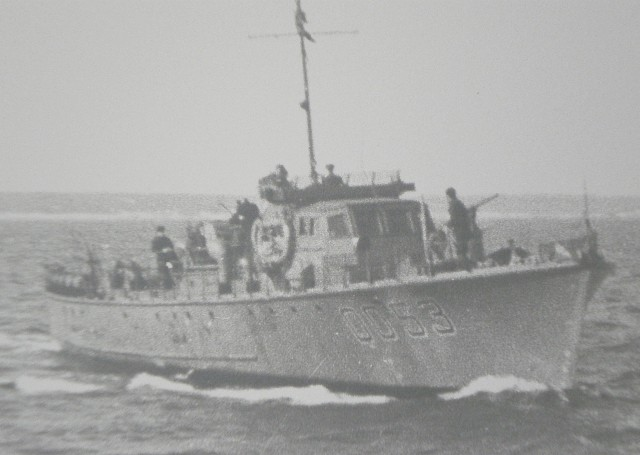

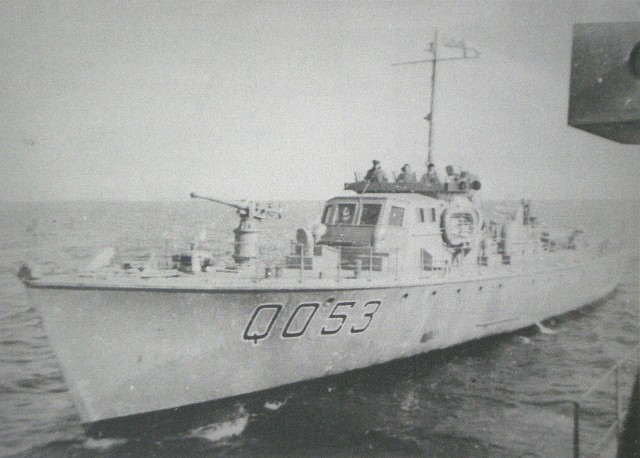

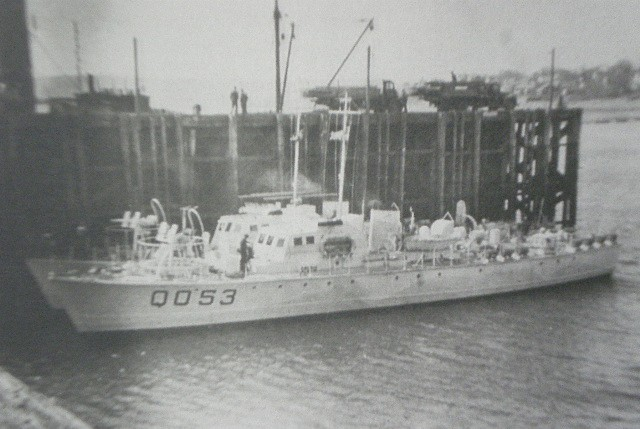

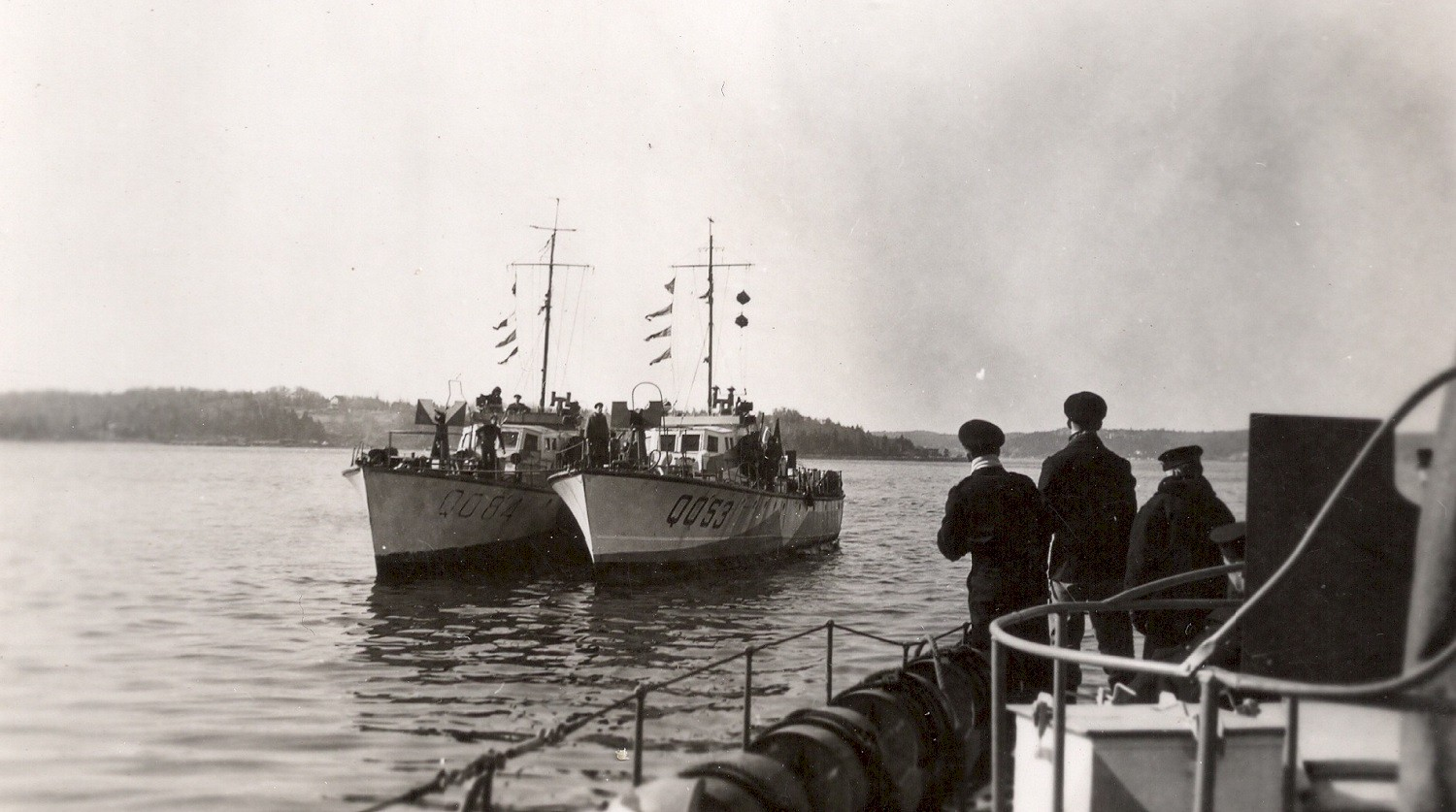
