= HMCS La Malbaie =

Flower-class corvette

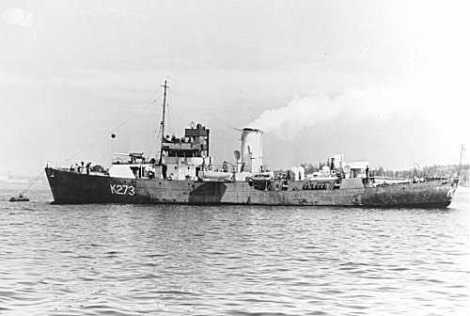
- HMCS La Malbaie

History

Canada
- Name: La Malbaie
- Namesake: La Malbaie, Quebec
- Ordered: 20 February 1941
- Builder: Marine Industries. Ltd., Sorel
- Laid down: 22 March 1941
- Launched: 25 October 1941
- Commissioned: 28 April 1942
- Decommissioned: 28 June 1945
- Renamed: from Fort William K236
- Identification: Pennant number: K273
- Honours and awards: Atlantic 1942–1945; Gulf of St. Lawrence 1942
- Fate: Scrapped 1951 at Hamilton.

General characteristics
- Class & type: Flower-class corvette (Revised)
- Displacement: 925 long tons (940 t; 1,036 short tons)
- Length: 205 ft (62.48 m)o/a
- Beam: 33 ft (10.06 m)
- Draught: 11.5 ft (3.51 m)
- Propulsion: Single shaft; 2 × water tube boilers; 1 × double acting triple-expansion reciprocating steam engine; 2,750 ihp (2,050 kW)
- Speed: 16 knots (29.6 km/h)
- Range: 3,500 nautical miles (6,482 km) at 12 knots (22.2 km/h)
- Complement: 85
- Sensors & processing systems: 1 × SW1C or 2C radar; 1 × Type 123A or Type 127DV sonar
- Armament: 1 × BL 4 in (102 mm) Mk.IX gun; 2 × .50 cal machine gun (twin); 2 × Lewis .303 cal machine gun (twin); 2 × Mk.II depth charge throwers; 2 × depth charge rails with 40 depth charges

HMCS La Malbaie was a Royal Canadian Navy revised Flower-class corvette which took part in convoy escort duties during the Second World War. She fought primarily in the Battle of the Atlantic. She was named for La Malbaie, Quebec. She was originally named Fort William but her name was changed before commissioning.

== Background ==
Flower-class corvettes like La Malbaie serving with the Royal Canadian Navy during the Second World War were different from earlier and more traditional sail-driven corvettes. The "corvette" designation was created by the French as a class of small warships; the Royal Navy borrowed the term for a period but discontinued its use in 1877. During the hurried preparations for war in the late 1930s, Winston Churchill reactivated the corvette class, needing a name for smaller ships used in an escort capacity, in this case based on a whaling ship design. The generic name "flower" was used to designate the class of these ships, which – in the Royal Navy – were named after flowering plants.

Corvettes commissioned by the Royal Canadian Navy during the Second World War were named after communities for the most part, to better represent the people who took part in building them. This idea was put forth by Admiral Percy W. Nelles. Sponsors were commonly associated with the community for which the ship was named. Royal Navy corvettes were designed as open sea escorts, while Canadian corvettes were developed for coastal auxiliary roles which was exemplified by their minesweeping gear. Eventually the Canadian corvettes would be modified to allow them to perform better on the open seas.

== Construction ==
La Malbaie was ordered 20 February 1941 as part of the Revised 1940–41 Flower class building program. This revised program radically changed the look of the Flower-class corvette. The ships of this program kept the water-tube boilers of the initial 1940–41 program, but now they were housed in separate compartments for safety. The fo'c'sle was extended, which allowed more space for berths for the crew, leading to an expansion of the crew. The bow had increased flare for better control in heavy seas. The revised Flowers of the RCN received an additional two depth charge throwers fitted amidships and more depth charges. They also came with heavier secondary armament with 20-mm anti-aircraft guns carried on the extended bridge wings. All this led to an increase in displacement, draught and length.

La Malbaie was laid down by Marine Industries Ltd. at Sorel on 22 March 1941 and launched on 25 October of that year. She was commissioned into the RCN on 28 April 1942 at Sorel. During her career she had two significant refits. The work for her first overhaul was done at Halifax from 11 August to 20 December 1942 after La Malbaie had developed mechanical trouble (what was this?). The second was done from mid-September to mid-December 1943 at Liverpool, Nova Scotia.

During her construction, photos of her were taken before her launching. These photos served as the model for the 1942 20-cent Canadian postage stamp.

== War service ==
La Malbaie arrived at Halifax 13 May 1942 for deployment. She joined the Western Local Escort Force (WLEF) in late June 1942 after workups. She developed mechanical issues (which?) not long after and went for a refit at Halifax. After workups she transferred to the Mid-Ocean Escort Force where she was assigned to escort group C-3.

She served with C-3 as a trans-Atlantic convoy escort from January 1943 until September when she departed for another refit. After workups she returned to C-3 and remained with them until December 1944. In December she joined Halifax Force and remained with them until the end of the war.

== Post-war service ==
After the cessation of hostilities, La Malbaie was paid off at Sorel, Quebec 28 June 1945. She was transferred to the War Assets Corporation for disposal and sold for scrapping on 17 October 1945. She was broken up at Hamilton, Ontario in 1951.
