= HMCS Brantford =

Flower-class corvette

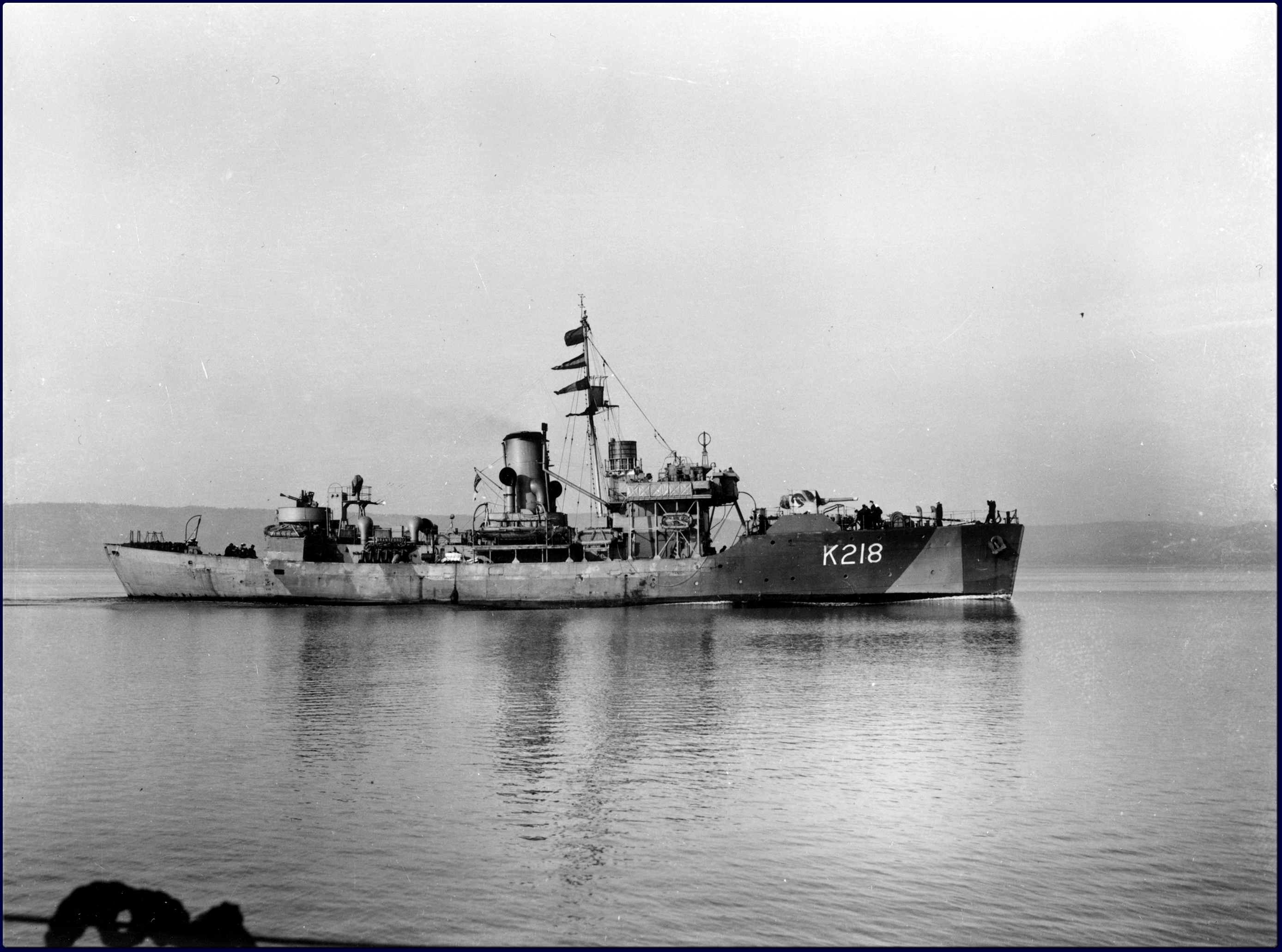
- HMCS Brantford

History

Canada
- Name: Brantford
- Namesake: Brantford, Ontario
- Builder: Midland Shipyards Ltd., Midland
- Laid down: 24 February 1941
- Launched: 6 September 1941
- Commissioned: 15 May 1942
- Decommissioned: 17 August 1945
- Identification: Pennant number: K218
- Honours and awards: Atlantic 1942–45, Gulf of St. Lawrence 1942
- Fate: Sold for mercantile conversion, scrapped 1976

General characteristics
- Class & type: Flower-class corvette
- Displacement: 950 long tons (970 t)
- Length: 205 ft 1 in (62.51 m) o/a
- Beam: 33 ft 1 in (10.08 m)
- Draught: 13 ft 5 in (4.09 m)
- Propulsion: single shaft; 2 × water-tube boilers; 1 × 4-cylinder triple-expansion reciprocating steam engine; 2,750 ihp (2,050 kW)
- Speed: 16 knots (30 km/h; 18 mph)
- Range: 3,450 nmi (6,390 km; 3,970 mi) at 12 kn (22 km/h; 14 mph)
- Complement: 47
- Sensors & processing systems: 1 × SW1C or 2C radar; 1 × Type 123A or Type 127DV sonar
- Armament: 1 × BL 4-inch (102 mm) Mk.IX single gun; 2 × .50 cal machine gun (twin); 2 × Lewis .303 cal machine gun (twin); 2 × Mk.II depth charge throwers; 2 × depth charge rails with 40 depth charges

HMCS Brantford was a Flower-class corvette that served in the Royal Canadian Navy during the Second World War. The corvette was named for Brantford, Ontario. She served primarily as a convoy escort in the Battle of the Atlantic until 1944 when the vessel became a training ship attached to HMCS Cornwallis. Following the war, the corvette was converted into a whaling ship and renamed Olympic Arrow in 1950. In 1956, the ship was sold and renamed Otori Maru No.14 and again in 1961 as Kyo Maru No.21. In 1972, the vessel was converted to a tugboat and renamed Daito Maru No.71. The ship was broken up for scrap in 1976.

== Design and description ==
Flower-class corvettes such as Brantford serving with the Royal Canadian Navy (RCN) in the Second World War were different from earlier and more traditional sail-driven corvettes. The Flower-class corvettes originated from a need that arose in 1938 to expand the Royal Navy following the Munich Crisis. A design request went out for a small escort for coastal convoys. Based on a traditional whaler-type design, the initial Canadian ships of the Flower class had a standard displacement of 950 long tons (970 t). They were 205 feet 1 inch (62.51 m) long overall with a beam of 33 feet 1 inch (10.08 m) and a maximum draught of 13 feet 5 inches (4.09 m). The initial 1939–1940 corvettes were powered by a four-cylinder vertical triple expansion engine powered by steam from two Scotch boilers turning one three-bladed propeller rated at 2,800 indicated horsepower (2,100 kW). The Scotch boilers were replaced with water-tube boilers in later 1939–1940 and 1940–1941 Programme ships. The corvettes had a maximum speed of 16 knots (30 km/h; 18 mph). This gave them a range of 3,450 nautical miles (6,390 km; 3,970 mi) at 12 knots (22 km/h; 14 mph). The vessels were extremely wet.

The Canadian Flower-class vessels were initially armed with a Mk IX BL 4-inch (102 mm) gun forward on a CP 1 mounting and carried 100 rounds per gun. The corvettes were also armed with a QF Vickers 2-pounder (40 mm, 1.6 in) gun on a bandstand aft, two single-mounted .303 Vickers machine guns or Browning 0.5-calibre machine guns for anti-aircraft defence and two twin-mounted .303 Lewis machine guns, usually sited on bridge wings. For anti-submarine warfare, they mounted two depth charge throwers and initially carried 25 depth charges. The corvettes were designed with a Type 123 ASDIC sonar set installed. The Flower-class ships had a complement of 47 officers and ratings. The Royal Canadian Navy initially ordered 54 corvettes in 1940 and these were fitted with Mark II Oropesa minesweeping gear used for destroying contact mines. Part of the depth charge rails were made portable so the minesweeping gear could be utilised.

=== Modifications ===
In Canadian service the vessels were altered due to experience with the design's deficiencies. The galley was moved further back in the ship and the mess and sleeping quarters combined. A wireless direction finding set was installed, and enlarged bilge keels were installed to reduce rolling. After the first 35–40 corvettes had been constructed, the foremast was shifted aft of the bridge and the mainmast was eliminated. Corvettes were first fitted with basic SW-1 and SW-2 CQ surface warning radar, notable for their fishbone-like antenna and reputation for failure in poor weather or in the dark. The compass house was moved further aft and the open-type bridge was situated in front of it. The ASDIC hut was moved in front and to a lower position on the bridge. The improved Type 271 radar was placed aft, with some units receiving Type 291 radar for air search. The minesweeping gear, a feature of the first 54 corvettes, was removed. Most Canadian Flower-class corvettes had their forecastles extended which improved crew accommodation and seakeeping. However, Brantford was the only member of initial 1940–41 building programme to not receive this modification during construction. Some of the corvettes were rearmed with Hedgehog anti-submarine mortars. The complements of the ships grew throughout the war rising from the initial 47 to as many as 104.

== Construction and career ==
Brantford was ordered as part of the 1940–1941 Flower-class building program. Brantford was laid down on 24 February 1941 by Midland Shipyards Ltd. at Midland, Ontario. The British Admiralty sought to improve the corvette design, incorporating new technologies and modifications to keep the ships in better operation. However, these plans were shared with Canada only in April 1941, after construction of Brantford has already begun. The vessel was launched on 6 September 1941 and named for the town of Brantford, Ontario. (Note: The British named their ships after flowers and plants as a continuation of a class name from the First World War but Canada chose to name those ships not transferred to the Royal Navy after towns and villages.) She was commissioned on 15 May 1942 at Montreal, Quebec, and sailed for Halifax, Nova Scotia, arriving on 30 May.

After working up, Brantford joined the Western Local Escort Force (WLEF) in July 1942 as a convoy escort in western Atlantic waters. When WLEF reorganized into escort groups in June 1943 Brantford was assigned to group W-3. The corvette underwent her first refit in mid-1943 at Quebec City. In April 1944 she joined group W-2. In June 1944, Brantford was loaned to the Mid-Ocean Escort Force escort group C-3 for one round trip to the United Kingdom, protecting the convoys HX 294 and ONS 242. After completing her second refit at Sydney, Nova Scotia, in September 1944, Brantford was assigned to HMCS Cornwallis as a training ship. She remained in this capacity until the end of the war. For service in the Second World War, Brantford was awarded the battle honours "Atlantic 1942–45" and "Gulf of St. Lawrence 1942".

=== Post-war service ===
Brantford was paid off 17 August 1945 at Sorel, Quebec. She sailed to Halifax and was handed over to the War Assets Corporation who in turn, sold her to George E. Irving of New Brunswick. She was sold for conversion to a whale catcher of 714 gross register tons (GRT) and reappeared in 1950 as Olympic Arrow, operating under the Honduran flag. In 1956 she was sold again and renamed Otori Maru No.14. In 1961 she was renamed Kyo Maru No.21. In 1972 the ship was converted to a tugboat of 724 tons and was renamed Daito Maru No.71. She last appeared on Lloyd's Register in 1972–73. The ship was broken up in 1976.
