= Armed yacht =

Yacht fitted with weapons

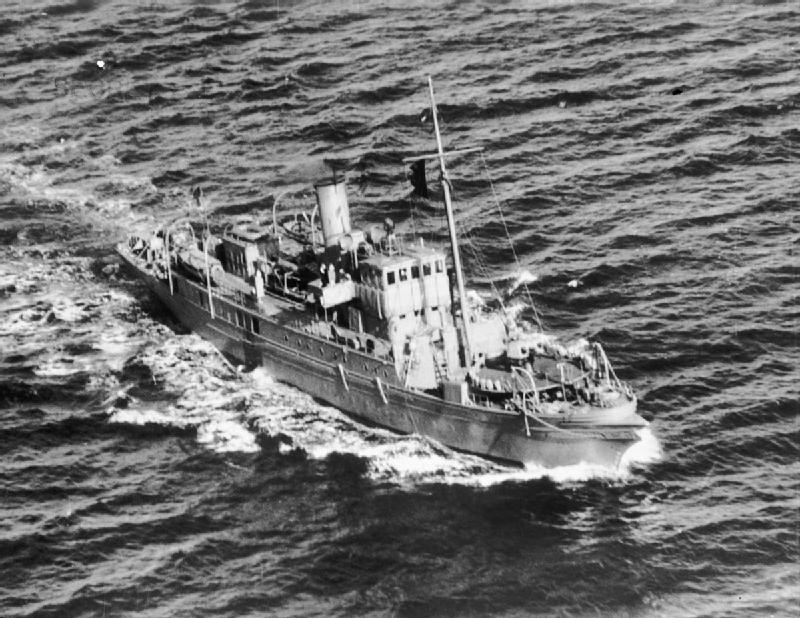
The British anti-submarine yacht HMS Tuscarora during World War II. It had been built in 1897 as a luxury steam yacht.

An armed yacht was a yacht that was armed with weapons and was typically in the service of a navy. The word "yacht" ("hunter"; Dutch "jacht"; German "jagd", literally meaning "to hunt") was originally applied to small, fast and agile naval vessels suited to piracy and to employment by navies and coast guards against smugglers and pirates. Vessels of this type were adapted to racing by wealthy owners. The origin of civilian yachts as naval vessels, with their speed and maneuverability, made them useful for adaptation to their original function as patrol vessels. In the United States Navy armed yachts were typically private yachts expropriated for government use in times of war. Armed yachts served as patrol vessels during the Spanish–American War and the World Wars. In the latter conflicts, armed yachts were used as patrol vessels, convoy escorts, and in anti-submarine duties. In the United States, yachts were purchased from their owners with the owners given an option to repurchase their yacht at the close of hostilities.

== History ==
=== World War I ===
Before the outbreak of war in Europe, there had been much discussion in the United Kingdom of a wartime role for privately owned motor and steam yachts and smaller power boats. This led to Admiral Sir Frederick Inglefield forming a Motor Boat Reserve Committee in 1912 to consider whether this would be useful and how it could be achieved. In early 1914 the Admiralty created a Motor Boat Reserve with experienced volunteers from various yacht clubs. At the start of the war in August 1914, the reserve was activated under the title Royal Naval Motor Boat Reserve (RNMBR). Eventually, the RNMBR was incorporated into the Auxiliary Patrol and its crews into the Royal Naval Volunteer Reserve (RNVR). By December 1914, each sea area of the British Isles was allocated a dedicated unit of the Auxiliary Patrol, typically comprising six armed trawlers or drifters and a single armed yacht, together with smaller motor boats, with the roles of harbour defence, mine clearance and anti-submarine patrolling. The crews were augmented by volunteers from all over the British Empire. By 1917, there were 150 patrol units, each led by an armed yacht, usually equipped with radio. In the course of the war, a total of 159 motor yachts were hired by the Admiralty, some serving as far away as the Dardanelles. The British armed yacht HMS Lorna destroyed the German U-boat SM UB-74 with depth charges off Portland Bill in May 1918. A number of motor yachts operated as patrol boats in the waters of British Dominions and colonies, including Nusa, a German yacht which was captured in the Solomon Islands in September 1914 and was later used by the Royal Australian Navy in their home waters.

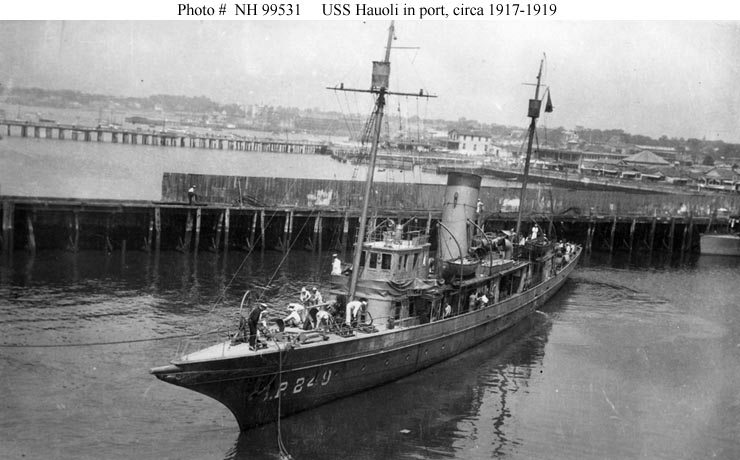
USS Hauoli, a former luxury steam yacht. This patrol vessel served as USS California from December 1917 until February 1918 in the harbor defense role, when she was renamed Hauoli and used for anti-submarine research.

On the entry of the United States into the war in April 1917, a large number of motor yachts were acquired by the US Navy and Coast Guard. In the coastal waters of France, there was a considerable U-boat threat to the shipping required to transport and supply the American Expeditionary Force, and the only available warships were six armed yachts which were formed into the US Patrol Squadron Operating in European Waters. The squadron left New York Navy Yard on 4 June 1917 and crossing via Bermuda and the Azores, arrived in Brest on 4 July. A second and third squadron arrived during the same month, their colourful dazzle camouflage giving rise to the nickname "the Easter egg fleet". Reinforcements of armed trawlers and destroyers arrived in October, however the yachts remained active with the force until the end of the war. Surfaced U-boats were engaged with gunfire in the early months and in 1918, two submarines were claimed to have been destroyed with depth charges, but neither of these claims were supported by post-war research.

=== World War II ===
During World War II, the US navy commandeered small vessels, including private yachts, and requisitioned them to patrol US coastal waters and the Gulf of Mexico against German U-boats. In the Gulf, the boats ventured out for 12 miles. The US Coast Guard Auxiliary was formed to man the vessels, but their crews were inexperienced and untrained. They had absolutely no navigation equipment, and, consequently, the crew often had no idea where they were. The boats were equipped with radios, which, in theory, were to be used to report any U-boat sightings. In practice, however, reporting a U-boat's position was impossible due to the crew's lack of bearings. The men on board spent their time scanning the horizon with binoculars, having been given pictures and silhouettes of the different types of U-boats so that they would be able to identify them.

Some of these boats were armed with a .50 caliber machine gun in the bow and four depth charges on racks in the stern, although actually attacking a U-boat was probably suicidal. The lopsided battle would have conceivably ended with the U-boat using its deck guns to blow up the patrol yacht (since scoring a hit with a torpedo was improbable).

The Royal Canadian Navy also commandeered and used armed yachts and other such vessels for anti-submarine patrols, having 12 of them.

== Notable armed yachts ==
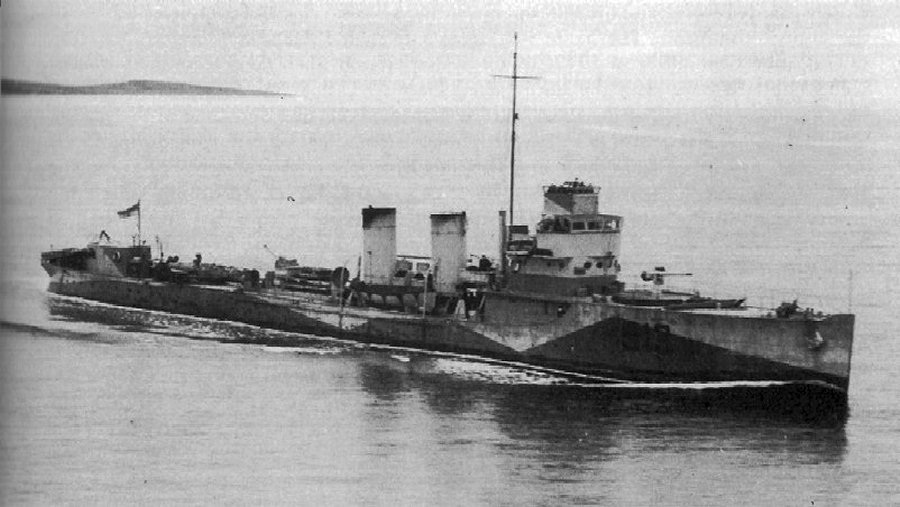
The Canadian armed yacht HMCS Renard in World War II. The same yacht had served as USS Winchester in World War I.

=== Canada ===
- HMCS Ambler (Q11)
- HMCS Beaver (S10)
- HMCS Caribou (S12)
- HMCS Cougar (Z15)
- HMCS Husky
- HMCS Lynx
- HMCS Otter
- HMCS Raccoon
- HMCS Stadacona

=== United Kingdom ===
- HMS Adventuress
- HMS Evadne
- HMS Philante, after 1947 HNoMY Norge, the Norwegian royal yacht
- HMS Sumar
- HMS Tuscarora

=== United States ===
- USS Aloha (SP-317)
- USS Artemis (SP-593)
- USS Barnegat (SP-1232)
- USS California (SP-249)
- USS Corsair (SP-159)
- USS Cythera (SP-575)
- USS Dauntless (PG-61)
- USS Druid (SP-321)
- USS Galatea (SP-714)
- USS Gloucester (1891)
- USS Helenita (SP-210)
- USS Hilo (AGP-2)
- USS Isabel (PY-10)
- USS Jamestown (PG-55)
- USS Lydonia (SP-700)
- USS Margaret (SP-527)
- USS May (SP-164)
- USS Mayflower (PY-1)
- USS Montauk (SP-392)
- USS Nemesis (SP-343)-WWI USNRF Base Section 5 located in West Sayville, New York. One of the search and rescue vessels for USS San Diego sunk off Fire Island, New York on 18 July 1918.
- USS Niagara (PG-52)
- USS Noma (SP-131)
- USS Nourmahal (PG-72)
- USS Plymouth (PG-57)
- USS Rambler (SP-211)
- USS See W. See (SP-740)- WWI USNF Base Section 5 located in West Sayville, New York. She was one of the search and rescue vessels responded to the sinking of USS San Diego off Fire Island, New York on 18 July 1918. Later renamed Mar-Sue.
- USS St. Augustine (PG-54)
- USS Sultana (SP-134)
- USS Sunbeam III (SP-251)-WWI USNRF Base Section 5 located in West Sayville, New York. She was one of the three vessels from USNRF Section Base 5 that responded to the sinking of USS San Diego on 18 July 1918 for search and rescue.
- USS Sylph (PY-12)
- USS Venetia (SP-431)
- USS Vixen (1896)
- USS Vixen (PG-53)
- USS Wadena (SP-158)
- USS Wenonah (SP-165)
- USS Williamsburg (PG-56)
- USS Winchester (SP-156)

== See also ==
- Patrol boat
- PT boat
- U-boat
