= HMCS Reindeer =

History
- Name: Josephine; Mascotte
- Builder: Newport News S.B. Co, Newport News
- Way number: 305
- Launched: 20 March 1926
- Fate: Taken over by Royal Canadian Navy 1940

Canada
- Name: Reindeer
- Namesake: Reindeer
- Acquired: 1940
- Commissioned: 25 July 1940
- Decommissioned: 20 July 1945
- Identification: Pennant number: S08
- Honours and awards: Gulf of St. Lawrence 1942
- Fate: Sold

General characteristics
- Type: Armed yacht
- Displacement: 337 long tons (342 t)
- Length: 140 ft (42.7 m)
- Beam: 24 ft (7.3 m)
- Draught: 9 ft (2.7 m)
- Propulsion: 2 Winton diesel engines, 2 shafts
- Speed: 11 knots (20 km/h; 13 mph)
- Complement: 40
- Armament: 1 × 4 in (102 mm) gun

HMCS Reindeer was an armed yacht that served in the Royal Canadian Navy during the Second World War. She served mainly in local waters, escorting convoys until becoming a training ship at Halifax, Nova Scotia at the end of 1942. The ship remained as such until being paid off to reserve in 1945 and was sold. Constructed as Josephine in 1926 in the United States and renamed Mascotte, the yacht was acquired by the Royal Canadian Navy in 1940. Following the war, the vessel was sold.

== Description ==
Constructed as a yacht, the vessel was 140 ft (42.7 m) long overall with a beam of 24 ft (7.3 m) and a draught of 9 ft (2.7 m) with a tonnage of 337 gross register tons (GRT). The yacht was powered by two Winton diesel engines driving two shafts. This gave the vessel a maximum speed of 11 knots (20 km/h; 13 mph). In Canadian service as Reindeer, the ship was armed with one 4-inch (102 mm) naval gun mounted forward and had a complement of 5 officers and 35 crew.

== Service history ==
Josephine was constructed by Newport News S.B. Co at their yard in Newport News, Virginia with the yard number 305. The yacht was launched on 20 March 1926. At some point, the yacht was renamed Mascotte.

After failing to acquire any British vessels at the outset of the war for auxiliary purposes, the Royal Canadian Navy discreetly searched the American market for suitable ships. However, American law prevented the sale of ships for possible use in the war to any of the belligerents. The Royal Canadian Navy requisitioned unsuitable Canadian yachts and had their respective owners go the United States and buy those ships the navy wanted as replacements. Once the ships arrived in Canada, the navy then returned the original yachts and requisitioned the new ones. Mascotte was one such vessel and was purchased in 1940 and sent to Quebec City, Quebec for conversion to an armed yacht.

Once there, the ship had the 4-inch gun installed forward. Renamed Reindeer, the vessel made its way to Halifax, Nova Scotia where she was commissioned on 25 July 1940. The ship was assigned to Sydney Force based out of Sydney, Nova Scotia, as a coastal escort remaining with them until December, when she returned to Halifax for the winter. During 1940, Reindeer supported slow convoys traversing Canadian waters.

In July 1941 Reindeer joined the Gaspé Force. The armed yacht was one of four ships that arrived at Gaspé, Quebec in August to establish the force. Reindeer transferred to the Halifax Local Defence Force by the end of the year. In 1942 the ship spent time with the Sydney Force and the local escorts working out of Saint John, New Brunswick. In November 1942, there was a mutiny aboard the ship to protest against the captain. On 24 December 1942 she became a training vessel with HMCS Cornwallis for anti-submarine training purposes working with Royal Navy submarines on loan.

In 1943, Reindeer, still serving in that capacity, transferred with the establishment to Digby, Nova Scotia and remained there until the end of the war except for one stint at Saint John. The vessel was paid off at Sydney on 20 July 1945 and placed in reserve. Reindeer was put up for disposal on 4 October 1945. Reindeer was sold along with armed yachts Husky and Caribou to the Margaree Steamships Company.

== See also ==
- List of ships of the Canadian Navy
- HMS Reindeer
