= Q11 =

Q11 may refer to:

- Q11 (New York City bus)
- ARA Comodoro Rivadavia (Q-11), a survey ship of the Argentine Navy
- DZOE-TV, formerly Q-11
- HMCS Ambler (Q11), an armed yacht of the Royal Canadian Navy
- Hud (surah), of the Quran
- Motorola Q11, a Motorola smartphone
