= HMCS Caribou =

Armed yacht of the Royal Canadian Navy

History
- Name: Memory III (1928–1933); Elfreda (1933–1940); Marita II (1940)
- Builder: Defoe Shipbuilding Company, Bay City, Michigan
- Yard number: 126
- Launched: 1928
- Fate: Acquired by Royal Canadian Navy 1940

Canada
- Name: Caribou
- Acquired: 1940
- Commissioned: 27 May 1940
- Decommissioned: 20 July 1945
- Identification: Pennant number: S12/Z25
- Fate: Sold for commercial use 1946

History
- Name: Inca Beatrix (1946–1951); Cougar (1951–1963)
- In service: 1946
- Fate: Deleted 1963

General characteristics
- Type: Armed yacht
- Displacement: 306 long tons (311 t)
- Length: 142 ft (43 m)
- Beam: 23 ft (7.0 m)
- Draught: 9 ft (2.7 m)
- Propulsion: 2 shafts, diesel engine
- Speed: 11 knots (20 km/h; 13 mph)
- Complement: 40
- Armament: 1 × QF 12-pounder 12 cwt naval gun

HMCS Caribou was an armed yacht that served in the Royal Canadian Navy during the Second World War. Originally named Memory III, the vessel was renamed Elfreda while in private use as a personal yacht. After her commissioning and renaming to Caribou, she was used as a patrol and training vessel on the East coast of Canada. Following the war the ship was sold for commercial use until her registry was deleted in 1963.

== Description ==
As built the yacht was 129 feet (39.2 m) long between perpendiculars with a beam of 23 feet (7.1 m). The vessel had a gross register tonnage (GRT) of 306 and was powered by a diesel engine driving two shafts. As an armed yacht, Caribou was 142 feet (43 m) long overall with a beam of 23 feet (7.0 m) and a draught of 9 feet (2.7 m). Caribou had a maximum speed of 11 knots (20 km/h; 13 mph) and was armed with one QF 12-pounder 12 cwt naval gun and depth charges. (Note: "QF" is the abbreviation for quick-firing gun. "Cwt" is the abbreviation for hundredweight, 12 cwt referring to the weight of the gun.) The vessel was equipped with an ASDIC set for anti-submarine warfare. In Canadian service the ship had a complement of 5 officers and 35 crew.

== Service history ==
=== As a yacht ===
Constructed by Defoe Shipbuilding Co. at Bay City, Michigan with the yard number 126, the yacht was launched in 1928 as Memory III on behalf of A.E. Fitkin and registered in New York City. The vessel was sold to Sherburn M. Becker in 1930, retaining the name Memory III and remained registered in New York City. Becker sold the yacht in 1933 to H.B.H. Ripley of New York City, who renamed her Elfreda.

=== In Canadian service ===
After failing to acquire any British vessels at the outset of the Second World War for auxiliary purposes, the Royal Canadian Navy discreetly searched the American market for suitable ships. However, American law prevented the sale of ships for possible use in the war to any of the belligerents. The Royal Canadian Navy, requisitioned unsuitable Canadian yachts and had their respective owners go the United States and buy those ships the Navy wanted as replacements. Once the ships arrived in Canada, the navy then returned the original yachts and requisitioned the new ones. Elfreda was one such ship and was acquired and renamed Marita II before being handed over to the Royal Canadian Navy in 1940.

Renamed Caribou and commissioned at Halifax, Nova Scotia on 27 May 1940 with the pennant number S12, later Z25, the ship sailed to Quebec City, Quebec for conversion to an armed yacht. There the 12-pounder naval gun was installed forward. Upon her return to Halifax following the conversion, the vessel was employed as a guard ship at the entrance to Bedford Basin. In August 1941, Caribou underwent a refit. After returning to service in November, she was used as a patrol vessel. On 19 November 1941 the ship had a serious galley fire that sent her back to harbour until February 1942. In March 1942 the ship was re-assigned to the patrol force operating out of Saint John, New Brunswick. She and fellow armed yacht HMCS Husky were the only warships patrolling the Bay of Fundy and the approaches to Saint John until the arrival of motor launches in October. She remained with the force until 31 July 1942 when the vessel returned to Halifax for inspection and was found unfit.

Caribou was then assigned to harbour duty as a training ship as part of HMCS Cornwallis. She remained in this capacity until September 1943 when she moved first to Saint John as a training ship. The ship finished the war as a training ship at Digby, Nova Scotia. She was paid off on 20 July 1945 and put up for disposal on 4 September 1945 along with HMCS Elk. The vessel sold for commercial use in 1946.

=== Postwar service ===
Caribou was sold along with armed yachts Husky and Reindeer to the Margaree Steamships Company. Caribou was sold in 1946 to Inter Caribbean Sg Co and registered in Aruba. The ship was renamed Inca Beatrix. In 1951, the vessel was returned to the name Caribou and continued under that name until 1963 when her registry was deleted.
