= Yacht Goizeko Izarra =

Yachts that have been called Goizeko-Izarra, which means "Morning Star" in the Basque language, include:

- Tuscarora, launched in 1897, which was called Goizeko-Izzara from 1911 to 1922;
- Warrior, launched in 1904, which was called Goizeko-Izzara from 1920 to 1930.
