= Benjamin Brewster (financier) =

American businessman

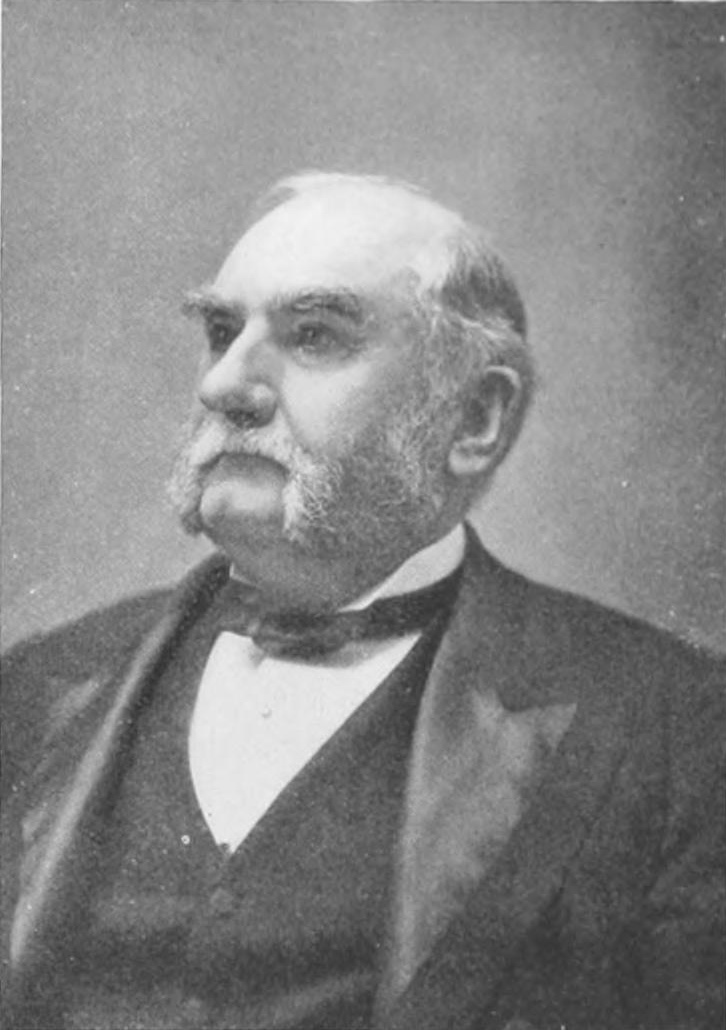
Benjamin Brewster

Benjamin Brewster (June 30, 1828 – August 23, 1897) was an American industrialist, financier, and one of the original trustees of Standard Oil.

== Early life ==
Coat of arms of William Brewster

Brewster was born in 1828 in Norwich, Connecticut, to Patrick Brewster (fourth great-grandson of Mayflower Pilgrim William Brewster) and Catharine Fanny Roath. He attended public schools in Norwich and went to work as a clerk in New York City.

== Business career ==
In 1849 he headed West to join the California Gold Rush, establishing a general mercantile store in San Francisco soon after his arrival. His partner in this enterprise was Oliver Burr Jennings, and together they amassed a considerable fortune.

Brewster returned East in 1874 and settled permanently in New York City. Following his former partner Oliver Burr Jennings, who had married the sister of William Rockefeller's wife, he became involved with John D. Rockefeller in organizing the Standard Oil Company. When the Standard Oil Trust was formed in 1882 he served as a trustee.

Brewster was prominently associated with the building of the Manhattan Elevated Railway and was also a financial leader in many large railroad transactions, particularly the reorganization of the Chicago, St. Paul, Minneapolis and Omaha Railway. He served as vice president of the Chicago, Rock Island and Pacific Railroad and was a director of the Chicago and Eastern Illinois Railroad and the Delaware and Hudson Canal Company. He was also a director of the International Navigation Company, owner of the American Line of steamers.

== Family and death ==
On June 9, 1863, Brewster married Elmina Hersey Dows, daughter of James Dows and Elmina Hersey, in San Francisco. They had seven children:

- James Dows Brewster (March 24, 1864 – August 29, 1864)
- Catherine Elmina Brewster (August 16, 1865 – June 6, 1866)
- William Brewster (January 25, 1867 – October 27, 1867)
- George Stephenson Brewster (b. September 15, 1868). His granddaughter Sheila Brewster Rauch (b. 1949) married Joseph P. Kennedy II (b. 1952); their son, Joseph P. Kennedy III (b. 4 Oct 1980), represented Massachusetts's 4th Congressional District in the U.S. House of Representatives from 2013 to 2021.
- Mary Dows Brewster (b. January 2, 1871, married Oliver Gould Jennings, son of Oliver Burr Jennings and Esther Judson Goodsell; mother of Benjamin Brewster Jennings)
- Frederick Foster Brewster (b. August 13, 1872)
- Robert Stanton Brewster (b. September 27, 1875)

In 1890, Brewster built a summer home in Cazenovia, New York, which he named "Scrooby" after the English manor house where his ancestor William Brewster lived before setting sail on the Mayflower. The building now houses The Brewster Inn.

Benjamin Brewster died at his home in Cazenovia in 1897 at the age of 69. The pallbearers were John D. Rockefeller, Ransom Reed Cable, Charles S. Fairchild, Roswell P. Flower, Clement Griscom, Walter Jennings, Charles A. Peabody, Henry H. Rogers, Henry W. Curtis, William M. Burr, and Henry H. Porter.
