= HMS Tuscarora =

Steam yacht, armed yacht, and merchant ship

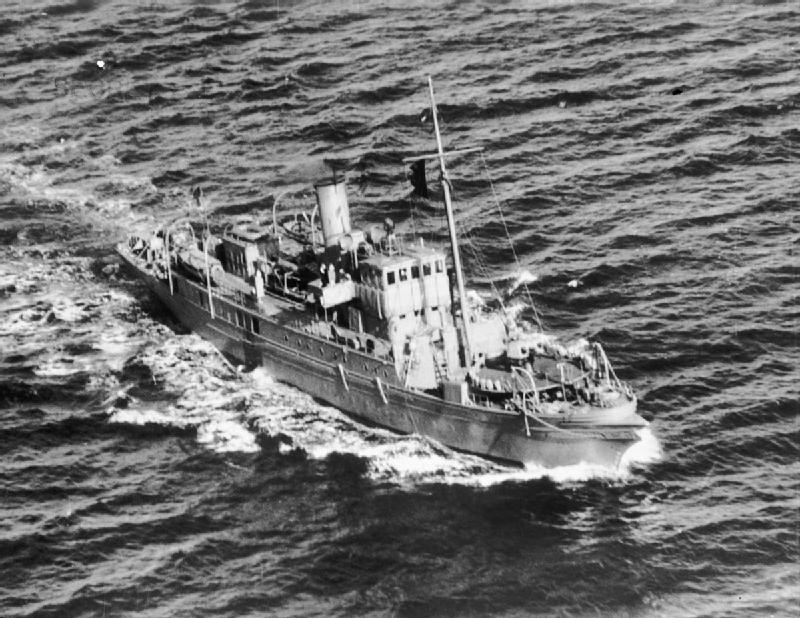
- HMS Tuscarora under way

History
- Name: 1897: Tuscarora; 1911: Goizeko-Izarra; 1922: Tuscarora; 1946: Anatoli; 1954: Evgenia; 1968: Alhelal
- Namesake: 1897: Tuscarora people; 1911: Basque for "Morning Star"; 1968: Arabic for "Crescent"
- Owner: 1897: William Clark; 1898: Mrs Elizabeth Laidlaw; 1902: Walter Jennings; 1907: Mrs OB Jennings; 1909: Executors of Mrs OB Jennings; 1911: Ramon de la Sota y Llano; 1922: Godfrey H Williams; 1924: Almeric Paget; 1929: William Gilchrist Macbeth; 1937: John Urquhart; 1940: Robert Reid Campbell; 1946: Ministry of Transport; 1946: Bienvenido SS Co Ltd; 1954: Domestinis SS Lines; 1959: Nicholas Moundreas & Co; 1961: Ar Georgacacos & Co
- Operator: 1940: (United Kingdom) Royal Navy; 1946: J Livanos & Sons
- Port of registry: 1897: (United Kingdom) Greenock; 1901: (United States) New York; 1911: (Spain) Bilbao; 1922: (United Kingdom) London; 1924: (United Kingdom) Southampton; 1936: (United Kingdom) Glasgow; 1946: Panama; 1954: (Greece) Piraeus; 1968: (Saudi Arabia)
- Builder: Scott & Co, Greenock
- Yard number: 347
- Launched: 17 June 1897
- Identification: UK official number 105584; 1898: code letters PVLS; 1922: code letters KQLH; 1934: call sign MLVJ; 1940: pennant number FY 044; 1958: call sign SXVX
- Fate: Sank, 4 October 1968

General characteristics
- Type: 1898: steam yacht; 1940: armed yacht; 1946: merchant ship
- Tonnage: 1898: 540 GRT, 304 NRT, 591 Thames Measurement; 1954: 466 GRT, 240 NRT
- Length: 1898: 181.4 ft (55.3 m) p/p; 1954: 175.5 ft (53.5 m) p/p; 1955: 200 ft 6 in (61.11 m) overall
- Beam: 26.8 ft (8.2 m)
- Depth: 14.55 ft (4.43 m)
- Decks: 1
- Installed power: 1897: 122 NHP
- Propulsion: 1897: 1 × triple-expansion engine; 1952: 1 × Diesel engine; 1 × screw
- Sail plan: 1897: 2-masted schooner
- Speed: 12 1/2 knots (23 km/h)

HMS Tuscarora was a steam yacht that was launched in Scotland in 1897 as Tuscarora. In 1911 she was renamed Goizeko-Izarra, and in 1922 her name was changed back to Tuscarora. In 1940 the Admiralty requisitioned her; had her converted into an anti-submarine training ship; and commissioned her as HMS Tuscarora (FY 044). She spent the war based at Campbeltown on the west coast of Scotland. In 1946 the Ministry of Transport sold her, and she was converted into a merchant ship. She was renamed Anatoli in 1946, Evgenia in 1952, and Alhelal in 1968. She sank in the Red Sea in 1968.

== Building ==
GL Watson designed the yacht; Scotts Shipbuilding and Engineering Company in Greenock built her as yard number 347; and she was launched on 17 June 1897. Her registered length was 181.4 ft (55.3 m), her beam was 26.8 ft (8.2 m) and her depth. Her tonnages were 540 GRT, 304 NRT, and 591 Thames Measurement. She had a single screw, driven by a three-cylinder triple-expansion engine that was rated at 122 NHP and gave her a speed of 12 1/2 knots (23 km/h). She also had two masts, and was rigged as a schooner.

== Private yacht ==
Tuscarora's first owner was a William Clark of Paisley, Renfrewshire. She was registered in Greenock. By 1898 her owner was a Mrs Elizabeth B Laidlaw of Largs. The yacht's UK official number was 105584, and her code letters were PVLS.

By 1902 the US industrialist Walter Jennings had acquired Tuscarora and she was registered in New York. By 1907 he had transferred the yacht to his mother, Mrs OB Jennings. By 1909 she had died, and Tuscarora was in the hands of her executors.

By 1911 the industrialist and Basque nationalist Ramon de la Sota y Llano had acquired Tuscarora, renamed her Goizeko-Izarra, and she was registered in Bilbao. "Goizeko-Izarra" is Basque for "Morning Star", a traditional name for the planet Venus. By 1920 de la Sota had acquired the larger yacht Warrior and renamed her Goizeko-Izarra as well.

In 1922 Godfrey H Williams of St Donat's Castle, Vale of Glamorgan acquired the yacht, reverted her name to Tuscarora, and she was registered in Southampton. By 1924 Almeric Paget, 1st Baron Queenborough had acquired her, and by 1925 her code letters were KQLH. By 1929 a William Gilchrist Macbeth, of Dunira, Perthshire, had acquired her.

By 1934 the call sign MLVJ had superseded Tuscarora's code letters, and by 1937 a John Urquhart of Glasgow had acquired her.

== Royal Navy training ship ==
By 1940 a Robert Reid Campbell of Glasgow had acquired her, but in January that year the Admiralty had requisitioned her for war use. She was converted into an anti-submarine training ship, commissioned as HMS Tuscarora, and given the pennant number FY 044.

By June 1940 Tuscarora was based at Campbeltown on Kintyre in Argyll. She operated from there until at least April 1945.

In the summer of 1940, training exercises involved a submarine making a practice attack on Tuscarora. From July 1940 other armed yachts, naval trawlers, and armed whalers started to be used in joint exercises with Tuscarora. From September they were described as "anti-submarine exercises" rather than a "practice attack".

The submarines most commonly used in exercises against Tuscarora were the H-class, which had been built for the First World War, and were now obsolescent. In the course of the Second World War HMS H28, H31, H32, H33, H34, H43, H44, and H50 all took part in exercises against her.

Other obsolescent First World War submarines took part in exercises against Tuscarora: the L-class HMS L23, and the United States R-class submarine USS R-3, which had been transferred to the Royal Navy as HMS P511. The 1920s Dutch O 9-class submarines HNLMS O 10 and O 9 also often took part. The 1920s prototype HMS Oberon was used a few times.

More modern Royal Navy submarines, usually deployed in front-line combat, occasionally took part in exercises against Tuscarora and other training ships. These included the Odin-class submarine HMS Otway; the S-class HMS Sealion; T-class HMS Templar and HMS Tuna; U-class HMS Ursula, HMS Upright, Umbra, Untiring, and Universal; and V-class HMS Vulpine.

== Merchant ship ==
In 1945 Tuscarora was decommissioned and returned to civilian ownership. In 1946 the Ministry of Transport sold her to the Bienvenido Steam Ship Co Ltd, who had her converted into a merchant ship, renamed her Anatoli. She was registered under the Panamanian flag of convenience, and managed by J Livanos and Sons. By 1954 Domestinis Steamship Lines had acquired her, renamed her Evgenia, and registered her in Piraeus, and an eight-cylinder Diesel engine had replaced her steam engine. Her registered length had been reduced to 175.5 ft (53.5 m), and her tonnages had been reduced to 466 GRT and 240 NRT. By 1958 her call sign was SXVX, and in 1958 or 1959 Nicolas Moundreas & Co acquired her. In 1961 Ar. Georgacacos & Co acquired her.

Until the Second World War, Lloyd's Register had always given Tuscarora its highest classification, "100A1". In August 1947, after she was renamed Anatoli, Lloyd's expunged this for "non-compliance with regulations". By 1959, after she was renamed Evgenia, she remained unclassified by Lloyd's.

By 1968 the yacht had been renamed Alhelal, which is Arabic for "Crescent". In October 1968 she left Port Sudan for Jeddah with a cargo of dura seed. In heavy weather she foundered in the Red Sea on 4 October, off the Sudanese coast at position 19°42′N 37°26′E.

== Bibliography ==
- Casualty Return (PDF). London: Lloyd's Register of Shipping. 1968.
- Lloyd's Register of Shipping. Vol. I. A–L. London: Lloyd's Register of Shipping. 1948 – via Internet Archive.
- Lloyd's Register of Shipping. Vol. I. A–L. London: Lloyd's Register of Shipping. 1954 – via Internet Archive.
- Lloyd's Register of Yachts. London: Lloyd's Register of British and Foreign Shipping. 1907 – via Internet Archive.
- Lloyd's Register of Yachts. London: Lloyd's Register of British and Foreign Shipping. 1909 – via Internet Archive.
- Lloyd's Register of Yachts. London: Lloyd's Register of British and Foreign Shipping. 1911 – via Internet Archive.
- Lloyd's Register of Yachts. London: Lloyd's Register of Shipping. 1920 – via Internet Archive.
- Lloyd's Register of Yachts. London: Lloyd's Register of Shipping. 1923 – via Internet Archive.
- Lloyd's Register of Yachts. London: Lloyd's Register of Shipping. 1924 – via Internet Archive.
- Lloyd's Register of Yachts. London: Lloyd's Register of Shipping. 1929 – via Internet Archive.
- Lloyd's Register of Yachts. London: Lloyd's Register of Shipping. 1934 – via Internet Archive.
- Lloyd's Register of Yachts. London: Lloyd's Register of Shipping. 1937 – via Internet Archive.
- Lloyd's Register of Yachts. London: Lloyd's Register of Shipping. 1939 – via Internet Archive.
- Mercantile Navy List. London. 1923 – via Crew List Index Project.
- Mercantile Navy List. London. 1925 – via Crew List Index Project.
- Mercantile Navy List. London. 1934 – via Crew List Index Project.
- Register Book. Vol. I Register of Ships. London: Lloyd's Register of Shipping. 1956 – via Internet Archive.
- Register Book. Vol. I Register of Ships. London: Lloyd's Register of Shipping. 1958 – via Internet Archive.
- Register Book. Vol. I Register of Ships. London: Lloyd's Register of Shipping. 1959 – via Internet Archive.
- Register of Yachts. London: Lloyd's Register of British and Foreign Shipping. 1897 – via Internet Archive.
- Register of Yachts. London: Lloyd's Register of British and Foreign Shipping. 1898 – via Internet Archive.
- Register of Yachts. London: Lloyd's Register of British and Foreign Shipping. 1902 – via Internet Archive.
