= USS Winchester =

Patrol vessel of the United States Navy

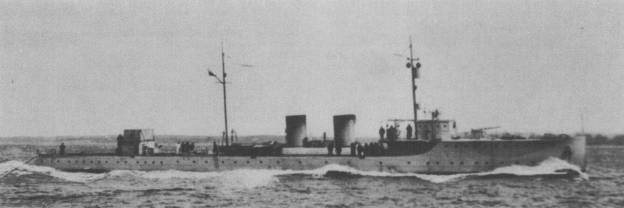
- USS Winchester

History

United States
- Name: USS Winchester
- Namesake: Previous name retained
- Builder: Bath Iron Works, Bath, Maine
- Completed: 1916
- Acquired: 30 May 1917
- Commissioned: 4 September 1917
- Decommissioned: 19 December 1919
- Fate: Sold 24 March 1921
- Notes: Operated as private yacht SS Winchester 1916–1917 and SS Winchester and SS Renard 1921–1940

Canada
- Name: Renard
- Namesake: Renard, the French word for "fox" (previous name retained)
- Commissioned: 27 May 1940
- Decommissioned: 1 August 1944
- Identification: Pennant number: S13/Z13
- Fate: Sold to private interests 1944

General characteristics
- Type: Patrol vessel
- Tonnage: 399 GRT
- Length: 225 ft (68.6 m)
- Beam: 21 ft (6.4 m)
- Draft: 5 ft 6 in (1.7 m) (aft)
- Installed power: 15,000 hp (11,000 kW)
- Propulsion: Two 7,500 hp (5,600 kW) geared Parsons steam turbines, two shafts
- Speed: 32 knots (59 km/h; 37 mph)
- Armament: 1 × 3 in (76 mm) gun; 1 × 6-pounder gun; 2 × machine guns; 1 × "Y gun" depth charge projector; With Royal Canadian Navy: 1 × 12-pounder gun; 2 × 21-inch (533 mm) torpedo tubes

USS Winchester (SP-156) was an armed yacht that served in the United States Navy as a patrol vessel from 1917 to 1919. Prior to and following World War I, Winchester was a private yacht, later renamed Renard. In World War II, Renard was requisitioned for use in the Royal Canadian Navy as a patrol vessel, keeping her name. She was returned to her owners in 1944.

== Description ==
Winchester had a tonnage of 399 gross register tons (GRT). The yacht was 225 feet (68.6 m) long with a beam of 21 ft (6.4 m) and a draft of 5 ft 6 in (1.7 m). The ship was propelled by two geared Parsons steam turbines driving two shafts powered by two watertube boilers creating 15,000 horsepower (11,000 kW). This gave the ship a maximum speed of 32 knots (59 km/h; 37 mph).

== Construction and career ==
SS Winchester was built as a fast, steel-hulled, steam-powered, destroyer-like civilian yacht in 1916 by Bath Iron Works at Bath, Maine. The ship was ordered for construction by the millionaire Peter W. Rouss. The yacht was launched on 29 April 1916. Winchester was considered a "floating palace" during her career in the 1920s. The U.S. Navy acquired the yacht from her owner on 30 May 1917 for use as a patrol vessel during World War I.

=== United States Navy service, 1917–1919 ===
After her acquisition, the yacht was commissioned on 4 September 1917 as USS Winchester (SP-156). Winchester initially was assigned to section patrol duty in the 2d Naval District in southern New England, patrolling the coast between Chatham, Massachusetts and New London, Connecticut. In January 1918, the vessel was reassigned to the 5th Naval District and operated in the Norfolk-Hampton Roads area of Virginia, where she was assigned to special duty with the U.S. Navy Bureau of Construction and Repair to test minesweeping equipment. Late in December 1918, Winchester deployed to City Island in the Bronx, New York, where she continued her minesweeping testing duties. On 13 April 1919, she returned to the 5th Naval District, operating out of Yorktown, Virginia, continuing to test minesweeping gear. Winchester was decommissioned at Norfolk on 19 December 1919. After several attempts, she was finally sold to Cox and Stevens of New York City on 24 March 1921.

=== Civilian career, 1921–1940 ===
Winchester resumed civilian service as a yacht with Cox and Stevens. The ship was sold several times, first to Vincent Astor who rebuilt the yacht in 1930. The vessel was finished with teak, ivory and walnut. The owner's quarters, located aft, comprised a lounge, two double staterooms, four single staterooms and four baths. Forward was the dining room and crew quarters. The yacht was sold to Russell A. Alger Jr., and then to Cornelius Vanderbilt III. Winchester was later sold to B. P. McCurdy, this latter time being rechristened SS Renard.

=== Royal Canadian Navy and fate ===
After failing to acquire any British vessels at the outset of World War II for auxiliary purposes, the Royal Canadian Navy discreetly searched the American market for suitable ships. However, American law prevented the sale of ships for possible use in the war to any of the belligerents. The Royal Canadian Navy requisitioned unsuitable Canadian yachts and had their respective owners go to the United States and buy those ships the navy wanted as replacements. Once the ships arrived in Canada, the navy then returned the original yachts and requisitioned the new ones. Renard was among those vessels chosen and was acquired in 1940.

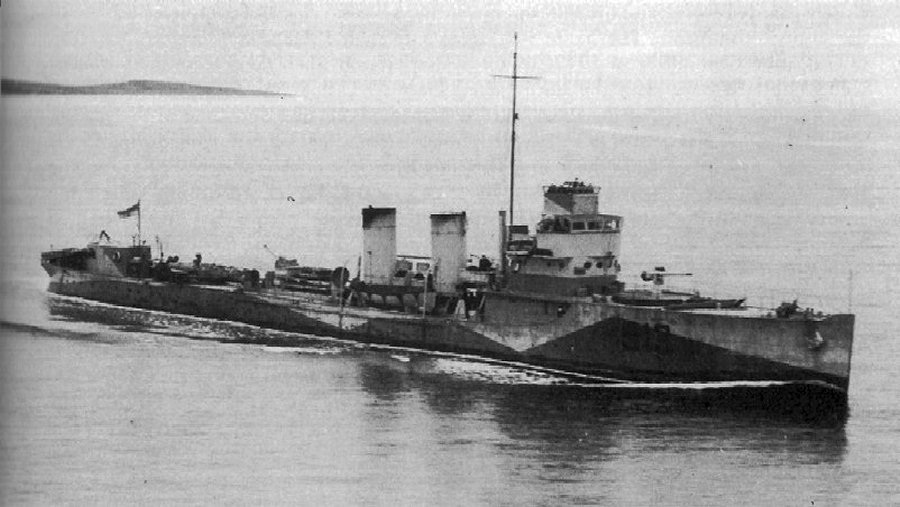
HMCS Renard underway off Halifax during World War II

Renard was brought to Halifax, Nova Scotia and commissioned there on 27 May 1940 with the pennant number S13, which was later altered to Z13, keeping her name. The vessel then went to Quebec City, Quebec where she was converted into an armed yacht, having a 12-pounder naval gun placed forward, an ASDIC set installed and armed with depth charges. This took until December 1940, when the ship returned to Halifax and was assigned to the Halifax Local Defence Force. In 1941, Renard was tender to HMCS Stadacona and in 1942 was fitted with high-speed target towing gear.

Renard remained with this unit until April 1942 when the ship was taken in hand for a refit, this lasting until July. Upon completion, she was attached to HMCS Cornwallis as a torpedo training ship and two 21-inch (533 mm) torpedo tubes were installed aft. In July 1943 the training group moved to Digby, Nova Scotia. However, by November Renard was back at Halifax. In 1944, Renard was surveyed and was found not worth repairing and was paid off on 1 August. The vessel was put up for disposal on 15 November 1945 and sold to W.N. MacDonald of Sydney, Nova Scotia.

The ship remained at Sydney until 1949, when the yacht was converted to a stationary power plant for a mining development near Mabou, Nova Scotia. Renard's turbines were stripped out and replaced with modern generators and her oil burning units were replaced with pulverized coal burning equipment. The ship was derelict at Sydney, Nova Scotia in 1955.
