= HMS Reindeer =

Four ships of the Royal Navy have borne the name HMS Reindeer or Rein Deer, after the Reindeer:

- HMS Reindeer (1804) was an 18-gun Cruizer-class brig-sloop, launched in 1804, captured by USS Wasp in 1814, and subsequently burnt.
- HMS Reindeer (1829) was an 8-gun packet brig launched in 1829, on harbour service from 1841 and sold in 1847. Despite this, she remained on the Navy lists until 1856.
- HMS Reindeer (1866) was a Camelion-class wood screw sloop launched in 1866. Work had been suspended in 1865 but was subsequently restarted. She was broken up in 1876.
- HMS Reindeer (1883) was a Mariner-class screw sloop launched in 1883. She was used as a boom defence vessel from 1904, and a salvage vessel from 1917. She was sold in 1929.

There was also a requisitioned trawler launched in 1902 and named Reindeer.

== See also ==
- HMCS Reindeer, an armed yacht that served in the Battle of the Atlantic and the Battle of the St. Lawrence.
