= USS Venetia =

Patrol vessel of the United States Navy

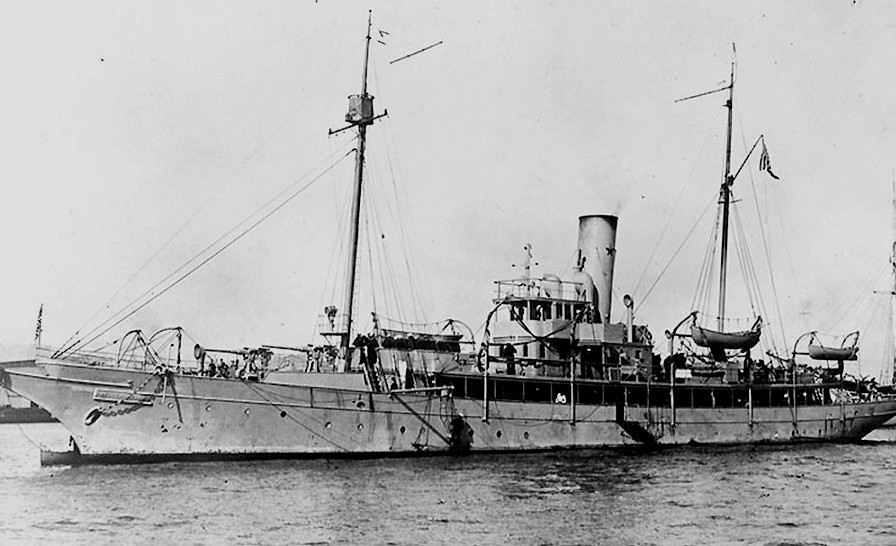
- USS Venetia (SP-431) photograph dated 26 February 1919, upon her return to San Francisco, California, following World War I service.

History

United States
- Name: USS Venetia
- Namesake: Name retained by the Navy
- Owner: built for F. W. Sykes of Green Lea, Yorkshire, Great Britain; sold in 1905 to Morton F. Plant of New York, New York; sold in 1908 to Jesse Livermore of New York; sold in 1909 to G.W. Elkins of Elkins Park, Pennsylvania; sold in 1911 to John Diedrich Spreckles of San Francisco, California.
- Builder: Hawthorne and Co., Ltd., Leith, Scotland based on plans provided by the designers Cox and King
- Laid down: date unknown
- Christened: as the yacht Venetia
- Completed: 1904 at Leith, Scotland
- Acquired: leased by the Navy 4 August 1917 from John Diedrich Spreckles
- Commissioned: 15 October 1917 at the Mare Island Navy Yard, Vallejo, California
- Decommissioned: 27 February 1919 at Mare Island
- Stricken: 1919
- Honours and awards: Awarded "star of reward" for her antisubmarine activities during World War I. At the time she was credited with sinking three German U-boats.
- Fate: Returned to her owner 4 April 1919; scrapped in 1968
- Notes: Venetia received commendations from the British Senior Naval Officer, Gibraltar; from Commander in Chief, Mediterranean; and from the American Patrol Force commander, Rear Admiral Wilson.

General characteristics
- Type: Yacht
- Tonnage: 589 tons
- Length: 226 ft (69 m)
- Beam: 27 ft (8.2 m)
- Draft: 15 ft (4.6 m)
- Propulsion: steam engine
- Speed: 13 knots (24 km/h)
- Complement: 69
- Armament: Four 3-inch (76 mm) guns; Two AA machine guns; depth charge rack and releasing gear

USS Venetia (SP-431) was a large 589 gross ton steam yacht leased by the U.S. Navy during World War I. She was heavily armed with four 3-inch (76 mm) guns and depth charges, and was assigned duties of a patrol craft, escorting ships in convoy on the North Atlantic Ocean, and protecting those ships from German submarine attack. Venetia was awarded a "star of reward" for her antisubmarine work, and mounted the star on her stack. Post-war she was restored to her original civilian configuration, and was returned to her owner.

== A yacht built in Scotland ==
Venetia—a single-screw, steel-hulled steam yacht built in 1904 at Leith, Scotland, by Hawthorne and Company to plans drawn up by the designers Cox and King—was acquired by the U.S. Navy on 4 August 1917 from California industrialist John D. Spreckels for use as a patrol craft. Designated SP-431 and fitted out at the Mare Island Navy Yard, Vallejo, California, Venetia was commissioned at Mare Island on 15 October 1917, Comdr. Lewis B. Porterfield in command.

== World War I service ==
=== Transit to the Atlantic Ocean ===
The converted yacht departed Mare Island on 23 October, transited the Panama Canal on 6 November, and reached Philadelphia, Pennsylvania, on 15 November. The ship underwent alterations at the Philadelphia Navy Yard—including the installation of new radio equipment—before she sailed for New York City on 3 December. Following minor repairs at the New York Navy Yard from 4 to 15 December, Venetia returned to Philadelphia.

=== First transatlantic passage ===
Four days before Christmas, Venetia sailed for European waters with SC-67 (allocated to the French Navy) in tow and in company with the converted yacht Lydonia which, in turn, had the French SC-173 in tow. The next day, they rendezvoused with Montauk, Gypsum Queen, and Barnegat off the Delaware Bay breakwater and headed for Bermuda where they arrived on the 26th and remained into the new year, 1918.

The group got underway on the next leg of the transatlantic passage on 7 January and reached the Azores on the 23d. Venetia subsequently spent five days at sea, searching for a French subchaser (SC-319) which had been separated from the convoy. The yacht eventually departed Ponta Delgada on 8 February in company with Nahant and Penobscot—each ship towing a French subchaser. Arriving at Port Leixos, Portugal, on the 13th, Venetia got underway again five days later, with the French SC-172 in tow, and arrived at Gibraltar on the 18th.

While undergoing voyage repairs, Venetia received a new depth charge rack and releasing gear. Thus outfitted, Venetia sailed on 2 March 1918 in the screen for a 28-ship convoy, bound for Bizerte, Tunisia. Other escorts sharing the mission included Cythera, Artemis, and the French trawler Isole. Six days later, Venetia got underway back toward Gibraltar, escorting eight vessels, and returned to her home port on 12 March. Based at Gibraltar, the ship performed similar convoy escort missions in the Mediterranean for the duration of hostilities.

=== Attacking German submarine UB-52 ===
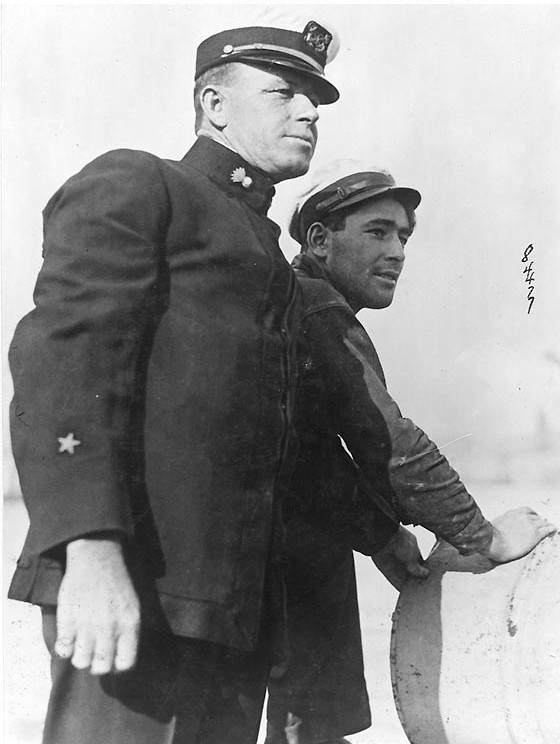
Gunner Illinus D. Jacobus, USN Standing by a depth charge on board USS Venetia at San Francisco, California, 26 February 1919. Note the flaming bombshell insignia on his collar. He is accompanied by a Chief Petty Officer.

Her first contact with the enemy came that spring. On 11 May 1918, Venetia was steaming off the port quarter of a 7-knot (13 km/h) convoy bound for Gibraltar, when a torpedo streaked past her bow, some 150 to 200 yards (180 m) ahead. Lookouts on the armed yacht then sighted "a large amount of water" spouting into the air over the bow of SS Susette Fraisinette, a French steamship about 100 yards (91 m) away. The merchantman had been torpedoed by UB-52 and later sank at 0412. While the French trawler Isole picked up 34 survivors from Susette Fraisinette, Venetia cruised in widening circles until 0520, carrying out a sector search for the offending U-boat. At 0527, the yacht's maintop lookout sighted UB-52 eight or nine miles (13 or 14 km) away, standing well off the convoy's track and on a course between west and southwest.

Venetia, at general quarters, headed for UB-52 at full speed, keeping the submarine bearing one point to starboard, at intervals, as the submarine continued standing off to westward. Soon, the yacht gained perceptibility, and the U-boat came into better view. Her periscopes were down, and lookouts in the yacht noted that the enemy submersible mounted a single gun (a 3.4-inch (86 mm) weapon) forward of the small conning tower. The fact that the German's bow seemed "unusually high" out of the water—coupled with the fact that there was "no perceptible bow-wave"—led Comdr. Porterfield to hope that either the enemy's diving apparatus was disabled "... or that he decided to shoot it out."

As Venetia bore down on UB-52, Porterfield laid out his battle plan: keep the U-boat one point on the starboard bow, open up with 3-inch (76 mm) gunfire at about 6,500 yards (5,900 m), machine guns at 2,000, "and finish by ramming him at full speed." Unfortunately, the U-boat's commander, Oberleutnant zur See Launburg, saw Venetia's approach and ordered his ship to dive. Porter-field took Venetia over where the U-boat had just "pulled the plug" and initiated a search. Venetia steamed in the vicinity, within a five-mile (8 km) circle, probing until 0738. During that time, she dropped 13 depth bombs and subsequently set a course to keep the enemy from making further attacks on the convoy.

Twelve days later, UB-52 met her doom in the Adriatic at the hands of the British submarine HMS H-4. Survivors from the U-boat reported that Venetia's efforts had not only prevented further attacks on the convoy but had driven UB-52 off. Since Porterfield's action in doggedly pursuing the U-boat had aided substantially in saving the convoy, he received commendations from the British Senior Naval Officer, Gibraltar; from Commander in Chief, Mediterranean; and from the American Patrol Force commander, Rear Admiral Wilson.

=== Attacking German submarine UB-39 ===
Back at sea with a convoy outward bound from Gibraltar soon thereafter, Venetia's next encounter with the enemy came within a week of her brush with UB-52. Just before nightfall on 17 May, the armed yacht was steaming on an irregular zig-zag pattern when the British steamship SS Sculptor took a torpedo from UB-39. Venetia, two and one-half to three points abaft the beam of the stricken merchantman and 1,300 yards (1,200 m) away, simultaneously sounded general quarters and rang down emergency full speed ahead.

As the yacht passed astern of Sculptor, Porterfield assumed that, after making her attack, the submarine had turned aft on the starboard side of the convoy. Venetia consequently dropped 300-pound depth charges set at 150-foot (46 m) depth, between 1901 and 1902. At that point, the yacht's foretop lookout reported that he could see the wake of a submarine moving through the water. Ensign Willis L. DeCamp took station in the foretop and confirmed the lookout's report.

Venetia altered course and dropped depth charges ahead of the wake at 1906, 1908, 1909, 1911, and 1913. Meanwhile, Surveyor stood by the damaged merchantman, and Venetia radioed Oran to send a tug. USS Wheeling (Gunboat No. 14) assisted in the attack, dropping seven depth charges; Venetia subsequently stood by Sculptor with orders to get her underway, if possible, in tow, and circled the crippled ship at 12 knots (22 km/h). By this time, British trawler Corvi, French trawler Isole, and French subchasers SC-171 and SC-350 picked up survivors and were standing by. Venetia then ordered Isole to rejoin the convoy.

However, the escorts were not nearly as successful driving away the attacker this time. Twice more, U-39 closed the convoy, sinking British steamer SS Mavisbrook at 2028 and then damaging SS Elswick Grange at 2320. The latter eventually reached port under tow.

=== Searching for another attacking U-boat ===
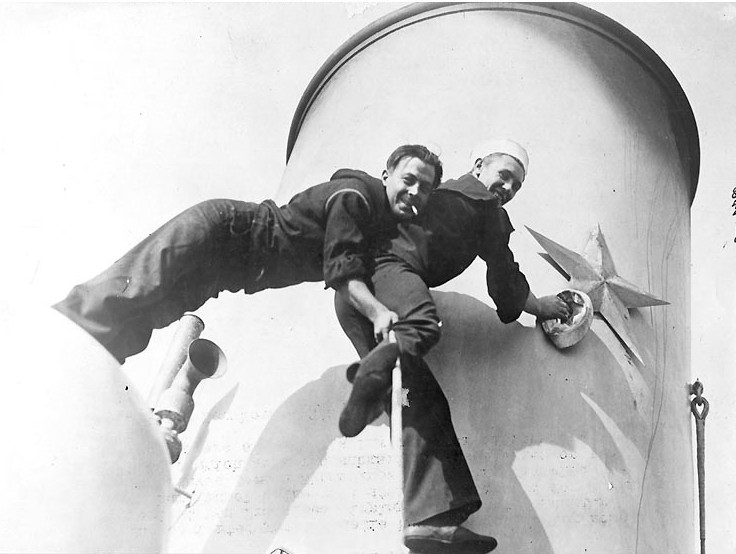
Polishing the star awarded to her for her antisubmarine work.

Venetia's next encounter with the enemy came less than two months later. On 20 July, the warship departed Gibraltar, bound for Genoa, Italy, as part of the screen for a convoy of 17 ships. Her fellow escorts were British trawler Kodama, British sloop Narcissus, Italian trawler Porto Torres, and American converted yacht Wenonah.

Three days into the voyage, an enemy submarine, lurking nearby, torpedoed the British merchantman SS Messidor at 1924. At that time, Venetia was steaming at 11 knots (20 km/h) some 800 yards (730 m) astern and was zigzagging to starboard of the convoy. Hearing the explosion, Venetia went to full speed and headed toward the front of the convoy. Between 1926 and 2000, she searched for the U-boat and dropped two British and 11 American depth charges. During that time, the ship once sighted a suspicious wake on the starboard bow. Venetia came hard right but, upon investigation, decided that the wake had not been made by either a submarine or a torpedo.

While the yacht continued searching for the submarine, she kept within sight of the sinking Messidor which her crewmen could see plainly in the moonlight. At 2025, the patrol craft passed within hailing distance of Kodama which was busy picking up survivors, asking for a count on the survivors and the missing. Kodama replied that she had not finished counting; after telling the trawler to steam in a circle and continue counting until totals had been reached, Venetia continued the search for the U-boat.

Venetia neared Kodama again shortly under an hour later, and ascertained the count of survivors to be 33, with one man missing. Porterfield—not at all certain that Messidor would sink—wondered if he should not retain Messidor's officers to accompany the steamer to port in case she could be towed in. He prepared a wireless message to Algiers asking for a tug and escort to either Algiers or Bougie, and stating that he would stand by Messidor until 0500 the next morning. However, all of his speculations were soon rendered academic, as Messidor began listing rapidly to starboard at 2230. Ten minutes later, the freighter rolled over and sank. Venetia then headed northward to catch up with the convoy and joined at 0746 on 24 July; two days later, the convoy arrived at Genoa without further incident.

=== Continued convoy escort duty ===
Venetia returned to Gibraltar with a 20-ship convoy on 1 August after an uneventful passage. The next day, Comdr. Porterfield was relieved by Capt. C. F. Howell, USCG, as commanding officer. On the 16th of that month, the armed yacht began a refit and overhaul at Gibraltar, entering drydock on the 26th for hull repairs. Venetia put to sea on 14 September with an 11-ship convoy and arrived at Genoa six days later. She returned to her home base on 26 September, convoying 19 ships safely to port.

Venetia subsequently conducted two more round-trip convoy escort voyages—one to Genoa and one to Bizerte—before she departed Gibraltar on 6 November, bound for Madeira, in company with Surveyor. The ships arrived at Funchal, Madeira, on the 9th, and Venetia departed on the 11th, the day that the armistice was signed at Compiègne, France, ending World War I. The armed yacht made arrival at Ponta Delgada, in the Azores, on the 13th, en route to Gibraltar, which she reached on the 19th.

== Post-war operations ==
During her last month in European waters, Venetia made a round-trip voyage to Portugal before sailing for the United States on 21 December, towing SC-223, as part of a homeward-bound subchaser detachment built around the tender Hannibal. Later towing SC-330, the yacht reached Ponta Delgada on the day after Christmas. Subsequently, touching at St. Thomas, Virgin Islands; Santo Domingo, Dominican Republic; and Port-au-Prince, Haiti, Venetia arrived at Guantanamo Bay on 31 January 1919.

== Post-war disposition ==
She transited the Panama Canal on 3 February and reached San Francisco on the 20th. One week later, on 27 February 1919, Venetia shifted to the Mare Island Navy Yard where she was decommissioned, and all of her military fittings were removed. She was returned to her owner on 4 April 1919.

== Continued maritime service ==
Venetia remained under the ownership of the entrepreneur John D. Spreckles until his death in June 1926. The graceful yacht was then sold to James Playfair, of Midland, Ontario, who owned the ship from 1928 to 1939. The ownership of the erstwhile convoy escort and patrol craft changed hands again in 1940, when R. S. Misener acquired the ship. After some 65 years in operation—the latter years on the Great Lakes—she disappeared from the Lloyd's Register of Yachts in 1968.
