= HMCS Husky =

Armed yacht used by the Royal Canadian Navy

History
- Name: Wild Duck; Xania II; Good Neighbor; Aquarius No. 2
- Port of registry: United States; Honduras
- Ordered: 1930
- Builder: Defoe Boat & Engine Works, Bay City, Michigan
- Launched: 1930
- In service: 1930
- Out of service: 1979
- Fate: Converted to floating restaurant

Canada
- Name: Husky
- Acquired: 1940
- Commissioned: 23 July 1940
- Decommissioned: 4 August 1945
- Fate: Sold for commercial service

General characteristics as armed yacht
- Type: Armed yacht
- Displacement: 360 long tons (370 t)
- Length: 153 ft (46.6 m)
- Beam: 25 ft (7.6 m)
- Draught: 10 ft (3.0 m)
- Speed: 10 knots (19 km/h; 12 mph)
- Complement: 40
- Sensors & processing systems: Asdic
- Armament: 1 × QF 4-inch (102 mm) gun; 20 depth charges and two depth charge throwers

HMCS Husky was an armed yacht used for patrol and training purposes during World War II by the Royal Canadian Navy. The ship was constructed as the yacht Wild Duck in 1930 in Bay City, Michigan. Having several owners through the 1930s, the vessel was renamed Xania II. Acquired by the Royal Canadian Navy in 1940 for patrol, escort and training duties in Atlantic Canada, the ship was taken out of service at the end of the war and sold into commercial service. The vessel was purchased by the Port of New Orleans, Louisiana for use as an inspection ship. In 1967 the ship was sold again, renamed Aquarius No. 2 and used as a diving tender based in Honduras. In 1979 the vessel was acquired by American interests who brought the ship back to New Orleans and converted it to a floating restaurant.

== Description and private service ==
Ordered by Charles Fisher in 1930 from Defore Boat Company of Bay City, Michigan, the yacht was named Wild Duck. Construction of the vessel cost $210,934.31. The yacht had a gross register tonnage of 245.36 tons. The ship measured 153 ft (46.6 m) long with a beam of 25 ft (7.6 m) and a draught of 10 ft (3.0 m). The vessel had a maximum speed of 10 knots (19 km/h; 12 mph). The yacht had several owners during the 1930s, with its name being changed to Xania II.

== Canadian service ==
To augment the local sea defences of East Coast ports, the Royal Canadian Navy sought large, steel-hulled yachts to requisition. However, a significant lack of capable vessels were owned by Canadians. Canada turned to its southern neighbour for suitable ships, finding several in the United States that met the navy's requirements. However, US neutrality laws prevented their sale to belligerents in the war. In order to circumvent these laws, the Royal Canadian Navy requisitioned the yachts of prominent Canadian yachtsmen and then sent them to the US to purchase the yachts that had been identified by the navy without the US government knowing they were working for the navy. The money to acquire the vessels was provided by the Canadian government through bank loans.

In 1940, Xania II was requisitioned from her owner, George Herrick Duggan, by the Royal Canadian Navy for $1. Following her acquisition, Xania II was converted into an armed yacht, departing Halifax, Nova Scotia on 30 May 1940 for Quebec City, Quebec. Conversion to an armed yacht involved removing most of the luxurious finery and installing naval hardware. This involved the installation of a QF 4-inch (102 mm) gun, one machine gun, sonar and twenty depth charges and two depth charge throwers. The ship had a displacement of 360 long tons (370 t) and a complement of five officers and 35 ratings. Renamed Husky and commissioned at Halifax on 23 July, the yacht began local patrols off Halifax the same day.

The yacht was assigned to the anti-submarine defence of Sydney, Nova Scotia in August 1940. There in September Husky escorted SC convoys from Sydney until they merged with other groups at sea for the Atlantic crossing. Alongside HMCS Elk, the two armed yachts were the only escorts for the convoys leaving the port due to a severe lack of capable ships.

In January 1941, Husky was deployed to the Caribbean Sea for several months. There the yacht intercepted two neutral-flagged tankers whose countries had been overrun by Nazi Germany during the war. The tankers were released after reflagging themselves with the British flag. The ship returned to Canada on 24 September 1941 and joined the Saint John Force, based at Saint John, New Brunswick. In November 1941, Husky became an examination vessel at Halifax. While alongside in Halifax, outboard of a Dutch training submarine, the destroyer HMCS Hamilton surged backwards erroneously and rammed between the two ships. Husky received minor damage, but the destroyer punched a hole in the submarine's hull, causing it to sink. The vessel was reassigned to Saint John and from March 1942 until October 1942, the armed yacht and HMCS Caribou were the only seaward defence for the port. During the summer months of 1942, Husky escorted local convoys from Saint John, New Brunswick before becoming an examination vessel at Saint John. In March 1943, Husky became a training ship in the Bay of Fundy, attached to HMCS Cornwallis, a role she remained in until the end of the war. Additionally, the armed yachts stationed at Cornwallis would escort the ferry Princess Helen on run between Saint John and Digby, Nova Scotia after the sinking of SS Caribou.

== Post war service ==
The armed yacht was declared surplus on 7 June 1945 and taken to Sydney, Nova Scotia for disposal. The ship was officially paid off on 4 August. (Note: Macpherson & Barrie have the date as 3 August.) Husky was sold along with fellow armed yachts HMCS Reindeer and HMCS Caribou to the Margaree Steamships Company on 28 August 1945. Margaree Steamships flipped the ship to the Port of New Orleans in 1946 to be used as an inspection ship. The ship was initially renamed Wild Duck before taking on the name Good Neighbor. Good Neighbor was given two new 450 hp (340 kW) diesel engines and the paneling was re-installed and the ship was painted blue, white and buff. While in service as the city's inspection vessel, a number of celebrities visited the ship including Charles de Gaulle, and the King and Queen of Greece.

In February 1967, the ship was acquired by the W.S. Young Construction Company, but the company failed and the ship was taken over by the U.S. Marshals and sold to Twinkling Star Inc. Keeping the name Good Neighbor, the vessel was used as a cruise yacht before being sold to Vernon Allen for use as a diving tender based in Honduras. Renamed Aquarius No. 2, the vessel was used off the Louisiana and Texan coasts. In 1979, the ship was sold again due to increasing maintenance problems and returned to New Orleans where the vessel was gutted to become a floating restaurant.
