= Brewster Jennings =

American oilman (1898–1968)

- Born: June 9, 1898; New York City, New York
- Died: October 2, 1968 (aged 70); Roosevelt Hospital, New York City
- Education: St. Paul's School
- Alma mater: Yale University
- Spouse: Kate deForest Prentice (m. 1923)
- Parent(s): Oliver Gould Jennings; Mary Dows Brewster

Benjamin Brewster Jennings (June 9, 1898 – October 2, 1968) was an American business executive, president of the Socony-Vacuum company, which became, in 1955, the Standard Oil Company of New York (Socony), which would later become Mobil Oil, and then merge to become part of ExxonMobil.

== Early life ==
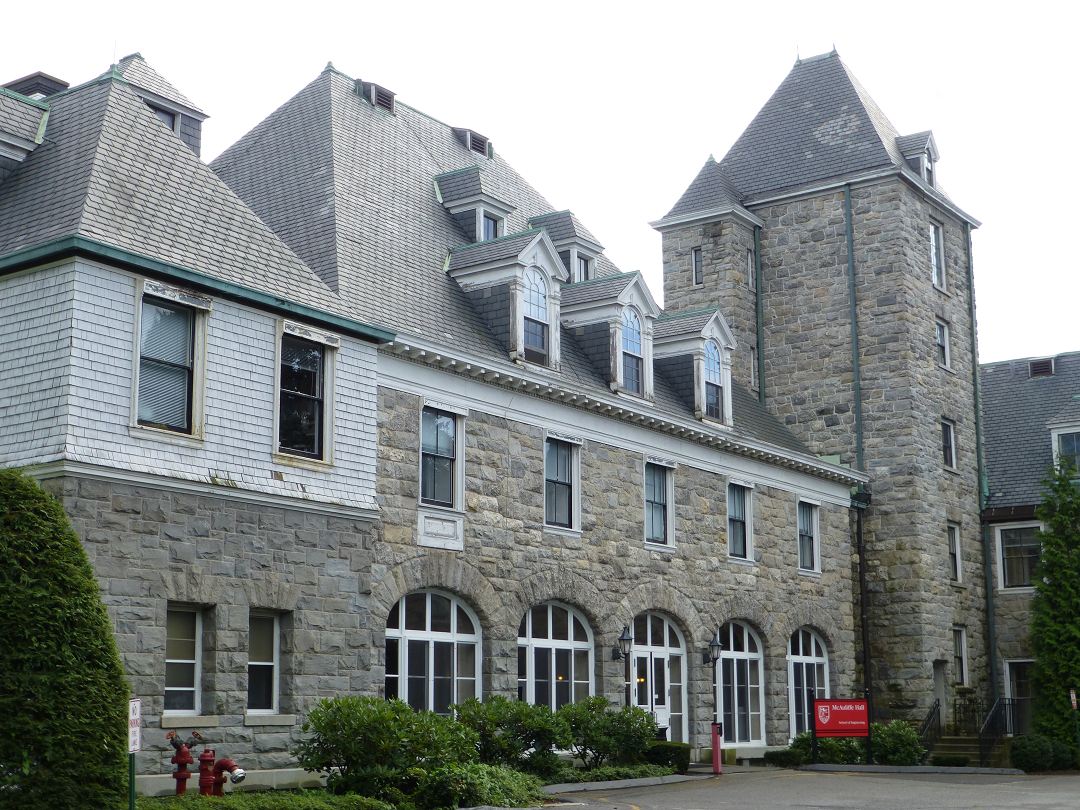
Mailands

B. B. Jennings was born to Oliver Gould Jennings (1865-1936) and Mary Dows Brewster in New York City. Both his paternal grandfather, Oliver Burr Jennings (1825–1893), and his maternal grandfather, Benjamin Brewster (1828–1897) after whom he was named, were involved with Standard Oil co-founder John Davison Rockefeller and had become his partners in running the Standard Oil Trust. Both men had gone west in the California Gold Rush and had set up a successful dry goods merchandise business, outfitting prospecting camps along the coast and around Sacramento. Through his paternal grandmother, Esther Judson Goodsell, B. B. Jennings was a grandnephew of Almira Geraldine Goodsell Rockefeller, whose husband was Standard Oil co-founder William Avery Rockefeller Jr.

Jennings was raised in Fairfield, Connecticut, where his father had built a forty-room French Renaissance style home called the Mailands. The building later became part of the campus of Fairfield University and was renamed McAuliffe Hall. He attended St. Paul's School in Concord, New Hampshire. During World War I he served in the United States Navy as an ensign on a submarine chaser and was awarded the Navy Cross.

In 1920, he graduated from Yale University, where he was tapped for the secret society Scroll and Key. He continued his involvement with Yale as an alumnus, serving as a member of the Yale Corporation Council and as chairman of the Yale Development Committee.

== Career ==
After his graduation from Yale in 1920, Jennings began his career as a clerk in the marine department of the Standard Oil Company of New York (Socony). He became a purchasing agent, then manager of the company's real estate department, and then assistant to the president. In 1939, eight years after Socony merged with Vacuum Oil to form Socony-Vacuum, he was appointed to the board of directors and put in charge of transportation.

In 1942, Jennings left the company to become assistant director of tanker operations in the United States Maritime Commission and then assistant deputy administrator for tanker operations of the War Shipping Administration. He was awarded the presidential certificate of merit for outstanding contributions to the war effort.

He was also one of the first recipients of the Navy's Distinguished Public Service Award in October 1952, honored for his World War II services in the War Shipping Administration.

After the end of the war he returned to the company and was named president and chairman of the executive committee. In 1955 he became chairman of the board and continued as chairman of the executive committee. Also in 1955, the company changed its name to Socony Mobil (renamed Mobil Oil Corporation in 1966). During his tenure as chief executive officer the company experienced rapid expansion, tripling its worldwide gross crude production.

Jennings was vice president in charge of the transportation division of the American Petroleum Institute in 1947–1948 and its treasurer in 1949–1950. He was also a trustee of the Sloan-Kettering Institute for Cancer Research and the Avalon Foundation.

Jennings continued as chief executive officer of Socony Mobil until his retirement in 1958.

== Personal life ==
On June 18, 1923, Jennings married Kate deForest Prentice (1903–1994), daughter of John Hill Prentice and Kate Sheldon Harrison. They had three children:

- Mary Brewster Jennings (1924–1995), who married Yale law graduate Paul Jerome Chase, son of Dr. Oscar J. Chase of Scarsdale, New York, in 1947.
- Kate deForest Jennings (1927–2002), who married Harry Havemeyer Webb, a son of James Watson Webb II and Electra Havemeyer Webb, in 1947.
- John Prentice Jennings (1929–2011), who married Mary Ann Kelly, daughter of Albert C. Kelly of Nassau, in 1955.

In 1968, Jennings died at Roosevelt Hospital in New York City after a short illness. He was 70 years old and lived in Glen Head, New York.

== See also ==
- ExxonMobil
- Mobil
