= USS Porterfield =

Fletcher-class destroyer

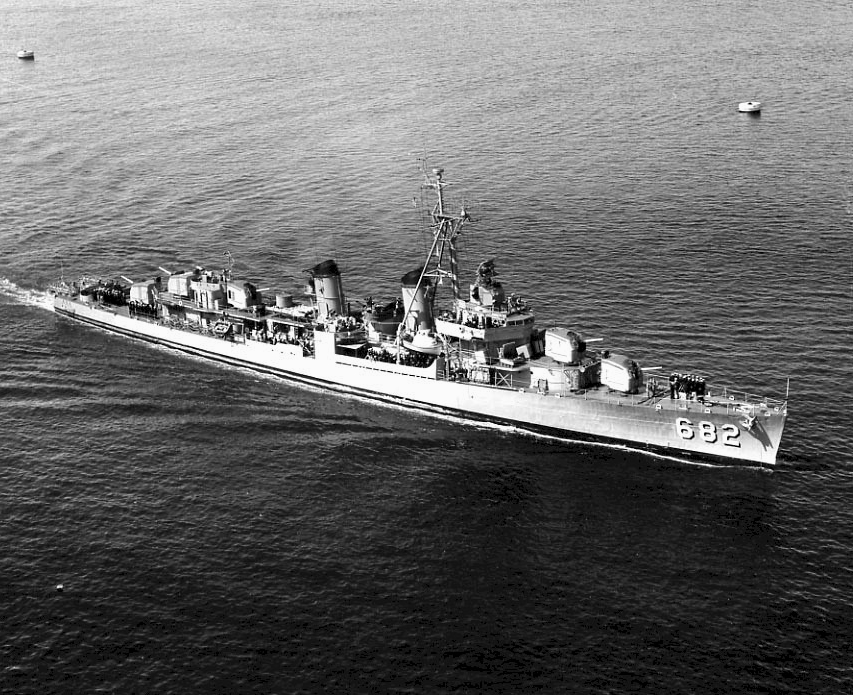
- USS Porterfield (DD-682) in the early 1950s

History

United States
- Name: USS Porterfield
- Namesake: Lewis B. Porterfield
- Builder: Bethlehem Shipbuilding, San Pedro, California
- Laid down: 12 December 1942
- Launched: 13 June 1943
- Commissioned: 30 October 1943
- Decommissioned: 7 November 1969
- Stricken: 1 March 1975
- Fate: Sunk as a target, 18 July 1982

General characteristics
- Class & type: Fletcher-class destroyer
- Displacement: 2,050 tons
- Length: 376 ft 5 in (114.73 m)
- Beam: 39 ft 7 in (12.07 m)
- Draft: 17 ft 9 in (5.41 m)
- Propulsion: 60,000 shp (45,000 kW); geared turbines; 2 propellers
- Speed: 38 knots (70 km/h; 44 mph)
- Range: 6,500 nmi (12,000 km; 7,500 mi) at 15 knots (28 km/h; 17 mph)
- Complement: 329
- Armament: 5 × 5 in (127 mm) DP guns, 10 × 40 mm AA guns, 7 × 20 mm AA guns, 10 × 21 in (53 cm) torpedo tubes, 6 × depth charge projectors, 2 × depth charge tracks

USS Porterfield (DD-682) was a Fletcher-class destroyer of the United States Navy. Commissioned in 1943, she served in several Pacific campaigns during World War II, earning ten battle stars. She was decommissioned immediately after the end of the war but reactivated in 1951 for the Korean War, earning four more battle stars, and then served continuously until 1969. She was sunk as a target in 1982.

== Construction and commissioning ==
She was laid down by the Bethlehem Shipbuilding, San Pedro, California 12 December 1942; launched 13 June 1943; sponsored by Mrs Lewis B. Porterfield and commissioned 30 October 1943.

== Namesake ==
Lewis Broughton Porterfield was born on 30 October 1879 in Greenville, Alabama. He was appointed Naval Cadet from Alabama on 8 September 1898. He became a Midshipman in July 1902, Ensign on 2 May 1904, Lieutenant on 2 May 1907, Lieutenant Commander on 4 March 1915, Commander on 1 July 1919, Captain on 16 February 1925 and rear admiral on 1 July 1937.

His commands included the patrol boats USS Albatross and USS Venetia, the gunboat USS Wheeling and Destroyer Squadron 11. He served finally as Chief of Staff in the 12th Naval District. He received the Distinguished Service Medal for anti-submarine operations during World War I while commanding USS Venetia. He died in Oakland, California, on 5 April 1942.

== World War II ==
=== 1944 ===
Following her shakedown, Porterfield joined Task Force 53 (TF 53), getting underway 12 January 1944 and arriving off the Marshalls on the 31st. Porterfield's first job was shore bombardment around the Kwajalein Islands, followed by shelling Roi and Namur.

By 4 February, the situation was well in hand and Porterfield left to convoy several cargo and transport ships to Funafuti. Here she joined three merchantmen and another destroyer, Fletcher, en route to Majuro. On 20 February Porterfield got underway from Majuro in company with a division of battleships for shore bombardment in the Marshalls. The destroyers screened as the battleships’ shelled installations for two days.

She returned to Pearl Harbor, Porterfield then joined the replenishment group for the fast carrier task force, screening the oilers. This duty continued until the end of April, when Porterfield again set course for Pearl Harbor.

Porterfield was tasked to screen escort carriers during the Marianas invasion. The group sortied from Pearl Harbor 30 June, with Porterfield's group of carriers supplying air cover for the advance. The group arrived off Saipan 15 June and enemy air attacks began shortly after. Porterfield stayed with the force, rescuing two pilots, before being sent to Eniwetok 1 July for dry-docking. After her repairs, the ship reached Saipan again on 11 July and operated with the carrier screen until sent to Guam early in August.

On 3 August, Porterfield was detached from the carrier group to join the Fast Carrier Task Force (then 5th Fleet's TF 58). She rendezvoused with Task Group 58.4 (TG 58.4) east of Guam 6 August and operated with that group during the rest of the Guam campaign, returning to Eniwetok 10 August.

The group put to sea again on 29 August and launched raids against Palau and Mindanao in support of the landings in the Palaus. The ships remained in the general area between the Philippines and the Palaus during September.

The carrier force left Ulithi on 6 October, with Okinawa and Formosa as their objectives. Air raids were heavier this time and Porterfield claiming three aircraft shot down, also rescuing the crew of a torpedo bomber from the carrier Hornet. Following the attacks on Okinawa and Formosa, the group was sent to the Philippines to search for units of the Japanese Fleet.

At dawn 25 October, carrier aircraft from the formation began their strikes against the Japanese forces, crippling the entire group and sending it back to Japan. Porterfield was ordered to join four cruisers to finish off any damaged ships. The group engaged one Japanese cruiser that sank just as the destroyers pressed a torpedo attack.

The group sailed again on 1 November for an operating area east of Samar. On the morning of the 5th, the carriers launched a strike against Luzon, amid poor weather. Porterfield rescued a pilot from Langley using one of her lifeboats

On 22 November, she sailed from Ulithi for raids on Luzon, returning to Ulithi for resupply on 3 December. A week later, she was underway for Luzon and recovered another Langley pilot on the 13th.

On the group's next raid was the South China Sea via the Bashi Channel between Formosa and Luzon.

=== 1945 ===
The group cleared the China Sea on 19 January 1945 and conducted airstrikes against Formosa. Two Kamikaze suicide aircraft crashed into the carrier Ticonderoga and a bomb hit Langley's flight deck. Further strikes were launched against Okinawa before the group returned to Ulithi 27 January.

On 10 February, the ships sailed to support of the Iwo Jima landings. On the second day out, Porterfield rescued two pilots from the carrier Cowpens (CVL-25). The Fast Carrier Task Force penetrated within 60 miles (110 km) of Tokyo without being attacked and then retired toward Iwo Jima to provide naval gunfire support for the landings and claimed another aircraft destroyed.

Early on the morning of 26 February, Porterfield picked up a Japanese picket boat on her radar screen and sank her. One of the Porterfield officers, Ensign Burton James Brown, was awarded the Navy Cross (posthumously) for heroism during this action.

The following day, with the weather improving, the task group refuelled and Porterfield departed for Ulithi, arriving on 1 March. She stayed in Ulithi for three weeks before leaving for Okinawa Jima, where she was to supply fire support for the landings on Kerama Retto and Okinawa.

On 6 April, as the ships were forming for night retirement, kamikaze suicide aircraft appeared over the fleet, diving at any ship which presented a good target. Porterfield claimed one shot down before being tasked to aid the destroyers Leutze and Newcomb, manoeuvring close to the two burning ships to rescue survivors. She screened the damaged ships to Kerama Retto and transferred the wounded to a hospital ship.

Later that day, Porterfield was ordered with Task Force 54, to intercept units of the Japanese fleet, including the battleship Yamato, which were steaming toward Okinawa. Porterfield returned to Okinawa, where she continued screening and bombardment duty during which she claimed two more Japanese aircraft shot down.

On April 12, another heavy air attack materialized. Porterfield, in the leading screen position in her formation, met the attackers, which included about 10 bombers and torpedo planes. With one of her five-inch (127 mm) guns out of commission, she threw up a tremendous amount of fire, claiming four aircraft. Four more were brought down as they proceeded over Porterfield to the main units. Two managed to crash into ships, one hitting a destroyer and another into a battleship. Porterfield continued her fire support, claiming another enemy aircraft before being forced to return to the rear area due to damage to an engine. Upon arriving in Saipan, she was immediately ordered back to Okinawa as a convoy escort.

Early in May, she was ordered back to Ulithi where she remained until 20 June, when she got underway for Okinawa, only to find that the engine previously damaged was still inoperative. On 4 July Porterfield was ordered back to the Puget Sound Navy Yard. The ship arrived at the Puget Sound Navy Yard on 24 July and was still undergoing repairs at the end of the war. On 27 September she reported to the Pacific Fleet and on 3 October got underway for San Diego for decommissioning.

== 1951 – 1969 ==
Porterfield recommissioned 27 April 1951 and arrived Pearl Harbor 28 July, steaming for Yokosuka, Japan 7 August. Her first Korean assignment was in support of United Nations policies as a part of Task Force 77 off the Korean East Coast where she performed screening and destroyer duties. On 12 December Porterfield joined Task Group 95.11 in the Yellow Sea off the Korean West Coast and until late December acted as a screening unit and plane guard as well as participating in numerous close support patrols.

Porterfield returned to San Diego on 8 March 1952, commencing her second far eastern tour on 4 October. With Task Force 77 off the Korean East Coast, the ship's duties consisted mainly of screening the fast carriers and occasional shore bombardment. This was followed by Taiwan patrol duty. She returned to San Diego on 6 May 1953.

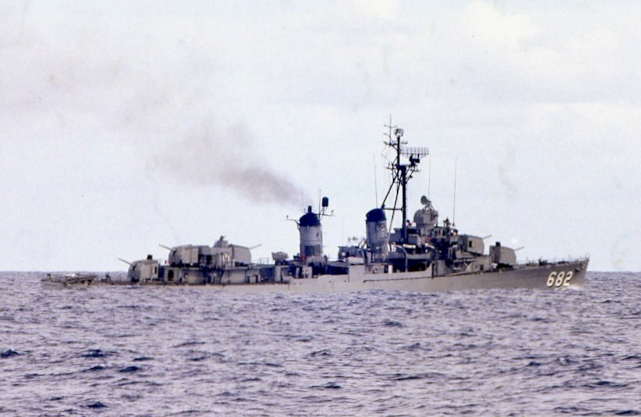
USS Porterfield, 1966-67.

Porterfield continued to alternate periods of underway training and operations off the California coast with deployments to the western Pacific which took place in 1954, 1955, 1956, 1957 and 1958. On the last of these deployments Porterfield participated in the Taiwan patrol for several weeks commencing with the intensification of military action from mainland China against the off-shore islands.

On her eighth Western Pacific cruise in 1959 Porterfield operated extensively as a Hunter Killer AntiSubmarine Task Group member. She deployed again from November 1960 to April 1961 and from November 1962 to June 1963. Further western Pacific deployments were made in 1964 and 1966, when she worked with amphibious groups off the coast of Vietnam. During the summer of 1965, Porterfield visited San Francisco, Puget Sound and Hawaii as part of the Pacific Midshipman Training Squadron.

Porterfield was decommissioned on 7 November 1969, stricken from the Naval Vessel Register 1 March 1975. Designated as a target in 1976 and sunk on 18 July 1982.

== Awards ==
Porterfield received ten battle stars for World War II service and four battle stars for Korean War service.
