= HMCS Elk =

Armed yacht of the Royal Canadian Navy

- HMCS Elk

History
- Name: Arcadia (1928–1940, 1945–1946); Grand Manan III (1946–1968)
- Builder: Newport News SB. Co., Newport News, Virginia
- Launched: 3 April 1926
- In service: August 1926
- Out of service: 1940
- Fate: Transferred to Royal Canadian Navy 1940–1945, scrapped 1968

Canada
- Name: Elk
- Namesake: Elk, a large deer species found in North America
- Acquired: 1940
- Commissioned: 10 September 1940
- Decommissioned: 4 August 1945
- Identification: Pennant number: S05/Z27
- Honours and awards: Gulf of St. Lawrence 1942, 1944.
- Fate: Sold for commercial use

General characteristics
- Type: Armed yacht
- Displacement: 578 long tons (587 t)
- Length: 188 ft (57 m)
- Beam: 27 ft (8.2 m)
- Draught: 11 ft (3.4 m)
- Speed: 11 knots (20 km/h; 13 mph)
- Complement: 40
- Armament: 1 × 4 in (102 mm) gun

HMCS Elk was an armed yacht serving with the Royal Canadian Navy during the Second World War. Prior to Canadian service, the ship was named Arcadia. She was used initially as a patrol vessel, but later saw use as a training and guard ship for submarines on the East Coast of Canada. Following the war, Elk was sold for commercial use and returned to her original name. She was renamed Grand Manan III in 1946 and used as a short-haul passenger ferry before being broken up in 1968.

== Design and description ==
Constructed as a yacht, the vessel had a gross register tonnage (GRT) of 578, was 174 feet (53.1 m) long between perpendiculars and had a beam of 28 feet (8.4 m). The vessel was powered by two diesel engines, each driving one shaft, giving the yacht a maximum speed of 15 knots (28 km/h; 17 mph). In Canadian service as an armed yacht, Elk was 188 feet (57.3 m) long overall with a beam of 27 feet (8.2 m) and a draught of 11 feet (3.4 m). The vessel had a displacement of 578 long tons (587 t) and a maximum speed of 11 knots (20 km/h; 13 mph). Elk was armed with one 4-inch (102 mm) gun, placed forward, and had a complement of 5 officers and 35 crew.

== Career ==
The yacht was built by the Newport News Shipbuilding Company at Newport News, Virginia with the yard number 304 and launched as Arcadia on 3 April 1926. Arcadia was completed in August 1926. Owned by Margaret S. Hardwick, the vessel was registered in Boston, Massachusetts.

=== Canadian service ===
After failing to acquire any British vessels at the outset of the Second World War for auxiliary purposes, the Royal Canadian Navy discreetly searched the American market for suitable ships. However, American law prevented the sale of ships for possible use in the war to any of the belligerents. The Royal Canadian Navy, requisitioned unsuitable Canadian yachts and had their respective owners go the United States and buy those ships the navy wanted as replacements. Once the ships arrived in Canada, the navy then returned the original yachts and requisitioned the new ones. Arcadia was one such ship and was acquired by the Royal Canadian Navy in Spring 1940.

Following the ship's arrival, the vessel was sent to Pictou, Nova Scotia where the 4-inch naval gun was installed. Commissioned on 10 September 1940 at Halifax, Nova Scotia they renamed her Elk, in common with the conventions where armed yachts took the names of animals native to Canada. The vessel was given the pennant number S05 initially, this later being changed to Z27.

Elk was ordered to the America and West Indies Station after commissioning and arrived on 23 September. She remained there until 13 May 1941 when she returned to Canada for a refit. Following the refit, the ship was sent to Trinidad, arriving on the 2 December 1941, returning only the following May. Once back, Elk was assigned to Sydney Force based out of Sydney, Nova Scotia utilized as a convoy escort for convoys on the Sydney – Corner Brook run. In September 1942 Elk and fellow armed yacht HMCS Husky were providing the main escort for ships travelling from Sydney to Halifax.

At the beginning of 1943, Elk was sidelined, becoming one of the first vessels to undergo repairs at the new repair yard in Shelburne, Nova Scotia. Following completion of repairs, the armed yacht was ordered to Digby, Nova Scotia in May and alternating between Shelburne and Digby, employed as a training ship and escort for submarine HMS L23, also assigned for training purposes. Elk remained in such a role for the remainder of the war, being paid off on 4 August 1945.

=== Postwar service ===
On 4 September 1945, Elk was put up for disposal and returned to her original name. The yacht was sold to Saint John Marine Tpts Ltd that year and converted to a cargo vessel. Registered in Saint John, New Brunswick, the vessel was renamed Grand Manan III and was placed in service as a short-haul passenger ferry. In 1966, Grand Manan III was sold to St. John Tug Boat Co Ltd. She remained as a passenger ferry until being sold in 1968 for breaking up. The vessel was taken to Baltimore, Maryland and broken up by Boston Metals Co. in September 1969.
