= Oliver Gould Jennings =

American politician (1865–1936)

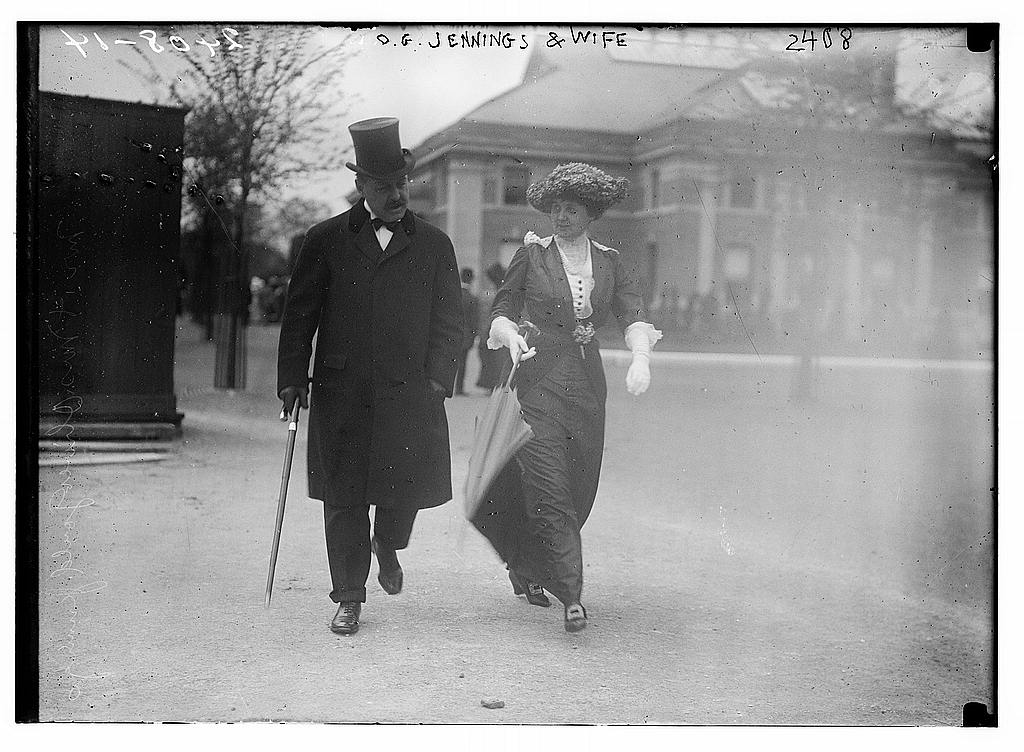
Jennings and his wife in 1914

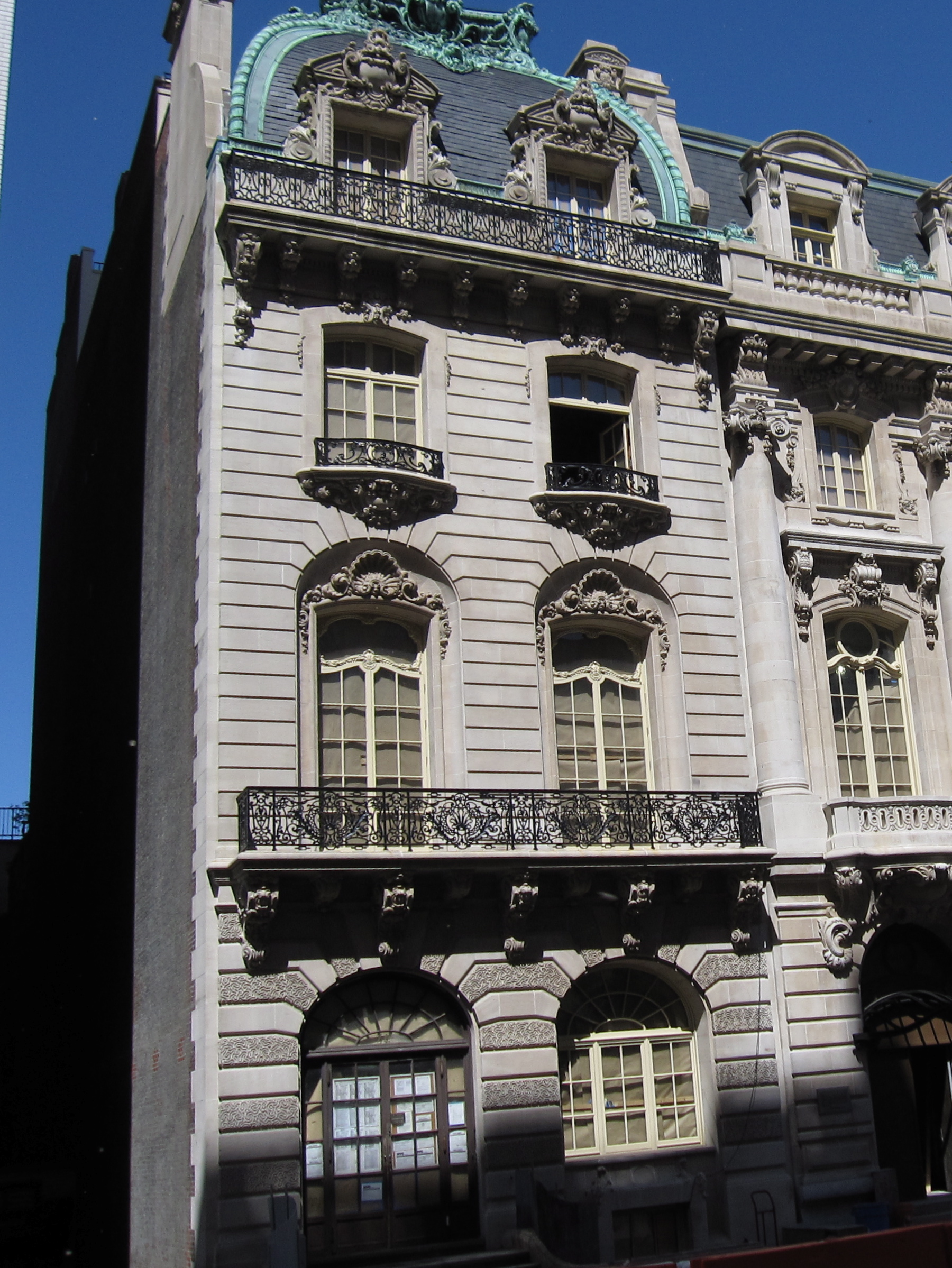
Oliver Gould Jennings House

Oliver Gould Jennings (April 27, 1865 – October 13, 1936) was an American financier and an heir to a fortune from Standard Oil who served in the Connecticut House of Representatives.

== Early life and education ==
Jennings was born on April 27, 1865, in New York City. He was the youngest son of Oliver Burr Jennings (1825–1893) and Esther Judson (née Goodsell) Jennings (1828–1908). His older siblings were Annie Burr Jennings, a philanthropist, a philanthropist. Walter Jennings, Helen Goodsell Jennings (wife of Dr. Walter Belknap James), and Emma Brewster Jennings, wife of Hugh Dudley Auchincloss Sr.

His maternal aunt, Almira Geraldine Goodsell, was the wife of Standard Oil co-founder William A. Rockefeller, Jr. Through his sister Emma, he was the uncle of Hugh D. Auchincloss, whose third wife was Janet Lee Bouvier, mother of First Lady Jackie Kennedy.

Jennings attended Phillips Andover, graduated from Yale University, was an 1887 initiate into Yale's Skull and Bones Society, and later graduated from Columbia Law School.

== Career ==
Jennings served on the boards of Bethlehem Steel, United States Industrial Alcohol Company, McKesson & Robbins, Kingsport Press, Signature Company, National Fuel Gas, and Grocery Store Products.

In 1923, Jennings was elected to serve in the Connecticut House of Representatives.

== Personal life ==
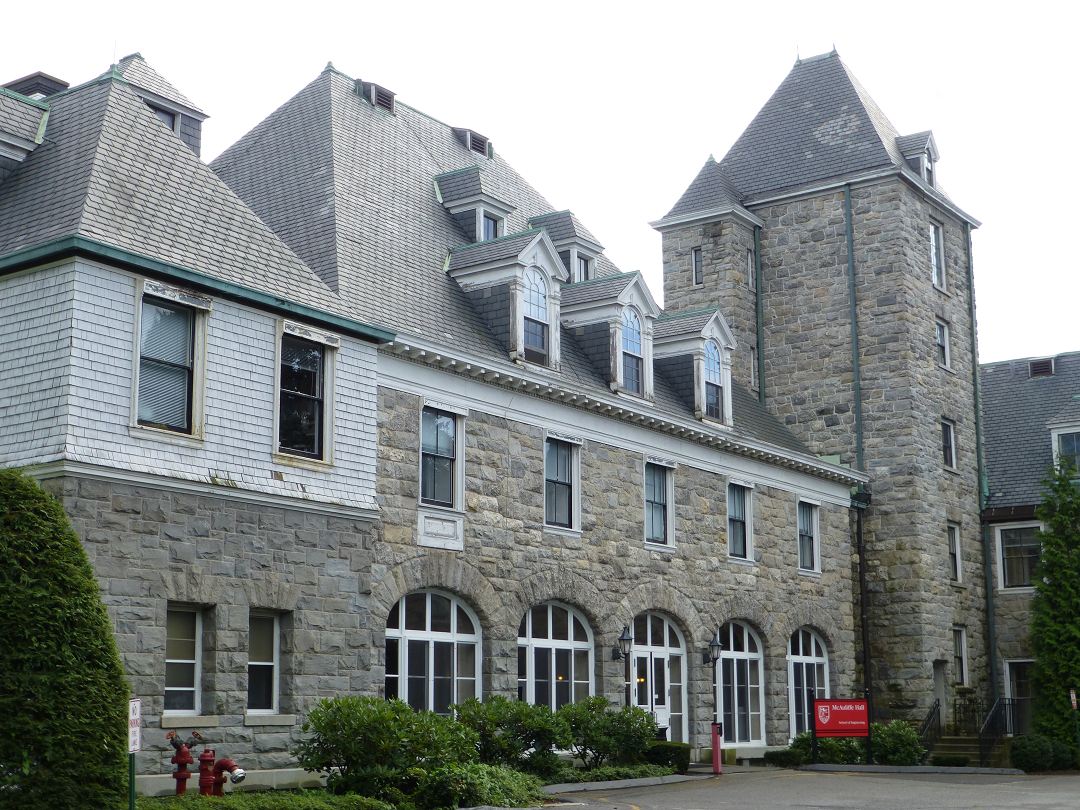
Mailands in Fairfield, Connecticut

In 1896, he married Mary Dows Brewster (1871–1964), daughter of industrialist Benjamin Brewster and Elmina Hersey Dows. Together, they had two children:

- Benjamin Brewster Jennings (1898–1968), who married Kate deForest Prentice (1903–1994), a daughter of John Henry Prentice, in 1923.
- Lawrence Kirtland Jennings (1903–1973), who married Beatrice Black, eldest daughter of Witherbee Black of the family silversmith firm Black, Starr & Frost-Gorham, in 1927.

Jennings built a forty-room French Renaissance style home called the Mailands in Fairfield, Connecticut. The building later became part of the campus of Fairfield University and was renamed McAuliffe Hall. Jennings also owned a mansion on East 72nd Street in New York City, which is now known as Oliver Gould Jennings House.

== Death ==
He died on October 13, 1936. His funeral was held at St. James Protestant Episcopal Church in New York City, with the Rev. H. W. B. Donegan presiding, with burial in Fairfield, Connecticut following a service at St. Paul's Church there. His wife died in 1964 at the age of 93.
