= USS See W. See =

Patrol vessel of the United States Navy

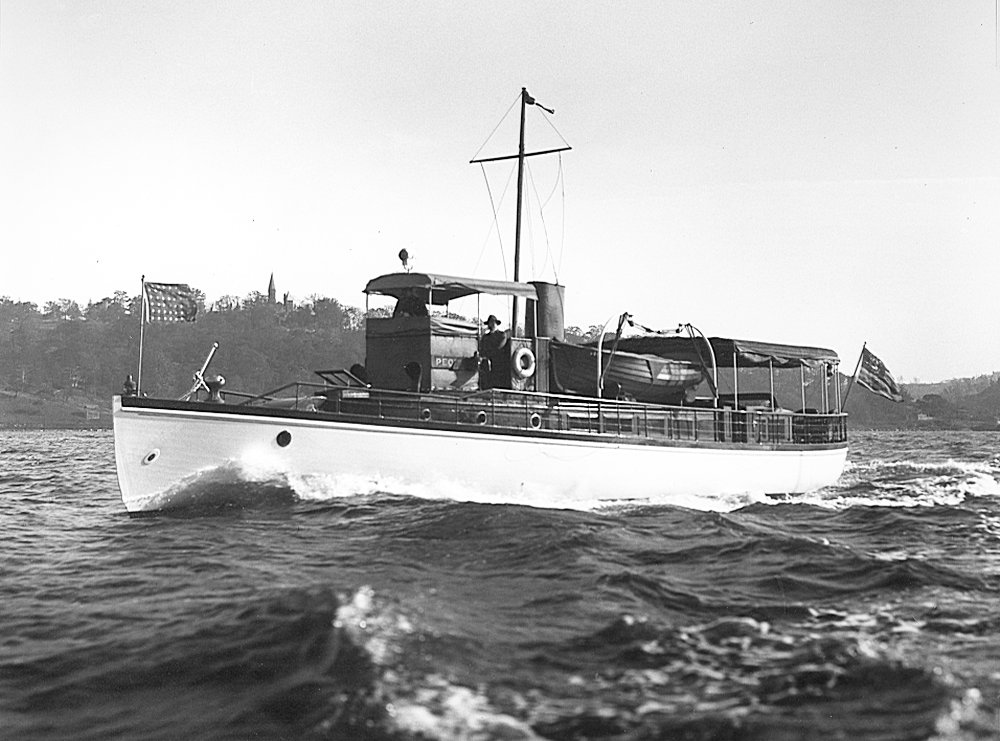
- See W. See as the private motorboat Pequest ca. 1919

History

United States
- Name: USS See W. See
- Namesake: Previous name retained
- Builder: W. F. Downs, Bay Shore, New York
- Completed: 1915
- Acquired: 18 June 1917
- Commissioned: 18 August 1917
- Decommissioned: 13 December 1918
- Stricken: 14 December 1918
- Fate: Returned to owner 14 December 1918
- Status: Extant
- Notes: Operated as private motorboat See W. See 1915-1917 and as See W. See, Pequest, Rosalie IV, Jonbob II, Mar-Sue II and Misty Isle, and Mar-Sue since 1919

General characteristics
- Type: Patrol vessel
- Tonnage: 26 Gross register tons
- Length: 65 ft (20 m)
- Beam: 13 ft 1 in (3.99 m)
- Draft: 3 ft 8 in (1.12 m)
- Speed: 12 knots

USS See W. See (SP-740) was a United States Navy patrol vessel in commission from 1917 to 1919.

See W. See was built in 1915 as a private motorboat of the same name by W. F. Downs at Bay Shore, New York. On 18 June 1917, the U.S. Navy acquired her from her owner, Charles W. Cushman of Vernon, New York, for use as a section patrol vessel during World War I. She was commissioned as USS See W. See (SP-740) on 18 August 1917.

See W. See operated from Section Base No. 5 on patrol duty off the entrance to New York Harbor for the rest of World War I.

See W. See was decommissioned on 13 December 1918, stricken from the Navy List, and returned to Cushman.

Ca. 1919, Cushman sold See W. See to T. K. Morris, who renamed her Pequest. She had many name changes in succeeding decades, being known successively as Rosalie IV, Jonbob II (she is known to have borne this name from at least 1950 until at least 1955), Mar-Sue II (from at least 1960 until at least 1975), and Misty Isle (at least in 1977). William L. "Butch" Baxter purchased the boat in 1975 and apparently sometime after 1977 renamed her Mar-Sue.

As of 2010, Mar-Sue remains active in private use.
