= USS Sunbeam III =

Patrol vessel of the United States Navy

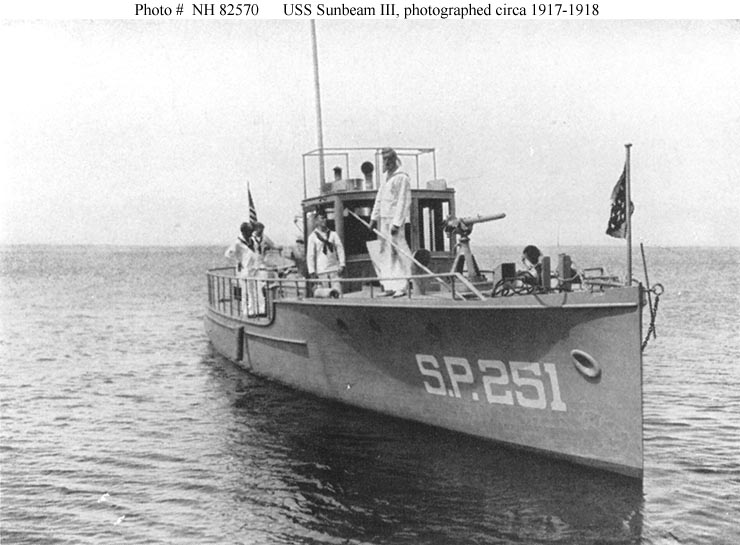
- USS Sunbeam III during World War I. Her 1-pounder gun is visible on her foredeck.

History

United States
- Name: USS Sunbeam III
- Namesake: Previous name retained
- Builder: Charles L. Seabury Company and Gas Engine and Power Company, Morris Heights, the Bronx, New York
- Completed: 1917
- Acquired: 16 June 1917
- Commissioned: 18 July 1917
- Stricken: 21 January 1919
- Fate: Returned to owner
- Notes: Operated as civilian motorboat Sunbeam III 1917 and from 1919

General characteristics
- Type: Patrol vessel
- Length: 52 ft (16 m)
- Beam: 11 ft 4 in (3.45 m)
- Draft: 3 ft (0.91 m) mean
- Speed: 14 miles per hour
- Complement: 8
- Armament: 1 × 1-pounder gun; 1 × .30-caliber (7.62-millimeter) machine gun

USS Sunbeam III (SP-251) was a United States Navy patrol vessel in commission from 1917 to 1919. The prefix designator means Section Patrol Craft.

Sunbeam III was built as a civilian motorboat of the same name in 1917 by the Charles L. Seabury Company and the Gas Engine and Power Company at Morris Heights in the Bronx, New York. Her owner, Mr. R. B. Roosevelt of New York City, loaned her to the U.S. Navy under a free lease agreement for World War I service as a patrol vessel. She was delivered to the Navy on 16 June 1917 and commissioned as USS Sunbeam III (SP-251) on 18 July 1917.

Sunbeam III was assigned to section patrol duty to protect antisubmarine nets in the New York Harbor area for the remainder of World War I.

Sunbeam III was stricken from the Navy List on 21 January 1919 and returned to Roosevelt.

This craft is not the same Sunbeam which was sold to a new owner in 1923, and through navigation error, found itself stranded in the Niagara River. There are stark visual differences in the configuration of the wheelhouse, stack, and general size of the boat compared to photos from Niagara Falls Public Library. In addition, the Sunbeam stranded above Horseshoe falls was 80 feet long, whereas this vessel was only 52 feet in length.

== See also ==
- Niagara Scow
