= USS Sylph (PY-12) =

Patrol vessel of the United States Navy

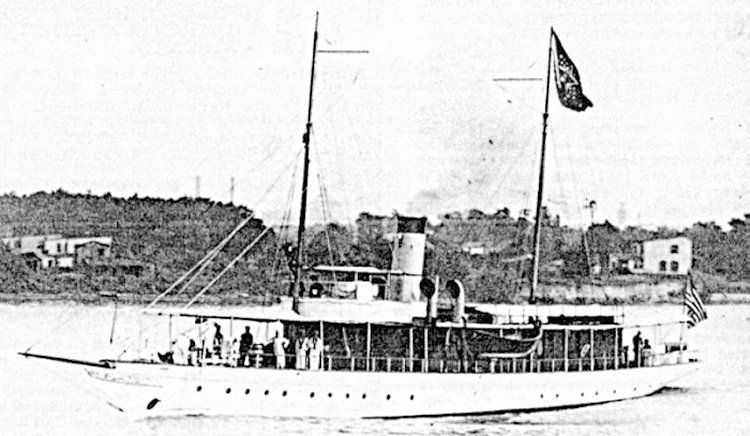
- USS Sylph (PY-12), steaming down the Potomac River: The Washington, DC, skyline can be seen in the background.

History

United States
- Name: Intrepid (1929–1940); Sylph (1940–1946)
- Namesake: Sylph
- Builder: George Lawley & Son, Neponset, Massachusetts
- Completed: 1929
- Acquired: 16 July 1940
- Commissioned: 19 July 1940
- Decommissioned: 19 December 1945
- Renamed: Sylph, 19 July 1940
- Reclassified: Patrol Yacht, PY-12, 19 July 1940
- Stricken: 8 January 1946
- Identification: Hull symbol:YP-71; Hull symbol:PY-12; Code letters:NBUB (YP-71); Code letters:NBBC (PY-12)
- Fate: Unknown

General characteristics
- Type: Yacht 1929–1940; Patrol Yacht 1940–1946
- Displacement: 810 long tons (823 t)
- Length: 205 ft 3 in (62.56 m)
- Beam: 33 ft 10 in (10.31 m)
- Draft: 16 ft 10 in (5.13 m)
- Installed power: Winton 128A diesel engine; 1,000 shp (750 kW)
- Propulsion: 1 × screw
- Sail plan: Barquentine (removed 1940)
- Speed: 10 knots (19 km/h; 12 mph)
- Complement: 88
- Armament: 2 × 3 in (76 mm)/50 caliber guns; 1 × depth charge track; 1 × "Y"-gun depth charge projector; 2 × "K"-gun depth charge projectors; 2 × .30-caliber (7.62-millimeter) Lewis machine guns; 2 × .50-caliber (12.7-millimeter) M2 Browning machine guns

USS Sylph (PY-12), briefly YP-71, was a yacht in commission in the United States Navy as a patrol yacht from 1940 to 1946.

== Construction, acquisition, and commissioning ==
Intrepid (YP-71), a yacht built in 1929 at Neponset, Massachusetts, by George Lawley & Son, was acquired by the Navy on 16 July 1940. She was renamed Sylph and redesignated PY-12 three days later. After conversion in New York City by the Sullivan Drydock and Repair Corporation, she was commissioned on 1 October 1940.

== Service history ==
After commissioning, she remained at New York City, assigned to the Third Naval District to train reserve midshipmen. Soon after America's entry into World War II, Sylph was fitted with sound gear and depth charges and assigned to Tompkinsville, New York, to help patrol for German U-boats. On 10 February 1942, she was reassigned to New London, Connecticut, whence she continued to hunt for submarines. While at New London, Sylph also helped periodically to train sonarmen, a critical personnel need in the Battle of the Atlantic. Future Hollywood actor Ernest Borgnine served as a U.S. Navy gunner's mate aboard Sylph during its antisubmarine warfare patrols of the North Atlantic.

In the fall of 1943, Sylph ceased to patrol for submarines. Assigned to Quonset Point, Rhode Island, she gave her full attention to training sonarmen and the development of equipment and techniques for finding and sinking submarines. In October 1944, Sylph and her unit, the Surface Division of the Atlantic Fleet's Antisubmarine Development Detachment, shifted base to Port Everglades, Florida. She continued to train sonarmen there and assisted in the antisubmarine warfare research effort through the end of World War II.

In September 1945, Sylph was ordered to the Commandant, 6th Naval District, at Charleston, South Carolina. She arrived at Charleston on 8 November and was decommissioned on 19 December. Her name was struck from the Navy list on 8 January 1946, and her hull was sold by the War Shipping Administration on 31 December 1946.
