= HMCS Ambler =

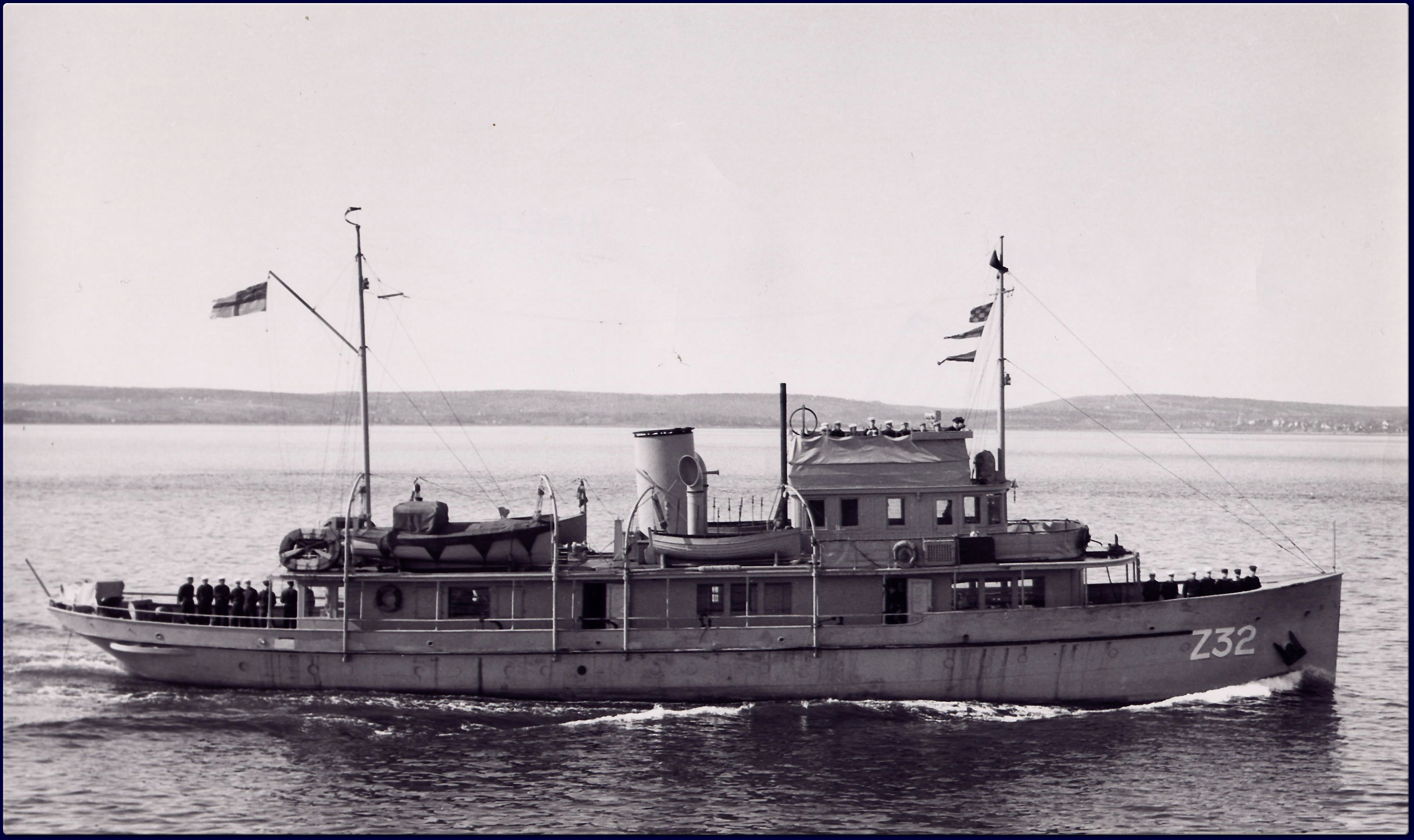
- HMCS Ambler

History

Canada
- Name: Ambler
- Builder: Tebo Yacht Basin Co., Brooklyn, New York
- Launched: 1922
- Commissioned: 6 May 1940
- Decommissioned: 20 July 1945
- Identification: Pennant number: Q11/Z32
- Fate: Sold 1947 to Greek interests

General characteristics
- Class & type: Armed yacht
- Displacement: 273 long tons (277 t)
- Length: 130 ft (40 m)
- Beam: 23 ft (7.0 m)
- Draught: 10 ft (3.0 m)
- Speed: 9 knots (17 km/h)
- Complement: 21
- Armament: 3 × .303 British machine guns

HMCS Ambler was an armed yacht that was acquired by the Royal Canadian Navy during the Second World War as a patrol and training vessel. Constructed in 1922, Ambler was under private ownership until 1940 when the vessel was requisitioned for service in the Royal Canadian Navy. Initially used as a patrol vessel, Ambler was used as a training vessel until 1945. Following the war, Ambler was sold to private interests.

== Description ==
As an armed yacht, Ambler displaced 273 long tons (277 t) and was 130 ft (40 m) long overall with a beam of 23 ft (7.0 m) and a draught of 10 ft (3.0 m). The vessel had a maximum speed of 9 knots (17 km/h). In civilian service, Ambler was crewed by seven men, with one captain and one chief engineering officer. In naval service Ambler was armed with three .303 British machine guns. The yacht's raised coaming around the forecastle prevented the installation of heavier weaponry as the coaming was considered essential for seaworthiness. The ship had a complement of 4 officers and 17 crew.

== Service history ==
Ambler was constructed by Tebo Yacht Basin Co. of Brooklyn, New York on behalf of the American millionaire Merill B. Mills and was launched in 1922. Mills sold the vessel to Louis K. Liggett, who had become rich while owning a chain of drug stores. However, by 1935, Liggett had lost much during the Great Depression and sold Ambler to the Canadian Charles H. Sheppard of the Georgian Bay Lumber Company. The vessel was turned over to Sheppard at Midland, Ontario. Sheppard, of Aurora, Ontario, used Ambler as a pleasure yacht in and around Georgian Bay, homeporting the vessel at Waubaushene, Ontario. The finishings aboard the yacht were exquisite, with engraved table silver and china and decks of cards with photographs of the vessel on their backs.

At the onset of the Second World War, the Royal Canadian Navy was empowered to requisition any British, Canadian or Commonwealth ship from private owners that were in Canada at the time for use as auxiliary vessels. Sheppard gifted the yacht to the Royal Canadian Navy in late 1939, with the Royal Canadian Navy chartering the vessel for $1. Ambler was the only vessel taken from a Canadian owner and found to be acceptable for use by the navy. The yacht remained at Waubaushene during the winter, and was taken to Midland, Ontario after the ice had broken up.

Ambler was requisitioned in May 1940 and commissioned on 6 May 1940 at Midland, initially carrying the pennant number Q11 and later Z32. The vessel was sent to Quebec City where she was the second ship to be converted to an armed yacht and had her armament installed. Ambler's initial posting was as a patrol ship in the Gulf of St. Lawrence and St. Lawrence River. She remained there until October 1941 when the ship was transferred to Halifax and used as a tender ship to HMCS Stadacona. In 1942 she was transferred to HMCS Cornwallis as a training ship and remained there for the rest of the war. Ambler was paid off on 20 July 1945 and placed in reserve at Sydney, Nova Scotia. The vessel was put up for disposal on 31 January 1946, and in 1947 Ambler was sold to Greek interests.
