= Oliver Burr Jennings =

American businessman (1825–1893)

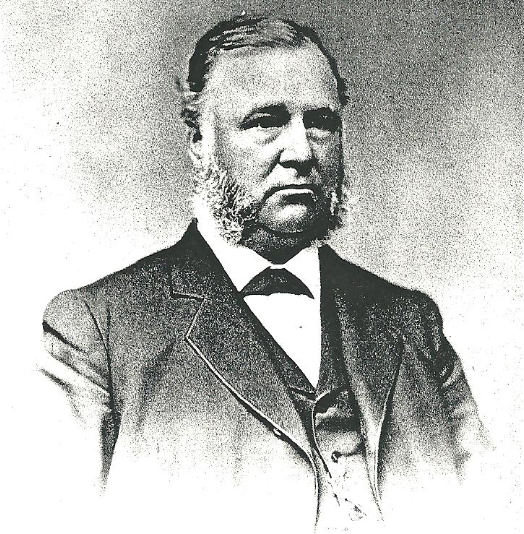
- Born: June 3, 1826; Fairfield, Connecticut, U.S.
- Died: February 12, 1893 (aged 66); New York City, New York, U.S.
- Spouse: Esther Judson Goodsell (m. 1854; died 1893)
- Children: 5, including Walter, Oliver
- Relatives: Brewster Jennings (grandson); Hugh D. Auchincloss Jr. (grandson)

Oliver Burr Jennings (June 3, 1825 – February 12, 1893) was an American businessman and one of the original stockholders in Standard Oil.

== Early life ==
Jennings was born in 1825 in Fairfield, Connecticut, to Abraham Gould Jennings and Anna (née Burr) Jennings. His brother was Frederick B. Jennings. At a young age he came to New York to learn the dry goods business. Through his great-grandfather, Peter Burr, he was distantly related to U.S. Vice President Aaron Burr.

== Career ==
In 1847 he headed West to seek his fortune in the California Gold Rush. He set up a general mercantile store in San Francisco with Benjamin Brewster an amassed a considerable fortune by outfitting prospecting camps along the coast and around Sacramento.

=== Standard Oil ===
In 1862, he returned to New York with the intention of retiring from all business activities. Due to his close relationship with his wife's brother-in-law, Standard Oil co-founder William Rockefeller Jr., he became interested in the affairs of the Standard Oil Company. In 1871, when Standard Oil was incorporated in Ohio, Jennings was one of the original stockholders. Of the initial 10,000 shares, John D. Rockefeller received 2,667; William Rockefeller, Henry Flagler, and Samuel Andrews received 1,333 each; Stephen V. Harkness received 1,334; Jennings received 1,000; and the firm of Rockefeller, Andrews & Flagler received 1,000.

Jennings served as a director of Standard Oil of Ohio and then as a trustee of the Standard Oil Trust that resulted from the company's reorganization in 1882.

== Personal life ==
On December 13, 1854, he married Esther Judson Goodsell (1828–1908) in Fairfield. Her younger sister, Almira Geraldine Goodsell, was the wife of William Rockefeller Jr. Together, Oliver and Esther had five children:

- Annie Burr Jennings (1855–1939), a philanthropist.
- Walter Jennings (1858–1933), the director of Standard Oil Company of New Jersey and president of the Jekyll Island Club from 1927 until 1933.
- Helen Goodsell Jennings (1860–1946), who married Dr. Walter Belknap James (1858–1927), president of the Jekyll Island Club from 1919 until 1927.
- Emma Brewster Jennings (1861–1942), who married Hugh D. Auchincloss Sr. (1858–1913).
- Oliver Gould Jennings (1865–1936), who married Mary Dows Brewster (b. 1871), daughter of Benjamin Brewster and Elmina Hersey Dows.

Jennings died in 1893 at his residence in New York City. His estate amounted to US$10,000,000 (equivalent to $358,333,333 in 2025), which he left entirely to his family.

=== Descendants ===
Jennings's grandchildren include businessman Benjamin Brewster Jennings (1898–1968) and stockbroker Hugh D. Auchincloss Jr. (1897–1976), who married Janet Lee Bouvier. and Anne Burr Auchincloss, who married Wilmarth S. Lewis and spent her fortune to setting up the Lewis Walpole Library at Yale University, devoted to the life and works of Horace Walpole, the builder of Strawberry Hill House.
