= Walter Jennings (industrialist) =

American industrialist

Walter Jennings (September 14, 1858 - January 9, 1933) was an American industrialist who served as president of National Fuel Gas Company and the Jekyll Island Club.

== Early life ==
Jennings was born on September 14, 1858, in San Francisco, California. He was the eldest son of Standard Oil co-founder Oliver Burr Jennings (1825–1893) and Esther Judson (née Goodsell) Jennings (1828–1908). His siblings were Annie Burr Jennings (a philanthropist), a philanthropist. Helen Goodsell Jennings (wife of Dr. Walter Belknap James), Emma Brewster Jennings (wife of Hugh Dudley Auchincloss Sr.), and Oliver Gould Jennings, who served in the Connecticut House of Representatives.

His maternal aunt, Almira Geraldine Goodsell, was the wife of William A. Rockefeller, Jr. Among his first cousins were William Goodsell Rockefeller, Percy Avery Rockefeller, and Geraldine Rockefeller (wife of Marcellus Hartley Dodge Sr.). Through his sister Emma, he was an uncle of Hugh D. Auchincloss, whose third wife was Janet Lee Bouvier, mother of First Lady Jackie Kennedy. He was also a distant cousin of Aaron Burr, the former Vice President of the United States.

Jennings attended Phillips Andover and graduated from Yale University in 1880 where he was a member of Delta Kappa Epsilon and Yale's Skull and Bones Society. After Yale, he attended Columbia Law School where he was a classmate of future president Theodore Roosevelt, graduating in 1882.

== Career ==
After law school, he practiced law for a few months with his uncle, Frederic B. Jennings, before going to work for the Pratt Manufacturing Company, an affiliate of Standard Oil. In 1886, he went to its Oil City offices before leaving the company in 1888. In 1903, he became a director of Standard Oil of New Jersey, serving as secretary from 1908 to 1911 but remaining a member of the board until his death. From 1908 to 1919, he served as president of the National Fuel Gas Company. He was also a director of the Bank of Manhattan and a trustee of the New York Trust Company.

== Personal life ==
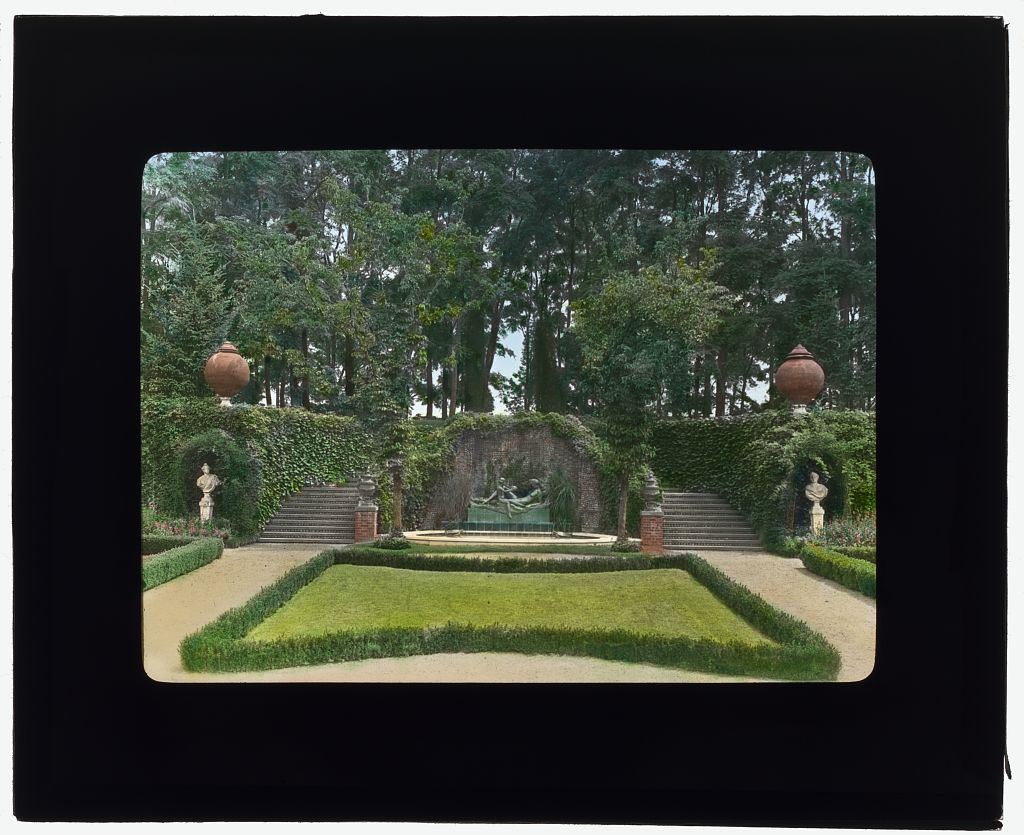
Fountain at Burrwood

On November 11, 1891, Jennings was married to Jean Pollock Brown (1864–1949) at the South Church on Madison Avenue and 38th Street in New York City. She was a daughter of Edwin Bergh Brown and Alice (née Pollock) Brown. Together, they were the parents of:

- Oliver Burr Jennings (1895–1968), who married Isabel de Rivas in 1928.
- Jeannette Jennings (1898–1985), who married Henry Calhoun Taylor (1894–1971) in 1917.
- Constance Jennings (1900–1991), who married Albert Heman Ely Jr. (1894–1964) in 1927.

In New York City, they lived at 9 East 70th Street and in the late 1890s, he became a summer resident of Cold Spring Harbor on Long Island where he had a large country home built by Carrère and Hastings and known as Burrwood. In 1928, Jennings gave significant funds towards the development of a park and bathing beach for the use of villagers and town residents known as Memorial Park.

Jennings died at his winter home in Jekyll Island on January 9, 1933. He was buried at the Memorial Cemetery of Saint John's Church in Laurel Hollow, New York, on Long Island. Burrwood was sold by his heirs in 1950. The home was later demolished and the Olmsted Brothers gazebo was moved to the Elizabeth Street Garden in the Nolita neighborhood of Manhattan.

=== Art collection ===
He was also a prominent art collector and was a lay member of the Grand Central Art Galleries. He owned a number of works by prominent artists, including two portraits of George Washington by Gilbert Stuart, a portrait of Thomas Townshend, 1st Viscount Sydney also by Stuart, companion portraits of Mr. and Mrs. Thomas Russell of Charlestown by Charles Willson Peale, a self-portrait by Thomas Sully and a portrait of John J. Sedley by Benjamin West. He also collected early American and Georgian silver, Chinese porcelain (including K'ang Hsi examples) and an English and French furniture.

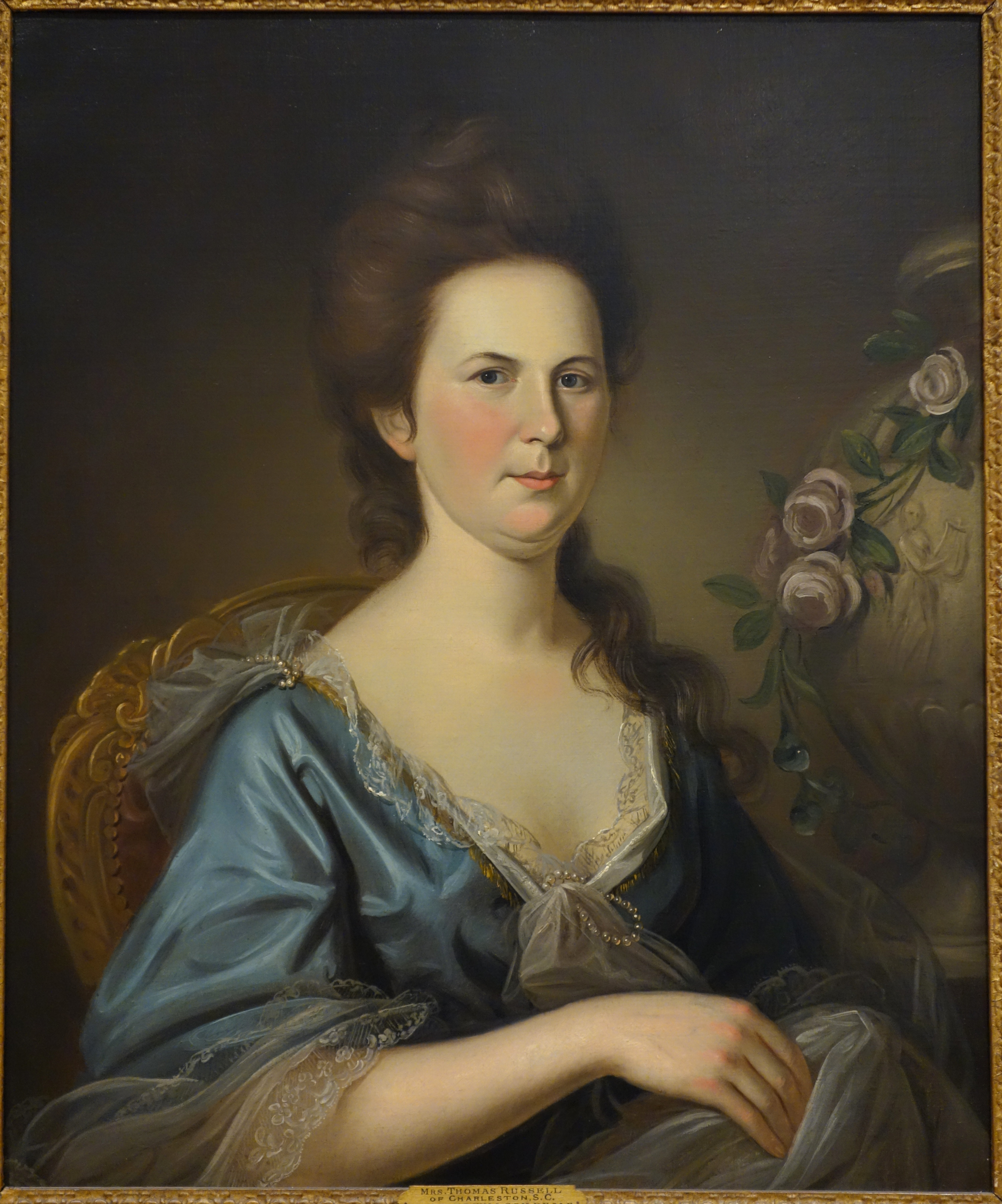
Portrait of Mrs. Thomas Russell by Charles Willson Peale

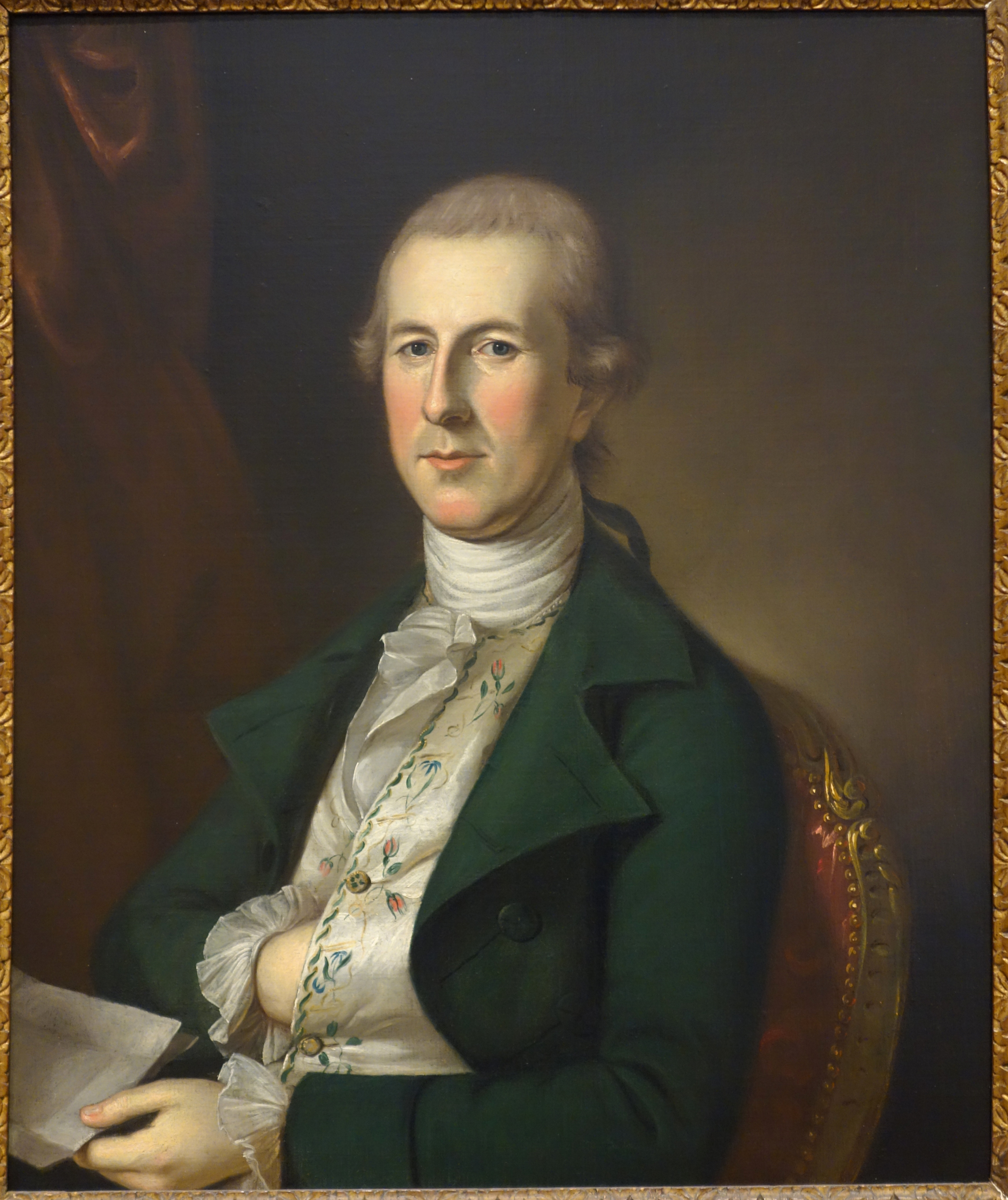
Portrait of Mr. Thomas Russell by Charles Willson Peale

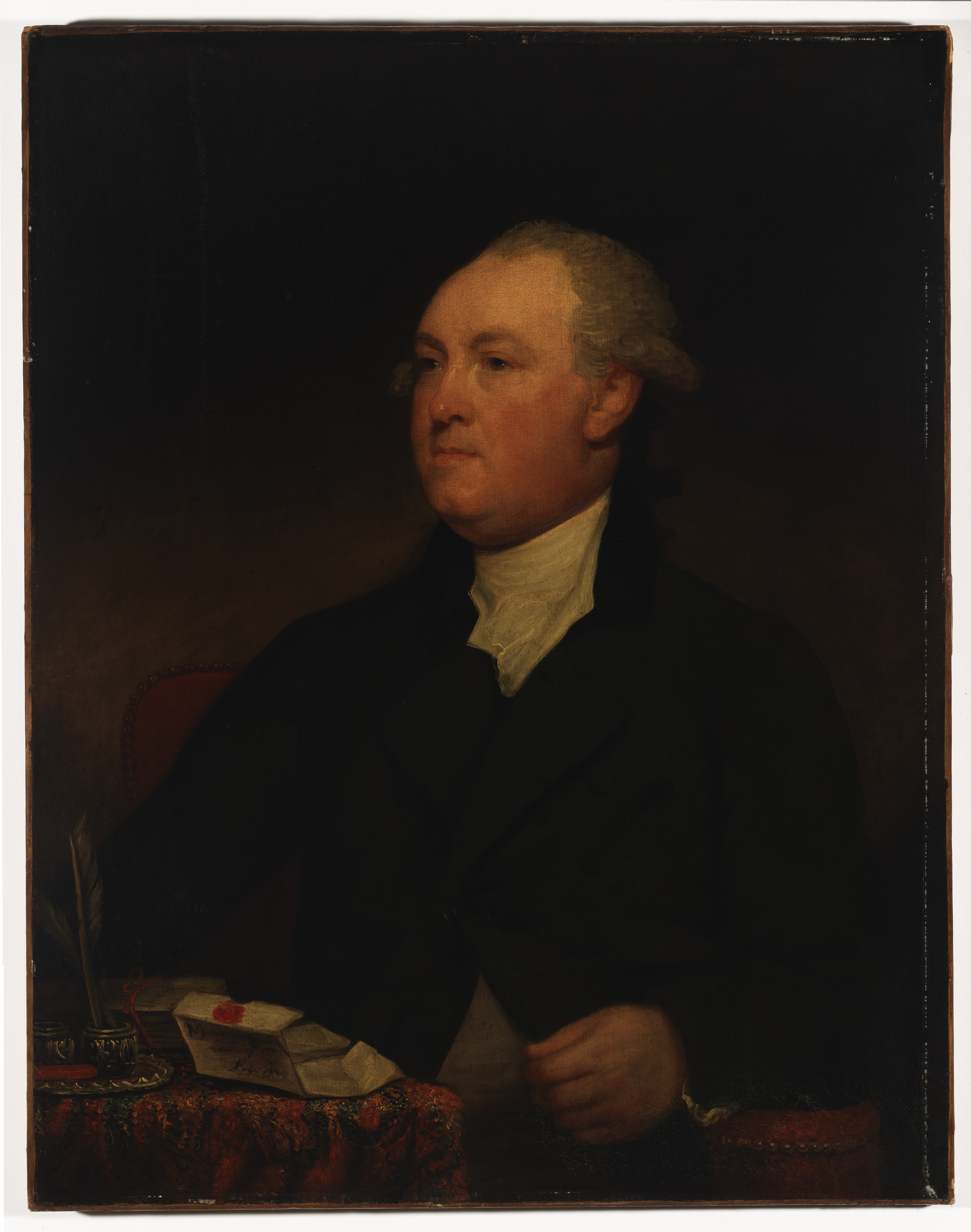
Portrait of Viscount Sydney by Gilbert Stuart

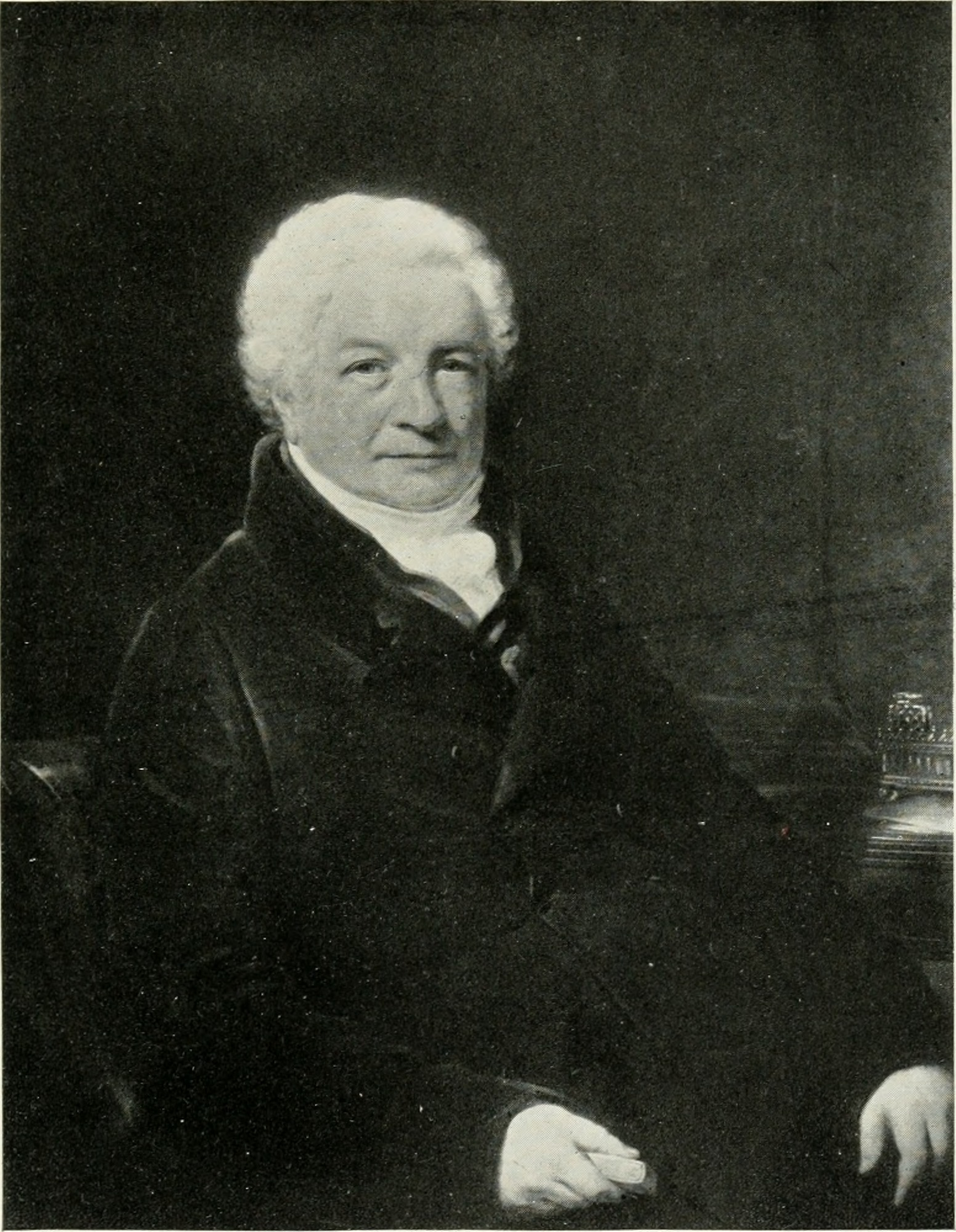
Portrait of John J Sedley, Esq. by Benjamin West
