= USS Montauk (SP-392) =

Minesweeper of the United States Navy

History

United States
- Name: USS Montauk
- Namesake: A village and fishing resort on Long Island, New York, near Montauk Point, the eastern extremity of New York
- Owner: Fisheries Products Co., Wilmington, North Carolina
- Laid down: date unknown
- Completed: in 1880 at Kennebunk, Maine; rebuilt at Wilmington, Delaware, in 1905
- Acquired: by the Navy on 17 August 1917
- In service: circa August 1917
- Out of service: 21 August 1918 (foundered)
- Homeport: Charleston, South Carolina
- Fate: Ran ashore and broke up on Cumberland Island, in the Sea Islands, on the coast of Georgia

General characteristics
- Type: Trawler
- Tonnage: 161 tons
- Length: 121 ft (37 m)
- Beam: 19 ft (5.8 m)
- Draft: 10 ft (3.0 m) (mean)
- Propulsion: not known
- Speed: 8 knots
- Complement: 24 officers and enlisted
- Armament: not known

USS Montauk (SP-392) was a trawler acquired by the U.S. Navy during World War I. She was outfitted as a coastal minesweeper and was assigned to the 6th Naval District based at Charleston, South Carolina. During a gale off the southeast coast of the United States, she ran aground on Cumberland Island and was destroyed, with a loss of life of seven of her crew.

== Built in Delaware ==
The second ship to be so named by the U.S. Navy, Montauk (SP 392), built originally at Kennebunk, Maine, in 1880, was rebuilt at Wilmington, Delaware, in 1905; and acquired by the Navy through purchase from the Fisheries Products Company, Wilmington, North Carolina, 17 August 1917.

== World War I service ==
Placed in service as a coastal minesweeper soon thereafter, Montauk patrolled the coastline of the 6th Naval District until 21 August 1918.

== Run aground and lost ==
Cruising at that time off the Georgia and Florida coast, Montauk was lost, with seven of her crew, when she ran aground and foundered at Cumberland Island, one of the barrier islands off the Georgia coast—known as the Sea Islands—in a northeasterly gale. Montauk was approximately 20 miles (32 km) from Fernandina, Florida, at the time.
