= HMCS Rimouski =

Flower-class corvette

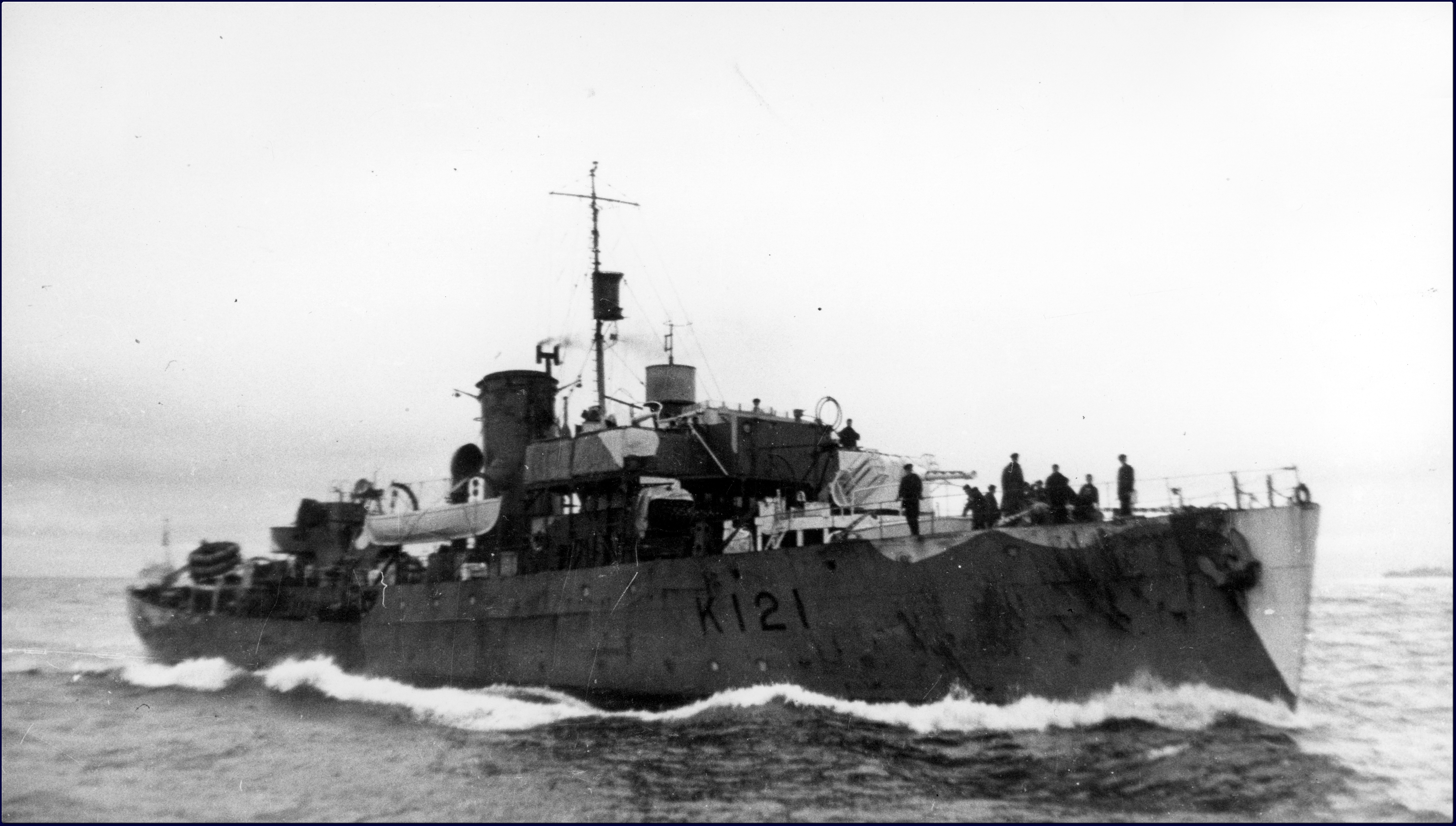
- HMCS Rimouski, circa 1944 – 1945

History

Canada
- Name: Rimouski
- Namesake: Rimouski, Quebec
- Ordered: 22 January 1940
- Builder: Davie Shipbuilding, Lauzon
- Laid down: 12 July 1940
- Launched: 3 October 1940
- Commissioned: 26 April 1941
- Decommissioned: 24 July 1945
- Identification: Pennant number: K121
- Honours and awards: Atlantic 1942-45, English Channel 1944-45, Normandy 1944
- Fate: Scrapped in December 1950 in Canada.

General characteristics
- Class & type: Flower-class corvette (original)
- Displacement: 925 long tons (940 t; 1,036 short tons)
- Length: 205 ft (62.48 m)o/a
- Beam: 33 ft (10.06 m)
- Draught: 11.5 ft (3.51 m)
- Propulsion: single shaft; 2 × fire tube Scotch boilers; 1 × 4-cycle triple-expansion reciprocating steam engine; 2,750 ihp (2,050 kW)
- Speed: 16 knots (29.6 km/h)
- Range: 3,500 nautical miles (6,482 km) at 12 knots (22.2 km/h)
- Complement: 85
- Sensors & processing systems: 1 × SW1C or 2C radar; 1 × Type 123A or Type 127DV sonar
- Armament: 1 × BL 4 in (102 mm) Mk.IX gun; 2 × .50 cal machine gun (twin); 2 × Lewis .303 cal machine gun (twin); 2 × Mk.II depth charge throwers; 2 × depth charge rails with 40 depth charges

HMCS Rimouski was a Royal Canadian Navy Flower-class corvette which took part in convoy escort duties during the Second World War. She fought primarily in the Battle of the Atlantic. She was named after Rimouski, Quebec.

== Background ==
Flower-class corvettes like Rimouski serving with the Royal Canadian Navy during the Second World War were different from earlier and more traditional sail-driven corvettes. The "corvette" designation was created by the French for classes of small warships; the Royal Navy borrowed the term for a period but discontinued its use in 1877. During the hurried preparations for war in the late 1930s, Winston Churchill reactivated the corvette class, needing a name for smaller ships used in an escort capacity, in this case based on a whaling ship design. The generic name "flower" was used to designate the class of these ships, which – in the Royal Navy – were named after flowering plants.

Corvettes commissioned by the Royal Canadian Navy during the Second World War were named after communities for the most part, to better represent the people who took part in building them. This idea was put forth by Admiral Percy W. Nelles. Sponsors were commonly associated with the community for which the ship was named. Royal Navy corvettes were designed as open sea escorts, while Canadian corvettes were developed for coastal auxiliary roles which was exemplified by their minesweeping gear. Eventually the Canadian corvettes would be modified to allow them to perform better on the open seas.

== Construction ==
Rimouski was ordered on 22 January 1940 as part of the 1939-1940 Flower-class building program. She was laid down at George T. Davie & Sons Ltd., Lauzon on 12 July 1940 and launched on 3 October 1940. She was commissioned into the RCN on 26 April 1941 at Quebec City.

Rimouski had her fo'c'sle extended during a refit at Liverpool, Nova Scotia that began in March 1943 and lasted until August. She had a second major refit from November 1944 until February 1945. That overhaul was begun at Louisburg, Nova Scotia but was completed at Halifax.

== Service history ==
After arriving at Halifax, Nova Scotia for deployment, Rimouski was initially assigned to Newfoundland Command as a convoy escort. Along with HMCS Pictou, she was one of the two first Canadian corvettes to escort an HX convoy in June 1941. She remained as part of Newfoundland Command until June 1942.

In June 1942, Rimouski joined the Western Local Escort Force. She remained with this force until March 1943 when she departed for her first significant refit. Upon her return to service, she was assigned to the Mid-Ocean Escort Force (MOEF) escort group C-1. During that time Rimouski participated in RCN operations as part of Operation Pointe Maisonnette, the Canadian military's counter-offensive to the German military's Operation Kiebitz. Operation Kiebitz was a plan by the Kriegsmarine to have several senior naval officers (including Otto Kretschmer and Wolfgang Heyda) attempt to escape from the Camp 30 prisoner of war camp at Bowmanville, Ontario to rendezvous for a planned extraction by U-536 off Pointe de Maisonnette, New Brunswick on 26–27 September 1943.

Canadian military intelligence and police intercepted and decoded the encrypted Kriegsmarine instructions to its prisoners at Camp 30 and the RCN planned a response centred on an anti-submarine task force that would be hidden near the extraction point. Rimouski was outfitted with an experimental version of diffused lighting camouflage for the operation. Military guards were aware of the tunnelling efforts at Camp 30 but deliberately (and covertly) allowed them to proceed so as to not tip off the Kriegsmarine. Incidentally, Wolfgang Heyda did escape, however not by the tunnel as he used a zip wire on electrical cables to carry him outside the camp fence. He made his way by Canadian National Railways passenger trains to northern New Brunswick only to be apprehended by RCN and Canadian Army personnel on shore at the Pointe de Maisonnette lighthouse.

U-536 lurked offshore for the coded light signal from the escapees and the RCN personnel attempted to replicate what the escapees would have done, however the submarine detected the presence of the RCN task force led by Rimouski and remained submerged and evaded attack or capture, without successfully carrying the prisoners, but was sunk the following month by the Canadian frigate Nene and corvette Snowberry on 19 November 1943 while she was attacking Convoy SL 139/MKS 30.

In December 1943, Rimouski transferred to MOEF escort group C-3. In April 1944, Rimouski joined Western Approaches Command after being allotted for invasion duties. She was one of 57 RCN warships that participated in Operation Neptune, the code name for the Normandy Landings as part of D-Day (Operation Overlord). On 31 May, she departed Oban to escort the blockships that were part of the constructed bridgehead on the beaches of Normandy. She remained in the English Channel escorting invasion convoys until August, when she returned to Canada.

Upon her return to Canada, Rimouski briefly served as a training ship at Halifax, before undergoing her second major refit. After workups, she returned to the United Kingdom as a member of escort group EG 41 based in Plymouth. She spent the rest of the war as part of that unit.

A common tradition of painting a mascot on a naval ship's gun shields, Rimouski featured a boisterous cowboy with a 10-gallon hat lassoing a U-boat from the back of his steed.

Rimouski was paid off on 24 July 1945 at Sorel, Quebec. She was sold for scrapping and broken up in December 1950 at Hamilton, Ontario.
