= HMCS Edmundston =

Flower-class corvette

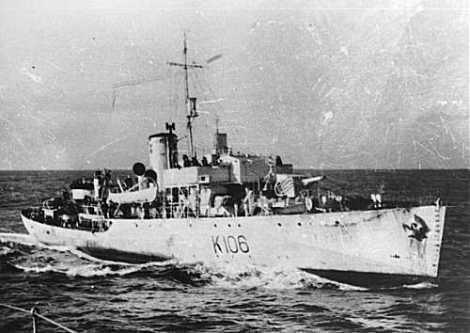
- HMCS Edmundston

History

Canada
- Name: Edmundston
- Namesake: Edmundston, New Brunswick
- Ordered: 14 February 1940
- Builder: Yarrows Ltd., Esquimalt
- Laid down: 23 August 1940
- Launched: 22 February 1941
- Commissioned: 21 October 1941
- Out of service: 16 June 1945
- Identification: Pennant number: K106
- Honours and awards: Atlantic 1942–45, Biscay 1943-44
- Fate: Sold for mercantile use. Scrapped 1961

General characteristics
- Class & type: Flower-class corvette (original)
- Displacement: 925 long tons (940 t; 1,036 short tons)
- Length: 205 ft (62.48 m)o/a
- Beam: 33 ft (10.06 m)
- Draught: 11.5 ft (3.51 m)
- Installed power: 2,750 ihp (2,050 kW)
- Propulsion: Single shaft; 2 × fire tube Scotch boilers; 1 × 4-cylinder triple-expansion reciprocating steam engine
- Speed: 16 knots (29.6 km/h)
- Range: 3,500 nautical miles (6,482 km) at 12 knots (22.2 km/h)
- Complement: 85
- Sensors & processing systems: 1 × SW1C or 2C radar; 1 × Type 123A or Type 127DV sonar
- Armament: 1 × BL 4-inch (101.6 mm) Mk.IX single gun; 2 × twin .50 cal machine guns; 2 × twin Lewis .303 cal machine guns; 2 × Mk.II depth charge throwers; 2 × depth charge rails with 40 depth charges; Originally fitted with minesweeping gear, later removed

HMCS Edmundston was a Flower-class corvette that served with the Royal Canadian Navy during the Second World War. She served primarily in the Battle of the Atlantic as a convoy escort. She was named for Edmundston, New Brunswick.

== Background ==
Flower-class corvettes like Edmundston serving with the Royal Canadian Navy during the Second World War were different from earlier and more traditional sail-driven corvettes. The "corvette" designation was created by the French for classes of small warships; the Royal Navy borrowed the term for a period but discontinued its use in 1877. During the hurried preparations for war in the late 1930s, Winston Churchill reactivated the corvette class, needing a name for smaller ships used in an escort capacity, in this case based on a whaling ship design. The generic name "flower" was used to designate the class of these ships, which – in the Royal Navy – were named after flowering plants.

Corvettes commissioned by the Royal Canadian Navy during the Second World War were named after communities for the most part, to better represent the people who took part in building them. This idea was put forth by Admiral Percy W. Nelles. Sponsors were commonly associated with the community for which the ship was named. Royal Navy corvettes were designed as open sea escorts, while Canadian corvettes were developed for coastal auxiliary roles which was exemplified by their minesweeping gear. Eventually the Canadian corvettes would be modified to allow them to perform better on the open seas.

== Construction ==
Edmundston was ordered on 14 February 1940 as part of the 1939–1940 Flower-class building program. She was laid down 23 August 1940 by Yarrows Ltd. at Esquimalt, British Columbia and launched 22 February 1941. Edmundston was commissioned at Esquimalt on 21 October 1941.

During her career, Edmundston underwent two significant refits. The first took place beginning in January 1943 at Halifax, Nova Scotia where her fo'c'sle was extended. The refit was finished in May 1943. The second major refit was done at Liverpool, Nova Scotia from May to July 1944.

== War service ==
After workups, Edmundston was assigned to Esquimalt Force. The Japanese submarine I-26 sank the American cargo ship SS Coast Trader 35 nautical miles (65 km; 40 mi) southwest of Cape Flattery, Washington on 7 June 1942, and over the next two days Edmundston and the fishing schooner Virginia I rescued all but one of her survivors. On 20 June 1942, Edmundston rescued 31 crew of SS Fort Camosun, which had been torpedoed off Cape Flattery by the Japanese submarine I-25. Fort Camosun herself was towed into Victoria Harbour by HMCS Quesnel.

On 13 September 1942, Edmundston was reassigned to the Atlantic. She arrived at Halifax in October. Upon arrival she was assigned to the Western Local Escort Force. After workups following her first major refit, she joined the Royal Navy-controlled escort group EG 5, which protected convoys in the Atlantic and on routes to and from Gibraltar and Sierra Leone. She spent the next ten months as an ocean escort.

On 25 August 1943 EG 5, consisting of the British frigates Nene and Tweed and the Canadian corvettes Calgary, Snowberry and Edmundston were sent to relieve the 40th Escort Group which had been deployed on a U-boat hunt off Cape Ortegal. While this was in progress the ships were attacked at 14:15 by 14 Dornier Do 217s and 7 Junkers Ju 88s with the new German glide bomb weapon, the Henschel Hs293 A-1. The sloops Landguard and Bideford, who were part of the 40th Escort Group, were the first of the Allied and Royal Navy ships to be attacked and damaged by them. Several sailors were injured in Bideford and one sailor was killed. Two days later the force sent to relieve Edmundston's group was also attacked and suffered losses.

After her second refit and workups in Bermuda, she joined Mid-Ocean Escort Force escort group C-8 in August 1944. She served with this group until the end of the war.

== Post-war service ==
Edmundston was paid off at Sorel, Quebec on 16 June 1945. She was sold for mercantile use in 1948 and converted to a cargo ship of 939 GRT. Under the new name Amepala she was last on Lloyd's Register in 1961–62. The ship was broken up in 1961.
