= Wolfgang Heyda =

German U-boat commander during World War II

- Born: 14 November 1913; Arys, East Prussia
- Died: 21 August 1947 (aged 33); Kiel, Germany
- Military career
- Allegiance: Nazi Germany
- Branch: Kriegsmarine
- Service years: 1932–1945
- Rank: Korvettenkapitän
- Units: Köln; Admiral Scheer
- Commands: U-120; U-434
- Conflicts: World War II • Battle of the Atlantic

Wolfgang Heyda (14 November 1913 – 21 August 1947) was a German U-boat commander during World War II.

== War service ==
Heyda entered the Navy in 1932, serving aboard the cruiser Köln and studying at Mürwik Naval School, before joining the pocket battleship Admiral Scheer at the start of the war.

From 26 November 1940 to 19 May 1941 Heyda commanded U-120, part of the 21st U-boat Flotilla, for his U-boat commander training, then took command of U-434 on 21 June 1941, beginning his first war patrol on 11 November. Near Gibraltar Heyda's U-boat was involved in attacking convoy HG 76 which was heading to Liverpool. At dawn on 18 December U-434 was sighted by the convoy's destroyers north of Madeira, in position 36°15′N 15°48′W and attacked with depth charges. U-434 was forced to the surface and then rammed by the destroyer HMS Blankney and sunk. Two members of U-434's crew were killed and 42 were taken prisoner.

Commander Frederic John Walker, CB, DSO, commander of the 36th Escort Group sank four U-boats on his first war patrol, including U-434. Heyda was eventually sent to the Bowmanville POW camp in Ontario, near Toronto, Canada.

== Prisoner of war and escape attempt ==
At Bowmanville in October 1942 an insurrection of the prisoners protesting their being shackled took place for three days. The insurrection became known as the Battle of Bowmanville. Commander Otto Kretschmer was instrumental in the rebellion, having assaulted a Canadian guard and taken him prisoner.

Operation Kiebitz, a plan to have Otto Kretschmer, Horst Elfe, Hans Ey and Hans Joachim Knebel-Döberitz escape and be picked up by a U-boat, was developed in 1942 and was to be executed in September 1943. Knebel-Döberitz was the former adjutant of Admiral Karl Dönitz. The successful escape of Kretschmer, a top U-boat ace, would be a major propaganda coup for the Germans. However, their escape plan was foiled, but Heyda made an escape via electric wires over a barbed wire fence. He then traveled 1,400 kilometres (870 mi) to Pointe de Maisonnette, New Brunswick on Chaleur Bay where he was to be picked up by a U-boat.

Police forces in Canada and the United States started a manhunt for the escaped POW. Heyda was captured on the beach at Pointe de Maisonnette where Canadian Army and Royal Canadian Navy (RCN) were waiting for the U-boat to surface off-shore (the RCN had a substantial anti-submarine task force led by HMCS Rimouski hidden nearby). Heyda was taken to the Pointe de Maisonnette lighthouse where Lieutenant Commander Desmond Piers of the Royal Canadian Navy commanded the operation. There, Piers confronted Heyda who claimed to be a tourist on vacation. Depth charges were heard in the bay, but the commander of U-536, Kapitänleutnant Rolf Schauenburg, evaded the attacking ships and made it safely into the Atlantic, only to be sunk six weeks later by ships of RN and RCN.

== Death ==
Heyda was returned to Camp 30, and was eventually released in May 1947. He died of polio in the Kiel University health clinic just three months later on 21 August 1947.

== Bibliography ==
- Busch, Rainer; Röll, Hans-Joachim (1999). German U-boat commanders of World War II : a biographical dictionary. Translated by Brooks, Geoffrey. London, Annapolis, Md: Greenhill Books, Naval Institute Press. ISBN 1-55750-186-6.
