= HMCS Calgary (K231) =

Canadian World War II Flower-class corvette

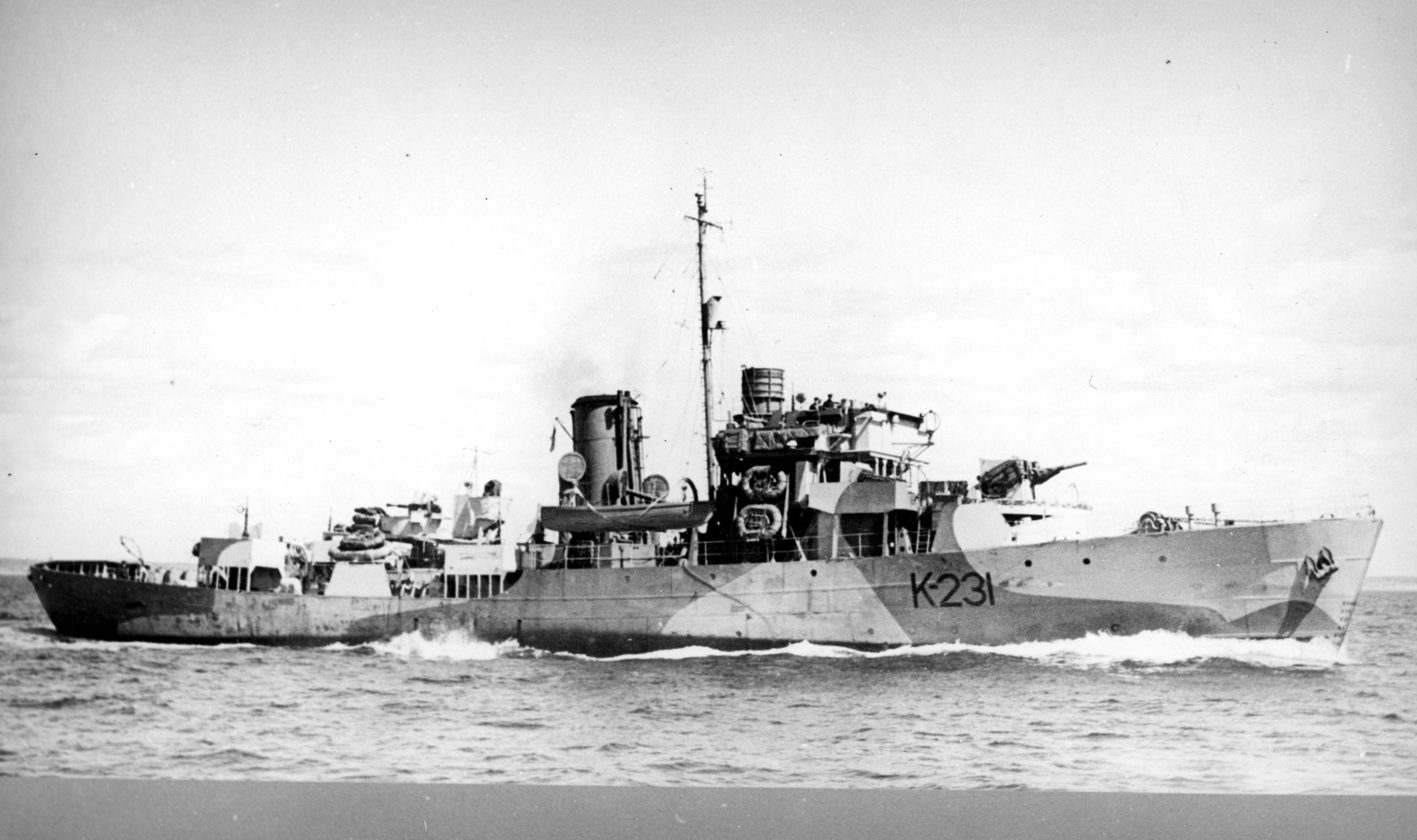
- HMCS Calgary

History

Canada
- Name: Calgary
- Namesake: Calgary
- Ordered: 20 February 1941
- Builder: Marine Industries. Ltd., Sorel, Quebec
- Laid down: 22 March 1941
- Launched: 23 August 1941
- Commissioned: 16 December 1941
- Decommissioned: 19 June 1945
- Identification: Pennant number: K231
- Honours and awards: Atlantic 1942–45, Biscay 1943, Normandy 1944, English Channel 1944–45, North Sea 1945
- Fate: Scrapped 1951 at Hamilton, Ontario

General characteristics
- Class & type: Flower-class corvette (Revised)
- Displacement: 1,015 long tons (1,031 t) standard
- Length: 208 ft 4 in (63.50 m) o/a
- Beam: 33 ft 1 in (10.08 m)
- Draught: 13 ft 6 in (4.11 m)
- Propulsion: Single shaft; 2 × water tube boilers; 1 × triple expansion engine; 2,800 ihp (2,100 kW)
- Speed: 16 knots (30 km/h; 18 mph)
- Range: 3,450 nmi (6,390 km; 3,970 mi) at 12 knots (22 km/h; 14 mph)
- Complement: 109
- Sensors & processing systems: 1 × SW1C or 2C radar; 1 × Type 123A or Type 127DV sonar
- Armament: 1 × BL 4 in (102 mm) Mk.IX gun; 1 × twin .50 cal machine guns; 1 × twin Lewis .303 cal machine guns; 2 × Mk.II depth charge throwers; 2 × depth charge rails with 40 depth charges

HMCS Calgary was a Royal Canadian Navy revised Flower-class corvette which took part in convoy escort duties during the Second World War. Launched on 23 August 1941, she was named for Calgary, Alberta. The ship was commissioned into the Royal Canadian Navy on 16 December 1941 and began operations in the Battle of the Atlantic. In 1943, Calgary took part in the sinking of the German submarine U-536 north of the Azores in the Atlantic Ocean. The corvette also took part in Operation Neptune, the naval component of the Allied invasion of Normandy in June 1944. Decommissioned on 19 June 1945, the ship was sold for scrap later that year and broken up in 1951 at Hamilton, Ontario.

== Design and description ==
Flower-class corvettes such as Calgary serving with the Royal Canadian Navy (RCN) in the Second World War were different from earlier and more traditional sail-driven corvettes. The Flower-class corvettes originated from a need that arose in 1938 to expand the Royal Navy following the Munich Crisis. A design request went out for a small escort for coastal convoys. Based on a traditional whaler-type design, the initial plans for Canadian ships were augmented after the first building programme vessels saw action at sea. No longer used just for coastal protection operations, the Flower class were being used for transatlantic escort and required larger crews and better seakeeping qualities. As such, the new revised Flower-class design had an extended forecastle to make space for the larger crews, larger bilge keels to reduce rolling, more sheer and flare to the hull to improve seaworthiness and bridge one deck higher for better views over the main gun forward. The revised version of the Flower class had a standard displacement of 1,015 long tons (1,031 t). They were 208 feet 4 inches (63.50 m) long overall, with a beam of 33 feet 1 inch (10.08 m) and a maximum draught of 13 feet 6 inches (4.11 m) at full load. The revised 1940–1941 corvettes were propelled by a four-cylinder vertical triple expansion engine powered by steam from two water-tube boilers turning one three-bladed propeller rated at 2,800 indicated horsepower (2,100 kW). The corvettes had a maximum speed of 16 knots (30 km/h; 18 mph). This gave them a range of 3,450 nautical miles (6,390 km; 3,970 mi) at 12 knots (22 km/h; 14 mph). The vessels were extremely wet.

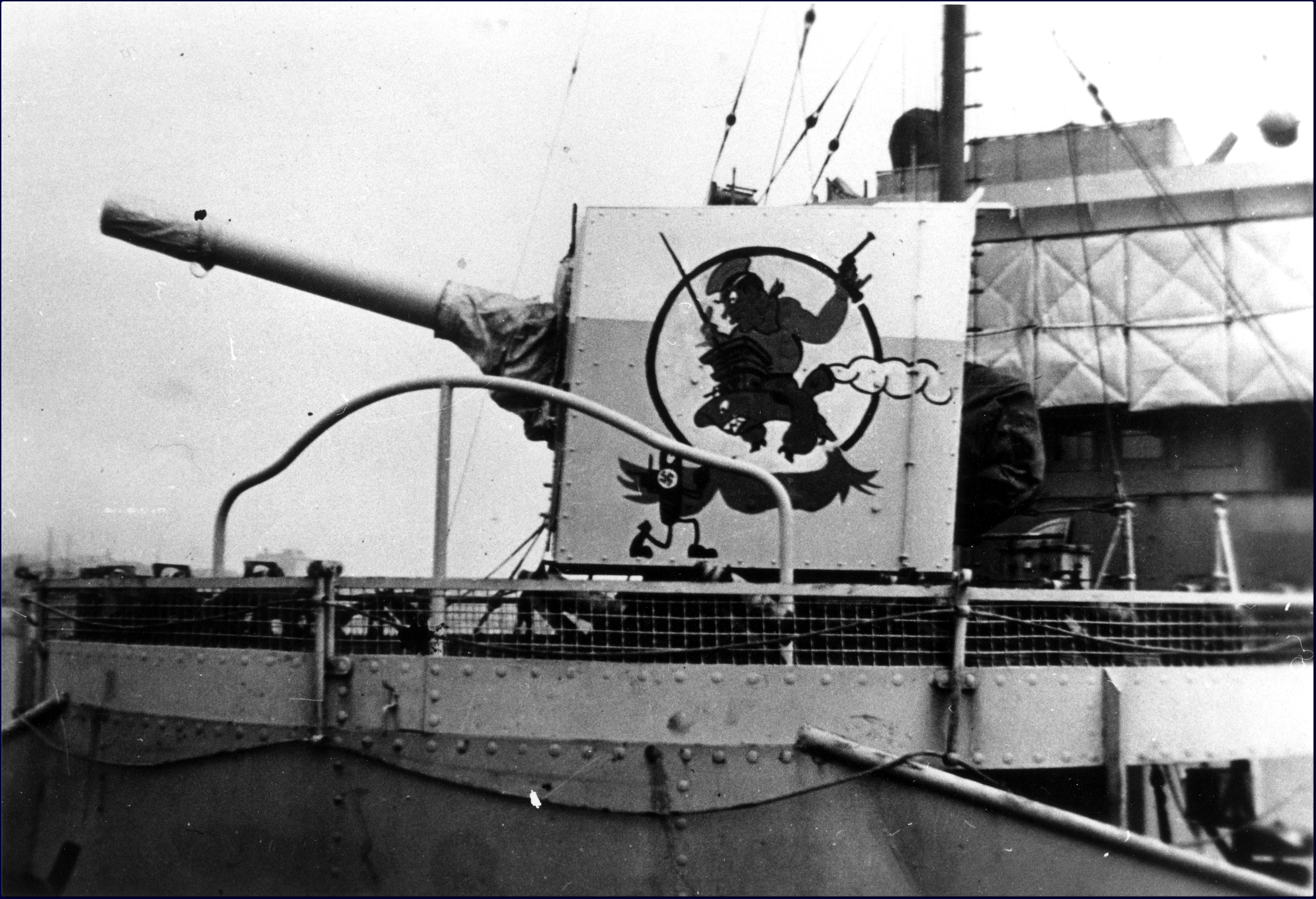
Four-inch gun on Calgary

The Canadian Flower-class vessels were initially armed with a Mk IX BL 4-inch (102 mm) gun forward on a CP 1 mounting and carried 100 rounds per gun. The corvettes were also armed with a QF Vickers 2-pounder (40 mm, 1.6 in) gun on a bandstand aft, two single-mounted .303 Vickers machine guns or Browning 0.5-calibre machine guns for anti-aircraft (AA) defence and two twin-mounted .303 Lewis machine guns, usually sited on bridge wings. For anti-submarine warfare, they mounted two Mk II depth charge throwers and initially carried 25 depth charges, though as the war went on, the number increased to nearly 100. The revised corvettes were designed with a Type 123 ASDIC sonar set installed. The revised Flower-class ships had a complement of six officers and 79 ratings.

=== Modifications ===
The design underwent further modifications and upgrades. A wireless direction finding set was installed and they were first fitted with basic SW-1 and SW-2 CQ surface warning radar, notable for their fishbone-like antenna and reputation for failure in poor weather or in the dark. The improved Type 271 radar was placed aft, with some units receiving Type 291 radar for air search. The enlarged bridge, which had given extra room to operators of the .303 Vickers AA guns, allowed for the installation of Oerlikon 20 mm (0.8 in) cannon, replacing the Browning and Vickers machine guns. Up to six additional 20 mm cannon were added, placed in sites all over the ship, mostly on the engine room casing. Some of the corvettes were rearmed with Hedgehog anti-submarine mortars and the Type 145 sonar that operated it. The complements of the ships grew throughout the war rising from the initial 47 to as many as 104.

== Construction and career ==
The corvette was ordered 20 February 1941 as part of the Revised 1940–41 Flower class building programme. The ship was laid down by Marine Industries Ltd. at Sorel, Quebec, on 22 March 1941 and launched on 23 August of that year. Named for the city in Alberta, Calgary was commissioned into the RCN on 16 December 1941 at Sorel with the pennant number K231. After arriving at Halifax, Nova Scotia on 28 December 1941, she was initially assigned to the Western Local Escort Force (WLEF). In July, the corvette was transferred to Halifax Force and assigned to Aruba tanker convoys. On 23 July, convoy ON 113 comprising 33 merchants ships was attacked by the German wolfpack "Wolf" composed of nine U-boats. For the next three days the convoy's escorts fought the wolfpack. Beginning on 26 July, the escorts were relieved by WLEF escort group W 7, composed of the destroyers HMS Walker and HMCS Columbia and the corvettes Calgary and HMCS Chicoutimi. W 7 escorted the convoy safely out of the wolfpack's attack area, but encountered the German submarine U-132 off Sable Island. The submarine fired her last two torpedoes which struck the 6,734 GRT freighter Pacific Pioneer. The submarine dived to avoid the sinking ship, getting stuck in the mud on the bottom. Calgary found the submarine and began dropping depth charges on U-132. The submarine survived the onslaught, but was damaged and had to return to port. The rest of the convoy escaped unscathed. In November 1942 Calgary sailed with convoy SC 106 to the United Kingdom, where the vessel was re-assigned to the British Western Approaches Command (WAC) as a support vessel for Operation Torch, the amphibious invasion of French North Africa as part of the North African campaign. Based at Londonderry, Calgary was assigned to Canadian Escort Group 27 (CEG 27). The corvette sailed for the Mediterranean Sea on 11 December as an escort to the KMS 5 convoy bound for Gibraltar. After arriving, WAC requested the return of nine sloops and in exchange, CEG 27 was assigned to the Gibraltar Escort Force in January 1943. However, Calgary returned to the United Kingdom after developing severe mechanical problems which led to an extensive refit at Cardiff, Wales. Calgary returned to Canada with convoy ON 179 in April.

Calgary rejoined WLEF in April 1943. In May 1943, during an Allied conference on the transatlantic convoys, the RCN decided to create a Canadian escort group tasked specifically with hunting submarines based at St. John's to support the other convoy escort groups. Designated escort group 5, though also known as the 5th Support Group (5th SG), the unit replaced a recently disbanded British group under WAC. The unit was initially stocked with older corvettes, but as the revised and refitted corvettes became available, they joined the group, among them Calgary. In August, the unit was transferred to WAC and used for naval sweeps along the northwestern coast of Spain. On 23 August 1943 Calgary, as part of the 5th Support Group, was deployed to relieve the 40th Escort Group which was undertaking a U-boat hunt off Cape Ortegal. The warships of both groups were first shadowed by German Focke-Wulf Fw 200 Condor aircraft of Kampfgeschwader 40, but they did not attack. After receiving a report from a passing Allied Consolidated B-24 Liberator aircraft, that a mass of German aircraft were in the vicinity, they were shortly thereafter attacked by 14 Dornier Do 217 and 7 Junkers Ju 88 aircraft that were carrying a new weapon, the Henschel Hs 293 anti-ship guided missile. Going as fast as they could, only two British ships suffered damage from the missiles with Calgary escaping unscathed. In November, the Germans moved the majority of their U-boats along the Gibraltar–United Kingdom convoy route as the North Atlantic had become too dangerous for them after the arrival of better escorts and technology among Allied forces. While escorting the convoy SL 139/MKS 30, 5th EG was among the units sent to support the escort as the wolfpack "Schill" comprising 31 U-boats in three lines had formed to oppose it. In the following 78-hour battle, the U-boats struck first, blowing the bow off one of the British escorts and shooting down one of the covering aircraft. However, on 20 November 1943, Calgary, along with HMS Nene and HMCS Snowberry, depth charged and sank U-536 northeast of the Azores. The corvette departed for a refit at Liverpool, Nova Scotia, in January 1944.

In May 1944, Calgary, after completing workups was ordered to the United Kingdom and in June 1944 was deployed to assist in Operation Neptune, the amphibious invasion of Normandy, France. In September 1944, she was reassigned to Nore Command and remained with them for the remained of the war. While escorting the convoy TBC 21, travelling from the River Thames to Bristol Channel on 29 December 1944 Calgary depth charged German submarine U-772 and damaged the submarine that attacked the convoy in the English Channel south of Weymouth. Though the submarine escaped, it was sunk the next night while on the surface by British aircraft. Calgary returned to Canada in May 1945 and was paid off from the RCN on 19 June 1945 at Sorel. She was sold for scrap on 30 August 1946 and broken up in 1951 at Hamilton, Ontario. For service in the Second World War, the vessel was awarded the battle honours "Atlantic 1942–45", "Biscay 1943", "Normandy 1944", "English Channel 1944–45", and "North Sea 1945".
