= Swift Current (disambiguation) =

Swift Current is a city in Saskatchewan, Canada.

Swift Current may also refer to:

== Places ==
- Swift Current, Newfoundland and Labrador
- Swift Current No. 137, Saskatchewan, a rural municipality
- Swift Current (provincial electoral district), a provincial electoral district
- Swift Current Creek, Saskatchewan.
- Swift Current, a Mennonite colony in Mexico, see Mennonites in Mexico
- Swift Current, a Mennonite colony in Bolivia, see Mennonites in Bolivia

== Other uses ==
- HMCS Swift Current, a Royal Canadian Navy minesweeper
