= P127 =

P127 may refer to:

- Papyrus 127, a biblical manuscript
- TCG Bozcaada (P-127), a patrol boat of the Turkish Navy
- P127, a state regional road in Latvia
