= K156 =

K156 or K-156 may refer to:

- K-156 (Kansas highway), a state highway in Kansas
- HMCS Chicoutimi (K156), a former Canadian Navy ship
