= HMCS Swift Current =

History

Canada
- Name: Swift Current
- Namesake: Swift Current, Saskatchewan
- Builder: Canadian Vickers Ltd., Montreal
- Laid down: 10 January 1941
- Launched: 29 May 1941
- Commissioned: 11 November 1941
- Decommissioned: 23 October 1945
- Identification: Pennant number: J254
- Honours and awards: Gulf of St. Lawrence 1942
- Fate: Transferred to Turkish Navy 1958

Turkey
- Name: Bozcaada
- Acquired: 29 March 1958
- Fate: Discarded 1971

General characteristics
- Class & type: Bangor-class minesweeper
- Displacement: 672 long tons (683 t)
- Length: 180 ft (54.9 m) oa
- Beam: 28 ft 6 in (8.7 m)
- Draught: 9 ft 9 in (3.0 m)
- Propulsion: 2 Admiralty 3-drum water tube boilers, 2 shafts, vertical triple-expansion reciprocating engines, 2,400 ihp (1,790 kW)
- Speed: 16.5 knots (31 km/h)
- Complement: 83
- Armament: 1 × QF 3-inch (76 mm) 20 cwt gun; 1 x QF 2 pdr Mark VIII; 2 × QF 20 mm Oerlikon guns; 40 depth charges as escort

HMCS Swift Current (pennant J254) was a Bangor-class minesweeper that served with the Royal Canadian Navy during the Second World War. Entering service in 1941, the warship used as a training ship and convoy escort and took part in the battles of the St. Lawrence and the Atlantic. Following the war the ship was laid up until reacquired during the Korean War. Never re-entering service with Canada, Swift Current was sold to the Turkish Navy in 1958. Renamed Bozcaada, the minesweeper was discarded in 1971.

== Design and description ==
A British design, the Bangor-class minesweepers were smaller than the preceding Halcyon-class minesweepers in British service, but larger than the Fundy class in Canadian service. They came in two versions powered by different engines; those with a diesel engines and those with vertical triple-expansion steam engines. Swift Current was of the latter design and was larger than her diesel-engined cousins. The minesweeper was 180 feet (54.9 m) long overall, had a beam of 28 feet 6 inches (8.7 m) and a draught of 9 feet 9 inches (3.0 m). Swift Current had a displacement of 672 long tons (683 t). She had a complement of 6 officers and 77 enlisted.

Swift Current had two vertical triple-expansion steam engines, each driving one shaft, using steam provided by two Admiralty three-drum boilers. The engines produced a total of 2,400 indicated horsepower (1,800 kW) and gave a maximum speed of 16.5 knots (30.6 km/h; 19.0 mph). The minesweeper could carry a maximum of 150 long tons (152 t) of fuel oil.

The minesweeper was armed with a single quick-firing (QF) 3-inch (76 mm) 20 cwt gun mounted forward. (Note: "Cwt" is the abbreviation for hundredweight, 20 cwt referring to the weight of the gun.) The ship was also fitted with a QF 2-pounder Mark VIII aft and were eventually fitted with single-mounted QF 20 mm Oerlikon guns on the bridge wings. Those ships assigned to convoy duty were armed with two depth charge launchers and four chutes to deploy their 40 depth charges. Swift Current was equipped with SA and LL minesweeping gear for the detection of acoustic and magnetic naval mines.

== Operational history ==
The minesweeper was ordered as part of the 1940–1941 construction programme. The ship's keel was laid down on 10 January 1941 by Canadian Vickers Ltd at their yard in Montreal, Quebec. Named for a community in Saskatchewan, Swift Current was launched on 29 May 1941. The ship was commissioned on 11 November 1941 at Montreal.

Arriving at Halifax, Nova Scotia on 24 November, the vessel was used as an anti-submarine warfare (ASW) training ship there until May 1942. That month, Swift Current sailed to Pictou, Nova Scotia to resume ASW training duties there. In February 1943, the minesweeper was sent back to Halifax to join Halifax Force, the patrol and escort unit based there. She remained as part of that unit until June when Swift Current joined Gaspé Force as a convoy escort in the Battle of the St. Lawrence. In September 1943, Swift Current was among the warships deployed as part of the Canadian force to break up Operation Kiebitz, the German plan to breakout prisoner of war U-boat captains from a camp in Canada. Swift Current was among those sent to intercept the U-boat U-536 as it entered Chaleur Bay to rescue the prisoners. The submarine sighted the warships before entering the harbour and broke off the attempt before it could be intercepted.

In November 1943, the minesweeper returned to Halifax Force and remained with the unit until undergoing a refit at Lunenburg, Nova Scotia in February 1944. Following the completion of the refit, Swift Current was transferred to Newfoundland Force, the patrol and escort force based in St. John's, Newfoundland and remained with that group until June 1945. From June until October, the warship performed miscellaneous duties along the Atlantic coast of Canada.

Swift Current was paid off on 23 October 1945 at Sydney, Nova Scotia and laid up at Shelburne, Nova Scotia. In 1946, the minesweeper was taken to Sorel, Quebec and placed in strategic reserve. Reacquired by the Royal Canadian Navy in 1951 during the Korean War, the vessel was given the new hull number FSE 185 and re-designated a coastal escort. The warship never re-entered service and was sold to the Turkish Navy on 29 March 1958. Renamed Bozcaada, the ship remained in service until 1971 when the ship was broken up for scrap in Turkey.
