= HMCS Quesnel =

Flower-class corvette

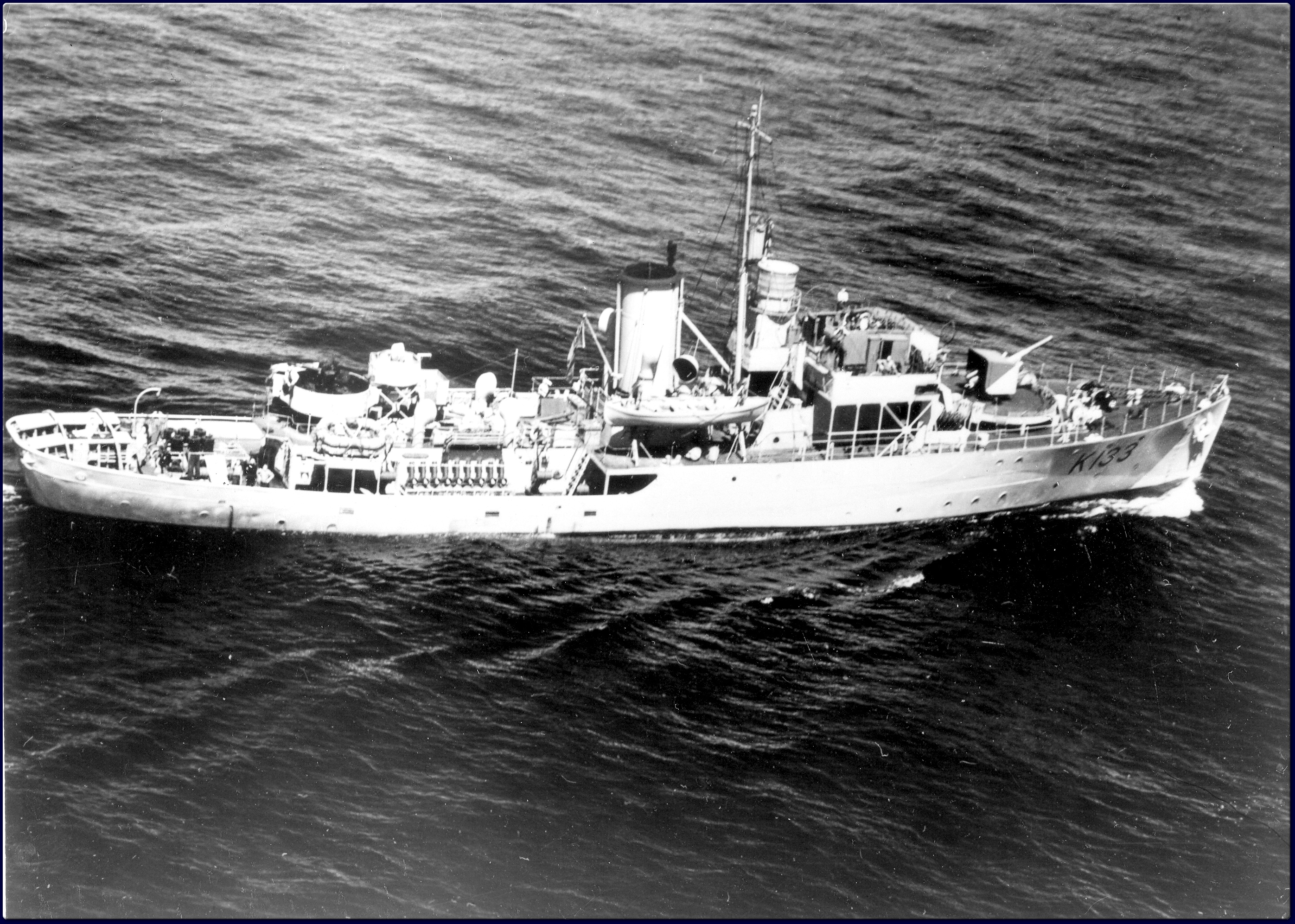
- HMCS Quesnel, 10 September 1942, off Vancouver Island

History

Canada
- Name: Quesnel
- Namesake: Quesnel, British Columbia
- Ordered: 14 February 1940
- Builder: Victoria Machinery Depot Co. Ltd., Victoria
- Laid down: 9 May 1940
- Launched: 12 November 1940
- Commissioned: 23 May 1941
- Decommissioned: 3 July 1945
- Identification: Pennant number: K133
- Honours and awards: Atlantic 1942-45; Gulf of St. Lawrence 1944
- Fate: Scrapped 1946.

General characteristics
- Class & type: Flower-class corvette (original)
- Displacement: 925 long tons (940 t; 1,036 short tons)
- Length: 205 ft (62.48 m)o/a
- Beam: 33 ft (10.06 m)
- Draught: 11.5 ft (3.51 m)
- Propulsion: single shaft; 2 × fire tube Scotch boilers; 1 × 4-cycle triple-expansion reciprocating steam engine; 2,750 ihp (2,050 kW)
- Speed: 16 knots (29.6 km/h)(18.4mph)
- Range: 3,500 nautical miles (6,482 km) at 12 knots (22.2 km/h)(13.8mph)
- Complement: 85
- Sensors & processing systems: 1 × SW1C or 2C radar; 1 × Type 123A or Type 127DV sonar
- Armament: 1 × BL 4 in (102 mm) Mk.IX gun; 2 × .50 cal machine gun (twin); 2 × Lewis .303 cal machine gun (twin); 2 × Mk.II depth charge throwers; 2 × depth charge rails with 40 depth charges

HMCS Quesnel was a Flower-class corvette of the Royal Canadian Navy that took part in convoy escort duties during the Second World War. She primarily saw service in the Battle of the Atlantic. She was named after Quesnel, British Columbia.

== Background ==
Flower-class corvettes like Quesnel serving with the Royal Canadian Navy during the Second World War were different from earlier and more traditional sail-driven corvettes. The "corvette" designation was created by the French for classes of small warships; the Royal Navy borrowed the term for a period but discontinued its use in 1877. During the hurried preparations for war in the late 1930s, Winston Churchill reactivated the corvette class, needing a name for smaller ships used in an escort capacity, in this case based on a whaling ship design. The generic name "flower" was used to designate the class of these ships, which – in the Royal Navy – were named after flowering plants.

Corvettes commissioned by the Royal Canadian Navy during the Second World War were named after communities for the most part, to better represent the people who took part in building them. This idea was put forth by Admiral Percy W. Nelles. Sponsors were commonly associated with the community for which the ship was named. Royal Navy corvettes were designed as open sea escorts, while Canadian corvettes were developed for coastal auxiliary roles which was exemplified by their minesweeping gear. Eventually the Canadian corvettes would be modified to allow them to perform better on the open seas.

== Construction ==
Quesnel was originally ordered by the Royal Navy 4 February 1940 as part of the 1939-1940 Flower-class building program. She was laid down by the Victoria Machinery Depot Company Ltd. in Victoria, British Columbia on 9 May 1940 and launched 12 November 1940. She was commissioned on 23 May 1941, at Esquimalt.

On 15 May 1941 Quesnel was one of ten corvettes loaned to Canada. She could be told apart from other Canadian Flower-class corvettes by her lack of minesweeping gear and the siting of the after gun tub amidships. However, Quesnel was completed after the exchange, so she was commissioned with a Canadian name and not a flower name like the other nine that had been transferred.

== Wartime service ==
Upon commissioning, Quesnel patrolled the Pacific Coast as a member of Esquimalt Force. During the spring of 1942 she was doing anti-submarine patrols in the Straits of Georgia, the Queen Charlotte Sounds and Millbank Sounds. It was during this time that she was detailed to screen RMS Queen Elizabeth while she was waiting to go into drydock.

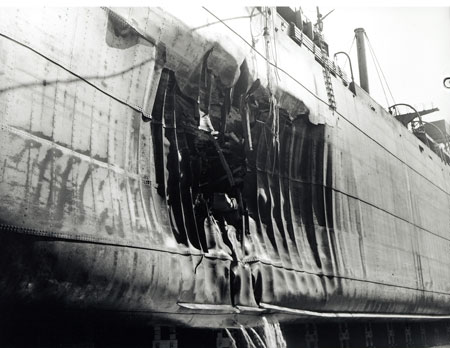
Torpedo explosion damage to port lower side of hull of SS Fort Camosun

On 20 June 1942, the Imperial Japanese Navy submarine I-26 shelled the lighthouse at Estevan Point on Vancouver Island, while I-25, under the command of Commander Akiji Tagami, torpedoed and shelled the freighter SS Fort Camosun off Cape Flattery. The freighter did not sink and she was towed to safety by Quesnel into Victoria Harbour.

Quesnel left Esquimalt on 13 September 1942, with four other corvettes headed for Panama and the Atlantic. Transferred to the east coast to replace a ship taking part in Operation Torch, Quesnel arrived at Halifax on 13 October 1942, and was assigned to the Western Local Escort Force (WLEF). With the division of the force into escort groups in June 1943, she became a member of EG W-1. During this period she underwent a refit, including fo’c's’le extension, from early September to 23 December 1943, at Pictou, Nova Scotia. This refit was followed by workups in St. Margaret's Bay, Nova Scotia and Bermuda.

On 12 May 1944, she picked up 17 crew members from the damaged SS Esso Pittsburgh. Quesnel later joined the Quebec Force in the St. Lawrence River on 10 June 1944, and was tasked with escorting Labrador-Quebec convoys through the ice fields in the Straits of Belle Isle.

In November 1944 she was transferred to Halifax Force, going to Sydney, Nova Scotia for refit and, on completion late in January 1945, to Bermuda for workups. She resumed escort duty late in March 1945, temporarily attached to EG W-5 and W-8 of the WLEF until the end of the war.

She brought her last convoy to Halifax in July 1945 and was decommissioned on 3 July 1945. She was the only one of the ten corvettes transferred from the Royal Navy who was not returned. The after-war use of the ship is not entirely clear. One account says she was sold on 5 October 1945, to the United Steel and Metal Company in Hamilton, Ontario for scrapping and finally broken up at Hamilton in 1946. However, an article in the Kingston Whig-Standard 10 May 1949 clearly shows the ship being towed to Kingston after serving for several years as an auxiliary steam plant for Beaver Board Co or Ontario Paper Co in Thorold Ontario. Additional articles referenced show the boiler being removed in Kingston and later being sold to Dofasco in Hamilton for recycling into food safety cans by American Can Co.

== Thunderbird ==
During the summer of 1942, while coming through Hecate Strait in the Queen Charlottes, Quesnel sheltered from a storm in Alert Bay, British Columbia. While ashore, some crew members removed a carved Thunderbird from a local burial ground. The grave marker was for a man named Michael Dutch, from the Kwakwaka'wakw First Nation who died circa 1922. The crew members considered the totem a lucky talisman and had it depicted on the ship's badge. There are persistent rumours that the Thunderbird totem still exists and in 2007 some of the Quesnel's former sailors issued a public plea for its return.

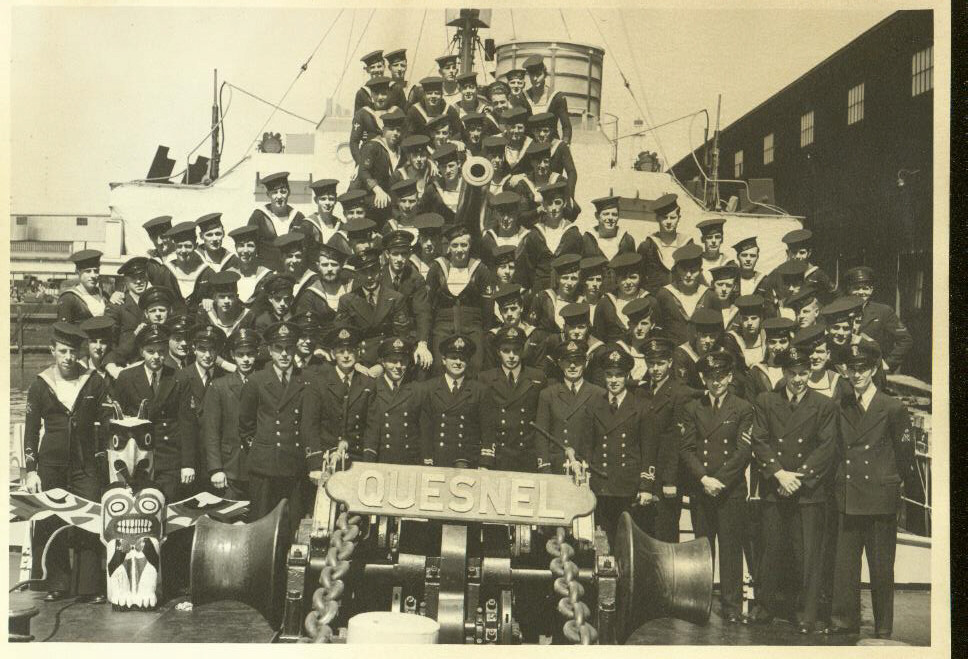
HMCS Quesnel crew with Thunderbird

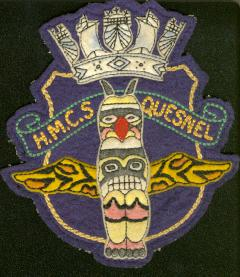
Badge of HMCS Quesnel
