= Pointe de Maisonnette (New Brunswick) =

Maisonnette Point Lighthouse
- Location: Pointe de Maisonnette, New Brunswick, Canada
- Coordinates: 47°50′15″N 65°00′13″W

Tower
- Constructed: 1915 (first)
- Foundation: concrete base
- Construction: metal skeletal tower
- Height: 13 m (43 ft)
- Shape: square pyramidal skeletal tower with balcony and lantern
- Power source: solar power
- Operator: Canadian Coast Guard

Light
- Focal height: 18 m (59 ft)
- Range: 15 nmi (28 km; 17 mi)
- Characteristic: Fl W 2.4s

Point de Maisonnette is a cape located in northeastern New Brunswick, Canada. Its geographic coordinates are 47º50'15"N, 65º00'13"W.

It is the dividing point for delineating the northern limits of Caraquet Bay from Chaleur Bay. It is located near the unincorporated fishing community of Maisonnette.

The Canadian Coast Guard maintains a light station at Pointe de Maisonnette.

== Operation Pointe Maisonnette ==
Pointe de Maisonnette was the focal point of a minor naval operation during World War II which saw vessels of the Royal Canadian Navy ambush U-536 in late September 1943 as part of what is known as the Battle of the St. Lawrence.

Canadian military intelligence and the Royal Canadian Mounted Police (RCMP) intercepted mail addressed to several Kriegsmarine officers (including Otto Kretschmer) imprisoned at the Camp 30 prisoner of war camp at Bowmanville, Ontario in early 1943. The correspondence detailed an escape plan, known as Operation Kiebitz, in which the prisoners were to tunnel out of the camp and make their way (using currency and false documents provided to them) through eastern Ontario and across Quebec to the northeastern tip of New Brunswick off the Pointe Maisonnette lighthouse where the POW escapees would be retrieved by a U-boat.

Canadian authorities did not tip off the POWs and detected signs of tunnel digging at Camp 30 shortly afterward. All POWs except one were arrested at the time of their escape attempt; the sole POW who managed to escape travelled all the way to Pointe de Maisonette undetected, likely travelling onboard Canadian National Railways passenger trains to the Bathurst area. This POW was apprehended by military police and RCMP on the beach in front of the lighthouse the night of the arranged U-boat extraction.

The RCN provided a U-boat counter-offensive force (code-named "Operation Pointe Maisonnette") that was led by HMCS Rimouski (K121), which was outfitted with an experimental version of diffuse lighting camouflage for the operation.

The task force led by Rimouski waited in Caraquet Harbour, obscured by Caraquet Island, the night of 26–27 September 1943 and detected the presence of U-536 off Pointe de Maisonnette while shore authorities arrested the POW escapee.

U-536 managed to elude the RCN task force by diving just as the surface warships began attacking with depth charges; however, the submarine was able to escape the Gulf of St. Lawrence without making the planned extraction.

== See also ==
- List of lighthouses in New Brunswick
