= HMCS Snowberry =

Flower-class corvette

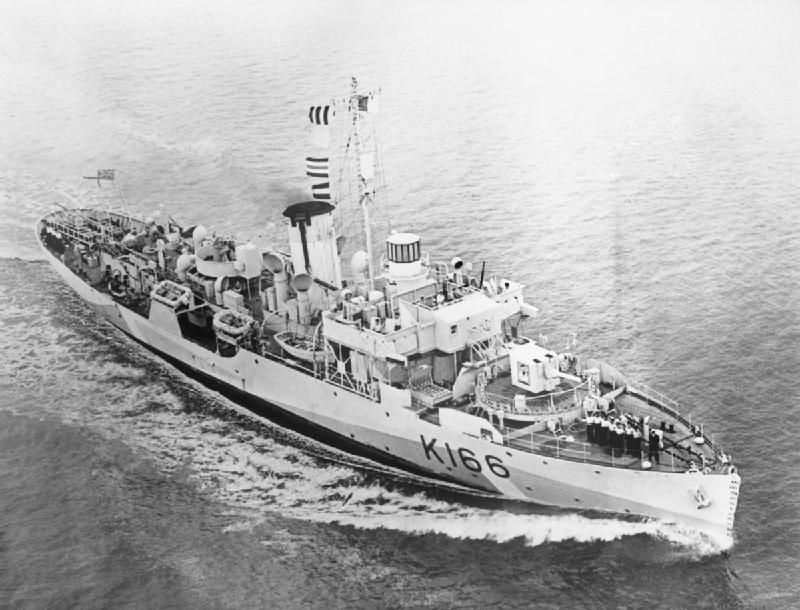
- HMCS Snowberry in May 1943

History

United Kingdom
- Name: Snowberry
- Namesake: Snowberry
- Ordered: 22 January 1940
- Builder: Davie Shipbuilding, Lauzon
- Laid down: 24 February 1940
- Launched: 8 August 1940
- Commissioned: 26 November 1940
- Out of service: loaned to Royal Canadian Navy 15 May 1941
- Identification: Pennant number: K166
- Fate: Returned from RCN June 1945. Scrapped in August 1947 at Middlesbrough.

Canada
- Name: Snowberry
- Acquired: loaned from Royal Navy
- Commissioned: 15 May 1941
- Out of service: returned to Royal Navy 27 June 1945
- Refit: Forecastle extended at Charleston on 14 May 1943.
- Identification: Pennant number: K166
- Honours and awards: Atlantic 1941-44, Biscay 1943, English Channel 1945; Gulf of St. Lawrence 1944

General characteristics
- Class & type: Flower-class corvette (original)
- Displacement: 925 long tons (940 t; 1,036 short tons)
- Length: 205 ft (62.48 m)o/a
- Beam: 33 ft (10.06 m)
- Draught: 11.5 ft (3.51 m)
- Propulsion: single shaft; 2 × fire tube Scotch boilers; 1 × 4-cycle triple-expansion reciprocating steam engine; 2,750 ihp (2,050 kW)
- Speed: 16 knots (29.6 km/h)
- Range: 3,500 nautical miles (6,482 km) at 12 knots (22.2 km/h)
- Complement: 85
- Sensors & processing systems: 1 × SW1C or 2C radar; 1 × Type 123A or Type 127DV sonar
- Armament: 1 × BL 4 in (102 mm) Mk.IX gun; 2 × .50 cal machine gun (twin); 2 × Lewis .303 cal machine gun (twin); 2 × Mk.II depth charge throwers; 2 × Depth charge rails with 40 depth charges

HMCS Snowberry was a Flower-class corvette that was originally built for the Royal Navy, but spent most of the war in service with the Royal Canadian Navy. She fought primarily as a convoy escort during the Second World War. She served primarily in the Battle of the Atlantic.

== Background ==
Flower-class corvettes like Snowberry serving with the Royal Canadian Navy during the Second World War were different from earlier and more traditional sail-driven corvettes. The "corvette" designation was created by the French for classes of smaller warships just below a frigate in size and power, but above a sloop or gunvessel; the Royal Navy borrowed the term for a period during the 19th Century, but discontinued its use after the 1880s, with the introduction of a new rating system for cruising warships. During the hurried preparations for war in the late 1930s, Winston Churchill reactivated the corvette designation, needing a name for smaller ships used in an escort capacity, in this case based on a whaling ship design. The generic name "flower" was used to designate the class of these ships, which – in the Royal Navy – were named after flowering plants.

== Construction ==
Snowberry was ordered by the Royal Navy (RN) 22 January 1940 as part of the 1939-1940 Flower-class building program. She was laid down by George T. Davie & Sons Ltd. at Lauzon on 24 February 1940 and launched on 8 August 1940. She was commissioned into the RN on 26 November 1940. She sailed to the United Kingdom in February 1941 and was completed at Greenock in April 1941. On 15 May 1941 Snowberry was one of ten corvettes loaned to Canada. She could be told apart from other Canadian Flowers by her lack of minesweeping gear and the siting of the after gun tub amidships.

During her career Snowberry had three significant refits. The first took place at Charleston beginning in December 1941 and taking six weeks to complete. Her second overhaul took place again at Charleston from March 1943 until 14 May 1943. In late March 1944 she went to Baltimore, Maryland for a five-week refit.

== War service ==
=== Royal Navy ===
After completing at Greenock and working up at Tobermory, Snowberry was assigned to Western Approaches Command. In June 1941, she sailed for Newfoundland after being loaned to the Royal Canadian Navy.

=== Royal Canadian Navy ===
Upon her arrival in Newfoundland in June 1941 she joined Newfoundland Command as a convoy escort between St. John's and Iceland. From July to October 1941 she was deployed as such. She departed for a short refit and upon her return in February 1942 she was briefly deployed as an ocean escort once again.

In March 1942 Snowberry transferred to Western Local Escort Force (WLEF). In June 1942, after the U-boats had begun attacking oil tankers sailing along the North American coast, she joined the newly formed Tanker Escort Force. In September 1942 she was placed under American control escorting convoys between Guantánamo and New York.

She returned to service after her second major refit in August 1943, when she was assigned to Royal Navy controlled escort group EG 5. On 23 August 1943 Snowberry as part of the 5th Support Group, was deployed to relieve the 40th Escort Group which was undertaking a U-boat hunt off Cape Ortegal. The warships of both groups were attacked by 14 Dornier Do 217s and 7 Junkers Ju 87s that were carrying a new weapon the Henschel Hs 293 anti-ship guided missile. Several sailors were injured and killed in HMS Bideford (40th EG) but Snowberry escaped damage. Two days later, the 5th SG was relieved by the 1st Support Group and the warships of both groups were again attacked by 18 Dornier Do 217s also carrying Hs 293 weapons. Athabaskan was heavily damaged and HMS Egret was sunk but Snowberry again escaped damage.

On 20 November 1943 Snowberry, along with Nene and Calgary, depth charged and sank U-536 northeast of the Azores at 43° 50N, 19° 39W.

When the group replaced its corvettes with frigates in March 1944, Snowberry departed for her final refit. After workups she was briefly assigned to WLEF again but transferred to Portsmouth Command in mid-September 1944. She remained with them until she was decommissioned by the Royal Canadian Navy.

== Post-war service ==
Snowberry was paid off from the RCN on 8 June 1945 when she was returned to the Royal Navy at Rosyth. In 1946 she was used as a target ship off Portsmouth. Her remains were sold for scrap and in August 1947 she was broken up at Middlesbrough.
