= Convoy SL 139/MKS 30 =

Convoys during naval battles of the Second World War

- Part of World War II
Date	18–21 November 1943
Location	North Atlantic
Result	Allied victory

Belligerents
United Kingdom; Canada	Germany

Commanders and leaders
(United Kingdom) Cdre. JS Dalison	(Nazi Germany) Adm. Karl Dönitz

Strength
66 ships 19 escorts	29 U-boats

Casualties and losses
1 ship sunk 1 ship damaged 1 escort damaged	3 U-boats sunk

Convoys SL 139/MKS 30 were two Allied convoys which ran during the Battle of the Atlantic in World War II. SL 139 was one of the SL convoys from the South Atlantic to Britain, and MKS 30 one of the MKS convoys between Britain and the Mediterranean. They were sailing together on the Gibraltar homeward route, having made a rendezvous off Gibraltar in November 1943. They were the subject of a major U-boat attack, as part of the Kriegsmarine's renewed Autumn offensive.

== Background ==
Following the renewal of the U-boat offensive in the Atlantic, convoys on the UK/Gibraltar routes, had again come under attack. German U-boat Control (BdU) had established a patrol line off the coast of Portugal, which had already attacked Allied convoys in October, leading to an inconclusive clash over Convoy SL 138/MKS 28. In order to maximize the protection for convoys on this route the Admiralty and begun to run these in tandem, bringing together the South Atlantic and the Mediterranean routes at Gibraltar.

== Protagonists ==
SL 139 left Freetown on 2 November 1943, arriving off Gibraltar on 16 November. It comprised 42 ships and was escorted by an Escort Group, of nine warships. MKS 30 sailed from Port Said on 2 November, similarly arriving off Gibraltar on 16 November to meet SL 139. The combined body of 66 ships then sailed for Britain. It was escorted by 40 Escort Group, of seven warships, led by HMS Exe (Cdr. JS Dalison).

The Schill patrol group, which had been active in this area since October, was now organized into three patrol lines west of Portugal, while aircraft of the Luftwaffe from searched the ocean for any sign of the approaching convoys. The first, Schill 1, of seven U-boats, was the southernmost rake, running in a line to the west of Lisbon. The second, Schill 2, of ten U-boats, was aligned west of Cape Finisterre in Spain, while the third, Schill 3, of twelve U-boats, was 150 nautical miles (280 km; 170 mi) north of this, roughly along the 45 parallel.

== Action ==
The two convoys made their rendezvous on noon on 16 November 1943, a total of 66 ships initially escorted by 40 EG, seven warships led by Exe. The combined convoys were sighted by German aircraft on late afternoon of 16 November, southwest of Cape St Vincent, but were able to evade the shadow during the night.

On 18 November the convoys encountered Schill 1's patrol line. They were sighted by U-262, which was joined by two other boats (U-333, U-515) for the first assault. Also on the 18th the escort force was joined by 7 EG, a Support Group of five warships led by HMS Pheasant, (Cdr LF Durnford-Slater). Meanwhile, further north, U-211 of Schill 2 was caught by an RAF Wellington. She was depth-charged and sunk.,

During the night of 18/19 November, in a series of forays the U-boats tried to penetrate the escort screen, but without success. U-333 was attacked by Exe; she was damaged when she was rammed by Exe and was forced to return to base. Meanwhile, U-515 had attacked and damaged the sloop Chanticleer; she was forced to drop out, to be towed to the Allied Base in the Azores. Chanticleer survived the .. day journey, and was beached, but was declared unrecoverable. U-515 was counter-attacked, and also forced to retire with damage, leaving U-262 to shadow until Schill 2 could engage.

On 19 November the convoys joined by 5 EG, a Canadian group of six warships led by British frigate HMS Nene (Cdr JD Birch) operating in a Support Group role. Later on the 19th the convoys were also joined by destroyers Winchelsea and Wrestler, bringing the total escort strength up to nineteen warships.

At dusk on 19 November the convoys encountered Schill 2, which commenced an assault throughout the night of 19/20 November. Again, they were unable to penetrate the escort screen and during the night U-536 was destroyed by Nene and Snowberry, Canada's first Support group success.

On 20 November the boats of Schill 2 remained in contact. They were reduced to a shadowing role and came under air attack by patrolling aircraft, but in a series of gun duels two aircraft were shot down, a Liberator of 53 Sqdn by U-648 and an RCAF Sunderland of 422 Sqdn by U-618. None of the U-boats were lost or damaged by air attack, but U-538 was caught by Foley and Crane and destroyed.

That night 20/21 November the convoy and pursuing U-boats reached the boats of Schill 3 which joined the fray. Again all attacks were unsuccessful, though no U-boats were destroyed.

On 21 November the convoy was joined by another Support group, 4 EG, comprising six warships led by Bentinck (Cdr EH Chavasse), and by Prince Robert an RCN Armed Merchant Cruiser, fitted out as an AA gunship.

During 21 November BdU called off the U-boat assault, but the convoy was now in range of strike aircraft based in Occupied France. On the afternoon of 21 November the Luftwaffe launched an attack using its new weapon, the Hs 293 guided missile. Twenty-five He 177's each carrying two Hs 293s took off to attack SL 139/MKS 30. At a distance of several miles the drones were released, to be guided by radio control to their target. Despite AA fire from the escorts, particularly Prince Robert, two ships were hit: Marsa was sunk, Delius, damaged. During this assault two aircraft were forced to return with mechanical trouble, and three others failed to return.

This was the only attempt on the convoy by the Luftwaffe; the convoy continued its voyage without further incident, docking at Liverpool on 26 November 1943.

== Aftermath ==
Despite the concentration of U-boats for this attack, the U-boat Arm failed to make any impact on the convoy. No merchant ships were sunk by the U-boats, though one escort was damaged and subsequently written off, while three U-boats were destroyed. The Luftwaffe similarly had a disappointing result. Despite their new weapon, of which great things were expected, they saw only one ship sunk and one damaged, for the loss of three aircraft. For the Allies, their confidence in their ability to protect convoys and destroy attacking U-boats continued, and this was further vindication of the Support Group policy, with no less than three Support Groups able to throw their weight into the conflict.
