= SS Fort Camosun =

Canadian freighter

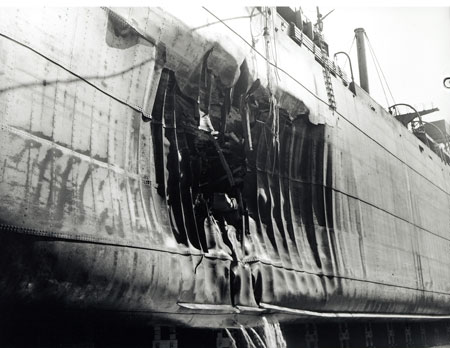
Torpedo explosion damage to port lower side of hull of SS Fort Camosun

SS Fort Camosun was a coal-burning 7000-ton freighter, built in Victoria, British Columbia, Canada in 1942. In June of 1942, during World War II, she departed Victoria Harbour on her maiden voyage to England with zinc, lead, plywood, timber and other raw materials. On 20 June 1942 the Japanese submarine I-25, under the command of Commander Akiji Tagami, torpedoed the Fort Camosun while she was 70 miles south-southwest of Cape Flattery, just eleven hours out of port, at 11:00pm. The torpedo hit the number two hold on the port side. The crew abandoned ship into the remaining good lifeboats. The submarine then surfaced and used deck guns to fire 18 shells at the Fort Camosun causing further damage to the ship. While badly damaged, the Fort Camosun did not sink, as she was loaded with plywood, timber and other floatable cargo. The crew radioed for help and later an American Flying Fortress located the crew. Later in the day HMCS Edmundston rescued the 31 crew of the sinking Fort Camosun. The Fort Camosun was towed to safety by HMCS Quesnel to Neah Bay. The Fort Camosun was low in the water and was towed with the help of the tugboat Henry Foss from Tacoma, US Navy tug USS Tatnuck and the tugboat Salvage Queen. Fort Camosun reached Neah Bay, later she was towed to Esquimalt B.C. At Esquimalt she was put in dry dock and temporary repairs were made. Fort Camosun repaired took timber to England, via Guantanamo and New York. On the way to England an U-boat attacked her convoy in the Atlantic. As she was passing through the North Channel alone a German aircraft tried to bomb her, but the bomb landed clear of the ship. Later she survived another torpedo attack in the Gulf of Aden.

I-25 was later sunk by one or more of the destroyers USS Ellet, USS Patterson, USS Taylor which were involved in the naval engagement on 3 September 1943 off the New Hebrides islands approximately 150 miles (240 km) northeast of Espiritu Santo. Which American ship sank the I-25 remains unknown.

== See also ==
- American Theater (1939–1945)
