= HMCS Chicoutimi (K156) =

Flower-class corvette

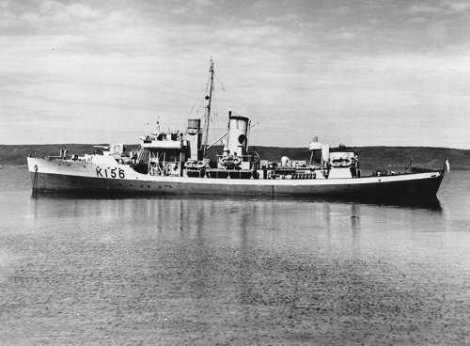

History

Canada
- Name: Chicoutimi
- Namesake: Chicoutimi
- Ordered: 20 January 1940
- Builder: Canadian Vickers Ltd. Montreal
- Laid down: 5 July 1940
- Launched: 16 October 1940
- Commissioned: 12 May 1941
- Out of service: 16 June 1945
- Identification: Pennant number: K156
- Honours and awards: Atlantic 1941–44
- Fate: Sold for scrapping

General characteristics
- Class & type: Flower-class corvette (original)
- Displacement: 925 long tons (940 t)
- Length: 205 ft (62 m) o/a
- Beam: 33 ft (10 m)
- Draught: 11.5 ft (3.5 m)
- Propulsion: single shaft; 2 × fire-tube Scotch boilers; 1 × 4-cycle triple-expansion reciprocating steam engine; 2,750 ihp (2,050 kW)
- Speed: 16 knots (29.6 km/h)
- Range: 3,500 nautical miles (6,482 km) at 12 knots (22.2 km/h)
- Complement: 85
- Sensors & processing systems: 1 × SW1C or 2C radar; 1 × Type 123A or Type 127DV sonar
- Armament: 1 × BL 4 in (102 mm) Mk.IX single gun; 2 × .50 cal machine gun (twin); 2 × Lewis .303 cal machine gun (twin); 2 × Mk.II depth charge throwers; 2 × depth charge rails with 40 depth charges; Originally fitted with minesweeping gear, later removed

HMCS Chicoutimi was a Flower-class corvette that served with the Royal Canadian Navy during the Second World War. Constructed at Montreal, the ship entered service in 1941 and served primarily in the Battle of the Atlantic as an ocean convoy escort. She was named for Chicoutimi, Quebec. Towards the end of the war, the vessel was used as a training ship. Soon after the war's end in 1945 the ship was decommissioned and sold for scrap in 1946.

== Design and description ==
Flower-class corvettes such as Camrose serving with the Royal Canadian Navy (RCN) in the Second World War were different from earlier and more traditional sail-driven corvettes. The Flower-class corvettes originated from a need that arose in 1938 to expand the Royal Navy following the Munich Crisis. A design request went out for a small escort for coastal convoys. Based on a traditional whaler-type design, the initial Canadian ships of the Flower class had a standard displacement of 950 long tons (970 t). They were 205 feet 1 inch (62.51 m) long overall with a beam of 33 feet 1 inch (10.08 m) and a maximum draught of 13 feet 5 inches (4.09 m). The initial 1939–1940 corvettes were powered by a four-cylinder vertical triple expansion engine powered by steam from two Scotch boilers turning one three-bladed propeller rated at 2,800 indicated horsepower (2,100 kW). The Scotch boilers were replaced with water-tube boilers in later 1939–1940 and 1940–1941 Programme ships. The corvettes had a maximum speed of 16 knots (30 km/h; 18 mph). This gave them a range of 3,450 nautical miles (6,390 km; 3,970 mi) at 12 knots (22 km/h; 14 mph). The vessels were extremely wet.

The Canadian Flower-class vessels were initially armed with a Mk IX BL 4-inch (102 mm) gun forward on a CP 1 mounting and carried 100 rounds per gun. The corvettes were also armed with a QF Vickers 2-pounder (40 mm, 1.6 in) gun on a bandstand aft, two single-mounted .303 Vickers machine guns or Browning 0.5-calibre machine guns for anti-aircraft defence and two twin-mounted .303 Lewis machine guns, usually sited on bridge wings. For anti-submarine warfare, they mounted two depth charge throwers and initially carried 25 depth charges. The corvettes were designed with a Type 123 ASDIC sonar set installed. The Flower-class ships had a complement of 47 officers and ratings. The Royal Canadian Navy initially ordered 54 corvettes in 1940 and these were fitted with Mark II Oropesa minesweeping gear used for destroying contact mines. Part of the depth charge rails were made portable so the minesweeping gear could be utilised.

== Construction and career ==
The corvette was ordered on 20 January 1940 as part of the 1939–1940 Flower-class building program. In a departure from the Royal Navy, the Royal Canadian Navy decided to name the ships after local communities in an effort to garner local support. The ship was laid down 5 July 1940 by Canadian Vickers Ltd. at Montreal, Quebec and launched on 16 October later that year, named for the city in Quebec. On 12 May 1941, Chicoutimi was commissioned at Montreal. She was one of the few Flower-class corvettes not to have her forecastle extended.

After arriving at Halifax, Nova Scotia on 17 May 1941, she was initially assigned to Sydney Local Escort Force. In September 1941 she joined Newfoundland Escort Force as a mid-ocean escort. She served the next five months escorting convoys across the Atlantic Ocean. In February 1942, Chicoutimi was reassigned to the Western Local Escort Force (WLEF). In July, as part of WLEF group W 7, Chicoutimi relieved the escort of convoy ON 113 which had been engaged with U-boats from 23 to 26 July and escorted the remnants to safety near Sable Island. However, as they approached New York, they were engaged by U-132, which managed to sink one ship. The resulting counterattack by the escorts damaged the submarine and prevented further sinkings. Beginning in June 1943, the corvette was assigned to escort group W 1. She served with WLEF until August 1944. In August 1944, Chicoutimi was sent to join HMCS Cornwallis as a training ship. She remained so for the rest of the year and into early 1945. In April 1945, she rejoined Sydney Force and remained with that unit until the end of the war. She was paid off at Sorel, Quebec on 16 June 1945. The ship was sold in June 1946 and broken up at Hamilton. For service in the Second World War, Chicoutimi earned the battle honour "Atlantic 1941–44".
