= Veterans Guard of Canada =

- Active: May 24, 1940 – 1947
- Disbanded: 1947
- Country: Canada
- Branch: Canadian Army
- Role: Home defence Guarding military installations Guarding POWs
- Engagements: Second World War: Atlantic Theatre; St. Lawrence Patrols; Pacific Theatre; Battle of Bowmanville

Commanders
- Notable commanders: Harold Douglas Hedley

The Veterans Guard of Canada (initially Veterans Home Guard) was a citizen militia supporting the Canadian Army during the Second World War, tasked with defending mainland Canada. They were modelled after the British Home Guard.

== History ==
With the outbreak of war in September 1939, Canada realized the need for a local defence force to guard against enemy attacks on the Atlantic and Pacific coasts. Following the lead of the British Home Guard, Canada began recruiting veterans of the First World War who, although they were unfit for overseas service, were eager to serve their country, despite being considered too old under the rules of enlistment.

Rejected veterans, in particular the Royal Canadian Legion, appealed to the federal government, and on May 23, 1940, Minister of National Defence Norman McLeod Rogers declared "it had been decided to establish a force to be known as the Veteran’s Home Guard for the adequate protection of military property on the home front." Members would free younger men for overseas duty by replacing the Canadian Provost Corps (the military police of the Canadian Army) guarding facilities such as the 40 internment and prisoner-of-war camps operated across the country in the course of WWII.

The age requirement was “under 50” (later raised to 55), and the men, all volunteers, had to be First World War veterans that served in Canadian or British forces, fit and honourably discharged. On duty the men wore battle dress uniforms, were armed, and had the same service obligations and received the same pay ($1.30 a day) and allowances as other soldiers.

An estimated 25,000 veterans from across the country volunteered for the Guard by the end of 1940, though many were rejected for not meeting the age or fitness requirements.

At its peak strength in June 1943, the Guard was composed of 451 officers and 9,806 other ranks. More than 15,000 veterans served with 37 regular and three special-duty companies in the course of the war. Guard members fought one major armed engagement, the Battle of Bowmanville, suppressing a three-day riot at the PoW camp at Bowmanville on Lake Ontario that involved fighting between the veterans and much younger German prisoners using fists, broom handles and hockey sticks when they objected to being shackled. There were numerous casualties on both sides, and one guard officer was captured and beaten.

The men were never intended for overseas duty, and most served only in Canada, but a few small detachments were sent abroad, to guard Canadian interests in London, Newfoundland, the Bahamas and British Guiana. Over a thousand of the men transferred to other units of the army, serving as specialists or instructors.

The Guard remained on active service until 1947. It had lost 336 men from illness or accidents during its existence.

== See also ==
- Pacific Coast Militia Rangers
- Home Guard (United Kingdom)
- Auxiliary Units, a British "stay behind" undercover force of 1940
- Volunteer Defence Corps (Australia)
- Home Guard (New Zealand)
