= Operation Kiebitz =

Failed World War II attempt to free German prisoners of war

Coordinates: 43.92694°N 78.66667°W

- Part of the American Theater of World War II
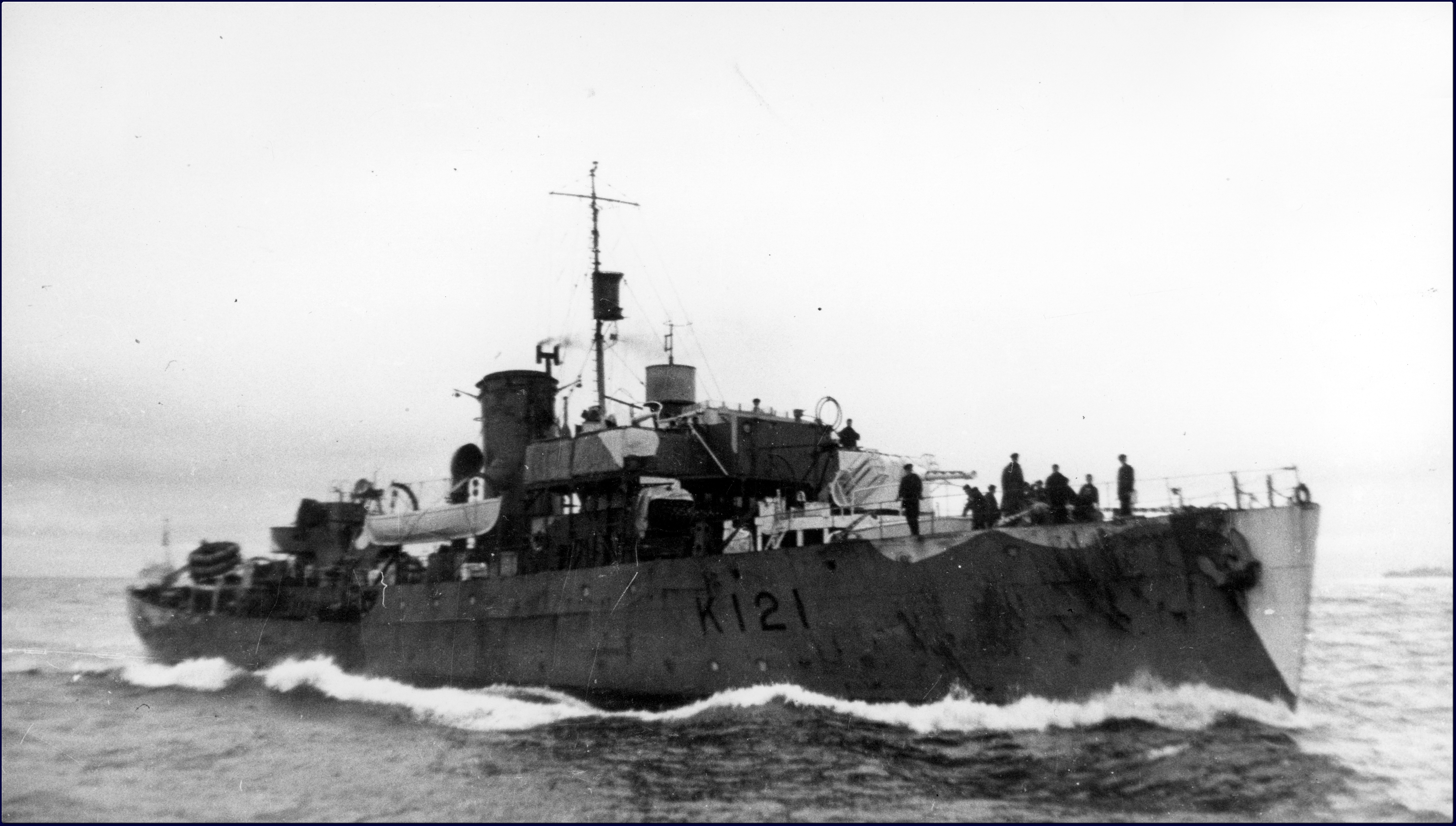
- HMCS Rimouski, seen here between 1944 and 1945, was the flagship in the operation that foiled the German escape attempt.
- Location: Canada
- Target: Camp 30, Bowmanville, Ontario
- Objective: Rescue German POWs from Canada
- Date: September 1943
- Executed by: Nazi Germany
- Outcome: Failed

Operation Kiebitz was a failed German operation during World War II to organize the escape of four skilled U-boat commanders from a Canadian prisoner of war camp in Bowmanville, Ontario. The subsequent counter operation by the Royal Canadian Navy, Operation Pointe Maisonnette, became a key engagement in the Battle of the St. Lawrence and was also successful in thwarting the Germans' plan.

== Prisoner escape plan ==
The plan was developed by the Kriegsmarine in 1942 and was to be executed in September 1943. Horst Elfe, captain of U-93; Hans Ey, captain of U-433; Otto Kretschmer, captain of U-99; and Hans Joachim Knebel-Döberitz, executive officer of U-99, would escape from Camp 30 in Bowmanville and make their way 1,400 kilometres (870 mi) through eastern Canada to northern New Brunswick, where they would rendezvous with a U-boat off Pointe de Maisonnette on Chaleur Bay. Knebel-Döberitz was the former adjutant of Admiral Karl Dönitz and, along with Kretschmer, was thought to be the primary reason behind this risky operation. Had it been successful, it would have been sensational propaganda material for the German war machine.

Coded messages were sent by mail through the International Committee of the Red Cross to the German prisoners at Camp 30 in Bowmanville, east of Toronto. These messages were intercepted by Canadian military intelligence and Canadian police who were screening all prisoner communications. The Canadian authorities did not tip off the prisoners that their plans were detected as the Royal Canadian Navy was hoping to get a rare chance to seize a German U-boat in Canadian waters, a feat that would have been an intelligence coup for the Allied navies.

== Tunnelling ==
The military, Royal Canadian Mounted Police ("Mounties") and camp guards monitored the German prisoners as they began to secretly dig several tunnels, at least one of which would eventually lead outside the camp boundaries. The tunnellers also created a crude railway that could haul the soil out of the tunnel, allowing the work to proceed more quickly and efficiently. At one point the excavated dirt from one of the tunnels collapsed part of the ceiling in a camp building where it was being hidden. The camp guards, aware of the ruse, did not stop the project.

As the date of the escape attempt drew closer, the Mounties and military guards moved in and seized the prisoners as they sought to implement their plan and collapsed the tunnel. In desperation, one of the Kriegsmarine officers, Wolfgang Heyda, captain of U-434, managed to escape over the camp walls using a crude zip-wire on electrical cables. Heyda eluded search parties and the massive police response and somehow made his way on Canadian National Railways passenger trains from southern Ontario to Pointe de Maisonnette. Heyda arrived at the location at the appointed time only to be arrested by Mounties and naval personnel, who were waiting to co-ordinate a surface task force that would attempt to attack and/or seize the U-boat.

== Operation Pointe Maisonnette ==
In order to capture the U-boat, the Royal Canadian Navy and the Canadian Army established a portable surface radar array on shore at the Pointe de Maisonnette (New Brunswick) lighthouse, which would be used to locate the submarine by a task force of several warships centred on HMCS Rimouski. Rimouski was outfitted with an experimental diffused lighting camouflage system that was considered revolutionary at the time. She and the rest of the task group, under the command of Desmond Piers, were hidden nearby to wait for the German submarine.

U-536, which had been tasked with picking up the escaping naval officers, arrived off Pointe de Maisonnette at the appointed time on the night of September 26, 1943. The Royal Canadian Navy and Canadian Army personnel on shore signalled with a light that the escapees were to have used. However the U-boat commander was suspicious, particularly after his hydrophones picked up the sound of the Canadian task group nearby. He opted to remain submerged and began to evade the Canadian warships, which searched throughout the night and attempted unsuccessfully to attack U-536 with depth charges.

Despite evading the Canadians' trap in Chaleur Bay that September, U-536 was sunk the following month northeast of the Azores by one British and two Canadian warships, claiming 38 lives.

== In fiction ==
The events of Operation Kiebitz inspired the Sidney Shelley POW novel The Bowmanville Break in 1968. A 1970 film adaptation of the book titled The McKenzie Break moves the story from Canada to Scotland. The film features the escape of approximately thirty U-boat men (who murder several of their fellow prisoners to facilitate the escape), and all but the leader and a few others successfully make it to the waiting submarine before it is forced to flee due to the presence of an Allied torpedo boat. In the book, Operation Kiebitz (which is referred to by name) is meant to liberate thirty German submariners rather than four, but their tunnel prematurely collapses, so only three men make it to the rendezvous point. The escape of the empty-handed U-536 is included, but a second submarine is also present in the book, and battles with the Allied ships and planes while the U-536 escapes. The antagonist of the story and leader of the escape is based on Kretschmer, which is especially notable in the book. In both versions, the escape is being done less for propaganda reasons and more to give the Nazis experienced submarine crewmen for the losing war effort. In the book, it is hoped that their contributions might help Germany sue for peace on better terms, while in the film, the plan's leader seems to arrogantly believe that they can change the scope of the war.

== See also ==
- Great Papago Escape
