= Battle of Bowmanville =

1942 POW prison revolt

- Part of the American Theater of World War II
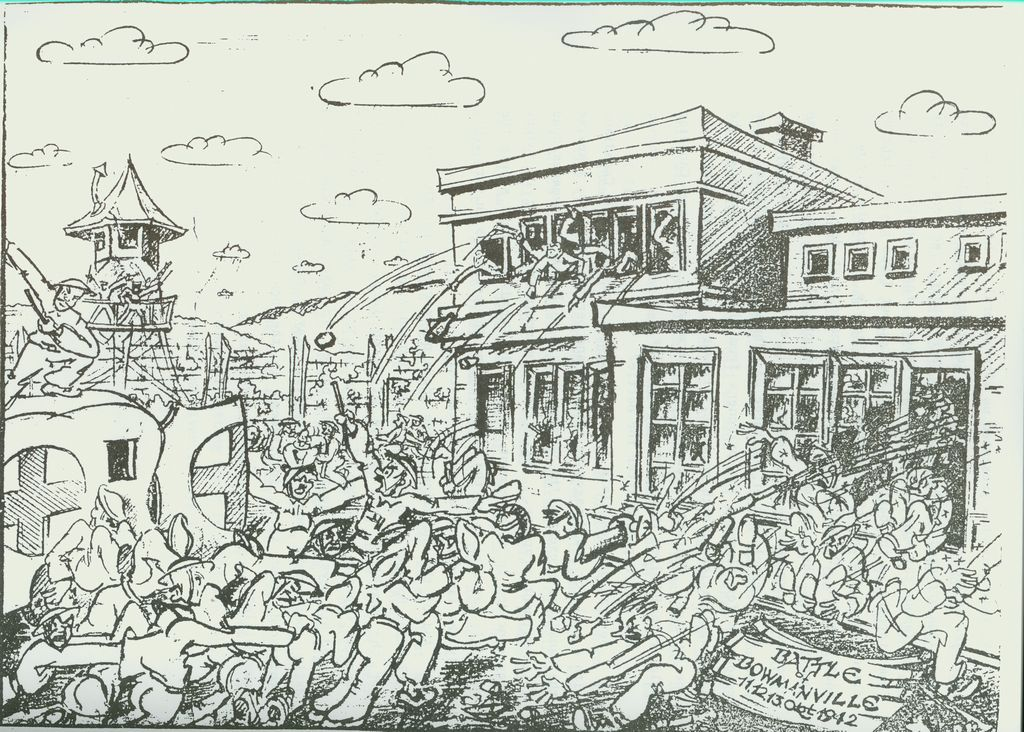
- Caricature of the battle
Date	October 10–12, 1942
Location	Camp 30 in Bowmanville, Ontario 43°55′37″N 78°40′00″W
Result	Canadian victory: Revolt failed

Belligerents
Canada	Germany

Units involved
Veterans Guard of Canada; Canadian Army cadet commandos	126 German POWs

Casualties and losses
1 Veteran's Guard injured	Several wounded

The Battle of Bowmanville was a 1942 revolt in the Bowmanville prisoner of war camp (Camp 30) in Ontario, Canada. The prisoners, most of whom were higher-ranking German officers, objected to the intended shackling of 100 prisoners. The revolt lasted for three days.

== Revolt ==
The residents of Camp 30 were mostly Germans captured by the British and sent to Canada for internment in anticipation of a potential invasion of Britain. They were guarded by the Veterans Guard of Canada. The violence began after 126 prisoners were sent to another camp to be shackled as a reprisal for the chaining of Canadian soldiers captured at Dieppe (itself a reaction to captured plans for the shackling of German POWs). After a period of hand-to-hand fighting, during which one Canadian guard had his skull fractured, 400 prisoners barricaded themselves in a hall. They remained there for over a day while the guards awaited reinforcements. A group of students at a nearby commando course in Kingston, Ontario arrived on Thanksgiving, subduing the barricaded prisoners with fire hoses and tear gas.

Three shots were fired during the revolt, two of which wounded PoW Volkmar Koenig, shot by a tower guard after prisoners grabbed a Canadian officer. Another prisoner was stabbed with a bayonet, but survived. A number of other prisoners and guards were injured during the revolt, often in hand-to-hand combat.

== See also ==
- List of incidents of civil unrest in Canada
