= Bowmanville POW camp =

WW2 POW camp, Ontario, Canada

Coordinates: 43°55′37″N 78°40′00″W

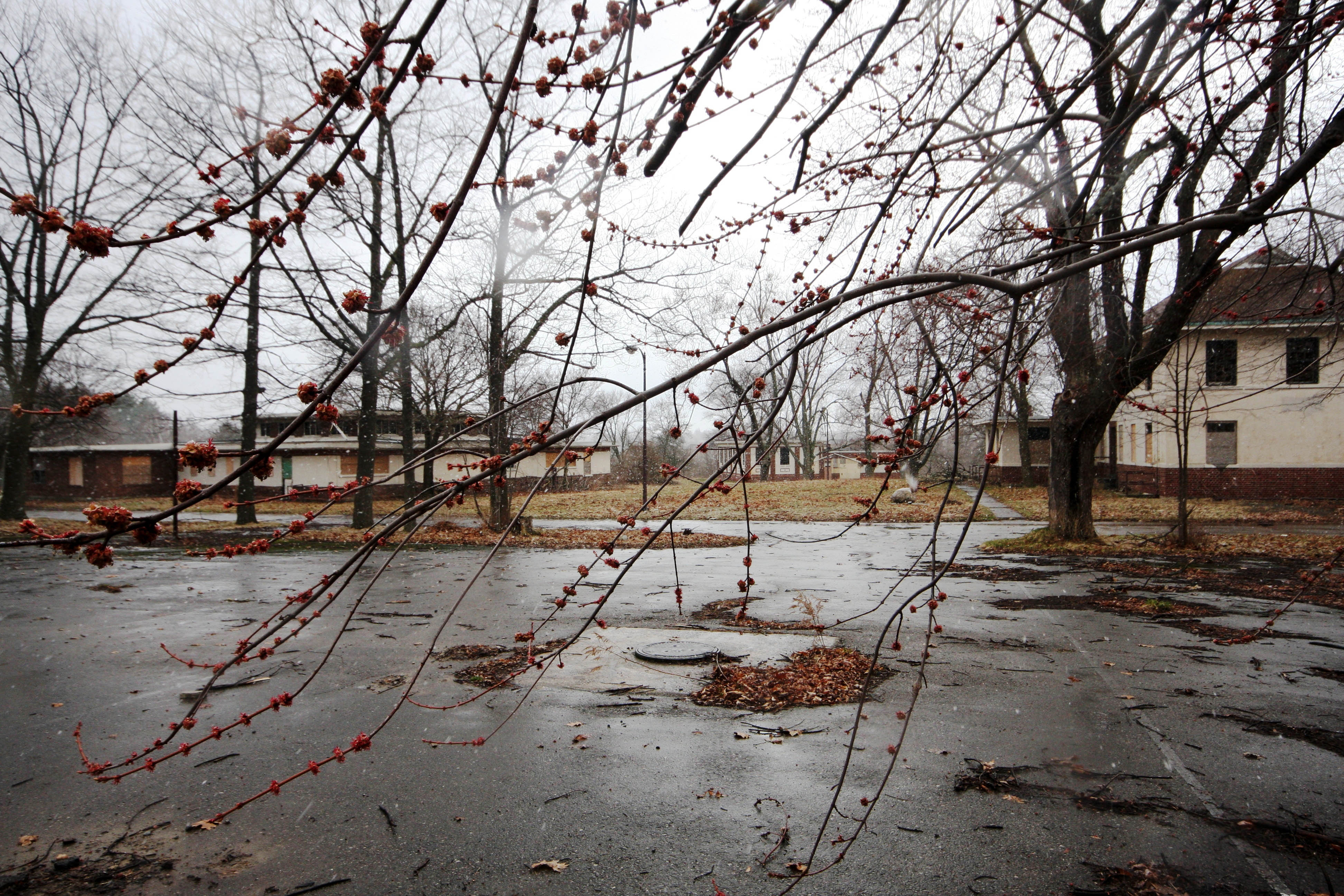
Bowmanville POW camp in 2011

The Bowmanville POW camp, also known as Camp 30, was a Canada administered POW camp for German soldiers during World War II located on 2020 Lambs Road in the community of Bowmanville, Ontario in Clarington, Ontario, Canada. In September 2013, the camp was designated a National Historic Site of Canada.

In 1943, prisoners Otto Kretschmer and Wolfgang Heyda were the subject of an elaborate escape named Operation Kiebitz.

== Early history ==
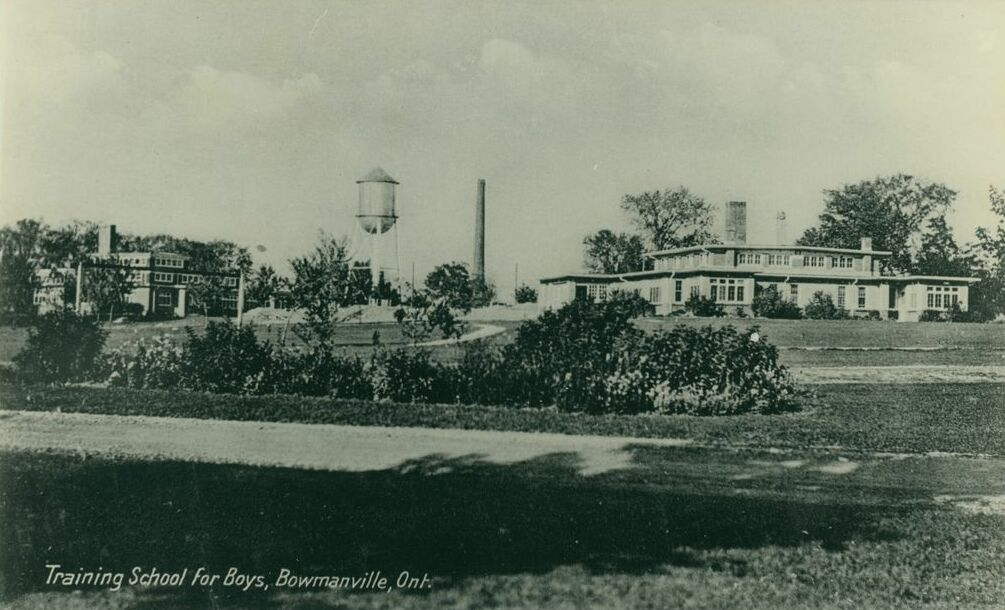
The Boys Training School, circa 1920s

The camp was built as the Bowmanville Boys Training School. Two of the early buildings were completed in 1927. Boys were educated there until 1941, 14 years after it first opened; when the school was ordered to relocate and turned it into a POW camp. Bowmanville Boys Training School was relocated within Bowmanville to "Rathskamoray" (currently the Lion's Centre), although most boys returned home.

Canadian officials had barely seven months to convert the boys' school into a POW camp. The school was built to hold many people, but the officials had many tasks to complete before POWs could be moved in: building barb-wire fences 15 feet (5 m) apart, guard towers (nine), as well as gates and barracks for the Canadian guards. These tasks were completed in late 1941, just as the POWs started arriving.

After the war ended, the POWs were repatriated to Europe, and the site resumed its use as a school.

== Battle of Bowmanville ==
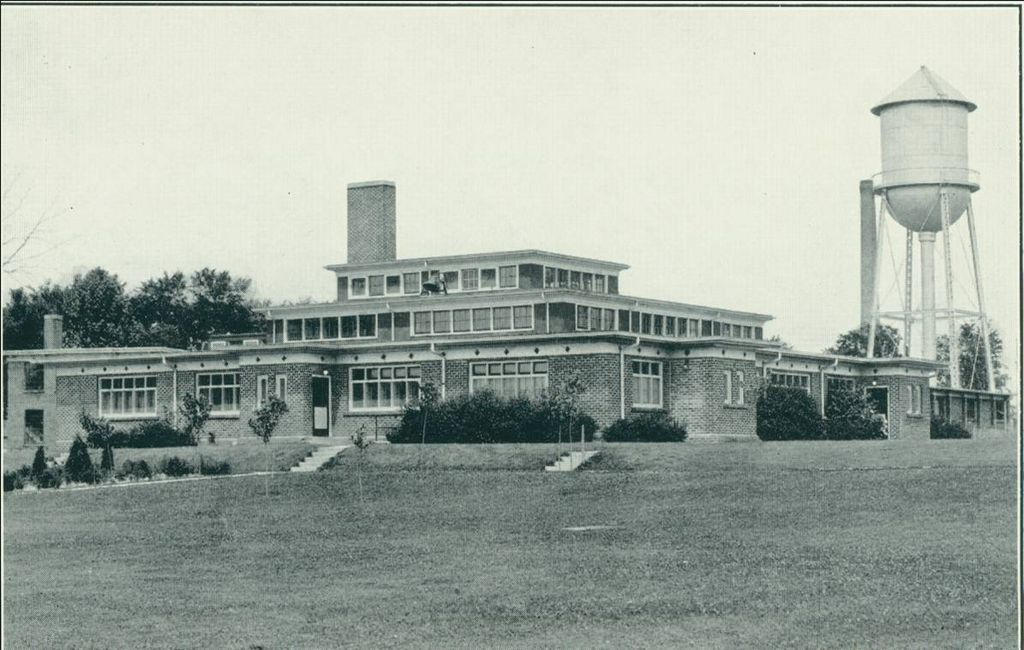
Cafeteria and site of "Battle of Bowmanville", c. 1930

In October 1942, between 1,500 and 4,000 prisoners revolted against the Veteran Guards after some of the POWs were shackled as retribution as part of the escalation of Germany's new Commando Order.

Lieutenant-colonel James Taylor had asked German POW senior officer Georg Friemel to volunteer 100 POWs to be shackled as part of the ongoing international dispute; he refused. The same was the result when Otto Kretschmer and Hans Hefele were also asked to provide volunteers.

Taylor ordered the guards to shackle by force 100 officers; Horst Elfe, Kretschmer and others barricaded themselves in the mess hall, arming themselves with available makeshift weapons: sticks, iron bars and more. Approximately 100 Canadian soldiers were requisitioned from a base in Kingston. Armed with ice hockey sticks, the mess hall was stormed and after brawling for several hours there was a stalemate. The Canadians, reinforced with high pressure water hoses, soaked the cabin thoroughly and the POWs eventually peacefully surrendered although incidents would continue during the next several days. Volkmar König was wounded by gunfire, another prisoner was bayoneted, and a Canadian soldier suffered a skull fracture from a thrown jar of jam. At its conclusion 126 of the POWs were transferred to other camps.

== Attempts and escapes ==
Attempts and escapes occurred at the POW camp although it was opined that the POWs received relatively better war-time treatment than the surrounding Bowmanville area residents.

- The first camp escape came on 23 November 1941, shortly after its opening. Ulrich Steinhilper was on the run for two days before being temporarily apprehended. He would escape a few weeks later, be returned after his last attempt on February 18, 1942, and eventually be relocated to Camp 20.
- November 25, 1941. A prisoner crawl underneath the barbed wire for freedom, but was caught immediately and given a 28-day detention.
- Operation Kiebitz - failed attempt to free four German submarine commanders.
- On 30 December 1941 a POW escaped hiding in an off-site laundry service truck. He was held in the Oshawa Jail for a few hours before being returned to camp the same day.
- During a routine inspection of the prisoner's cells on 29 July 1943, a tin can was found with a map and tools to aid in an escape. The evidence was confiscated and its whereabouts became unknown.
- It is opined the most notorious escape attempts were those POWs' tunneling. Usually when found these tunnels would be closed off. The most developed tunneling failure was started in the North-east corner of Victoria Hall (referred to by POWs as Haus IV). The tunnel was 20 by 20 in (50 by 50 cm); lighting had been wired in, and a "piped" ventilation system installed using tin cans. Timbers were located every 3 to 7 feet (1 to 2 m), made from lumber removed from camp buildings' attics. The tunnelling's would be removed via a trolley system then passed by buckets through an opening in the ceiling and stored in the attic. By September 1943, the attic floor would collapse from the weight of the tunnellings. Guards collapsed the shaft after discovery. Another reference to the incident calls attention to a local wanna-be police officer then employed as a laundry service delivery truck driver who told the camp guards of the POW overalls coming back with red clay on them.

== Present day ==
The camp would continue as a boys' training school until 1979, and various academic uses until 2008 (school for overseas Malaysian students, St. Stephen's Catholic Secondary School and finally a private Islamic university).

After 2008, POW Camp 30 was greatly neglected. Buildings are boarded up, doors are blocked by dirt, or are also boarded up. All windows are broken, and interiors of the buildings are badly marred with graffiti on the walls, or drywall destroyed. Much is considered dangerous or a fire hazard (there is fire damage within all of the largest buildings), but some remain in fairly good condition, with minimal water damage.

In 2013, Camp 30 was included in Heritage Canada's list for 'The top 10 endangered places of 2013' at a time when the idea of redevelopment of the area would mean demolition of the buildings instead of reuse. This demolition plan was cancelled later in 2013, after it was named a National Historic Site. Most agree that the site should be saved, but at the moment it is undecided what will be done with the property. "All we want to see is reuse of the buildings ... some people want a big, beautiful museum, we understand the finances aren't there. We just want to see adaptive reuse" the president of ACO Clarington, Tracey Ali, said to the Clarington newspaper. The estimated amount to restore all buildings could go as high as Canadian $15,000,000.

The Clarington paper also reported of how a committee was created September 9, 2013 to look at how the buildings could be saved, and how they will be preserved. A heritage plaque is expected to be put up, given its landmark designation.

The site is currently in poor condition, vandalized, abandoned and neglected.

Today the cafeteria is little more than a brick shell, although the building's original freezer remains intact. Also, the basement has the remains of two boilers.

On July 5, 2016, the Municipality of Clarington announced that they had completed a purchase agreement with the current owners of the property, Kaitlin Developments and Fandor Homes. This move has effectively saved the site from eventual destruction by a combination of vandalism, inadequate funding, and eventual home development. The sale included a $500,000 donation to the Municipality to assist in the maintenance and care of the property in conjunction with an initial site cleanup. The cleanup will involve destroying buildings that have not received a historical status, cleaning up graffiti, and the installation of security cameras.

In late 2023, Clarington council unanimously voted to reject a developer's proposal to demolish the camp's triple dormitory in order to make way for a new housing development. At that time, the building was in a state of disrepair due to a lack of regular maintenance.

An engineering assessment in 2022 estimated that it would cost $22 million (adjusted to 2024 dollars) to restore the camp's cafeteria building, the largest of the camp's remaining buildings. In late 2024, Clarington indicated it wanted to consult the Jury Lands Foundation and the local Heritage Committee about alternative suggestions to commemorate the building.

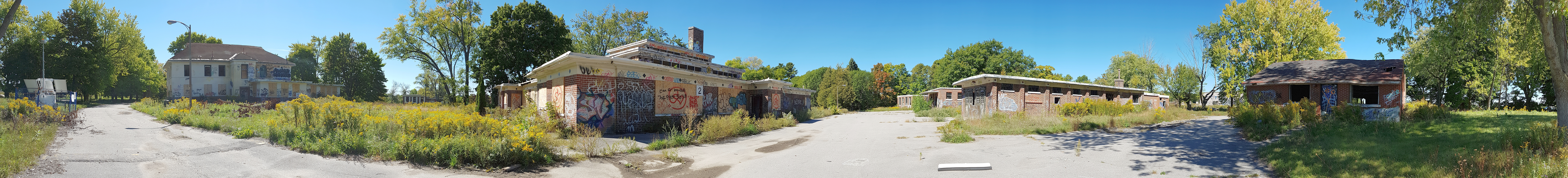
Bowmanville POW camp (2016)

== Sources ==
- Hodgson, Lynn Philip; Longfield, Alan Paul (2003). Word of honour: Camp 30, Bowmanville. Inside Camp X series. Introduction by Volkmar Koenig, PoW. Port Perry, Ont: Blake Books Distribution. ISBN 9780968706282. OCLC 53458569.
- "P.O.W. Camp 30 History". 2009. Archived from the original on 2013-09-06.
- O'Meara, J. September 2013. Camp 30 set to take its place in history. Clarington
