= German submarine U-536 =

German World War II submarine

Coordinates: 43°50′N 19°39′W

History

Nazi Germany
- Name: U-536
- Ordered: 10 April 1941
- Builder: Deutsche Werft, Hamburg
- Yard number: 354
- Laid down: 13 March 1942
- Launched: 21 October 1942
- Commissioned: 13 January 1943
- Fate: Sunk on 20 November 1943

General characteristics
- Class & type: Type IXC/40 submarine
- Displacement: 1,144 t (1,126 long tons) surfaced; 1,257 t (1,237 long tons) submerged
- Length: 76.76 m (251 ft 10 in) o/a; 58.75 m (192 ft 9 in) pressure hull
- Beam: 6.86 m (22 ft 6 in) o/a; 4.44 m (14 ft 7 in) pressure hull
- Height: 9.60 m (31 ft 6 in)
- Draught: 4.67 m (15 ft 4 in)
- Installed power: 4,400 PS (3,200 kW; 4,300 bhp) (diesels); 1,000 PS (740 kW; 990 shp) (electric)
- Propulsion: 2 shafts; 2 × diesel engines; 2 × electric motors
- Speed: 18.3 knots (33.9 km/h; 21.1 mph) surfaced; 7.3 knots (13.5 km/h; 8.4 mph) submerged
- Range: 13,850 nmi (25,650 km; 15,940 mi) at 10 knots (19 km/h; 12 mph) surfaced; 63 nmi (117 km; 72 mi) at 4 knots (7.4 km/h; 4.6 mph) submerged
- Test depth: 230 m (750 ft)
- Complement: 4 officers, 44 enlisted
- Armament: 6 × torpedo tubes (4 bow, 2 stern); 22 × 53.3 cm (21 in) torpedoes; 1 × 10.5 cm (4.1 in) SK C/32 deck gun (180 rounds); 1 × 3.7 cm (1.5 in) SK C/30 AA gun; 1 × twin 2 cm FlaK 30 AA guns

Service record
- Part of: 4th U-boat Flotilla; 13 January – 31 May 1943; 2nd U-boat Flotilla; 1 June – 20 November 1943
- Identification codes: M 49 397
- Commanders: Kptlt. Rolf Schauenburg; 13 January – 20 November 1943
- Operations: 2 patrols: 1st patrol: 1 June – 9 July 1943; 2nd patrol: 29 August – 20 November 1943
- Victories: None

German submarine U-536 was a Type IXC U-boat of Nazi Germany's Kriegsmarine during World War II.

She was laid down at the Deutsche Werft (yard) in Hamburg as yard number 354 on 13 March 1942, launched on 21 October and commissioned on 13 January 1943 with Kapitänleutnant Rolf Schauenburg in command.

U-536 began her service career with training as part of the 4th U-boat Flotilla from 13 January 1943. She was reassigned to the 2nd flotilla for operations on 1 June.

She carried out two patrols, but did not sink any ships. She was a member of one wolfpack.

She was sunk by the British frigate Nene and Canadian corvette Snowberry on 19 or 20 November 1943 while she was attacking Convoy SL 139/MKS 30 northeast of the Azores.

== Design ==
German Type IXC/40 submarines were slightly larger than the original Type IXCs. U-536 had a displacement of 1,144 tonnes (1,126 long tons) when at the surface and 1,257 tonnes (1,237 long tons) while submerged. The U-boat had a total length of 76.76 m (251 ft 10 in), a pressure hull length of 58.75 m (192 ft 9 in), a beam of 6.86 m (22 ft 6 in), a height of 9.60 m (31 ft 6 in), and a draught of 4.67 m (15 ft 4 in). The submarine was powered by two MAN M 9 V 40/46 supercharged four-stroke, nine-cylinder diesel engines producing a total of 4,400 metric horsepower (3,240 kW; 4,340 shp) for use while surfaced, two Siemens-Schuckert 2 GU 345/34 double-acting electric motors producing a total of 1,000 shaft horsepower (1,010 PS; 750 kW) for use while submerged. She had two shafts and two 1.92 m (6 ft) propellers. The boat was capable of operating at depths of up to 230 metres (750 ft).

The submarine had a maximum surface speed of 18.3 knots (33.9 km/h; 21.1 mph) and a maximum submerged speed of 7.3 knots (13.5 km/h; 8.4 mph). When submerged, the boat could operate for 63 nautical miles (117 km; 72 mi) at 4 knots (7.4 km/h; 4.6 mph); when surfaced, she could travel 13,850 nautical miles (25,650 km; 15,940 mi) at 10 knots (19 km/h; 12 mph). U-536 was fitted with six 53.3 cm (21 in) torpedo tubes (four fitted at the bow and two at the stern), 22 torpedoes, one 10.5 cm (4.13 in) SK C/32 naval gun, 180 rounds, and a 3.7 cm (1.5 in) SK C/30 as well as a 2 cm (0.79 in) C/30 anti-aircraft gun. The boat had a complement of forty-eight.

== Service history ==
=== First patrol ===
The boat departed Kiel on 1 June 1943, moved through the North Sea, negotiated the gap between Iceland and the Faroe Islands and entered the Atlantic Ocean. She entered Lorient, on the French Atlantic coast, on 9 July.

=== Second patrol and loss ===
Her second foray took her as far as the Gulf of St. Lawrence, where she participated in Operation Kiebitz, an unsuccessful attempt to rescue four U-boat commanders from a prisoner of war camp in Bowmanville, east of Toronto. U-536 successfully escaped from a trap carefully laid by the Royal Canadian Navy and Royal Canadian Mounted Police at the point on the New Brunswick coast where she was to pick up the escapees on September 26, 1943. However, less than two months later, on 20 November, she was sunk northeast of the Azores by depth charges from a British frigate, HMS Nene, and two Canadian corvettes, HMCS Snowberry and HMCS Calgary.

Thirty-eight men died; there were seventeen survivors.

=== Wolfpacks ===
U-536 took part in one wolfpack, namely:

- Schill 2 (17 – 20 November 1943)

== See also ==
- Operation Kiebitz
- Bowmanville POW camp (Battle of Bowmanville)

== Bibliography ==
- Busch, Rainer; Röll, Hans-Joachim (1999). German U-boat commanders of World War II : a biographical dictionary. Translated by Brooks, Geoffrey. London, Annapolis, Md: Greenhill Books, Naval Institute Press. ISBN 1-55750-186-6.
- Busch, Rainer; Röll, Hans-Joachim (1999). Deutsche U-Boot-Verluste von September 1939 bis Mai 1945 [German U-boat losses from September 1939 to May 1945]. Der U-Boot-Krieg (in German). Vol. IV. Hamburg, Berlin, Bonn: Mittler. ISBN 3-8132-0514-2.
- Gröner, Erich; Jung, Dieter; Maass, Martin (1991). U-boats and Mine Warfare Vessels. German Warships 1815–1945. Vol. 2. Translated by Thomas, Keith; Magowan, Rachel. London: Conway Maritime Press. ISBN 0-85177-593-4.
- Kemp, Paul (1997). U-Boats Destroyed - German Submarine Losses in the World Wars. Arms & Armour. ISBN 1-85409-515-3.
