= HMCS Nene =

River-class frigate of the Royal Canadian Navy

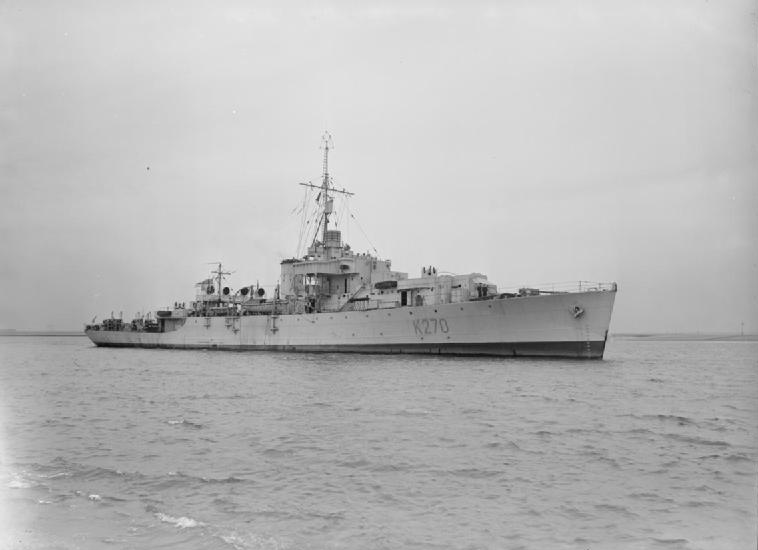
- HMS Nene

History

United Kingdom
- Name: Nene
- Namesake: River Nene, England
- Ordered: 24 January 1942
- Builder: Smiths Dock Co., Middlesbrough
- Laid down: 20 June 1942
- Launched: 9 December 1942
- Commissioned: 8 April 1943
- Out of service: 4 June 1944; (transferred to RCN)
- Reinstated: 11 June 1945
- Identification: Pennant number: K270
- Honours and awards: Biscay 1943; Arctic 1943–44; Atlantic 1943–44; North Sea 1945
- Fate: Broken up for salvage in 1955

Canada
- Name: Nene
- Commissioned: 4 June 1944
- Decommissioned: 11 June 1945
- Fate: Returned to RN

General characteristics
- Class & type: River-class frigate
- Displacement: 1,445 long tons (1,468 t; 1,618 short tons); 2,110 long tons (2,140 t; 2,360 short tons) (deep load)
- Length: 283 ft (86.26 m) p/p; 301.25 ft (91.82 m)o/a
- Beam: 36.5 ft (11.13 m)
- Draught: 9 ft (2.74 m); 13 ft (3.96 m) (deep load)
- Propulsion: 2 x Admiralty 3-drum boilers, 2 shafts, reciprocating vertical triple expansion, 5,500 ihp (4,100 kW)
- Speed: 20 knots (37.0 km/h); 20.5 knots (38.0 km/h) (turbine ships)
- Range: 646 long tons (656 t; 724 short tons) oil fuel; 7,500 nautical miles (13,890 km) at 15 knots (27.8 km/h)
- Complement: 157
- Armament: 2 × QF 4 in (102 mm) /45 Mk. XVI on twin mount HA/LA Mk.XIX; 1 × QF 12 pdr (3 in (76 mm)) 12 cwt /40 Mk. V on mounting HA/LA Mk.IX (not all ships); 8 × 20 mm QF Oerlikon A/A on twin mounts Mk.V; 1 × Hedgehog 24 spigot A/S projector; up to 150 depth charges

HMS Nene was a River-class frigate, designed for anti-submarine operations, that served with the Royal Navy during the Second World War. In 1944 she was loaned to the Royal Canadian Navy and recommissioned as HMCS Nene, who returned her to the Royal Navy in 1945. Following the war she remained in reserve until disposed of in 1955.

== Service history ==
=== Royal Navy ===
Nene was ordered on 24 January 1942 and built at Smiths Dock Co., Middlesbrough England. She was laid down on 20 June 1942 launched on 9 December later that year. The vessel was commissioned on 8 April 1943 into the Royal Navy. A Warship Week National Savings effort led to the community of Oundle – which lies on the River Nene – in Northamptonshire adopting the ship.

The ship joined the Western Approaches Command at Derry, Northern Ireland, and crossed the Atlantic on convoy duty to St. John's. The ship was involved in operations of the Royal Navy Support Group, then attached to the 5th and later 6th Escort Group, Western Approaches Command. In February 1944, the frigate was involved in anti-submarine operations off the west coast of Ireland, assisting in the sinking of submarine U-536 near the Azores.

=== Royal Canadian Navy ===
In March 1944 Nene arrived at Halifax, Nova Scotia, where the ship underwent a refit and was recommissioned into the Royal Canadian Navy, as HMCS Nene. In July the ship headed to Bermuda on a training run for the new crew, after which Nene joined Escort Group C5 Western Approaches Command. From the group's base at Derry, the ship escorted three transatlantic convoys with this group.

Nene served briefly as part of the convoy JW 61A, escorting personnel carriers, and then was assigned to Escort Group 9. After anti-submarine patrol around the British Isles, during which two of the group's ships were torpedoed, the frigate became one of many ships escorting convoys on the Murmansk Run. In April 1945, at Portsmouth harbour, SS Cuba, was torpedoed, and the crew of Nene rescued 265 sailors from the sinking ship.

In May 1945, as the war ended, Nene was called away from convoy duty to take part in the surrender of a group of fifteen German submarines, including U-992 and U-997, which were escorted to Loch Eriboll, Scotland, for disposal.

=== Return to the Royal Navy ===
On 11 June 1945 Nene was returned to the Royal Navy at Sheerness. Her Canadian crew were sent to the naval base at Greenlock, Scotland to await the trip home.

Nene was reclassified as a B2 reserve ship, was towed to Harwich and later to Barrow-in-Furness, and finally broken up for salvage in 1955 by Thos. W. Ward at Briton Ferry, Wales.

== Bibliography ==
- Colledge, J. J.; Warlow, Ben (2006) [1969]. Ships of the Royal Navy: The Complete Record of All Fighting Ships of the Royal Navy from the 15th Century to the Present (3rd Rev ed.). London: Chatham Publishing. ISBN 978-1-86176-281-8. OCLC 67375475.
- Geoffrey B Mason RN (edited Gordon Smith) HMS, later HMCS Nene (K 270) Service Histories of Royal Navy Warships in World War 2 naval-history.net (2005)
- HMS Nene (K 270) uboat.net
- HMCS Nene (K 270) uboat.net
