= BL 4-inch Mk IX naval gun =

Ordnance BL 4-inch Mk IX gun
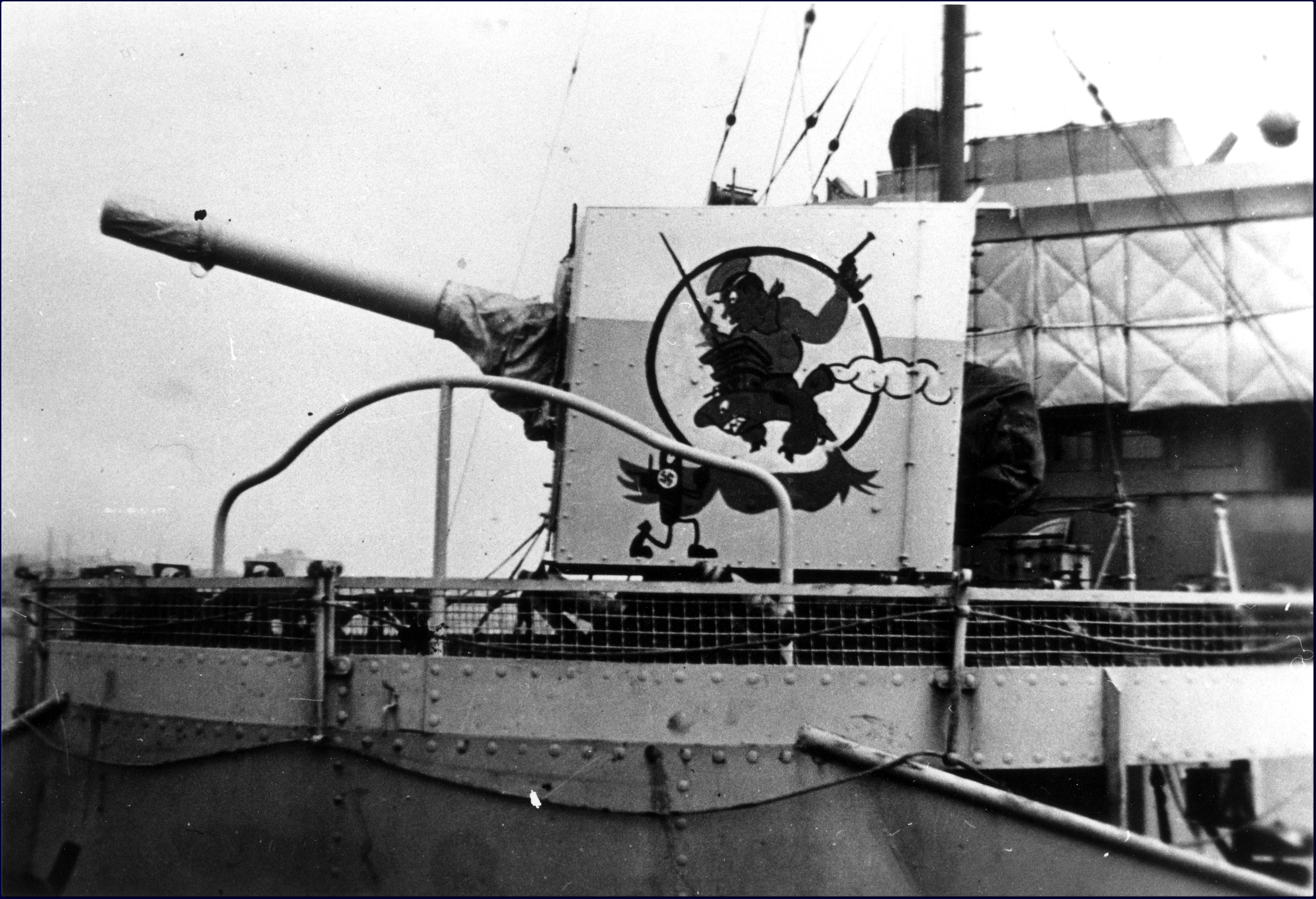
- On Flower-class corvette HMCS Calgary in World War II
- Type: Naval gun

Service history
- In service: 1917–1945
- Used by: Royal Navy; Royal Canadian Navy; Free French Navy; Hellenic Navy; Royal Indian Navy; Netherlands Navy; Royal New Zealand Navy; Norwegian Navy; South African Navy
- Wars: World War I World War II

Production history
- No. built: 2,382

Specifications
- Mass: 2 tons barrel & breech
- Barrel length: 180 inches (4.572 m) bore (45 calibres)
- Shell: 31 pounds (14.1 kg)
- Calibre: 4 inches (101.6 mm)
- Breech: Welin interrupted screw
- Elevation: -10 degrees to +30 degrees
- Rate of fire: 10-12 rpm
- Muzzle velocity: 800 metres per second (2,600 ft/s)
- Maximum firing range: 12,660 metres (13,850 yd)

The BL 4-inch Mk IX naval gun (Note: Mk IX = Mark 9. Britain used Roman numerals to denote Marks (models) of ordnance until after World War II. Mark IX indicates this was the ninth model of BL 4-inch gun.) was a British medium-velocity naval gun introduced in 1917 as secondary armament on the Renown-class battlecruisers and Glorious-class "large light cruisers", but which served most notably as the main armament on Flower-class corvettes throughout World War II.

== History ==
=== World War I ===
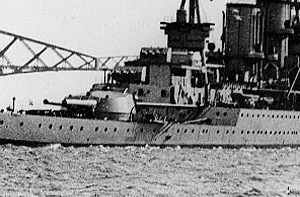
Original aft triple mounts on HMS Repulse c. 1916–1917

The gun was based on the barrel of the QF 4-inch Mk V and the breech mechanism of the BL 4-inch Mk VIII and was first introduced in World War I on capital ships as secondary armament in triple-gun mountings, intended to provide rapid concentrated fire. This turned out to be unworkable in practice. Jane's Fighting Ships of 1919 commented, "4-inch triples are clumsy and not liked. They are not mounted in one sleeve; have separate breech mechanism, a gun crew of 23 to each triple". Guns were thereafter used in single-gun mountings, typically on smaller ships as the main armament.

=== World War II ===
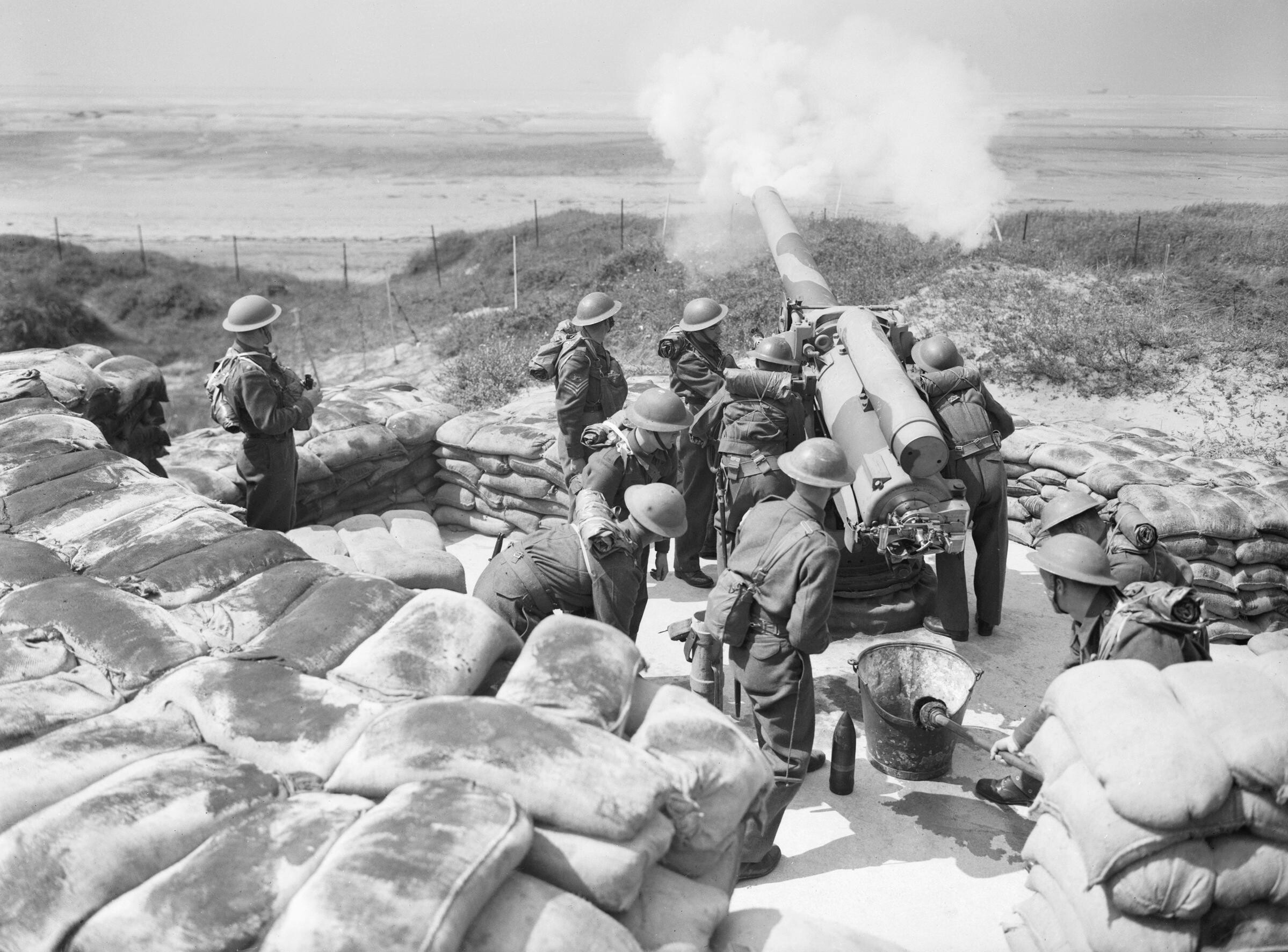
Coast defence gun and crew at Fort Crosby near Liverpool, UK, August 1940

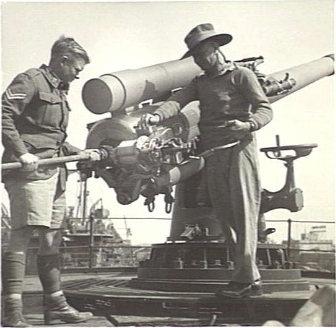
Cleaning the breech on transport St Essylt, Suez 1942

In World War II, the gun was employed on many small warships such as Flower-class corvettes and minesweepers, primarily for action against surfaced submarines.

This was the last BL 4 inch gun in British service: all subsequent guns have used charges in metal cartridges "QF". It was succeeded on new small warships built in World War II by the QF 4-inch Mk XIX gun which fired a slightly heavier shell at much lower velocity and had a high-angle mounting which added anti-aircraft capability.

== Surviving examples ==
- On board HMCS Sackville, the last surviving Flower-class corvette, at Halifax, Nova Scotia, Canada
- A gun at the entrance to the marina in Hull, UK
- A gun at Port Isaac, Cornwall, UK
- Leith Harbour, South Georgia.

== See also ==
- List of naval guns

== Bibliography ==
- Tony DiGiulian, British 4"/45 (10.2 cm) BL Marks IX and X
- Campbell, John (1985). Naval Weapons of World War Two. Naval Institute Press. ISBN 0-87021-459-4.
