= Convoy QS-33 =

Convoy during naval battles of the Second World War

Convoy QS 33
- Part of World War II, Battle of the Atlantic, Battle of the St. Lawrence
Date	6–10 September 1942
Location	St. Lawrence River
Result	German victory

Belligerents
Germany	Canada (Kingdom of Greece) Greece; Norway; United States

Commanders and leaders
BdU: Admiral Karl Dönitz; Eberhard Hoffmann; Paul Hartwig	E.G. Skinner

Strength
2 U-boats	8 merchant ships 5 escorts

Casualties and losses
	4 merchants sunk 1 escort sunk

Convoy QS 33 was a trade convoy of merchant ships during the Second World War. It was one of the numbered QS Convoys from Québec to Sydney, Nova Scotia. The convoy was attacked in the early months of the Battle of the St. Lawrence, in the St. Lawrence River and Gulf of St. Lawrence, when German U-boats were making ad hoc forays deep into Canadian waters. The convoy was found on 6 September 1942 by U-165, which then destroyed two ships from the convoy while U-517 destroyed three.

== Background ==
The March 1942 St. Lawrence Conference reviewed plans for Quebec-Sydney convoys for defence against U-boats in the Gulf of St. Lawrence and the St. Lawrence River as well as establishing a base at Gaspé, Quebec for the St. Lawrence patrol force, named Gaspé Force. However, by Spring 1942 the only deterrent active within the St. Lawrence were air patrols. In early May, the first U-boat arrived in the St. Lawrence, U-553. It entered the Gulf of St. Lawrence and sank two merchant vessels.

Following the attacks, all independent sailings were cancelled and the QS-SQ convoy system was adopted. As a result of merchant ship losses in the Atlantic Ocean, many slow lake freighters, vessels built for shipping on the Great Lakes, had been brought into service supplying St. Lawrence ports. The large number of slow ships prevented the adoption of slow and fast convoys of merchants, making all the convoys uniform in speed with a maximum of 14 knots (26 km/h; 16 mph). This did not stop U-boat attacks as U-132 sank three ships of QS-15 on 6 July. One ship was damaged in QS-19 by U-132 on 20 July and U-517 sank the US troopship Chatham on 27 August, followed by sinking a merchant vessel in Forteau Bay.

== Ships in the convoy ==
=== Allied merchant ships ===
A total of eight merchant vessels joined the convoy, either in Quebec City or later in the short voyage. The convoy comprised eight merchant vessels, split into two columns of four. The convoy departed from Bic Island, Quebec in the afternoon of 6 September. Aeas was transporting a load of timber and steel bound for the United Kingdom. Mount Pindus and Mount Taygetus were loaded with general cargo and had tanks lashed on deck for the United Kingdom. Oakton was carrying coal from Sandusky, Ohio bound for Corner Brook, Newfoundland.

Name	Flag	Tonnage (GRT)	Notes
Aeas (1915)	Greece	4,729	Sunk by U-165
Bencas (1943)	Norway	1,445	
Coniscliffe Hall (1928)	Canada	1,905	
John S. Pillsbury (1943)	United States	7,176	
Mount Pindus (1920)	Greece	5,729	Sunk by U-517
Mount Taygetus (1921)	Greece	3,286	Sunk by U-517
Oakton (1923)	Canada	1,272	Sunk by U-517
Penetang	Canada		

=== Convoy escort ===
Having learned from attacks in Canadian waters during the early weeks of the Battle of the St. Lawrence, a series of armed military ships escorted the convoy at various times during its short journey. The corvette Arrowhead, with the escort commander, Commander E.G. Skinner aboard and the minesweeper Truro were positioned port and starboard respectively of the lead merchant vessel. The motor launch Q-083 was situated in front of the convoy while Q-065 was positioned astern of the last merchant ship. Further to the naval escort, three Hudson light bombers operating from the airfield at Mont-Joli provided air cover during daylight hours.

Name	Flag	Type	Joined	Left
HMCS Arrowhead	Royal Canadian Navy	Flower-class corvette	6 September 1942	10 September 1942
HMCS Raccoon	Royal Canadian Navy	Armed yacht	6 September 1942	Sunk by U-165 on 7 September 1942
HMCS Truro	Royal Canadian Navy	Bangor-class minesweeper	6 September 1942	10 September 1942
HMCML Q-083	Royal Canadian Navy	Fairmile B motor launch	6 September 1942	10 September 1942
HMCML Q-065	Royal Canadian Navy	Fairmile B motor launch	6 September 1942	10 September 1942

== Battle ==
As the convoy passed with sight of the lighthouse at Cap-Chat, Quebec on 6 September, the convoy entered an area of reduced visibility and came under attack by the German submarine U-165, which had been shadowing the convoy. Waiting until after darkness had fallen, the submarine targeted Aeas first launching torpedoes around 23:00. Aeas was positioned at the northernmost merchant position in the convoy in the front row. Two torpedoes stuck the merchant vessel amidships, one in the fuel bunker, the other in the #3 hold. In response to the torpedo strike, Arrowhead went to full speed and began firing star shells. Truro began searching along the presumed path of the torpedo, finding nothing. Truro's asdic malfunctioned the night before the attack and was not fully operational and Q-083's asdic set had failed a few hours before the attack. As Aeas sank, the cold river water poured over the vessel's hot boilers, causing them to explode. Aeas sank in four minutes, roughly 5 miles (8.0 km) northwest of Cap-Chat. Four vessels of the convoy scattered after the explosion, seeking shelter in the shallower waters closer to shore. Truro was nearly hit by the fleeing merchants and was forced to take evasive action. Arrowhead too, retraced the suspected paths of the torpedo. Finding nothing, the corvette dropped four sets of depth charges. However, the German submarine had already moved on. After 40 minutes of searching Arrowhead returned to the site of Aeas' sinking and stopped to retrieve survivors. Raccoon screened the corvette during the operation. After 30 minutes spent recovering the remaining crew of the merchant vessel, Arrowhead returned to position at the head of convoy and Raccoon took up position astern of the convoy on the port side. 29 of 31 of Aeas' crew were recovered. By 0100 on 7 September, Arrowhead had returned to its position at the head of convoy.

At 0210, two detonations and a short blast of a whistle were heard throughout the convoy. (Note: Darlington & McKee have the time of the explosions at 12:10.) The escorts believed that it was Raccoon dropping depth charges on a suspected contact. Q-065 later reported seeing two columns of white water out in the Gulf of St. Lawrence. Arrowhead turned and sailed to Raccoon's position in the convoy defence but found no trace of the ship in the poor visibility and Raccoon was not equipped with a radio-telephone. Unable to find the ship, Arrowhead broke off the search as convoy escort took precedence and returned to its position at the head of the convoy.

The convoy sailed on until after daybreak, when the convoy was picked up again by a U-boat, this time U-517. Poor weather that morning prevented a planned air search of the area of Raccoon's disappearance. The corvette HMCS Shawinigan was dispatched to perform a sea search. On 7 September, Oakton which had been one of the merchants that had fled the convoy during the attack on Aeas, was found by an patrolling aircraft travelling along the coast of Gaspé. The aircraft ordered the merchant to rejoin the convoy. Not knowing where the convoy was, Q-083 was sent to escort the merchant back to the convoy.

U-517 took nearly the whole day to manoeveure itself into position after picking up transmissions of success against the convoy by U-165. By 15:00, rain had reduced visibility again and air cover was withdrawn. During that time, the minesweeper HMCS Vegreville, escorting the merchant Sarnolite, were ordered to join with the convoy. At 17:15, off Gaspé point, U-517 let the convoy pass over him before firing three torpedoes at three merchants which were sailing close to each other. The torpedoes struck the merchants Mount Pindus, Oakton and Mount Taygetus in rapid succession. Within 15 minutes of the torpedoing, all three merchants had sunk. Q-083 recovered 78 survivors in total from the three ships, later landing them in Gaspé. The other escorts, including Vegreville began dropping depth charges in an effort to prevent U-517 from targeting the last ship of the convoy Bencas. They made no contact with U-517; however, in an effort to draw off the escorts, U-517 launched a pillenwerfer, an underwater-launched noise maker meant to hide the U-boat from the asdic operators. U-517 suffered some damage to the outer hull from the depth charge attack, but made its escape. At 16:55 Arrowhead ordered the Fairmile motor launches to pick up survivors. Bencas was sent on to Gaspé escorted by Truro and Sarnolite by Vegreville. Arrowhead continued to search for the submarine in the approaches to Gaspé, supported by the Fairmiles and later joined by two aircraft, the minesweeper HMCS Chedabucto and corvettes HMCS Weyburn and HMCS Hepatica. Arrowhead and the Fairmiles returned to Gaspé at 20:30.

After the survivors were offloaded, the convoy was supposed to continue on to Sydney. However, the captain of Bencas refused to sail at night. Early on 8 September Sarnolite sailed with Vegreville for Sydney, followed by Bencas with Arrowhead and Truro after dawn. The convoy arrived at Sydney on 10 September.

== Aftermath ==
Beginning on 8 September, Gaspé Command intensified patrols in the Gulf of St. Lawrence. Twelve warships combed the waters of the Gaspé Passage until 10 September. RCAF Eastern Air Command sent out 46 patrols over the Gulf over the three days. No. 113 Squadron RCAF dispatched three Hudson light bombers to establish themselves at the training airfield at Chatham, New Brunswick. The improved coverage of the Gulf provided immediate results when a Hudson spotted a U-boat 22 miles (35 km) south of the eastern tip of Anticosti Island. The Hudson strafed and depth charged the U-boat, causing no damage. The attack on U-165 drove the submarine west, into the St. Lawrence River.

Further naval reinforcements were assigned to convoys in the Gulf of St. Lawrence as a result of the attacks. The escort of QS-33 had not proved strong enough, leading the Royal Canadian Navy to order two British River-class destroyers assigned to the Western Local Escort Force into the Gulf. They were equipped with improved radar and could locate submarines with greater ease. The sailing of QS-34 was delayed to allow for the arrival of the first destroyer. Raccoon's loss was declared on 10 September after all efforts to find and contact the vessel had been exhausted. Public knowledge of the sinking would not happen until 13 September, and even then, the public was not told where Raccoon had disappeared. (Note: Sarty has the Royal Canadian Navy announcing the sinking on 14 September.) Records later showed that U-165 claimed to have sunk Raccoon. Fragments of the ship and one body later washed up on shore.

The two German submarines continued to sink ships in the Gulf and St. Lawrence River, sinking the corvette HMCS Charlottetown on 11 September and on 15 and 16 September, three merchant vessels were sunk and a further two damaged. These losses and QS-33 contributed to the Canadian government's decision to close the Gulf and St. Lawrence River to overseas shipping. On 9 September, the Canadian government informed their Allies that all overseas shipping bound for ports on the St. Lawrence River be diverted to Saint John, New Brunswick, Sydney or Halifax, Nova Scotia. Furthermore, the government intended to shut down the QS series of convoys within two weeks.

== Bibliography ==
- Darlington, Robert A.; McKee, Fraser (1996). The Canadian Naval Chronicle 1939–1945: The Successes and Losses of the Canadian Navy in World War II. St. Catharines, Ontario: Vanwell Publishing. ISBN 1-55125-032-2.
- Greenfield, Nathan M. (2004). The Battle of the St. Lawrence: The Second World War in Canada. Toronto: HarperCollins Publishers Limited. ISBN 0-00-200664-2.
- Hadley, Michael L. (1985). U-Boats Against Canada: German Submarines in Canadian Waters. Montreal, Quebec and Kingston, Ontario: McGill-Queen's University Press. ISBN 0-7735-0811-2.
- Milner, Marc (2010). Canada's Navy: The First Century (Second ed.). Toronto: University of Toronto Press. ISBN 978-0-8020-9604-3.
- Sarty, Roger (2012). War in the St. Lawrence: The Forgotten U-Boat Battles on Canada's Shores. Toronto: Penguin Group. ISBN 978-0-670-06787-9.
- Schull, Joseph (1961). The Far Distant Ships: An Official Account of Canadian Naval Operations in the Second World War. Ottawa: Queen's Printer. OCLC 19974782.
