= Convoy LN-7 =

Trade convoy operated during Second World War

Convoy LN 7
- Part of World War II, Battle of the Atlantic, Battle of the St. Lawrence
Date	3 September 1942
Location	Gulf of St. Lawrence
Result	German victory

Belligerents
Germany	Canada; United Kingdom

Commanders and leaders
Karl Dönitz; Paul Hartwig	

Strength
1 U-boat	3 merchant ships 2 escorts

Casualties and losses
	1 ship sunk

Convoy LN-7 was a trade convoy of merchant ships during the Second World War. It was one of the numbered LN convoys from Quebec City to Goose Bay, Labrador. The convoy was found on 2 September 1942 by U-517, which then destroyed the merchant ship Donald Stewart early the next morning.

== Background ==
The March 1942 St. Lawrence Conference reviewed plans for convoy defence against U-boats in the Gulf of St. Lawrence and the St. Lawrence River as well as establishing a base at Gaspé, Quebec for the St. Lawrence patrol force, named Gaspé Force. However, by Spring 1942 the only deterrent active within the St. Lawrence were air patrols. In early May, the first U-boat arrived in the St. Lawrence, U-553. It entered the Gulf of St. Lawrence and sank two merchant vessels.

Following the attacks, all independent sailings were cancelled and a convoy system was adopted. As a result of merchant ship losses in the Atlantic Ocean, many slow lake freighters, vessels built for shipping on the Great Lakes, had been brought into service supplying St. Lawrence ports. The large number of slow ships prevented the adoption of slow and fast convoys of merchants, making all the convoys uniform in speed with a maximum of 14 knots (26 km/h; 16 mph).

In 1942, there were increased demands for the protection of shipping as new convoy systems were created. Protection of convoys bringing material and workers to Goose Bay, Labrador for the construction of a large Royal Canadian Air Force base was required. The convoys would depart Quebec and bring the material to the drop off point at Hamilton Inlet in Labrador and the return trip would be made by the now-empty vessels. To provide escort for the new convoys, two Flower-class corvettes were reassigned from tanker escort duty in July 1942.

The German submarine U-517, commanded by Kapitänleutnant Paul Hartwig, had entered the Gulf of St. Lawrence on the night of 26–27 August 1942. On 27 August, U-517 torpedoed the United States Army transport Chatham in the Strait of Belle Isle. On 28 August, the U-boat sank the abandoned hulk Arlyn in the strait. These attacks, and those by U-165 led to the cancellation of the sailing of LN-6, which was composed of the corvette Trail and the merchant vessels Ericus and Donald Stewart.

== Ships in the convoy ==
=== Merchant ships ===
LN-7 was composed of three merchant vessels. Canatco had sailed from Quebec with the escort Shawinigan with Ericus, Donald Stewart and the escort Trail joining from convoy LN 6 off Gaspé which had been cancelled after U-boat attacks in the Strait of Belle Isle. Donald Stewart was a Great Lakes freighter carrying cement and 55-gallon drums of aviation gasoline lashed to its deck. After the groups had merged, the three merchant ships sailed in a line abreast.

Merchant ships
Name	Flag	Tonnage (GRT)	Notes
Canatco (1919)	Canada	2,414	
Donald Stewart (1923)	Canada	1,781	Sunk by U-517
Ericus (1919)	United Kingdom	2,215	

=== Escorts ===
Shawinigan was the initial escort assigned to the convoy. Trail joined from convoy LN-6 after it had been cancelled due to U-boat attacks in the Strait of Belle Isle. Once the two groups had merged, a corvette was positioned ahead of the convoy on each flank.

Escort ships
Name	Flag	Type	Notes
HMCS Trail (1940)	Royal Canadian Navy	Flower-class corvette	Escort 1 September-5 September
HMCS Shawinigan (1941)	Royal Canadian Navy	Flower-class corvette	Escort 31 August-5 September

== Battle ==
On 1 September Trail, Ericus and Donald Stewart departed Gaspé to join LN-7 as it passed on its way to Hamilton Inlet. The convoy was spotted by U-517 off Anticosti Island on 2 September, but was prevented from attacking right away by the appearance of a Canso aircraft from No. 117 Squadron RCAF. Hartwig then navigated ahead of the convoy, intending to attack later in the day.

NL-6, comprising the Flower-class corvette HMCS Weyburn, the Bangor-class minesweeper HMCS Clayoquot and three empty merchant vessels on their return trip to Quebec heading in the opposite direction. The escorts of the two convoys were concentrating on keeping the convoys apart. It was during this meeting at 03:00 on 3 September that U-517 commenced a surface attack on the convoy, firing into convoy LN-7 from its southern flank. As the submarine fired two torpedoes, it was caught on the surface by Weyburn. The corvette sought to ram, but not being fast enough to catch up to the surfaced submarine, opened fire with its 4-inch (102 mm) forward gun. This action forced Hartwig to submerge. Weyburn then made a depth charge attack and sought to find the U-boat using its asdic, but made no contact.

One torpedo struck the merchant Donald Stewart forward of the stern, the other missed. The torpedo that struck ignited the gasoline causing flames to rise from the merchant "40 feet (12.2 m) and spreading from stem to stern." 16 of 19 crew were recovered by Shawinigan with Clayoquot and Trail screening the operation. (Note: Hadley has the crew recovered by Trail and landed in Quebec.) Hartwig had decided against a second attack on the convoys following Weyburn's attempt to ram and remained submerged.

== Aftermath ==
U-517 continued to track LN-7 towards the Strait of Belle Isle. Following U-517's attack, air cover was strengthened in the area and beginning on 3 September, a Digby bomber from No. 10 Squadron RCAF was deployed to the area. The Digby caught U-517 on the surface and dropped four depth charges, missing with all of them. One of the depth charges blew up on contact with the water and fragments damaged the wing of the aircraft. The U-boat submerged before the depth charges hit and suffered no damage. Thirty minutes after the air attack, Trail arrived on scene and U-517 and turned towards Anticosti Island. Further U-boat attacks on convoys, with the strongest on 6 September on Convoy QS-33, transiting the Gulf and St. Lawrence River would force the Royal Canadian Navy to dedicate more powerful ships to convoy escort. On 9 September, the Royal Canadian Navy informed the Allies that St. Lawrence ports were to be closed to international shipping.

== Bibliography ==
- Greenfield, Nathan M. (2004). The Battle of the St. Lawrence: The Second World War in Canada. Toronto: HarperCollins Publishers Limited. ISBN 0-00-200664-2.
- Hadley, Michael L. (1985). U-Boats Against Canada: German Submarines in Canadian Waters. Montreal, Quebec and Kingston, Ontario: McGill-Queen's University Press. ISBN 0-7735-0811-2.
- Milner, Marc (2010). Canada's Navy: The First Century (Second ed.). Toronto: University of Toronto Press. ISBN 978-0-8020-9604-3.
- Sarty, Roger (2012). War in the St. Lawrence: The Forgotten U-Boat Battles on Canada's Shores. Toronto: Penguin Group. ISBN 978-0-670-06787-9.
- Schull, Joseph (1961). The Far Distant Ships: An Official Account of Canadian Naval Operations in the Second World War. Ottawa: Queen's Printer. OCLC 19974782.
- Tennent, Alan J. (2001). British and Commonwealth Merchant Ship Losses to Axis Submarines, 1939–1945. Stoud, UK: Sutton. ISBN 0-7509-2760-7.
