= HMCS Arrowhead =

Flower-class corvette

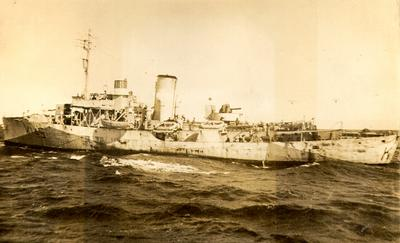
- HMCS Arrowhead

History

United Kingdom
- Name: Arrowhead
- Namesake: Sagittaria
- Ordered: 22 January 1940
- Builder: Marine Industries Ltd., Sorel
- Laid down: 11 April 1940
- Launched: 8 August 1940
- Commissioned: 22 November 1940
- Out of service: 15 May 1941 – loaned to Canada
- Identification: Pennant number: K145
- Fate: Loaned to Canada 1941; returned 1945; sold 1947

Canada
- Name: Arrowhead
- Acquired: Loaned from United Kingdom
- Commissioned: 15 May 1941
- Out of service: paid off 27 June 1945
- Identification: Pennant number: K145
- Honours and awards: Atlantic 1941–45, Gulf of St. Lawrence 1942, 1944
- Fate: Returned to the United Kingdom 1945

General characteristics
- Class & type: Flower-class corvette (original)
- Displacement: 950 long tons (970 t)
- Length: 205 ft 1 in (62.51 m) o/a
- Beam: 33 ft 1 in (10.08 m)
- Draught: 13 ft 5 in (4.09 m)
- Propulsion: single shaft; 2 × Scotch boilers; 1 × 4-cylinder triple-expansion reciprocating steam engine; 2,750 ihp (2,050 kW)
- Speed: 16 knots (30 km/h; 18 mph)
- Range: 3,450 nmi (6,390 km; 3,970 mi) at 12 kn (22 km/h; 14 mph)
- Complement: 47
- Sensors & processing systems: 1 × SW1C or 2C radar; 1 × Type 123A or Type 127DV sonar
- Armament: 1 × BL 4-inch (101.6 mm) Mk.IX single gun; 2 × .50 cal machine gun (twin); 2 × Lewis .303 cal machine gun (twin); 2 × Mk.II depth charge throwers; 2 × depth charge rails with 40 depth charges; originally fitted with minesweeping gear, later removed

HMCS Arrowhead was a Flower-class corvette that was originally commissioned by the Royal Navy but served primarily with the Royal Canadian Navy (RCN) during the Second World War. She fought in the Battle of the Atlantic and the Battle of the St. Lawrence as a convoy escort. The vessel was named for sagittaria, which is an aquatic water plant that is sometimes known as arrowhead. Following the war, the ship was sold for mercantile use as a whaling ship and renamed Southern Larkspur. The vessel was broken up for scrap in 1959.

== Design and description ==
Flower-class corvettes like Arrowhead serving with the Royal Canadian Navy during the Second World War were different from earlier and more traditional sail-driven corvettes. The Flower-class corvettes originated from a need that arose in 1938 to expand the Royal Navy following the Munich Crisis. A design request went out for a small escort for coastal convoys. Based on a traditional whaler-type design, the initial Canadian ships of the Flower class had a standard displacement of 950 long tons (970 t). They were 205 feet 1 inch (62.51 m) long overall with a beam of 33 feet 1 inch (10.08 m) and a maximum draught of 13 feet 5 inches (4.09 m). The initial 1939–1940 corvettes were powered by a four-cylinder vertical triple expansion engine powered by steam from two Scotch boilers turning one three-bladed propeller rated at 2,800 indicated horsepower (2,100 kW). The Scotch boilers were replaced with water-tube boilers in later 1939–1940 and 1940–1941 Programme ships. The corvettes had a maximum speed of 16 knots (30 km/h; 18 mph). This gave them a range of 3,450 nautical miles (6,390 km; 3,970 mi) at 12 knots (22 km/h; 14 mph). The vessels were extremely wet.

The Canadian Flower-class vessels were initially armed with a Mk IX BL 4-inch (102 mm) gun forward on a CP 1 mounting and carried 100 rounds per gun. The corvettes were also armed with a QF Vickers 2-pounder (40 mm, 1.6 in) gun on a bandstand aft, two single-mounted .303 Vickers machine guns or Browning 0.5-calibre machine guns for anti-aircraft defence and two twin-mounted .303 Lewis machine guns, usually sited on bridge wings. For anti-submarine warfare, they mounted two depth charge throwers and initially carried 25 depth charges. The corvettes were designed with a Type 123 ASDIC sonar set installed. The Flower-class ships had a complement of 47 officers and ratings. The Royal Canadian Navy initially ordered 54 corvettes in 1940 and these were fitted with Mark II Oropesa minesweeping gear used for destroying contact mines. Part of the depth charge rails were made portable so the minesweeping gear could be utilised.

=== Modifications ===
In Canadian service the vessels were altered due to experience with the design's deficiencies. The galley was moved further back in the ship and the mess and sleeping quarters combined. A direction-finding set was installed and enlarged bilge keels were installed to reduce rolling. After the first 35–40 corvettes had been constructed, the foremast was shifted aft of the bridge and the mainmast was eliminated. Corvettes were first fitted with basic SW-1 and SW-2 CQ surface warning radar, notable for their fishbone-like antenna and reputation for failure in poor weather or in the dark. The compass house was moved further aft and the open-type bridge was situated in front of it. The ASDIC hut was moved in front and to a lower position on the bridge. The improved Type 271 radar was placed aft, with some units receiving Type 291 radar for air search. The minesweeping gear, a feature of the first 54 corvettes, was removed. Most Canadian Flower-class corvettes had their forecastles extended which improved crew accommodation and seakeeping. Furthermore, the sheer and flare of the bow was increased, which led to an enlarged bridge. This allowed for the installation of Oerlikon 20 mm (0.8 in) cannon, replacing the Browning and Vickers machine guns. Some of the corvettes were rearmed with Hedgehog anti-submarine mortars. The complements of the ships grew throughout the war rising from the initial 47 to as many as 104.

== Construction and career ==
At the opening of the Second World War, the Canadian shipbuilding industry was incapable of building large, sophisticated warships. However, Canada required new large, advanced escort ships for national defence and sought to acquire Tribal-class destroyers for the Royal Canadian Navy. In a deal with the Royal Navy, Canada would construct ten Flower-class corvettes in exchange for two Tribal-class destroyers. The vessel was ordered in January 1940 under the 1939–40 Flower class programme by the Royal Navy from Marine Industries Ltd. in Sorel, Quebec. Arrowhead was laid down on 11 April 1940 and launched on 8 August 1940. As the ship was ordered by the British, the ship kept its flower name Arrowhead, an aquatic water plant known by its Latin name sagittaria. The corvette was commissioned on 22 November later that year by the Royal Navy.

=== Royal Navy ===
After commissioning Arrowhead sailed to Sunderland in January 1941 to fully fit out which took two months. There were delays in the arrival of essential equipment for the British corvettes in Canada and some of them sailed without their main armament as they departed from Canadian dockyards as soon as they were fit for the Atlantic crossing. Due to a lack of ships and a surplus of manpower, the Royal Canadian Navy offered to crew the ships until mid-1941 when enough of the Canadian corvettes would become available. Then in April 1941, the British Admiralty requested that Canada take over the ships permanently. Arrowhead worked up at Tobermory and joined EG-4 of the Royal Navy's Iceland Command taking part in the Battle of the Atlantic. The ship commissioned into the Royal Canadian Navy on 15 May 1941.

=== Royal Canadian Navy ===
In June 1941, after commissioning in the RCN, Arrowhead joined the Newfoundland Escort Force and spent the majority of 1941 escorting convoys from St. John's to Iceland. On 1 September 1941, the convoy escort groups (EG) were re-organised and the ship was made part of EG 18. In early September convoy SC 43 which EG 18 was escorting was detoured south to avoid the German wolfpack "Markgraf". On 18 September, the convoy SC 44 came under attack by German U-boats. Initial German attacks sank four of the merchant vessels. Arrowhead is one of three warships sent to reinforce the convoy, which prevent further sinkings.

In late December, Arrowhead was sent to Charleston for a refit. She returned to Halifax in February 1942 and did one more cross-Atlantic convoy before being reassigned to Western Local Escort Force (WLEF). In July she joined the Gulf Escort Force and participated in the Battle of the St. Lawrence. On 31 August the U-boats U-165 and U-517 entered the St. Lawrence River. On 6 September, the convoy QS 33, escorted by Arrowhead, HMCS Truro, two motor launches and the armed yacht HMCS Raccoon was spotted by U-517. Arrowhead detected U-517 and attempted to sink the submarine unsuccessfully. However, while dealing with U-517, U-165 snuck past the escort and sank three merchant ships comprising 4,729 GRT and Raccoon. On 15 September U-517 attacked a second convoy escorted by Arrowhead, the minesweeper HMCS Vegreville and three motor launches. U-517 sank two ships from the convoy. The following day, the convoy came under attack by U-165 which sank two more ships for a total loss of 10,292 GRT along with another merchant vessel that was torpedoed but remained afloat.

Arrowhead spent the final months of 1942 bouncing around commands, joining Halifax Force in October. While with Halifax Force, Arrowhead was one of three warships tasked with escorting NL 9. The U-boat U-69 attacked the convoy, sinking the ferry Caribou. The corvette returned to WLEF at the end of November and stayed with the unit until August 1944. In June 1943, when WLEF introduced dedicated escort groups, Arrowhead was first assigned to group W-7 before transferring to W-1 in December.

During her period with WLEF, Arrowhead had two major refits, one in Charleston in the spring of 1943 and one in Baltimore in May 1944 where her forecastle was extended. After returning to service she was assigned to Quebec-Labrador convoys in September 1944. In December of that year, Arrowhead was reassigned to Western Escort Force's Escort Group W-8 and used on the "Triangle Run" between Boston/New York, Halifax and St. John's until May 1945.

Arrowhead was assigned to convoy HX 358 with three other loaned corvettes, Eyebright, Hepatica and Trillium. After arrival at Milford Haven, on 27 June 1945 she was paid off and returned to the Royal Navy. For service in the Battle of the Atlantic, Arrowhead earned the battle honour "Atlantic 1941–45" and earned the battle honour "Gulf of St. Lawrence 1942, 1944" for service in the Battle of the St. Lawrence.

=== Post-war career ===
In 1947 Arrowhead was sold for conversion to a whale-catcher with a gross register tonnage of 757 tons, emerging in 1948. She was renamed Southern Larkspur. Eventually, the vessel was broken up at Odense, Denmark in December 1959 by H.I. Hansen.
