= HMCS Truro =

History

Canada
- Name: Truro
- Namesake: Truro, Nova Scotia
- Builder: Davie Shipbuilding, Lauzon
- Laid down: 20 March 1941
- Launched: 5 June 1942
- Commissioned: 27 August 1942
- Decommissioned: 31 July 1945
- Identification: Pennant number: J268
- Honours and awards: Atlantic 1942-45, Gulf of St. Lawrence 1942, 1944
- Fate: Sold for mercantile conversion 1946; Broken up, 1964

General characteristics
- Class & type: Bangor-class minesweeper
- Displacement: 592 long tons (601 t)
- Length: 162 ft (49.4 m)
- Beam: 28 ft (8.5 m)
- Draught: 8.25 ft (2.51 m)
- Propulsion: 2 shafts, 9-cylinder diesel, 2,000 bhp (1,500 kW)
- Speed: 16 knots (30 km/h)
- Complement: 83
- Armament: 1 × QF 12-pounder 12 cwt naval gun; 1 × QF 2-pounder Mark VIII; 2 × QF 20 mm Oerlikon guns; 40 depth charges as escort

HMCS Truro (pennant J268) was a Bangor-class minesweeper that served with the Royal Canadian Navy during the Second World War. The minesweeper entered service in 1942 and took part in the Battle of the Atlantic and the Battle of the St. Lawrence. Following the war, the vessel was transferred to the Royal Canadian Mounted Police and renamed Herchmer. In 1946, Herchmer was sold for mercantile conversion and reappeared as Gulf Mariner. The ship was abandoned in 1964 on the Fraser River shore after plans for conversion to a suction dredger failed. The abandoned hulk was broken up.

== Design and description ==
The Bangor class was initially to be a scaled down minesweeper design of the Halcyon class in Royal Navy service. However, due to the difficulty procuring diesel engines led to the small number of the diesel version being completed. The ships displaced 592 long tons (601 t) standard and 690 long tons (700 t) fully loaded. They were 162 feet (49.4 m) long with a beam of 28 feet (8.5 m) and a draught of 8 feet 3 inches (2.51 m). However, the size of the ship led to criticisms of their being too cramped for magnetic or acoustic minesweeping gear. This may have been due to all the additions made during the war with the installation of ASDIC, radar and depth charges.

The Bangor class came in two versions. Truro was of the diesel-powered version, being equipped with a 9-cylinder diesel engine driving two shafts that produced 2,000 brake horsepower (1,500 kW). This gave the ship a maximum speed of 16.5 knots (30.6 km/h). The vessels carried 65 long tons (66 t) of oil. The vessels had a complement of 6 officers and 77 ratings.

The Canadian diesel-powered Bangors were armed with a single quick-firing (QF) 12-pounder 12 cwt gun mounted forward. (Note: "Cwt" is the abbreviation for hundredweight, 20 cwt referring to the weight of the gun.) The ships were also fitted with a QF 2-pounder Mark VIII gun aft and were eventually fitted with single-mounted QF 20 mm Oerlikon guns on the bridge wings. For those ships assigned to convoy duty, they were armed with two depth charge launchers and two chutes for the 40 depth charges they carried.

== Operational history ==
The minesweeper was ordered as part of the 1940–1941 construction programme. The ship's keel was laid down on 20 March 1941 by Davie Shipbuilding at their yard in Lauzon, Quebec. Named for a community in Nova Scotia, Truro was launched on 5 June 1942. The ship was commissioned on 27 August 1942 at Quebec City.

After arriving at Halifax, Nova Scotia in September, the minesweeper was assigned to the Western Local Escort Force as a convoy escort. Deployed to escort convoys through the Gulf of St. Lawrence, the Quebec – Sydney convoy QS 33 sailed on 6 September 1942 escorted by the corvette Arrowhead, Truro, the armed yacht Raccoon and two Fairmile motor launches. At 2300, the convoy, which had been trailed by U-boats, was attacked by U-165. The Greek freighter Aeas was hit twice with torpedoes and sank in five minutes. At 0210, explosions sounding like depth charges were heard in the vicinity of Raccoon's location, but the lack of communication led the other escorts to believe that it was nothing significant. In reality, U-165 had torpedoed the armed yacht. There were no survivors. On 7 September the convoy came under attack by a second U-boat, U-517. At 1801, the submarine fired three torpedoes, each sinking a merchant vessel. Arrowhead and Truro counterattacked, but only succeeding in keeping the submarine down. (Note: Rohwer has HMCS Vegreville as the Bangor-class escort during the attack by U-517) In June 1943, the minesweeper joined the escort group W4.

The minesweeper remained with W4 until May 1944 when Truro transferred to Sydney Force, the patrol and escort force operating from Sydney, Nova Scotia. In December, the minesweeper began a refit at Lunenburg, Nova Scotia that took until February 1945 to complete. Following the refit, the ship was briefly allocated to Halifax Force, the patrol and escort force operating from Halifax before rejoining Sydney Force. The ship remained with Sydney Force until June 1945.

Truro was paid off on 31 July 1945 at Sydney and transferred to the Royal Canadian Mounted Police to become Herchmer on 3 August 1945. The vessel was sold on 6 August 1946 for mercantile conversion and the vessel reappeared as the 609 GRT Gulf Mariner. The merchant vessel continued in service until 1964, when plans to convert the ship to a suction dredger failed. Gulf Mariner was abandoned along the shore of the Fraser River and broken up in Canada in 1964. (Note: The Miramar Ship Index states that the ship was broken up in 1965.)
