= No. 113 Squadron RCAF =

- Active: 1937–1939, 1942–1944
- Disbanded: 10 August 1944
- Country: Canada
- Allegiance: Canada
- Branch: Royal Canadian Air Force
- Role: Bomber Reconnaissance
- Part of: RCAF Eastern Air Command
- Garrison/HQ: RCAF Station Yarmouth, RCAF Station Chatham, RCAF Station Torbay
- Engagements: Second World War: Battle of the Atlantic; Battle of the St. Lawrence
- Battle honours: North-West Atlantic 1942–1944

Insignia
- Squadron Codes: BT (Feb–May 1942), LM (Jun–Oct 1942), Nil (Apr 1943 – Aug 1944)

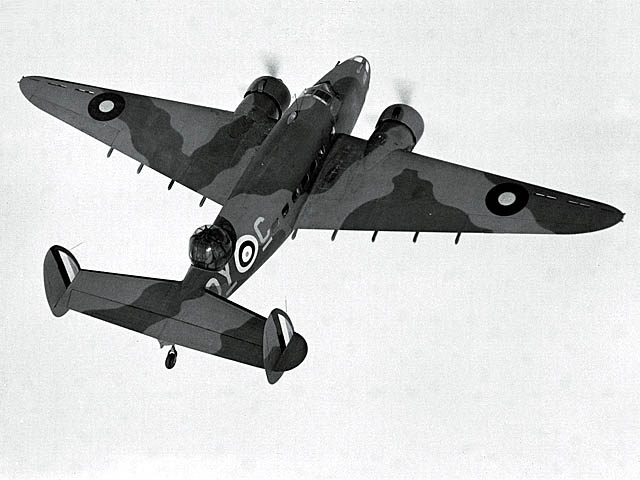
An RCAF Lockheed Hudson

No. 113 (Bomber Reconnaissance) Squadron was a Royal Canadian Air Force squadron that was active during the Second World War. It was originally formed as an Army Co-operation squadron and then a fighter squadron before being disbanded in 1939 and then reformed in 1942. It was primarily used in an anti-submarine role and was based on the east coast of Canada and Newfoundland. The squadron flew the Lockheed Hudson and Lockheed Ventura before disbanding on 10 August 1944.

== Sinking of U-754 ==
On 31 July 1942, Hudson 625 commanded by Squadron Leader N.E. Small was conducting a patrol in the vicinity of Sable Island when it sighted U-754 on the surface. On the first pass, the aircraft dropped depth charges just as the submarine began to dive. A second pass found the boat just under the water, apparently damaged by the depth charges. On the third pass, the aircraft fired its front guns at the boat's conning tower. The plane then observed the damaged boat for 55 minutes before an explosion seemed to finally settle the matter. U-754 was sunk with all hands lost. For this achievement, Small was posthumously awarded the Distinguished Flying Cross in January 1943.

== Actions in the St. Lawrence ==
In September 1942, Eastern Air Command stationed a detachment of 113 Squadron aircraft at RCAF Station Chatham as the "Special Submarine Hunting Detachment" in order to provide air cover for convoys in the Gulf of St. Lawrence. U-boats had begun to infiltrate the St. Lawrence that May, and had already scored some notable victories without a loss, however, the increased air cover allowed Canadian forces to mount a vigorous anti-submarine defense. The first attack by a 113 Squadron aircraft on a U-boat took place near Anticosti Island on 9 September, when Pilot Officer R.S. Keetley and his crew dove in on U-165, but did not cause any critical damage. On 16 September, Keetley launched an attack on U-517, but despite getting a depth charge lodged on its deck, the U-boat escaped unharmed. On 24–25 September, 113 Squadron registered three attacks on seven sightings on U-517, plus a further attack on 29 September. Despite considerable damage from these attacks, both U-517 and U-165 departed the Gulf. Flying Officer M.J. Bélanger, who had conducted three of the last four attacks on U-517 would later be awarded the Distinguished Flying Cross.

== See also ==
- HMCS Charlottetown (1941)
- HMCS Raccoon
- No. 10 Squadron RCAF
