= HMS Racoon =

Six ships of the Royal Navy have borne the name HMS Racoon, after the raccoon:

- HMS Racoon (1782) was a 14-gun brig-sloop. In 1782 she was under the command of Edmund Nagle. The French frigates Aigle and Gloire captured her off the Delaware River in September 1782. The very next day a small British squadron, led by Captain G.K. Elphinston in Warwick, chased the three vessels up the river. The British were able to capture Aigle, and with her all of Racoon's crew. Racoon herself escaped and was last listed at Rochefort in 1785.
- HMS Racoon (1795) was a 16-gun brig-sloop launched in 1795 and broken up in 1806.
- HMS Racoon (1808) was an 18-gun sloop launched in 1808. She was used as a convict ship from 1819 and was sold in 1838.
- HMS Racoon (1857) was a wood screw sloop launched in 1857 and broken up in 1877.
- HMS Racoon (1887) was a torpedo cruiser launched in 1887 and sold in 1905.
- HMS Racoon (1910) was a Beagle-class destroyer launched in 1910 and wrecked in 1918.

== See also ==
- HMCS Raccoon was the former civilian yacht Halonia before being commissioned into the RCN in 1940. U-165 sank her in 1942.
