= Convoy QS-15 =

Convoy during naval battles of the Second World War

Convoy QS 15
- Part of World War II, Battle of the Atlantic, Battle of the St. Lawrence
Date	5–8 July 1942
Location	St. Lawrence River, near Cap-Chat
Result	German tactical victory

Belligerents
Kriegsmarine	Royal Canadian Navy; Greece; Norway; United Kingdom; Panama; Belgium (Kingdom of Yugoslavia) Yugoslavia

Commanders and leaders
Karl Dönitz; Ernst Vogelsang	J.P. Fraser

Strength
	12 merchant ships 1 escort

Casualties and losses
1 U-boat damaged	3 ships sunk

Convoy QS-15 was a trade convoy of merchant ships during the Second World War. It was one of the numbered QS Convoys which travelled from Québec to Sydney, Nova Scotia. The convoy was attacked in the early weeks of the Battle of the St. Lawrence, in the St. Lawrence River and Gulf of St. Lawrence, when German U-boats were making ad hoc forays deep into Canadian waters. The convoy was found on 6 July 1942 by U-132, which then sank three ships. U-132 was attacked and damaged by the convoy escort ship HMCS Drummondville.

== Background ==
The March 1942 St. Lawrence Conference reviewed plans for Quebec–Sydney (QS) convoys for defence against U-boats in the Gulf of St. Lawrence and the St. Lawrence River and establishing a base at Gaspé, Quebec for the St. Lawrence patrol force, named Gaspé Force. However, by spring 1942 the only deterrent active within the St. Lawrence were air patrols. In early May, the first U-boat arrived in the St. Lawrence, U-553. It entered the Gulf of St. Lawrence and sank two merchant vessels.

Following the attacks, all independent sailings were cancelled and the QS-SQ convoy system was adopted. As a result of merchant ship losses in the Atlantic Ocean, many slow lake freighters, vessels built for shipping on the Great Lakes, had been brought into service supplying St. Lawrence ports. The large number of slow ships prevented the adoption of slow and fast convoys of merchants, making all the convoys uniform in speed at a maximum of 14 knots (26 km/h; 16 mph).

The German submarine U-132 had departed its base in France on 10 June. On 13 June, the submarine came under intense attack by an unknown corvette, suffering damage significant enough to be ordered home. However, the submarine's commander, Ernst Vogelsang, insisted that he could continue his mission. Arriving in the St. Lawrence area in mid-June the submarine was then ordered to replenish from one of the German supply submarines off the Atlantic coast. U-132 returned to the St. Lawrence via the Cabot Strait and was directed to attack shipping west of Anticosti Island. U-132 entered the St. Lawrence on 30 June, developing engine problems from the attack by the corvette earlier in the patrol. The submarine continued to patrol, submerging to avoid the Royal Canadian Air Force air cover over the area.

== Ships in the convoy ==
=== Allied merchant ships ===
A total of twelve merchant vessels joined the convoy, either at Quebec City or later in the short voyage. The convoy sailing formation was two rows of five followed by one row of two merchant vessels. The entire convoy normally covered 800 feet (240 m) in total, but lax station keeping by the merchant vessels led to the convoy spreading over a 3-mile (4.8 km) stretch of water. The convoy's maximum speed was 5.9 knots (11 km/h). Anastassios Pateras was carrying trucks, grain and general cargo to the United Kingdom. Hainaut was loaded with general cargo, also bound for the United Kingdom. Dinaric was carrying steel and timber. The convoy commodore, a civilian commander of the merchant vessels, had his flag aboard Fjordheim.

List of merchant vessels
Name	Flag	Tonnage (GRT)	Notes
Anastassios Pateras (1914)	Greece	3,382	Sunk by U-132
Carmelfjell (1935)	Norway	1,334	
Dinaric (1919)	United Kingdom	1,905	Sunk by U-132
Fjordheim (1930)	Norway	4,115	
Hainaut (1905)	Belgium	5,729	Sunk by U-132
Kalliopi (1910)	Greece	5,965	
Panchito (1910)	Panama	4,015	
Sloga (1913)	Yugoslavia	4,323	

=== Convoy escort ===
As with other convoys in the early weeks of the Battle of the St. Lawrence, the escort was a single armed military ship. Drummondville was on its sixth escort mission as part of Gaspé Force, having been one of the five Bangor-class minesweepers assigned to the unit in May 1942. All of the missions had been commanded by Drummondville's commanding officer, Lieutenant J.P. Fraser. Additionally, the convoy was to have air cover provided by Royal Canadian Air Force Canso aircraft operating from the airfield at Gaspé. Their arrival was delayed, as they were already covering convoy SQ-16 transiting the Gulf of St. Lawrence.

Name	Flag	Type	Joined	Left
HMCS Drummondville	Royal Canadian Navy	Bangor-class minesweeper	5 July 1942	8 July 1942

== Battle ==
The convoy departed Bic Island in the afternoon of 5 July 1942 heading for Sydney, Nova Scotia. While transiting the St. Lawrence River, a Fairmile motor launch on patrol from Rimouski to Gaspé temporarily joined the convoy to aid Drummondville on forcing the merchant vessels into their places in the convoy. U-132 picked up the convoy at 19:20 off Les Méchins, Quebec on 5 July. However, the commander of U-132 waited until 22:30 to surface and pursue it. QS-15 met the inbound convoy SQ-16 during the night and passed to the south, giving the German submarine captain the "impression of overlapping vessels".

At 12:21 on 6 July, U-132 was 4,900 feet (1,500 m) south of the southernmost ship of the front row of the convoy off Cap-Chat, Quebec and fired four torpedoes. Two torpedoes missed, one struck the freighter Anastassios Pateras in the starboard side, hitting between the cross bunker and the stokehold. Anastassios Pateras was the second ship in the front row. The second torpedo struck Hainaut on the starboard side creating a 4-foot (1.2 m) hole in Hold No. 2 two to three minutes after the first explosion. Hainaut was situated at the northern end of the front row. Anastassios Pateras sank within ten minutes of the torpedo strike, Hainaut took twenty.

After the first explosion, the convoy scattered, with most turning around and heading for Rimouski. Neither of the ships hit by torpedoes fired their rockets signalling torpedo strikes. This led to confusion among the convoy, with Lieutenant Fraser believing the explosions a result of the Fairmile, which had never signalled its departure, had begun dropping depth charges on a contact. Once he discovered the Fairmile was no longer with the convoy, the distance between the two torpedoed ships led Lieutenant Fraser to believe two U-boats were operating against the convoy. Twenty-six of the twenty-nine crew escaped Anastassios Pateras and made for shore, arriving four hours later at Cap-Chat. Immediately following the explosion aboard Hainaut, the crew were ordered to the lifeboats. Forty of the forty-one crew survived the sinking and were recovered on 7 July at 07:45.

Drummondville fired three star shells and closed with Fjordheim, which had been sailing in the first row next to Hainaut. The convoy commodore believed that Panchito in the second row had also been torpedoed, but this was not the case. At 12:58 and 01:01, U-132 fired torpedoes at distant vessels, scoring no hits. At 01:45, the submarine closed with Dinaric, which had continued on its original course for Sydney. Dinaric was carrying the vice-commodore of the convoy and was struck amidships on the starboard side by U-132's torpedo. The vessel immediately began to list. Thirty-four of the crew of thirty-eight escaped the vessel.

On hearing the Dinaric explosion, Drummondville raced towards the sinking ship, firing a star shell. U-132 was caught in the illumination. Drummondville moved to ram the submarine, with U-132 not diving until the minesweeper was almost on top of it. Drummondville dropped three depth charges over the diving submarine. As U-132 dived, the submarine encountered a variable density layer within the water, keeping the submarine from dropping to a safe depth. Drummondville turned to ram again, but this time the submarine began to sink faster. This was a result of Vogelsang opening his forward torpedo tubes in order to decrease the submarine's buoyancy. Drummondville dropped three more depth charges, exacerbating the damage caused earlier in U-132's patrol. The main line for the operation of the buoyancy tanks had been severed causing the submarine to sink to 185 feet (56 m), near crush depth for U-132. Efforts aboard the submarine to rise to a safer depth failed and the submarine remained near 180 feet (55 m) below the surface. To reach the surface, Vogelsang blew out his buoyancy tanks. The submarine reached the surface and fled the area at 9.2 knots (17 km/h) using its diesel engines. Drummondville meanwhile had been attempting to gather the merchants into a convoy again against what he believed to be the threat of a second submarine. At 03:30, the noise from U-132's diesels was picked up by Drummondville's asdic. Drummondville sped towards the contact and fired star shell, finding nothing with U-132 just beyond range of the illumination. The minesweeper dropped depth charges before returning to the merchant vessels.

== Aftermath ==
U-132 withdrew into shallower waters and submerged, resting on the bottom of the St. Lawrence River, effecting repairs. Once the repairs were completed, Vogelsang took his submarine out of the St. Lawrence area into the Belle Isle Strait. Finding all the merchant vessels heavily escorted in the area, U-132 was given the chance to withdraw on 12 July. Instead, on 20 July, Vogelsang attacked convoy QS-19, sinking another merchant. The submarine departed the St. Lawrence during the night of 20–21 July and joined the pursuit of the ocean convoy ON 112, sinking another merchant. The submarine returned to its base in France on 16 August.

Following the submarine's withdrawal, Drummondville returned to the site of Dinaric's torpedoing and recovered the vessel's survivors. The minesweeper then set about trying to reassemble the convoy. On 6 July at 06:00, Drummondville spotted four merchant ships that had fled the convoy. A heavy fog covered the area as the minesweeper sought to form them into a convoy and Drummondville lost contact with three of them. Drummondville and the remaining merchant vessel arrived at Sydney on 7 July. The minesweeper Chedabucto and the armed yacht Raccoon were dispatched to aid Drummondville in defending the convoy. While in transit, Raccoon came upon the three vessels Drummondville had lost contact with in the fog and escorted them to Sydney. Chedabucto continued to search for merchant vessels belonging to the convoy.

A general alert was sounded along the Atlantic Coast concerning the attack at 02:40. Fog over the Gaspé airfield prevented operations by the Canso aircraft. At Mont-Joli, Quebec a training airfield was clear of fog, but training aircraft of No. 130 Squadron RCAF were the only ones available. Obsolete Curtiss Kittyhawk fighters were being used by the squadron and none were provided ammunition before departing. Four aircraft under the command of Squadron Leader J.A.J. Chevrier patrolled the Cap-Chat area beginning at 04:35. The patrol spotted Dinaric still afloat with the ship's survivors in the water. Chevrier ordered his flight back to base. At 06:00, two Fairey Battle training aircraft from Mont-Joli, jury-rigged with depth charges patrolled the area. Chevrier's aircraft disappeared during the return to base with witnesses spotting an aircraft suffer two explosions near Cap-Chat. Neither his plane nor his body were ever recovered.

In the afternoon of 6 July, six Hudson bombers, three each from No. 119 Squadron RCAF and No. 113 Squadron RCAF were sent to Mont-Joli to establish an anti-submarine patrol there until 11 July when the aircraft from 119 Squadron returned to their airfield at Sydney. The minesweeper Clayoquot was dispatched to take Dinaric under tow. This was unsuccessful and Clayoquot used depth charges and gunfire to sink the vessel. Furthermore, the sailing of convoy QS-16 was delayed by twenty-four hours, sailing from Bic Island on 8 July.

== Bibliography ==
- Greenfield, Nathan M. (2004). The Battle of the St. Lawrence: The Second World War in Canada. Toronto: HarperCollins Publishers Limited. ISBN 0-00-200664-2.
- Hadley, Michael L. (1985). U-Boats Against Canada: German Submarines in Canadian Waters. Montreal, Quebec and Kingston, Ontario: McGill-Queen's University Press. ISBN 0-7735-0811-2.
- Milner, Marc (2010). Canada's Navy: The First Century (Second ed.). Toronto: University of Toronto Press. ISBN 978-0-8020-9604-3.
- Sarty, Roger (2012). War in the St. Lawrence: The Forgotten U-Boat Battles on Canada's Shores. Toronto: Penguin Group. ISBN 978-0-670-06787-9.
- Schull, Joseph (1961). The Far Distant Ships: An Official Account of Canadian Naval Operations in the Second World War. Ottawa: Queen's Printer. OCLC 19974782.
