= Convoys SG-6/LN-6 =

Convoy SG 6/LN 6
- Part of World War II, Battle of the Atlantic, Battle of the St. Lawrence
Date	27–28 August 1942
Location	Strait of Belle Isle

Belligerents
Germany	Canada; United States

Commanders and leaders
Karl Dönitz; Eberhard Hoffmann; Paul Hartwig	

Strength
2 U-boats	6 merchant ships 3 escorts/1 escort

Casualties and losses
	2 ships sunk 1 ship damaged

Convoy SG-6 was a supply convoy of merchant and troop ships during the Second World War. It was one of the numbered SG Convoys from Sydney, Nova Scotia to Greenland. The convoy was split into two groups, with Chatham being escorted by USCG Mojave in a formation coded SG-6F, while the remainder were with SG-6S. SG-6F was found and attacked on 27 September 1942 by U-517, sinking Chatham, while U-165 contacted SG-6S, sinking 1 ship and damaging another. Convoy LN-6, which was a supply convoy from Quebec City to Goose Bay, was nearby and its escort HMCS Trail broke off to conduct rescue operations.

== Ships in the convoy SG-6 ==
Name	Flag	Tonnage (GRT)	Notes
Chatham (1926)	United States	5,649	Sunk by U-517
USCGC Mojave	United States Coast Guard		Escort SG-6F
Alcoa Guard (1918)	United States	4,905	
Arlyn (1919)	United States	3,304	Sunk by U-517
Biscaya (1939)	Norway	1,323	
Harjurand (1919)	United States	812	
USCGC Algonquin	United States Coast Guard		Escort SG-6S
USCGC Mohawk	United States Coast Guard		Escort SG-6S
USS Laramie	United States Navy		Damaged by U-165
HMCS Trail	Royal Canadian Navy		Escort LN-6

== Bibliography ==
- Hague, Arnold (2000). The Allied Convoy System 1939–1945. ISBN 1-86176-147-3.

== See also ==
- No. 10 Squadron RCAF
