= Western Local Escort Force =

World War II-era escort group in the Royal Canadian Navy

Western Local Escort Force (WLEF) referred to the organization of anti-submarine escorts for World War II trade convoys from North American port cities to the Western Ocean Meeting Point (WOMP or WESTOMP) near Newfoundland where ships of the Mid-Ocean Escort Force (MOEF) assumed responsibility for safely delivering the convoys to the British Isles.

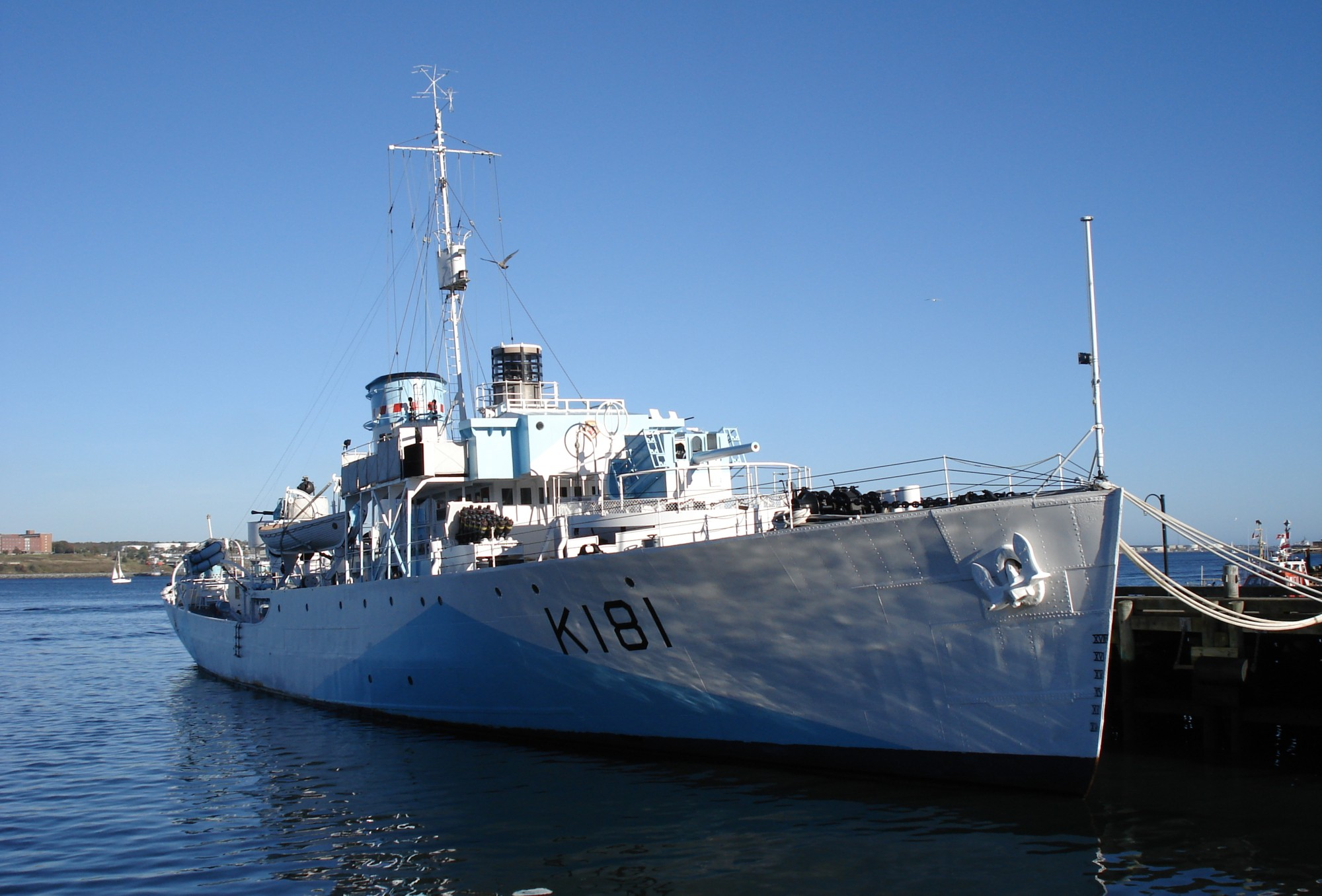
HMCS Sackville, preserved at Halifax Harbour, is the only survivor of the Flower-class corvettes providing the backbone of the WLEF.

== Background ==
On the basis of experience during World War I, the Admiralty instituted trade convoys in United Kingdom coastal waters from September 1939. Convoys gradually extended westward until HX 129 left Halifax, Nova Scotia on 27 May 1941 as the first convoy to receive escort for the entire trip from Canada. The American Neutrality Zone offered some protection in North American coastal waters until United States declaration of war in December 1941.

== Organization ==
The Royal Canadian Navy organized the Halifax-based Western Local Escort Force in February 1942 as German U-boats began patrolling North American coastal waters during the "second happy time". The Royal Navy provided the WLEF with twelve old, short-range destroyers well-equipped for anti-submarine warfare and manned by experienced personnel. Newly commissioned Canadian Flower-class corvettes and Bangor-class minesweepers were assigned to the WLEF. Town-class destroyers St. Clair, Columbia, and Niagara were assigned to the WLEF after their endurance proved inadequate for MOEF assignments. During the winter of 1942–43, some of these destroyers were organized into Western Support Force (WSF) groupings of three ships to augment protection of convoys coming under attack in the western Atlantic.

== Operations ==
The WLEF was theoretically organized into eight escort groups able to provide an escort of four to six ships to each convoy. WLEF escort group assignments were more dynamic than the MOEF escort groups, and WLEF escorts seldom worked with the same team of ships through successive convoys. A WLEF escort group would typically meet a westbound ON convoy at WOMP and then individual WLEF ships would be detached with elements of the convoy proceeding separately to Halifax, Sydney, Nova Scotia, Quebec ports on the St. Lawrence River, Saint John, New Brunswick, Boston, Massachusetts, or New York City. Some WLEF escorts were assigned to coastal convoys reaching as far south as the Caribbean Sea. Eastbound HX convoys and SC convoys worked in reverse forming with a few WLEF escorts in New York City and picking up others as ships joined from New England ports or the Maritimes. Short range escorts or escorts experiencing mechanical problems might be similarly detached and replaced at intermediate points between WOMP and New York City. The most frequent location for escort exchanges was the Halifax Ocean Meeting Point (HOMP) off the WLEF home port of Halifax.

The WLEF operated exclusively within range of anti-submarine patrol bombers; although weather often limited flight operations. U-boats were deployed cautiously in areas where air patrols were expected, so single U-boat encounters were more common than wolf pack engagements. The name was shortened to "Western Escort Force" (WEF) in the summer of 1943.

== Major combat event chronology ==
- 12 May 1942 – U-553 sank two ships in the St. Lawrence River.
- 6 July 1942 – U-132 sank three ships from convoy QS 15 escorted by Canadian Bangor-class minesweepers HMS Bangor and HMCS Drummondville.
- 20 July 1942 – U-132 sank one ship from convoy QS 19 escorted by Flower-class corvette HMCS Weyburn, Bangor-class minesweeper HMCS Chedabucto and anti-submarine motor launches Q059, Q064 and Q074.
- 29 July 1942 – U-132 sank one ship from convoy ON 113 escorted by WLEF.
- 27 August 1942 – Flower-class corvette HMCS Oakville sank U-94 while U-511 sank two ships from convoy TAW 15.
- 3 September 1942 – U-517 sank one ship from convoy NL 6 escorted by Flower-class corvette HMCS Weyburn and Bangor-class minesweeper HMCS Clayoquot.
- 6–7 September 1942 – U-165 sank one ship and the armed yacht HMCS Raccoon and U-517 sank three ships from convoy QS 33 escorted by Flower-class corvette HMCS Arrowhead, Bangor-class minesweepers HMCS Truro and HMCS Vegreville, and motor launches Q065 and Q083.
- 11 September 1942 – U-517 sank the Flower-class corvette HMCS Charlottetown that had been traveling with the Bangor-class minesweeper HMCS Clayoquot.
- 15–16 September 1942 – U-517 sank two ships and U-165 sank two ships from convoy SQ 36 escorted by Town-class destroyer HMCS Salisbury, Flower-class corvette HMCS Arrowhead, Bangor-class minesweeper HMCS Vegreville, and three motor launches.
- 21 September 1942 – Bangor-class minesweeper HMCS Georgian defended convoy SQ 38 from U-517.
- 13 October 1942 – U-69 sank the ferry SS Caribou from convoy NL 9 escorted by Flower-class corvettes HMCS Trail, HMCS Arrowhead and HMCS Shawinigan.
- 7–8 September 1944 – Flower-class corvette HMCS Norsyd attacked U-541 in the Gulf of St. Lawrence.
- 14 October 1944 – U-1223 torpedoed River-class frigate HMCS Magog escorting convoy ONS 33G in the Gulf of St. Lawrence.
- 23 October 1944 – Three torpedoes from U-1221 missed troopship Lady Rodney off Halifax.
- 2 November 1944 – U-1223 torpedoed freighter SS Fort Thompson in the Gulf of St. Lawrence.
- 14 January 1945 – U-1232 torpedoed Liberty ship SS Martin van Buren and tankers Athelviking and British Freedom off Halifax Harbour.

== Convoy routes ==
- AH – Aruba to Halifax Harbour a brief tanker series from July to September 1942
- BS – Corner Brook, Newfoundland to Sydney, Nova Scotia
- BW – Sydney, Nova Scotia to St. John's, Newfoundland
- BX – Boston to Halifax Harbour
- CL – St. John's, Newfoundland to Sydney, Nova Scotia
- FH – Saint John, New Brunswick to Halifax Harbour
- HA – Halifax Harbour to Curaçao (1942)
- HF – Halifax Harbour to Saint John, New Brunswick
- HHX – Halifax Harbour to meet HX convoys originating in New York City at the Halifax Ocean Meeting Point (HOMP)
- HJ – Halifax Harbour to St. John's, Newfoundland
- HON – Halifax Harbour to ON convoys at the Halifax Ocean Meeting Point (HOMP)
- HS – Halifax Harbour to Sydney, Nova Scotia
- HT – Halifax Harbour to Trinidad (replaced by HA convoys)
- JH – St. John's, Newfoundland to Halifax Harbour
- JN – St. John's, Newfoundland to Labrador
- LC – Sydney, Nova Scotia to St. John's, Newfoundland
- LN – St. Lawrence River to Labrador
- NJ – Newfoundland coast to St. John's, Newfoundland
- NL – Labrador to St. Lawrence River
- QS – Quebec to Sydney, Nova Scotia
- SB – Sydney, Nova Scotia to Corner Brook, Newfoundland
- SH – Sydney, Nova Scotia to Halifax Harbour
- SHX – Sydney, Nova Scotia to HX convoys
- SQ – Sydney, Nova Scotia to Quebec
- TH – Trinidad to Halifax Harbour
- WS – Wabana, Newfoundland to Sydney, Nova Scotia
- XB – Halifax Harbour to Boston

== See also ==
- Battle of the St. Lawrence
