= HMCS Drummondville =

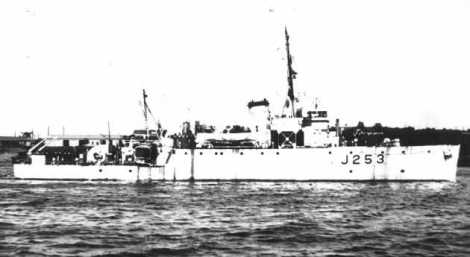
- HMCS Drummondville

History

Canada
- Name: Drummondville
- Namesake: Drummondville, Quebec
- Builder: Canadian Vickers Ltd., Montreal
- Laid down: 1 October 1941
- Launched: 21 May 1941
- Commissioned: 30 October 1941
- Decommissioned: 29 October 1945
- Identification: Pennant number: J253
- Honours and awards: Atlantic 1942–45, Gulf of St. Lawrence 1942
- Fate: Sold for mercantile use. Sank 1963.

General characteristics
- Class & type: Bangor-class minesweeper
- Displacement: 672 long tons (683 t)
- Length: 180 ft (54.9 m) oa
- Beam: 28 ft 6 in (8.7 m)
- Draught: 9 ft 9 in (3.0 m)
- Propulsion: 2 Admiralty 3-drum water tube boilers, 2 shafts, vertical triple-expansion reciprocating engines, 2,400 ihp (1,790 kW)
- Speed: 16.5 knots (31 km/h)
- Complement: 83
- Armament: 1 × 12-pounder (3 in (76 mm)) 12 cwt HA gun or QF 3-inch (76 mm) 20 cwt gun; 1 x QF 2 pdr Mark VIII; 2 × QF 20 mm Oerlikon guns; 40 depth charges as escort

HMCS Drummondville was a Bangor-class minesweeper that served with the Royal Canadian Navy during the Second World War. She saw action primarily in the Battle of the Atlantic. Entering service in 1941, she was sold for mercantile service after the war. In 1963, as Fort Albany, the ship was involved in a collision near Sorel, Quebec and sank. The ship was later raised and broken up.

== Design and description ==
A British design, the Bangor-class minesweepers were smaller than the preceding Halcyon-class minesweepers in British service, but larger than the Fundy class in Canadian service. They came in two versions powered by different engines; those with a diesel engines and those with vertical triple-expansion steam engines. Drummondville was of the latter design and was larger than her diesel-engined cousins. Drummondville was 180 feet (54.9 m) long overall, had a beam of 28 feet 6 inches (8.7 m) and a draught of 9 feet 9 inches (3.0 m). The minesweeper had a displacement of 672 long tons (683 t). She had a complement of 6 officers and 77 enlisted.

Drummondville had two vertical triple-expansion steam engines, each driving one shaft, using steam provided by two Admiralty three-drum boilers. The engines produced a total of 2,400 indicated horsepower (1,800 kW) and gave a maximum speed of 16.5 knots (30.6 km/h; 19.0 mph). The minesweeper could carry a maximum of 150 long tons (152 t) of fuel oil.

In general, Bangor-class minesweepers were armed with either a single quick-firing (QF) 12-pounder (3 in (76 mm)) 12 cwt HA gun or a QF 3-inch (76 mm) 20 cwt gun mounted forward. (Note: "Cwt" is the abbreviation for hundredweight, 20 cwt referring to the weight of the gun.) The ships were also fitted with a QF 2-pounder Mark VIII aft and were eventually fitted with single-mounted QF 20 mm Oerlikon guns on the bridge wings. Those ships assigned to convoy duty were armed with two depth charge launchers and four chutes to deploy their 40 depth charges. Drummondville was equipped with LL and SA minesweeping gear to counter magnetic and acoustic naval mines.

== Service history ==
Drummondville was ordered as part of the 1940–41 building programme. The minesweeper's keel was laid on 10 January 1941 by Canadian Vickers Ltd at Montreal, Quebec. The ship was launched on 21 May 1941 and commissioned on 30 October 1941 at Montreal with the pennant number J253.

The minesweeper arrived at Halifax, Nova Scotia on 11 November and served for the first three years of her career with the Western Local Escort Force, the Gulf Escort Force and the Halifax Local Defence Force. Her duties included escort of convoys through the Gulf of St. Lawrence. On 6 July 1942, while escorting the convoy QS-15 composed of twelve merchant ships with HMS Bangor from Quebec City to Sydney, Nova Scotia, the convoy was attacked by the German U-boat U-132. The submarine managed to sink three merchant ships in an hour and a half. Drummondville managed to severely damage the U-boat in turn and drive the submarine off. In January 1943 the Western Local Escort Force escorts were organized into groups. Drummondville was placed in 24.18.8 alongside sister ship Kenora and corvettes Quesnel and Saskatoon. She joined Newfoundland Force in February 1944. She was refitted at Louisburg, Nova Scotia before being sent to Bermuda in August for her working up. She continued working with Newfoundland Force until June 1945. From then until October 1945 she was occupied with general coastal duties. She was paid off on 29 October 1945 and placed in strategic reserve at Sorel, Quebec.

=== Post war service ===
After the war she remained in strategic reserve until 1952 when her status was upgraded to reserve and sent to Sydney. The vessel was given the new pennant number 181. However, she was never recommissioned and was sold in September 1958 to Beauchemin Nav Ltd and registered in Halifax. The minesweeper was converted in 1960 to the merchant ship SS Fort Albany of 617 GRT and served as such until she was sunk in a collision near Sorel. On 8 December 1963, while carrying a load of calcium and steel bars, Fort Albany collided with the Norwegian freighter Procyon in thick fog and sank in the St. Lawrence River near Sorel. Four out of the ten crew died as the ship sank quickly. The hull was raised and broken up at Sorel in 1964.
