= HMCS Saskatoon (K158) =

Flower-class corvette

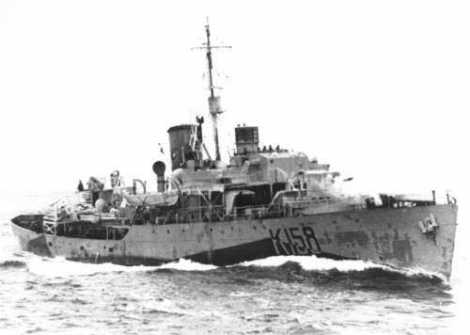
- HMCS Saskatoon

History

Canada
- Name: Saskatoon
- Namesake: Saskatoon, Saskatchewan
- Ordered: 20 January 1940
- Builder: Canadian Vickers Ltd., Montreal
- Laid down: 9 August 1940
- Launched: 7 November 1940
- Commissioned: 9 June 1941
- Decommissioned: 25 June 1945
- Identification: Pennant number: K158
- Honours and awards: Atlantic 1942–45
- Fate: Sold for mercantile use 1948. Sunk 1953

General characteristics
- Class & type: Flower-class corvette (original)
- Displacement: 925 long tons (940 t; 1,036 short tons)
- Length: 205 ft (62.48 m)o/a
- Beam: 33 ft (10.06 m)
- Draught: 11.5 ft (3.51 m)
- Propulsion: Single shaft; 2 × fire tube Scotch boilers; 1 × 4-cycle triple-expansion reciprocating steam engine; 2,750 ihp (2,050 kW)
- Speed: 16 knots (29.6 km/h)
- Range: 3,500 nautical miles (6,482 km) at 12 knots (22.2 km/h)
- Complement: 85
- Sensors & processing systems: 1 × SW1C or 2C radar; 1 × Type 123A or Type 127DV sonar
- Armament: 1 × BL 4 in (102 mm) Mk.IX single gun; 2 × .50 cal machine gun (twin); 2 × Lewis .303 cal machine gun (twin); 2 × Mk.II depth charge throwers; 2 × depth charge rails with 40 depth charges; Originally fitted with minesweeping gear, later removed

HMCS Saskatoon was a Flower-class corvette that served with the Royal Canadian Navy during the Second World War. She saw service primarily in the Battle of the Atlantic. She is named for Saskatoon, Saskatchewan.

== Background ==
Flower-class corvettes like Saskatoon serving with the Royal Canadian Navy during the Second World War were different from earlier and more traditional sail-driven corvettes. The "corvette" designation was created by the French for classes of small warships; the Royal Navy borrowed the term for a period but discontinued its use in 1877. During the hurried preparations for war in the late 1930s, Winston Churchill reactivated the corvette class, needing a name for smaller ships used in an escort capacity, in this case based on a whaling ship design. The generic name "flower" was used to designate the class of these ships, which – in the Royal Navy – were named after flowering plants.

Corvettes commissioned by the Royal Canadian Navy during the Second World War were named after communities for the most part, to better represent the people who took part in building them. This idea was put forth by Admiral Percy W. Nelles. Sponsors were commonly associated with the community for which the ship was named. Royal Navy corvettes were designed as open sea escorts, while Canadian corvettes were developed for coastal auxiliary roles which was exemplified by their minesweeping gear. Eventually the Canadian corvettes would be modified to allow them to perform better on the open seas.

== Construction ==
Saskatoon was ordered on 20 January 1940 as part of the 1939–1940 Flower-class building program. She was laid down on 9 August 1940 by Canadian Vickers Ltd. at Montreal and launched on 7 November later that year. She was commissioned on 9 June 1941 at Montreal.

During her career, Saskatoon had two major refits. Her first took place at Halifax from 11 August until 17 November 1942. The second overhaul took place at Pictou, Nova Scotia from mid-December 1943 until 1 April 1944. During this second refit, Saskatoon had her fo'c'sle extended.

== War service ==
After arriving at Halifax for deployment, she joined Halifax Force initially. During August–September 1941, she was sent on a mission to the Bahamas, returning to local escort duty upon her return.

She joined the Western Local Escort Force (WLEF) in March 1942. She stayed with WLEF for the rest of the war. During her time with WLEF she was mainly placed on "Triangle Run" convoys; convoys that traveled between Boston, New York and Halifax. Beginning in June 1943, she was assigned to WLEF escort group W-8. In April 1944 she transferred to group W-6.

== Post war service ==
Saskatoon was paid off at Sorel, Quebec on 25 June 1945. She was sold for conversion as a whale-catcher. She reappeared in 1948 as Tra los Mortes. In 1950 she was renamed Olympic Fighter and in 1956, Otori Maru No.6. In 1961 she was renamed Kyo Maru No. 20 and last appeared on Lloyd's Register in 1978–79. Miramar Ship Index (MSI) has an entirely different post-naval career. The ship was sold for mercantile conversion and entered service as Rio Norte in 1946. The ship was renamed Mabruk in 1947 and Misr in 1948. On 16 May 1953 the vessel collided with Jaguar 3 nautical miles (5.6 km; 3.5 mi) south of Newport Rock in Suez Bay.
