= HMCS Chedabucto =

1941 Bangor-class minesweeper

Coordinates: 48°14′N 69°16′W

History

Canada
- Name: Chedabucto
- Namesake: Chedabucto Bay, Nova Scotia
- Ordered: 23 February 1940
- Builder: Burrard Dry Dock Co. Ltd., North Vancouver
- Laid down: 24 January 1941
- Launched: 14 April 1941
- Commissioned: 27 September 1941
- Out of service: 21 October 1943
- Identification: Pennant number: J168
- Honours and awards: Atlantic 1942–43, Gulf of St. Lawrence 1942
- Fate: Sunk in collision 1943

General characteristics
- Class & type: Bangor-class minesweeper
- Displacement: 672 long tons (683 t)
- Length: 180 ft (54.9 m) oa
- Beam: 28 ft 6 in (8.7 m)
- Draught: 9 ft 9 in (3.0 m)
- Propulsion: 2 Admiralty 3-drum water tube boilers, 2 shafts, vertical triple-expansion reciprocating engines, 2,400 ihp (1,790 kW)
- Speed: 16.5 knots (31 km/h)
- Complement: 83
- Armament: 1 × QF 4 in (102 mm)/40 cal Mk IV gun; 1 × QF 2-pounder Mark VIII; 2 × QF 20 mm Oerlikon guns; 40 depth charges as escort

HMCS Chedabucto was a Bangor-class minesweeper that served with the Royal Canadian Navy during the Second World War. She served primarily in the Battle of the Atlantic. During the Battle of the St. Lawrence in 1943, Chedabucto was sunk in a collision with a cable ship.

== Design and description ==
A British design, the Bangor-class minesweepers were smaller than the preceding Halcyon-class minesweepers in British service, but larger than the Fundy class in Canadian service. They came in two versions powered by different engines; those with a diesel engines and those with vertical triple-expansion steam engines. Chedabucto was of the latter design and was larger than her diesel-engined cousins. Chedabucto was 180 feet (54.9 m) long overall, had a beam of 28 feet 6 inches (8.7 m) and a draught of 9 feet 9 inches (3.0 m). The minesweeper had a displacement of 672 long tons (683 t). She had a complement of 6 officers and 77 enlisted.

Chedabucto had two vertical triple-expansion steam engines, each driving one shaft, using steam provided by two Admiralty three-drum boilers. The engines produced a total of 2,400 indicated horsepower (1,800 kW) and gave a maximum speed of 16.5 knots (30.6 km/h; 19.0 mph). The minesweeper could carry a maximum of 150 long tons (152 t) of fuel oil.

Chedabucto was armed with a single quick-firing (QF) 4-inch (102 mm)/40 caliber Mk IV gun mounted forward. (Note: The 40 calibre denotes the length of the gun. This means that the length of the gun barrel is 40 times the bore diameter.) For anti-aircraft purposes, the minesweeper was equipped with one QF 2-pounder Mark VIII and two single-mounted QF 20 mm Oerlikon guns. As a convoy escort, Chedabucto was deployed with 40 depth charges launched from two depth charge throwers and four chutes.

== Construction and career ==
Chedabucto was ordered on 23 February 1940 and her keel was laid down on 24 January 1941 by Burrard Dry Dock Co. Ltd. in Vancouver, British Columbia. The minesweeper was launched on 14 April 1941 and commissioned later that year on 27 September at Vancouver. The vessel was named for Chedabucto Bay, Nova Scotia.

After working up Chedabucto left Esquimalt, British Columbia on 11 November 1941 and arrived at Halifax, Nova Scotia on 17 December. On 12 January 1942, Chedabucto rescued the crew of the merchant Independence Hall which had run aground on Sable Island. On 8 April, Chedabucto attacked a surfaced U-boat off Halifax. However, the ship's steering gear jammed and the U-boat was able to evade the minesweeper. On 10 April SS Trongate caught fire in Halifax harbour. Among the contents of her cargo were explosives. Chedabucto sank Trongate with non-explosive practice shells fired into the hull to scuttle the ship.

Assigned to the Western Local Escort Force (WLEF) briefly, she was transferred to the Gulf Escort Force in June 1942. On 20 July 1942, convoy QS 19, escorted by Chedabucto and the corvette Weyburn, came under attack by U-132 in the Gulf of St. Lawrence. One merchant vessel was sunk. At the end of September convoy QS 38, which the minesweeper was escorting, came under attack by U-517. One merchant was hit but no contact was made between the escorts and the submarine. In September she was re-assigned to Sydney Force before returning to the WLEF in January 1943. Chedabucto then went for a refit at Lunenburg, Nova Scotia which were completed in June 1943. She was then assigned to the Gaspé Force in July. In October, Chedabucto was detailed to escort the cable ship SS Lord Kelvin through the Gulf of St. Lawrence. The minesweeper screened the cable layer until Father Point and then detached to patrol duties.

=== Sinking ===
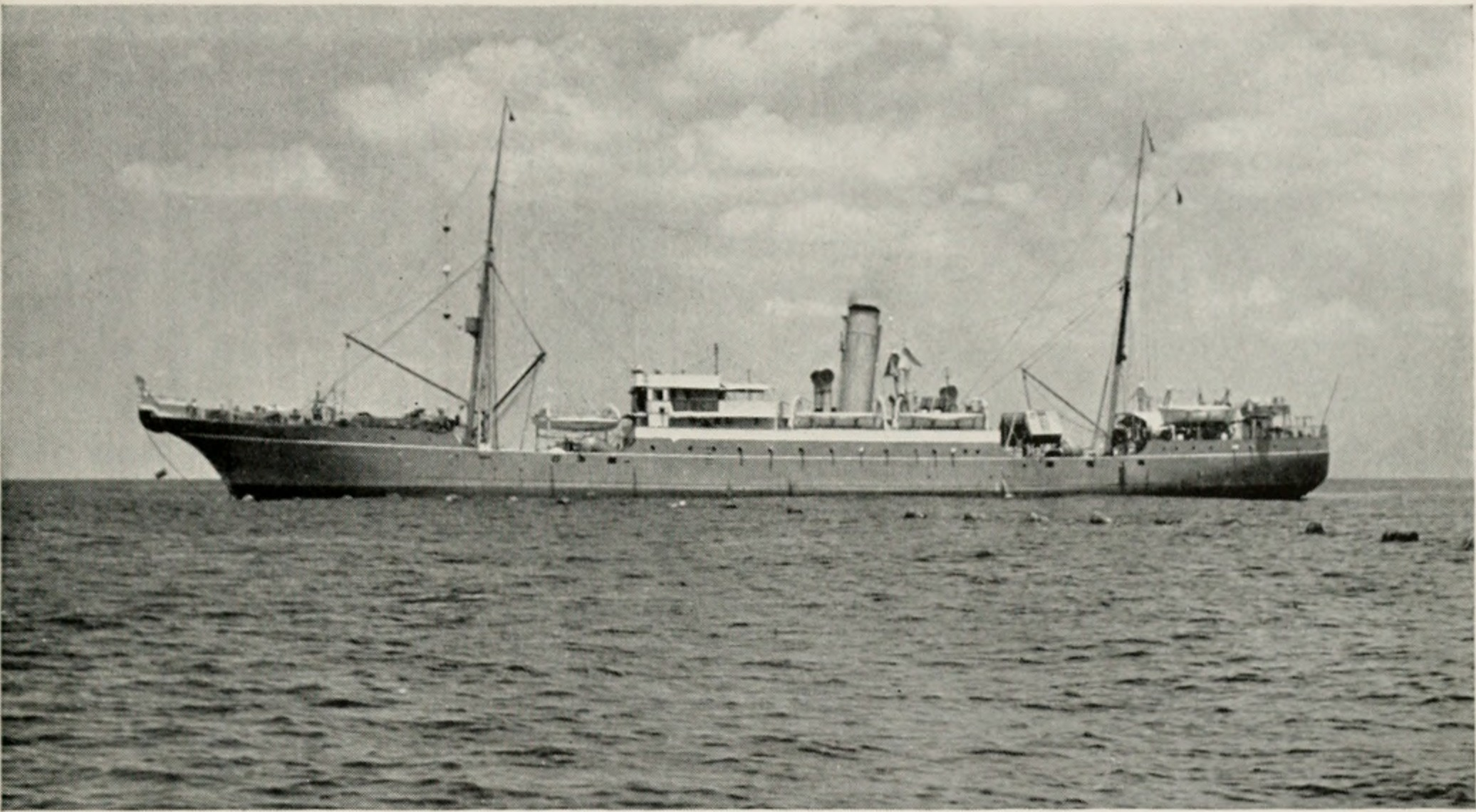
Lord Kelvin, the vessel that rammed Chedabucto

On 21 October 1943, Chedabucto was sailing down the Saint Lawrence River to rendezvous with the fire tugboat Citadelle when the minesweeper collided with the cable ship Lord Kelvin near Rimouski, Quebec. Lord Kelvin rammed the minesweeper on the port side, just aft of the wardroom. Lord Kelvin reversed, leaving a 25-by-12-foot (7.6 by 3.7 m) hole in the side of the ship and a 10° list to port. The United States Coast Guard vessel Buttonwood was hailed and attempted to tow the stricken minesweeper closer to shore. However, the minesweeper grounded 2.4 km (1 1/2 mi) from shore and the list increased to 40°. The tow attempts were ceased and the crew of Chedabucto was transferred to Lord Kelvin and Chedabucto's sister ship Swift Current which had also arrived on the scene. The minesweeper later rolled onto her side and sank. There was one casualty aboard Chedabucto, suffered during the collision. The ship sank 48 kilometres (30 mi) from Rimouski.
