= USS Laramie (AO-16) =

Oiler of the United States Navy

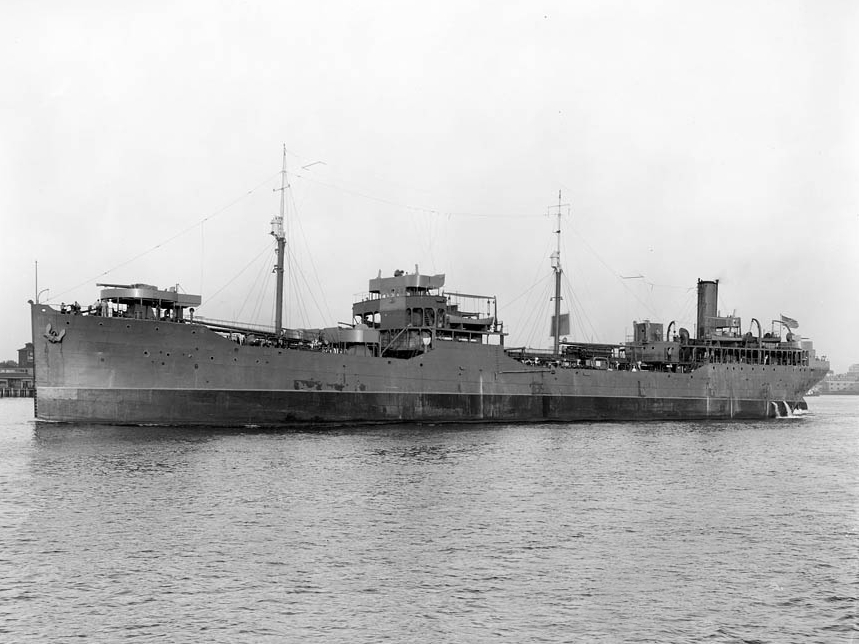

History

United States
- Name: USS Laramie
- Namesake: Laramie River in Colorado and Wyoming
- Builder: William Cramp & Sons Shipbuilding Co., Philadelphia
- Launched: 26 November 1919
- Completed: February 1920
- Acquired: 17 December 1921
- Commissioned: 28 December 1921; 6 December 1940
- Decommissioned: 19 June 1922; 16 November 1945
- Fate: Sold for scrapping by the Maritime Commission, 1 July 1947 to Boston Metals Co., Baltimore, MD.

General characteristics
- Displacement: 4,410
- Length: 446 ft (136 m)
- Beam: 58 ft (18 m)
- Draft: 25 ft 6 in (7.77 m)
- Speed: 11 kts
- Complement: 107
- Armament: two 5 in (130 mm) dual purpose, four twin 40 mm AA, four twin 20 mm AA

USS Laramie (AO-16) was a Kaweah-class fleet replenishment oiler in the United States Navy.

Laramie was built in 1920 under USSB contract by William Cramp & Sons, Philadelphia; acquired by the Navy at Mobile, Alabama, 17 December 1921; and commissioned 28 December 1921.

Steaming from Mobile 10 January 1922, Laramie reached Norfolk 13 January and decommissioned 19 June. She recommissioned in ordinary 26 June 1940 at Philadelphia. She arrived Brooklyn Navy Yard 28 June for alterations; recommissioned in full 6 December; returned to Philadelphia 15 December; and arrived Norfolk 17 January 1941 for duty with the Atlantic Fleet.

== South American operations ==
Between 18 January and 5 June Laramie made six runs to Baton Rouge, Louisiana, to transport fuel oil to Norfolk and Bermuda. She sailed from Norfolk to Bahia Bay, Brazil, via Guantanamo Bay 24 June to 21 July; operated along the Brazilian coast until 13 August; then returned to Norfolk 1 September for overhaul. Departing 11 October, she carried fuel oil via Boston and St. John's, Newfoundland, to Narsarsuaq, Greenland, site of a United States air base known as Bluie West One, where she arrived 25 October.

== World War II Atlantic Theatre operations ==
When the United States entered the war against the Axis powers, Laramie was operating along the southwestern coast of Greenland carrying oil and gasoline. She steamed from Narsarsuaq to Norfolk via Sydney, Nova Scotia, 11 to 23 December; and, after completing two fueling runs to Baton Rouge, she cleared Casco Bay, Maine, 8 March 1942 with a cargo of gasoline and oil for Army bases in Greenland. Throughout the remainder of 1942 and during 1943 she plied the stormy North Atlantic, transporting liquid and dry cargo to Greenland from Boston; New York; Sydney, Nova Scotia; and NS Argentia and St. John's, Newfoundland.

=== Torpedoed in the Belle Isle Strait ===
Loaded with 361,000 gallons of aviation gasoline, 55,000 barrels of oil, and with general cargo, including depth charges. Laramie departed Sydney for Greenland 26 August 1942 as part of convoy SG-6. On the evening of the 27th she was torpedoed while steaming in convoy at the eastern end of Belle Isle Strait during a part of the Battle of the Gulf of St. Lawrence. Hit on the port side forward by a torpedo fired by U-165 commanded by Eberhard Hoffman, she immediately listed to port and went down by the bow some 37 feet. The blast demolished the forward crew's quarters, killing four men; opened a hole 41 feet long and 34 feet high, causing extensive flooding forward; and ruptured the port gasoline tank, spraying the ship with volatile liquid and explosive fumes.

Despite flooding and imminent danger of explosion, the captain, Comdr. P. M. Moncy, took immediate and effective action to save Laramie. Although gasoline ran ankle-deep over the forward gun platforms, no fires broke out, and a steam-smothering system protected unruptured holds. Prompt pumping of liquid cargo corrected the list and reduced the forward draft.

=== Return to Sydney for repairs ===
Escorted by U.S. Coast Guard cutter Mohawk, Laramie returned to Sydney 30 August before steaming to Boston 2 to 5 September for damage repairs. Commander Moncy later received the Navy Cross for directing the saving of Laramie under extremely hazardous conditions.

After a run to Aruba, Netherlands West Indies, from 21 February to 2 March 1944 for a cargo of gasoline, Laramie resumed voyages to Greenland out of Boston 25 March. She returned to Aruba 28 August; carried fuel to Newfoundland via Guantanamo and Boston 7 to 27 September; then returned to the Caribbean 17 October to shuttle liquid cargo between Aruba and Guantanamo. Steaming to New York via Bermuda 9 to 20 November, she resumed shuttle runs along the eastern seaboard to Newfoundland and Greenland.

== After the war ==
On 8 August 1945 Laramie arrived in Boston from Grønnedal, Greenland. Steaming to Norfolk 4 to 6 September, she decommissioned 16 November 1945. She was transferred to the Maritime Commission 11 June 1946 and on 1 July 1947 was delivered to Boston Metals Co., Baltimore
