= HMCS Hepatica =

Flower-class corvette

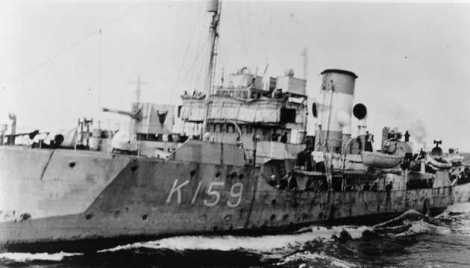
- HMCS Hepatica

History

United Kingdom
- Name: Hepatica
- Namesake: Hepatica
- Ordered: 22 January 1940
- Builder: Davie Shipbuilding and Repairing Co. Ltd., Lauzon
- Laid down: 24 February 1940
- Launched: 6 July 1940
- Commissioned: 12 November 1940
- Out of service: 15 May 1941 – loaned to Canada
- Identification: Pennant number: K159
- Fate: Loaned to Canada 1941; returned 1945; scrapped 1948

Canada
- Name: Hepatica
- Acquired: Loaned from Royal Navy
- Commissioned: 15 May 1941
- Out of service: 27 June 1945
- Identification: Pennant number: K159
- Motto: Caveant Hostes Sub Mare Hepaticus Vigilat (Beware Enemy Under The Sea Hepatica Watches)
- Honours and awards: Atlantic 1940–45; Gulf of St. Lawrence 1942, 1944
- Fate: Returned to the Royal Navy 27 June 1945.
- Badge: Bulldog Head within a V

General characteristics
- Class & type: Flower-class corvette (original)
- Displacement: 925 long tons (940 t; 1,036 short tons)
- Length: 205 ft (62.48 m)o/a
- Beam: 33 ft (10.06 m)
- Draught: 11.5 ft (3.51 m)
- Propulsion: Single shaft; 2 × fire tube Scotch boilers; 1 × 4-cycle triple-expansion reciprocating steam engine; 2,750 ihp (2,050 kW)
- Speed: 16 knots (29.6 km/h)
- Range: 3,500 nautical miles (6,482 km) at 12 knots (22.2 km/h)
- Complement: 85
- Sensors & processing systems: 1 × SW1C or 2C radar; 1 × Type 123A or Type 127DV sonar
- Armament: 1 × BL 4 in (102 mm) Mk.IX single gun; 2 × .50 cal machine gun (twin); 2 × Lewis .303 cal machine gun (twin); 2 × Mk.II depth charge throwers; 2 × Depth charge rails with 40 depth charges; Originally fitted with minesweeping gear, later removed

HMCS Hepatica was a Flower-class corvette that served primarily with the Royal Canadian Navy during the Second World War. She saw service in the Battle of the Atlantic as an ocean escort. Originally commissioned into the Royal Navy, she was loaned to Canada in 1941.

== Background ==
Flower-class corvettes like Hepatica serving with the Royal Canadian Navy during the Second World War were different from earlier and more traditional sail-driven corvettes. The "corvette" designation was created by the French as a class of small warships; the Royal Navy borrowed the term for a period but discontinued its use in 1877. During the hurried preparations for war in the late 1930s, Winston Churchill reactivated the corvette class, needing a name for smaller ships used in an escort capacity, in this case based on a whaling ship design. The generic name "flower" was used to designate the class of these ships, which – in the Royal Navy – were named after flowering plants.

== Construction ==
Hepatica was ordered on 22 January 1940 as part of the 1939–1940 Flower-class building program. She was laid on 24 February 1940 by Davie Shipbuilding and Repairing Co. Ltd. in Lauzon, Quebec and launched 6 July later that year. Hepatica was commissioned into the Royal Navy on 12 November 1940 at Quebec City. She sailed for Halifax and left harbour on 18 December with a convoy bound for the United Kingdom. She was completed in March 1941 at Greenock. On 15 May 1941 Heptaica was one of ten corvettes loaned to Canada. She could be told apart from other Canadian Flowers by her lack of minesweeping gear and the siting of the after gun tub amidships.

Hepatica had two extensive refits during her service. She underwent her first from February to April 1943 at New York. The second refit for Hepatica, which saw her fo'c'sle extended, took place beginning in March 1944 and taking until June to complete, also at New York.

== Wartime service ==
=== Royal Navy ===
After completing at Greenock and working up, Hepatica was assigned to Escort Group EG 4 in April 1941. She served with the unit until her transfer to Canada.

=== Royal Canadian Navy ===
Hepatica arrived in June 1941 on loan from the Royal Navy. She was assigned to the Newfoundland Escort Force where she worked with four escort groups over the next eleven months, her longest stint were with groups 23N, from July to September 1941 escorting convoys from St. John's to Iceland and N12, from December 1941 until February 1942, where starting in January, she began escorting convoys from St. John's to Derry.

In June 1942, Hepatica transferred to the Tanker Escort Force for one trip, after the U-boat menace was extended to the North American coastline. In late July, she was reassigned to the Gulf Escort Force, escorting convoys between Quebec and Sydney. Later, in October, she was sent to escort the convoys between Quebec and Labrador.

Hepatica joined the Western Local Escort Force (WLEF) in December 1942 and would remain with this force for the better part of the war. In June 1943, she was assigned to escort group W-5 and then in April 1944, W-4. She remained with this escort group for the remainder of her service time with WLEF. In May 1945 she escorted HX 358 back to the United Kingdom, and was assigned to Western Approaches Command for the remainder of the war.

== Post war service ==
She was returned to the Royal Navy on 27 June 1945 at Milford Haven. Sold on 1 January 1948, Hepatica was broken up at Llanelly, Wales.
