= HMCS Trail =

Flower-class corvette

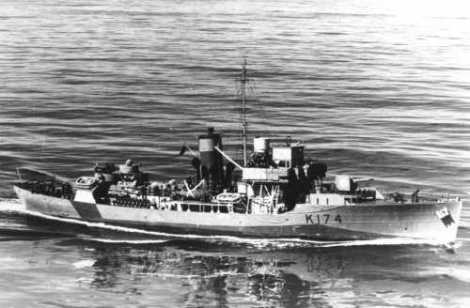
- HMCS Trail

History

Canada
- Name: Trail
- Namesake: Trail, British Columbia
- Ordered: 14 February 1940
- Builder: Burrard Dry Dock Co. Ltd., North Vancouver
- Laid down: 20 July 1940
- Launched: 16 October 1940
- Commissioned: 30 April 1941
- Out of service: paid off 17 July 1945
- Identification: Pennant number: K174
- Honours and awards: Atlantic 1941–45, Gulf of St. Lawrence 1942
- Fate: Sold for scrapping August 1950.

General characteristics
- Class & type: Flower-class corvette (original)
- Displacement: 950 long tons (970 t; 1,060 short tons)
- Length: 205 ft (62.48 m)
- Beam: 33 ft (10.06 m)
- Draught: 11.5 ft (3.51 m)
- Propulsion: Single shaft; 2 water tube boilers; 1 4-cyl. triple expansion steam engine, 2,750 hp (2,050 kW)
- Speed: 16 knots (29.6 km/h)
- Range: 3,450 nmi (6,390 km; 3,970 mi) at 12 kn (22 km/h; 14 mph)
- Complement: 6 officers, 79 enlisted
- Sensors & processing systems: Radar – SW1C or 2C (later); Sonar – Type 123A, later Type 127DV
- Armament: 1 × BL 4 in (102 mm) Mk.IX single gun; 2 .50 cal machine gun twin; 2 Lewis .303 cal mg twin; 2 Mk.II depth charge throwers; 2 depth charge rails with 40 depth charges.; Originally fitted with minesweeping gear, later removed.

HMCS Trail was a Flower-class corvette that served with the Royal Canadian Navy during the Second World War. She served primarily in the Battle of the Atlantic as a convoy escort. She was named for Trail, British Columbia.

== Background ==
Flower-class corvettes like Trail serving with the Royal Canadian Navy during the Second World War were different from earlier and more traditional sail-driven corvettes. The "corvette" designation was created by the French for classes of small warships; the Royal Navy borrowed the term for a period but discontinued its use in 1877. During the hurried preparations for war in the late 1930s, Winston Churchill reactivated the corvette class, needing a name for smaller ships used in an escort capacity, in this case based on a whaling ship design. The generic name "flower" was used to designate the class of these ships, which – in the Royal Navy – were named after flowering plants.

Corvettes commissioned by the Royal Canadian Navy during the Second World War were named after communities, for the most part, to better represent the people who took part in building them. This idea was put forth by Admiral Percy W. Nelles. Sponsors were commonly associated with the community for which the ship was named. Royal Navy corvettes were designed as open sea escorts, while Canadian corvettes were developed for coastal auxiliary roles which were exemplified by their minesweeping gear. Eventually, the Canadian corvettes would be modified to allow them to perform better on the open seas.

== Construction ==
Trail was ordered 14 February 1940 as part of the 1939–1940 Flower-class building program. She was laid down by Burrard Dry Dock Co. Ltd. at Vancouver, British Columbia and launched 16 October 1940. She was commissioned into the Royal Canadian Navy at Vancouver 30 April 1941.

During her career, Trail had three major refits. The first took place at Liverpool, Nova Scotia beginning in April 1942 and lasted until June. The second overhaul was done at Lunenburg from mid-July 1943 until September of that year. Her final significant refit took place from mid-July 1944 until 23 October 1944 at Liverpool. During this refit, Trail had her fo'c'sle extended.

== Service history ==
After commissioning, Trail was reassigned to the east coast of Canada and left Esquimalt 31 May 1941. She arrived in Halifax 27 June after transiting through the Panama Canal. In August 1941 she was assigned to Newfoundland Command where she escorted convoys between St. John's and Iceland. During her service with this unit, she was part of escort groups 17N, N11, N13, and N12. She remained with Newfoundland Command until April 1942 when she departed for a refit.

After returning to service, Trail joined Halifax Force in June 1942 escorting convoys between Labrador and Quebec City. During her time with Halifax Force, in late August she picked up survivors from the American passenger ship Chatham that had been torpedoed and sunk by U-517 in the Belle Isle Strait. Six days later on 3 September 1942, Trail helped HMCS Shawinigan rescue 17 survivors from the Canadian merchant ship Donald Stewart, which had also been sunk by the U-517. In November 1942 she was reassigned to the Western Local Escort Force (WLEF). She was assigned to escort group W-6 in June 1943. In April 1944 she was assigned to group W-5 just before departing for her last major refit. In December 1944, after working up, Trail joined escort group W-4, which she remained with for the rest of the war.

Following the cessation of hostilities, Trail returned to Canada and was paid off at Sorel, Quebec 17 July 1945. She was sold for scrap in August 1950 and broken up at Hamilton, Ontario.
