= HMCS Raccoon =

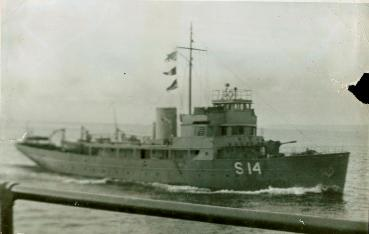
- HMCS Raccoon

History
- Name: Halonia
- Builder: Bath Iron Works, Bath, Maine
- Yard number: 146
- Launched: 2 May 1931
- Completed: 1931
- Fate: Acquired by Royal Canadian Navy 1940

Canada
- Name: Raccoon
- Namesake: raccoon
- Acquired: March 1940
- Commissioned: 17 May 1940
- Home port: Gaspé, Quebec
- Identification: Pennant number S14
- Honours and awards: Gulf of St. Lawrence 1942
- Fate: Sunk 7 September 1942

General characteristics
- Type: Armed yacht
- Displacement: 377 long tons (383 t)
- Length: 148 ft (45.1 m)
- Beam: 25 ft (7.6 m)
- Draught: 10 ft (3.0 m)
- Speed: 11 knots (20 km/h; 13 mph)
- Complement: 40
- Armament: 1 × QF 12-pounder 12 cwt naval gun

HMCS Raccoon was an armed yacht that served in the Royal Canadian Navy during World War II. Purchased by the Royal Canadian Navy in 1940, the ship was originally known as the yacht Halonia. Used as a patrol vessel and convoy escort, the ship was sunk by the German submarine U-165 in the St. Lawrence River on 7 September 1942. Raccoon was escorting Convoy QS-33 at the time. The entire ship's crew was lost.

== Description ==
As built, Halonia had a gross register tonnage (GRT) of 361. As an armed yacht, Raccoon displaced 377 long tons (383 t). The ship had a length of 148 feet (45.1 m), a beam of 25 feet (7.6 m) and a draught of 10 feet (3.0 m). The ship was capable of 11 knots (20 km/h; 13 mph) and had a complement of 40. During her conversion to an armed yacht, a single QF 12-pounder 12 cwt naval gun was mounted forward, an ASDIC was installed and the vessel was armed with depth charges. (Note: "Cwt" is the abbreviation for hundredweight, 12 cwt referring to the weight of the gun.)

== Construction and career ==
The yacht was built in 1931 by Bath Iron Works at their yard in Bath, Maine for Charles A. Thorne of Chicago, Illinois. Constructed with the yard number 146, the ship was launched on 2 May 1931 as Halonia. The ship was registered in the United States.

After failing to acquire any British vessels at beginning of World War II for auxiliary purposes, the Royal Canadian Navy discreetly searched the American market for suitable ships. However, American law prevented the sale of ships for possible use in the war to any of the belligerents. The Royal Canadian Navy requisitioned unsuitable Canadian yachts and had their respective owners go the United States and buy those ships the Navy wanted as replacements. Once the ships arrived in Canada, the navy then returned the original yachts and requisitioned the new ones. Halonia was purchased by Montye McRae of Toronto, Ontario from Ray van Clief of New York City for $207,100 and transferred to the Royal Canadian Navy in March 1940. Renamed Raccoon, the vessel was commissioned on 17 May 1940 and sent out on patrol, unarmed off Halifax, Nova Scotia, to give the appearance of a naval presence to the merchant vessels. On 18 October, Raccoon sailed to Pictou, Nova Scotia for conversion to an armed yacht.

Following her conversion, Raccoon was assigned to the Halifax Local Defence Force based out of Halifax in December 1940. In July 1941 the ship transferred to HMCS Fort Ramsay near Gaspé, Quebec to patrol and escort convoys in the St. Lawrence River and Gulf of St. Lawrence, returning to Halifax and the Halifax Local Defence Force when the river froze over. Raccoon was one of the original ships assigned to Gaspé Force. On 25 May 1942, the armed yacht returned to the Gulf Escort Force based out of Gaspé as a convoy escort. The Gulf Escort Force were responsible for convoys from Quebec City, Quebec to Sydney, Nova Scotia and back, designated QS and SQ convoys. The first of these convoys sailed from Sydney as convoy SQ 3 with Raccoon and the Bangor-class minesweeper HMCS Drummondville. In July, Raccoon was ordered to aid convoy QS 15, which had come under attack by a U-boat. The armed yacht was directed to round up the dispersed convoy.

=== Sinking ===
On 2 September, Raccoon was escorting a convoy when the armed yacht came under U-boat attack. At least two torpedoes were fired at Raccoon with one passing ahead of and one passing beneath the ship, forward of the bridge. However, the depth of the torpedoes had been set too deep, meant for a larger merchant vessel. Raccoon followed the tracks to the suspected site of the German submarine and dropped depth charges, but found no trace of the attacker.

Raccoon was escorting the convoy QS-33 on the evening of 6 September when the merchant ship Aeas was attacked and sunk by U-165 off Cap-Chat, Quebec. As the corvette HMCS Arrowhead, the lead ship of the escort, slowed to pick up survivors of the merchant vessel, Raccoon went to screen the convoy. At 12:12 AM, two loud explosions were heard astern of the convoy. The Fairmile motor launch Q 065 saw two spouts of white water in the distance but assumed that it was Raccoon dropping depth charges. Arrowhead swept back to the rear of the convoy and did not spot Raccoon in position, but did nothing about it until 7:27 AM, when the corvette requested Raccoon's position and received no response. The convoy continued on, coming under attack again on 7 September with a further three merchant vessels torpedoed.

Several escorts were dispatched to aid the convoy and search for the missing armed yacht. The naval vessels found no remnants and no survivors of Raccoon and the search was abandoned. The body of one crew member and a corner of the wooden bridge structure was found washed up on shore on Anticosti Island a few weeks after the attack. It was only later that it was established that the explosions were the sound of Raccoon's boiler exploding after being hit by a torpedo from U-165.

== Commemoration ==
Le Naufrageur, a microbrewery based in Carleton-sur-Mer, Quebec, brews an Imperial Black IPA named after Raccoon.

== See also ==
- HMS Raccoon – for ships of the Royal Navy
