= HMCS Vegreville =

History

Canada
- Name: Vegreville
- Namesake: Vegreville, Alberta
- Builder: Canadian Vickers Ltd., Montreal
- Laid down: 2 June 1941
- Launched: 7 October 1941
- Commissioned: 10 December 1941
- Decommissioned: 6 June 1945
- Identification: Pennant number:J257
- Honours and awards: Atlantic 1944, Normandy 1944, Gulf of St. Lawrence 1942
- Fate: Scrapped 1947

General characteristics
- Class & type: Bangor-class minesweeper
- Displacement: 672 long tons (683 t)
- Length: 180 ft (54.9 m) oa
- Beam: 28 ft 6 in (8.7 m)
- Draught: 9 ft 9 in (3.0 m)
- Propulsion: 2 Admiralty 3-drum water tube boilers, 2 shafts, vertical triple-expansion reciprocating engines, 2,400 ihp (1,790 kW)
- Speed: 16.5 knots (31 km/h)
- Complement: 83
- Armament: 1 × 12-pounder (3 in (76 mm)) 12 cwt HA gun or QF 3-inch (76 mm) 20 cwt gun; 1 x QF 2 pdr Mark VIII; 2 × QF 20 mm Oerlikon guns; 40 depth charges as escort

HMCS Vegreville was a Bangor-class minesweeper that served in the Royal Canadian Navy during the Second World War. She saw action in the Battle of the St. Lawrence, Battle of the Atlantic and the Invasion of Normandy. She was broken up after the war in 1947. She was named for Vegreville, Alberta.

== Design and description ==
A British design, the Bangor-class minesweepers were smaller than the preceding Halcyon-class minesweepers in British service, but larger than the Fundy class in Canadian service. They came in two versions powered by different engines; those with a diesel engines and those with vertical triple-expansion steam engines. Vegreville was of the latter design and was larger than her diesel-engined cousins. Vegreville was 180 feet (54.9 m) long overall, had a beam of 28 feet 6 inches (8.7 m) and a draught of 9 feet 9 inches (3.0 m). The minesweeper had a displacement of 672 long tons (683 t). She had a complement of 6 officers and 77 enlisted.

Vegreville had two vertical triple-expansion steam engines, each driving one shaft, using steam provided by two Admiralty three-drum boilers. The engines produced a total of 2,400 indicated horsepower (1,800 kW) and gave a maximum speed of 16.5 knots (30.6 km/h; 19.0 mph). The minesweeper could carry a maximum of 150 long tons (152 t) of fuel oil.

In general, Bangor-class minesweepers were armed with either a single quick-firing (QF) 12-pounder (3 in (76 mm)) 12 cwt HA gun or a QF 3-inch (76 mm) 20 cwt gun mounted forward. (Note: "Cwt" is the abbreviation for hundredweight, 20 cwt referring to the weight of the gun.) The ships were also fitted with a QF 2-pounder Mark VIII aft and were eventually fitted with single-mounted QF 20 mm Oerlikon guns on the bridge wings. The 2-pounder gun aboard Vegreville was replaced by a powered twin 20 mm Oerlikon mount. Those ships assigned to convoy duty were armed with two depth charge launchers and four chutes to deploy their 40 depth charges. Vegreville was equipped with LL and SA minesweeping gear to counter magnetic and acoustic naval mines.

== Service history ==
Vegreville was ordered as part of the 1940–41 shipbuilding programme. The minesweeper's keel was laid down on 2 June 1941 by Canadian Vickers Ltd. at Montreal, Quebec. The ship was launched on 7 October later that year. Vegreville was commissioned into the Royal Canadian Navy on 10 December 1941 at Montreal with the pennant number J257.

After commissioning, Vegreville was assigned to the Western Local Escort Force as a convoy escort. In June 1942 she was reassigned to the Gulf Escort Force and moved again in September to Newfoundland Force.

In January 1944, Vegreville was ordered to the United Kingdom as part of Canada's contribution to the invasion of Normandy. In the lead up to the invasion, she moved between the 32nd, 31st and finally the 14th Minesweeping Flotilla, with whom she fought with on D-Day. The 14th flotilla was assigned to sweep channel 2 of mines in the American sector. During the night of 5–6 June, the flotilla swept the assault channel unmolested by German shore positions. The 14th Minesweeping Flotilla resumed minesweeping activities an hour after the assault began on 6 June. They swept Baie de la Seine until 13 June. The 14th flotilla continued minesweeping activities in the invasion area until 21 June. Vegreville remained in UK waters until September of that year.

In September 1944, Vegreville returned to Canada and underwent a refit at Sydney. Following its completion, the ship was ordered back to the UK, arriving in February 1945. She joined the 31st Minesweeping Flotilla after returning to the UK. In April 1945, the 31st Minesweeping Flotilla joined the last large-scale combined operation in the European theatre in an attack on German naval bases in France that had been left untouched by Allied war effort to that point. Departing Plymouth on 12 April, the 31st Minesweeping Flotilla began operations in the mouth of the Gironde estuary on 14 April. They completed their duties on 16 April, unmolested by the Germans. While returning to Plymouth, the flotilla encountered a German trawler and captured it. On 23 April 1945 she suffered severe damage to her port engine in the English Channel off France and was forced to return to port. Once there she was declared a total constructive loss and beyond economical repair. She was paid off on 6 June 1945 and laid up at Falmouth. The ship remained there until taken to Hayle in May 1947 to be broken up.

== See also ==
- List of ships of the Canadian Navy
