= HMCS Weyburn =

Flower-class corvette

Coordinates: 35°46′N 6°2′W

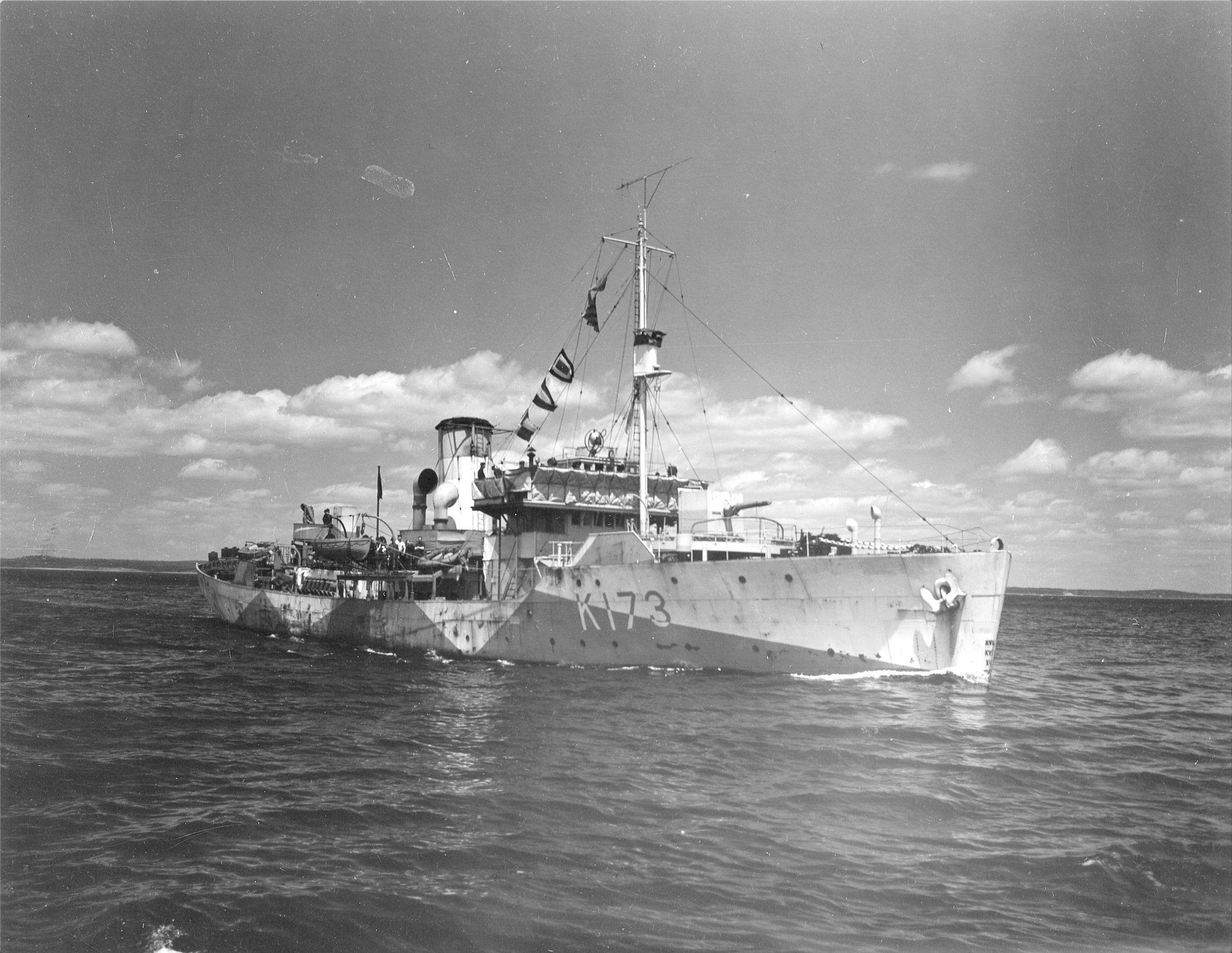
- HMCS Weyburn, circa 1942-1943

History

Canada
- Name: Weyburn
- Namesake: Weyburn, Saskatchewan
- Ordered: 1 February 1940
- Builder: Port Arthur Shipbuilding Company, Port Arthur
- Laid down: 21 December 1940
- Launched: 26 July 1941
- Commissioned: 26 November 1941
- Out of service: 22 February 1943
- Identification: Pennant number: K173
- Honours and awards: Atlantic 1942, North Africa 1942-43, Gulf of St. Lawrence 1942
- Fate: Sunk by mine 1943

General characteristics
- Class & type: Flower-class corvette (original)
- Displacement: 925 long tons (940 t; 1,036 short tons)
- Length: 205 ft (62.48 m)o/a
- Beam: 33 ft (10.06 m)
- Draught: 11.5 ft (3.51 m)
- Propulsion: single shaft; 2 × fire tube Scotch boilers; 1 × 4-cycle triple-expansion reciprocating steam engine; 2,750 ihp (2,050 kW)
- Speed: 16 knots (29.6 km/h)
- Range: 3,500 nautical miles (6,482 km) at 12 knots (22.2 km/h)
- Complement: 85
- Sensors & processing systems: 1 × SW1C or 2C radar; 1 × Type 123A or Type 127DV sonar
- Armament: 1 × BL 4 in (102 mm) Mk.IX gun; 2 × .50 cal machine gun (twin); 2 × Lewis .303 cal machine gun (twin); 2 × Mk.II depth charge throwers; 2 × depth charge rails with 40 depth charges

HMCS Weyburn was a Royal Canadian Navy Flower-class corvette which took part in convoy escort duties during the Second World War. She fought primarily in the Battle of the Atlantic. She was named for Weyburn, Saskatchewan. She was sunk by mine in 1943.

== Background ==
Flower-class corvettes like Weyburn serving with the Royal Canadian Navy during the Second World War were different from earlier and more traditional sail-driven corvettes. The "corvette" designation was created by the French as a class of small warships; the Royal Navy borrowed the term for a period but discontinued its use in 1877. During the hurried preparations for war in the late 1930s, Winston Churchill reactivated the corvette class, needing a name for smaller ships used in an escort capacity, in this case based on a whaling ship design. The generic name "flower" was used to designate the class of these ships, which – in the Royal Navy – were named after flowering plants.

Corvettes commissioned by the Royal Canadian Navy during the Second World War were named after communities for the most part, to better represent the people who took part in building them. This idea was put forth by Admiral Percy W. Nelles. Sponsors were commonly associated with the community for which the ship was named. Royal Navy corvettes were designed as open sea escorts, while Canadian corvettes were developed for coastal auxiliary roles which was exemplified by their minesweeping gear. Eventually the Canadian corvettes would be modified to allow them to perform better on the open seas.

== Construction ==
Weyburn was ordered 1 February 1940 as part of the 1939-1940 Flower-class building program. She was laid down at Port Arthur Shipbuilding Company, Port Arthur on 21 December 1940 and launched on 26 July 1941. She was commissioned 26 November 1941 at Montreal, Quebec.

During her career, Weyburn underwent two major refits, one not soon after entering service. It took place at Halifax beginning in March 1942 and completing in April. Her second refit took place at Liverpool where she had extra AA weaponry in the form of two additional 20-mm Oerlikons put in place. She never had her fo'c'sle extended.

== War service ==
Weyburn was initially assigned to Halifax Force but needed repairs soon after entering service. She joined the Western Local Escort Force (WLEF) after workups. In July 1942, Weyburn was reassigned to the Gulf Escort Force, escorting convoys from Quebec to Sydney, Nova Scotia as the U-boat threat had penetrated the Gulf of St. Lawrence. During her time with the force, she rescued 42 survivors from the torpedoed British merchant Frederika Lensen in the Gulf of St.Lawrence near Anticosti Island.

In September 1942, Weyburn was among the Canadian corvettes assigned to Operation Torch, the invasion of North Africa. En route across the Atlantic she picked up three survivors from the British tanker Athelsultan that had been torpedoed southeast of Cape Farewell. She arrived in the United Kingdom in October and went to Liverpool for a refit that involved adding extra anti-aircraft armaments. In November 1942, Weyburn sailed on her first Torch convoy and continued in this service until February 1943.

=== Sinking ===
On 22 February 1943, Weyburn struck a mine east of Gibraltar which had been laid by the German submarine U-118 three weeks earlier. The mine ripped open the portside amidships, splitting the funnel from bottom to top, buckling the decks. The sea entered the engine room causing pipes to burst. After the initial explosion, all firing pins from the depth charges were safely removed except for two, which had jammed. This was done in hope that, should the ship sink, the depth charges would not explode as the ship went under.

HMS Wivern came to Weyburn's aid, nudging her bow against the corvette's stern to take the crew off. Roughly twenty minutes into the rescue operation, something gave way inside Weyburn and the ship sank. As the ship sank the two depth charges whose pins had not been removed exploded, killing those in the water and killing and severely injuring members of the Wivern's crew in the forward half of the ship. Wivern herself was severely damaged and had to be towed back to port.
