= German submarine U-517 =

German World War II submarine

Coordinates: 46°16′N 17°09′W

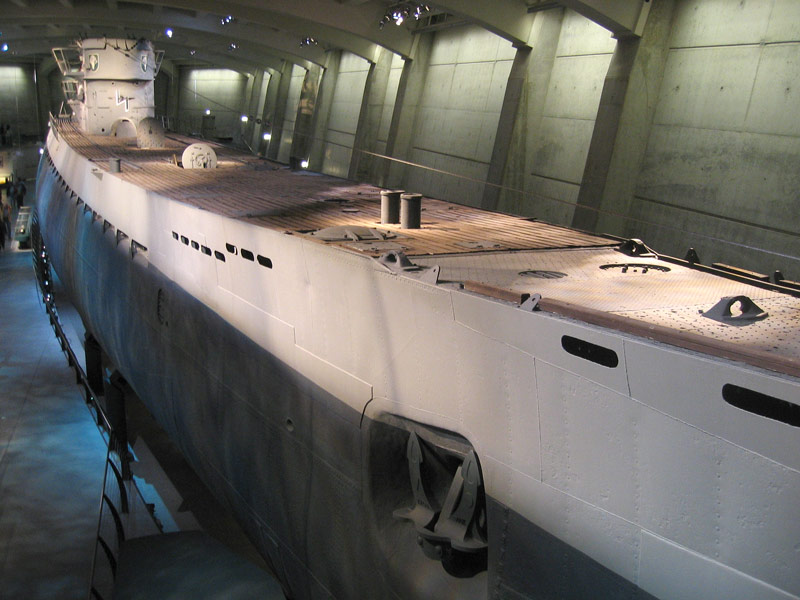
- U-505, a typical Type IXC boat

History

Nazi Germany
- Name: U-517
- Ordered: 14 February 1940
- Builder: Deutsche Werft, Hamburg
- Yard number: 313
- Laid down: 5 June 1941
- Launched: 30 December 1941
- Commissioned: 21 March 1942
- Fate: Sunk on 21 November 1942

General characteristics
- Class & type: Type IXC submarine
- Displacement: 1,120 t (1,100 long tons) surfaced; 1,232 t (1,213 long tons) submerged
- Length: 76.76 m (251 ft 10 in) o/a; 58.75 m (192 ft 9 in) pressure hull
- Beam: 6.76 m (22 ft 2 in) o/a; 4.40 m (14 ft 5 in) pressure hull
- Height: 9.60 m (31 ft 6 in)
- Draught: 4.70 m (15 ft 5 in)
- Installed power: 4,400 PS (3,200 kW; 4,300 bhp) (diesels); 1,000 PS (740 kW; 990 shp) (electric)
- Propulsion: 2 shafts; 2 × diesel engines; 2 × electric motors
- Speed: 18.3 knots (33.9 km/h; 21.1 mph) surfaced; 7.3 knots (13.5 km/h; 8.4 mph) submerged
- Range: 13,450 nmi (24,910 km; 15,480 mi) at 10 knots (19 km/h; 12 mph) surfaced; 63 nmi (117 km; 72 mi) at 4 knots (7.4 km/h; 4.6 mph) submerged
- Test depth: 230 m (750 ft)
- Complement: 4 officers, 44 enlisted
- Armament: 6 × torpedo tubes (4 bow, 2 stern); 22 × 53.3 cm (21 in) torpedoes; 1 × 10.5 cm (4.1 in) SK C/32 deck gun (180 rounds); 1 × 3.7 cm (1.5 in) SK C/30 AA gun; 1 × 2 cm FlaK 30 AA guns

Service record
- Part of: 4th U-boat Flotilla 21 March – 31 August 1942; 10th U-boat Flotilla 1 September – 21 November 1942
- Identification codes: M 41 996
- Commanders: Kptlt. Paul Hartwig; 21 March – 21 November 1942
- Operations: 2 patrols: 1st patrol: 8 August – 19 October 1942; 2nd patrol: 17 – 21 November 1942
- Victories: 8 merchant ships sunk (26,383 GRT); 1 warship sunk (900 tons)

German submarine U-517 was a Type IXC U-boat of the Nazi Germany's Kriegsmarine during World War II.

She was laid down at the Deutsche Werft in Hamburg as yard number 313 on 5 June 1941, launched on 30 December 1941 and commissioned on 21 March 1942 with Kapitänleutnant Paul Hartwig in command.

U-517 began her service career with training as part of the 4th U-boat Flotilla from 21 March 1942. She was reassigned to the 10th flotilla for operations on 1 September.

She carried out two patrols and sank eight ships. She was sunk by British carrier aircraft on 21 November 1942.

== Design ==
German Type IXC submarines were slightly larger than the original Type IXBs. U-517 had a displacement of 1,120 tonnes (1,100 long tons) when at the surface and 1,232 tonnes (1,213 long tons) while submerged. The U-boat had a total length of 76.76 m (251 ft 10 in), a pressure hull length of 58.75 m (192 ft 9 in), a beam of 6.76 m (22 ft 2 in), a height of 9.60 m (31 ft 6 in), and a draught of 4.70 m (15 ft 5 in). The submarine was powered by two MAN M 9 V 40/46 supercharged four-stroke, nine-cylinder diesel engines producing a total of 4,400 metric horsepower (3,240 kW; 4,340 shp) for use while surfaced, two Siemens-Schuckert 2 GU 345/34 double-acting electric motors producing a total of 1,000 shaft horsepower (1,010 PS; 750 kW) for use while submerged. She had two shafts and two 1.92 m (6 ft) propellers. The boat was capable of operating at depths of up to 230 metres (750 ft).

The submarine had a maximum surface speed of 18.3 knots (33.9 km/h; 21.1 mph) and a maximum submerged speed of 7.3 knots (13.5 km/h; 8.4 mph). When submerged, the boat could operate for 63 nautical miles (117 km; 72 mi) at 4 knots (7.4 km/h; 4.6 mph); when surfaced, she could travel 13,450 nautical miles (24,910 km; 15,480 mi) at 10 knots (19 km/h; 12 mph). U-517 was fitted with six 53.3 cm (21 in) torpedo tubes (four fitted at the bow and two at the stern), 22 torpedoes, one 10.5 cm (4.13 in) SK C/32 naval gun, 180 rounds, and a 3.7 cm (1.5 in) SK C/30 as well as a 2 cm (0.79 in) C/30 anti-aircraft gun. The boat had a complement of forty-eight.

== Service history ==
=== First patrol ===
The boat departed Kiel on 8 August 1942, moved through the North Sea and negotiated the gap between Iceland and the Faroe Islands. She crossed the Atlantic Ocean and attacked Allied shipping in the area of the Gulf of St. Lawrence. Two other type IXC boats U-165 and U-513 left Kiel at about the same time to patrol the same area. These boats were to check if North Atlantic convoys were diversing North, through Canadian waters. to avoid the U-boat packs patrolling in the North Atlantic.

On 27 August the U-517 makes contact with the fast section of convoy SG-6 and sinks the troop transport Chatham, whilst the U-165 attacks the other section of the convoy. On 28 August U-517 finishes off the freighter Arlyn which was damaged earlier by U-165.

U-517 and U-165 move further inland into the St Lawrence river in search of assembly areas of convoys but find nothing. Only on 3 September the U-517 found 2 coastal convoys NL-6 and LN-7. From convoy NL-6, the U-517 sank the Donald Stewart northeast of Cape Whittle. The Canadian escort HMCS Weyburn tried to ram, but the distance between the two vessels was too great. U-517 then evaded a depth charge pattern. A few hours later, she was attacked by a Digby aircraft of No. 10 Squadron RCAF; but the depth charges detonated prematurely, causing more damage to the aircraft than to the U-boat.

On 7 September, U-517 was able to sink 3 ships out of convoy QS-33, which was detected and attacked by U-165 the day before.

The submarine subsequently sank the Canadian corvette HMCS Charlottetown about 5 nautical miles (9.3 km; 5.8 mi) off Cap-Chat on 11 September.

On 15 September U-517 finds the convoy SQ-36 and sinks 2 ships out of that convoy. She brings up U-165 which can also attack and damage 2 ships.

U-517 has no further success in attacks on subsequent convoys and evades on 21 September a ramming attack by the minesweeper Georgian which is part of the convoy escort for SQ-38

U-517 docked at Lorient in occupied France on 19 October 1942.

=== Second patrol and loss ===
The boat departed Lorient on 17 November 1942 and sailed west. She was hardly out of the Bay of Biscay when she was sunk by Fairey Albacores of 817 Naval Air Squadron from the aircraft carrier HMS Victorious on 21 November 1942.

One man died; there were 52 survivors.

== Summary of raiding history ==
Date	Name	Nationality	Tonnage (Note: Merchant ship tonnages are in gross register tons. Military vessels are listed by tons displacement.)	Fate
27 August 1942	Chatham	United States	5,649	Sunk
28 August 1942	Arlyn	United States	3,304	Sunk
3 September 1942	Donald Stewart	Canada	1,781	Sunk
7 September 1942	Mount Pindus	Greece	5,729	Sunk
7 September 1942	Mount Taygetus	Greece	3,286	Sunk
7 September 1942	Oakton	Canada	1,727	Sunk
11 September 1942	HMCS Charlottetown	Royal Canadian Navy	900	Sunk
15 September 1942	Inger Elisabeth	Norway	2,166	Sunk
15 September 1942	Saturnus	Netherlands	2,741	Sunk

== Bibliography ==
- Busch, Rainer; Röll, Hans-Joachim (1999). German U-boat commanders of World War II: a biographical dictionary. Translated by Brooks, Geoffrey. London, Annapolis, Md: Greenhill Books, Naval Institute Press. ISBN 1-55750-186-6.
- Busch, Rainer; Röll, Hans-Joachim (1999). Deutsche U-Boot-Verluste von September 1939 bis Mai 1945 [German U-boat losses from September 1939 to May 1945]. Der U-Boot-Krieg (in German). Vol. IV. Hamburg, Berlin, Bonn: Mittler. ISBN 3-8132-0514-2.
- Gröner, Erich (1985). Die deutschen Kriegsschiffe 1815–1945 / 3, U-Boote, Hilfskreuzer, Minenschiffe, Netzleger, Sperrbrecher (in German). Koblenz: Bernard & Graefe. ISBN 3-7637-4802-4. OCLC 310610321.
- Gröner, Erich; Jung, Dieter; Maass, Martin (1991). U-boats and Mine Warfare Vessels. German Warships 1815–1945. Vol. 2. Translated by Thomas, Keith; Magowan, Rachel. London: Conway Maritime Press. ISBN 0-85177-593-4.
- Rohwer, J.; Hummelchen, G. (1992). Chronology of the War at Sea 1939–1945. Naval Institute Press. ISBN 1-55750-105-X.
- Blair, Clay. Hitler's U-Boat War [Volume 2]: The Hunted 1942–1945. Cassell. ISBN 0-304-35261-6.
- Bezemer, K.W.L. (1987). Geschiedenis van de Nederlands koopvaardij in de Tweede Wereldoorlog (in Dutch) (3rd ed.). Amsterdam: Elsevier. ISBN 90-10-06040-3.
