= German submarine U-165 (1941) =

German World War II submarine

Coordinates: 47°05′N 5°30′W

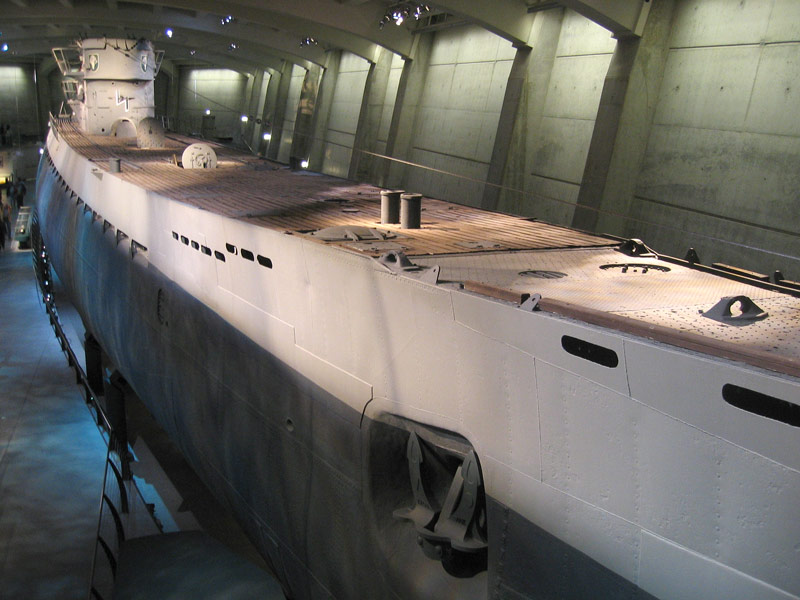
- U-505, a typical Type IXC boat

History

Nazi Germany
- Name: U-165
- Ordered: 25 September 1939
- Builder: DeSchiMAG, Bremen
- Yard number: 704
- Laid down: 30 August 1940
- Launched: 15 August 1941
- Commissioned: 3 February 1942
- Fate: Sunk on 27 September 1942

General characteristics
- Class & type: Type IXC submarine
- Displacement: 1,120 t (1,100 long tons) surfaced; 1,232 t (1,213 long tons) submerged
- Length: 76.76 m (251 ft 10 in) o/a; 58.75 m (192 ft 9 in) pressure hull
- Beam: 6.76 m (22 ft 2 in) o/a; 4.40 m (14 ft 5 in) pressure hull
- Height: 9.60 m (31 ft 6 in)
- Draught: 4.70 m (15 ft 5 in)
- Installed power: 4,400 PS (3,200 kW; 4,300 bhp) (diesels); 1,000 PS (740 kW; 990 shp) (electric)
- Propulsion: 2 shafts; 2 × diesel engines; 2 × electric motors
- Speed: 18.3 knots (33.9 km/h; 21.1 mph) surfaced; 7.3 knots (13.5 km/h; 8.4 mph) submerged
- Range: 13,450 nmi (24,910 km; 15,480 mi) at 10 knots (19 km/h; 12 mph) surfaced; 64 nmi (119 km; 74 mi) at 4 knots (7.4 km/h; 4.6 mph) submerged
- Test depth: 230 m (750 ft)
- Complement: 4 officers, 44 enlisted
- Armament: 6 × torpedo tubes (4 bow, 2 stern); 22 × 53.3 cm (21 in) torpedoes; 1 × 10.5 cm (4.1 in) SK C/32 deck gun (180 rounds); 1 × 3.7 cm (1.5 in) SK C/30 AA gun; 1 × twin 2 cm FlaK 30 AA guns

Service record
- Part of: 4th U-boat Flotilla; 3 February – 31 August 1942; 10th U-boat Flotilla; 1 – 27 September 1942
- Identification codes: M 47 655
- Commanders: F.Kapt. Eberhard Hoffmann; 3 February – 27 September 1942
- Operations: 1 patrol: 7 August – 27 September 1942
- Victories: 2 merchant ships sunk (8,396 GRT); 1 auxiliary warship sunk (358 GRT); 3 merchant ships damaged (14,499 GRT); 1 auxiliary warship damaged (7,252 GRT)

German submarine U-165 was a Type IXC U-boat of Nazi Germany's Kriegsmarine built for service during World War II. The keel for this boat was laid down on 30 August 1940 at the Deutsche Schiff- und Maschinenbau AG, Bremen yard as yard number 704. She was launched on 15 August 1941 and commissioned on 3 February 1942 under the command of Fregattenkapitän Eberhard Hoffmann.

The U-boat's service began with training as part of the 4th U-boat Flotilla. She then moved to the 10th flotilla on 1 September 1942 for operations. She sank two ships, totalling 8,396 gross register tons (GRT), one auxiliary warship of 358 GRT and damaged three others, for 14,499 GRT. She also damaged one auxiliary warship (7,252 GRT).

An RAF aircraft with a Czechoslovak crew sank her on 27 September 1942.

== Design ==
German Type IXC submarines were slightly larger than the original Type IXBs. U-165 had a displacement of 1,120 tonnes (1,100 long tons) when at the surface and 1,232 tonnes (1,213 long tons) while submerged. The U-boat had a total length of 76.76 m (251 ft 10 in), a pressure hull length of 58.75 m (192 ft 9 in), a beam of 6.76 m (22 ft 2 in), a height of 9.60 m (31 ft 6 in), and a draught of 4.70 m (15 ft 5 in). The submarine was powered by two MAN M 9 V 40/46 supercharged four-stroke, nine-cylinder diesel engines producing a total of 4,400 metric horsepower (3,240 kW; 4,340 shp) for use while surfaced, two Siemens-Schuckert 2 GU 345/34 double-acting electric motors producing a total of 1,000 metric horsepower (740 kW; 990 shp) for use while submerged. She had two shafts and two 1.92 m (6 ft) propellers. The boat was capable of operating at depths of up to 230 metres (750 ft).

The submarine had a maximum surface speed of 18.3 knots (33.9 km/h; 21.1 mph) and a maximum submerged speed of 7.3 knots (13.5 km/h; 8.4 mph). When submerged, the boat could operate for 63 nautical miles (117 km; 72 mi) at 4 knots (7.4 km/h; 4.6 mph); when surfaced, she could travel 13,450 nautical miles (24,910 km; 15,480 mi) at 10 knots (19 km/h; 12 mph). U-165 was fitted with six 53.3 cm (21 in) torpedo tubes (four fitted at the bow and two at the stern), 22 torpedoes, one 10.5 cm (4.13 in) SK C/32 naval gun, 180 rounds, and a 3.7 cm (1.5 in) SK C/30 as well as a 2 cm (0.79 in) C/30 anti-aircraft gun. The boat had a complement of forty-eight.

== Service history ==
=== Patrol ===
The submarine's only patrol took her from Kiel on 7 August 1942, across the North Sea and into the northern Atlantic Ocean via through the gap between Iceland and the Faroe Islands to the Gulf of St. Lawrence.

Her first victims were USS Laramie and Arlyn; both damaged during an attack on convoy SG-6 at the northern end of the Belle Isle Strait on 28 August. One of the ships was then finished off by U-517.

On 6 September U-165 found convoy QS-33 and during several attacks sank the freighter Aeas and the escort HMCS Raccoon.

On 15 September U-517 attacks convoy SQ-36, and signals U-165 which can attack the next day. U-165 can sink one ship out of the convoy and damage two more ships.

=== Loss ===
U-165 had almost reached the French Atlantic ports when on 27 September 1942 an RAF Coastal Command Vickers Wellington 1C on patrol from RAF Talbenny found her on the surface just west of the Bay of Biscay. The Wellington, with serial number Z1147 and code letters KX-Q, belonged to No. 311 Squadron RAF, whose aircrew were Czechoslovaks.

The pilot, Plt Off Václav Študent, attacked at an altitude of 70 feet (21 m). His navigator and bomb aimer, Flt Lt Václav Kadaně, aimed six depth charges at U-165. Their explosions lifted the U-boat out of the water, but she managed to submerge to escape further attack.

Shrapnel wounded three of the Wellington's crew, including the co-pilot, and a fourth crew member lost a finger. The machine gun fire also damaged the aircraft's hydraulic equipment. Študent broke off the attack, and at 19:58 hrs crash-landed the Wellington at St Eval, Cornwall. Two of the wounded Czechoslovak crew were hospitalised. However, the attack succeeded in sinking U-165.

In older sources, the U-165 is listed as being lost to unknown causes, or to have run on a mine.

== Summary of raiding history ==
Date	Name	Nationality	Tonnage (Note: Merchant ship tonnages are in gross register tons. Military vessels are listed by tons displacement.)	Fate
28 August 1942	USS Laramie	United States Navy	7,252	Damaged
28 August 1942	Arlyn	United States	3,304	Damaged
6 September 1942	Aeas	Greece	4,729	Sunk
7 September 1942	HMCS Raccoon	Royal Canadian Navy	358	Sunk
16 September 1942	Essex Lance	United Kingdom	6,625	Damaged
16 September 1942	Joanis	Greece	3,667	Sunk
16 September 1942	Pan York	United States	4,570	Damaged

== Bibliography ==
- Busch, Rainer; Röll, Hans-Joachim (1999). German U-boat commanders of World War II: a biographical dictionary. Translated by Brooks, Geoffrey. London, Annapolis, Md: Greenhill Books, Naval Institute Press. ISBN 1-55750-186-6.
- Busch, Rainer; Röll, Hans-Joachim (1999). Deutsche U-Boot-Verluste von September 1939 bis Mai 1945 [German U-boat losses from September 1939 to May 1945]. Der U-Boot-Krieg (in German). Vol. IV. Hamburg, Berlin, Bonn: Mittler. ISBN 3-8132-0514-2.
- Gröner, Erich; Jung, Dieter; Maass, Martin (1991). U-boats and Mine Warfare Vessels. German Warships 1815–1945. Vol. 2. Translated by Thomas, Keith; Magowan, Rachel. London: Conway Maritime Press. ISBN 0-85177-593-4.
- Rohwer, J.; Hummelchen, G. (1992). Chronology of the War at Sea 1939–1945. Naval Institute Press. ISBN 1-55750-105-X.
- Blair, Clay (2000). Hitler's U-Boat War [Volume 2]: The Hunted 1942–1945. Cassell. ISBN 0-304-35261-6.
