= Flower-class corvette =

World War II British corvette class

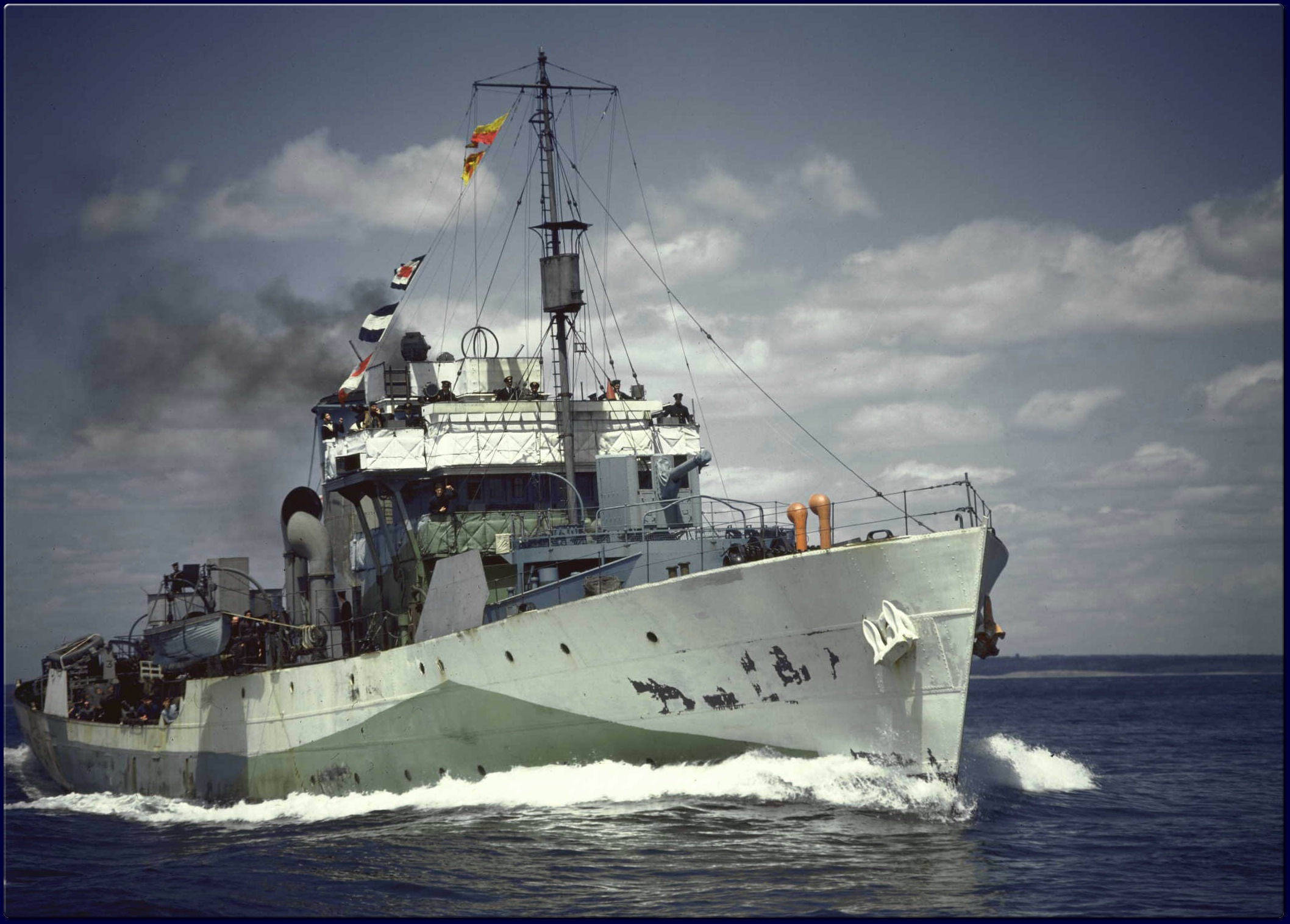
- HMCS Regina, 1942–1943

Class overview
- Operators: During World War II (Allies): Royal Navy; Royal Canadian Navy; United States Navy; Free French Naval Forces; (Belgium) Free Belgian Navy; (Greece) Royal Hellenic Navy; Royal Indian Navy; Royal Netherlands Navy; Royal New Zealand Navy; Royal Norwegian Navy; South African Navy; Royal Yugoslav Navy; During World War II (Axis)—seized during construction: Kriegsmarine; After World War II: Argentine Navy; Chilean Navy; Royal Danish Navy; Dominican Navy; Egyptian Navy; (Greece) Royal Hellenic Navy; Royal Indian Navy; Israeli Navy; Irish Naval Service; South African Navy; Bolivarian Navy of Venezuela; People's Liberation Army Navy; Royal Thai Navy; Yugoslav Navy
- Succeeded by: Castle class
- Completed: 225 (original), 69 (modified)
- Cancelled: 5 (original), 6 (modified)
- Lost: 33 World War II (22 to submarines)
- Preserved: HMCS Sackville

General characteristics Original Flower-class corvette
- Type: Corvette
- Displacement: 925 long tons (940 t; 1,036 short tons)
- Length: 205 ft (62.5 m) o/a
- Beam: 33 ft (10.1 m)
- Draught: 11.5 ft (3.51 m)
- Propulsion: 1939–1940 programme; Single shaft; 2 × fire tube Scotch boilers; 1 × double acting triple-expansion reciprocating steam engine; 2,750 ihp (2,050 kW); 1940–1941 programme; single shaft; 2 × water tube three-drum boilers; 1 × double acting triple-expansion reciprocating steam engine; 2,750 ihp (2,050 kW)
- Speed: 16 knots (29.6 km/h)
- Range: 3,500 nautical miles (6,482 km) at 12 knots (22.2 km/h)
- Complement: 85
- Sensors & processing systems: 1 × SW1C or 2C radar; 1 × Type 123A or Type 127DV sonar
- Armament: 1 × 4-inch BL Mk.IX single gun; 2 × Vickers .50 machine guns (twin); 2 × .303-inch Lewis machine gun (twin); 2 × Mk.II depth charge throwers; 2 × Depth charge rails with 40 depth charges; Originally fitted with minesweeping gear, later removed

General characteristics Modified Flower-class corvette
- Displacement: 1,015 long tons (1,031 t; 1,137 short tons)
- Length: 208 ft (63.4 m)o/a
- Beam: 33 ft (10.1 m)
- Draught: 11 ft (3.35 m)
- Propulsion: single shaft; 2 × water tube boilers; 1 × 4-cylinder triple-expansion reciprocating steam engine; 2,750 ihp (2,050 kW)
- Speed: 16 knots (29.6 km/h)
- Range: 3,500 nautical miles (6,482 km) at 12 knots (22.2 km/h)
- Complement: 90
- Sensors & processing systems: 1 × Type 271 SW2C radar; 1 × Type 144 sonar
- Armament: 1 × 4-inch BL Mk.IX single gun; 1 × 2-pounder. Mk.VIII single "pom-pom" AA gun; 2 × 20 mm Oerlikon single; 1 × Hedgehog A/S mortar; 4 × Mk.II depth charge throwers; 2 depth charge rails with 70 depth charges

The Flower-class corvette (also referred to as the Gladiolus class after the lead ship) was a British class of 294 corvettes used during World War II by the Allied navies particularly as anti-submarine convoy escorts in the Battle of the Atlantic. Royal Navy ships of this class were named after flowers.

Most served during World War II with the Royal Navy (RN) and Royal Canadian Navy (RCN). Several ships built largely in Canada were transferred from the RN to the United States Navy (USN) under the lend-lease programme, seeing service in both navies. Some corvettes transferred to the USN were crewed by the US Coast Guard.

The vessels serving with the US Navy were known as Temptress- and Action-class patrol gunboats. Other Flower-class corvettes served with the Free French Naval Forces, the Royal Netherlands Navy, the Royal Norwegian Navy, the Royal Indian Navy, the Royal Hellenic Navy, the Royal New Zealand Navy, the Royal Yugoslav Navy, and, immediately after the war, the South African Navy.

After World War II many surplus Flower-class vessels were used in other navies, or for civilian use. HMCS Sackville is the only member of the class preserved as a museum ship.

== Class designation ==
The months leading up to World War II saw the RN return to the concept of a small escort warship being used in the shipping protection role. The Flower class was based on the design of Southern Pride, a whale-catcher, and were labelled "corvettes", restoring the title for the RN, although the Flower class has no connection with pre-1877 types.

There are two distinct groups of vessels in this class: the original Flower class, 225 vessels ordered during the 1939 and 1940 building programmes; and the modified Flower class, which followed with a further 69 vessels ordered from 1940 onward. The modified Flowers were slightly larger and better armed.

Flower-class vessels, of original and modified design, in USN service were called Temptress- and Action-class gunboats. They carried the hull classification symbol PG ("patrol gunboat").

== Design ==
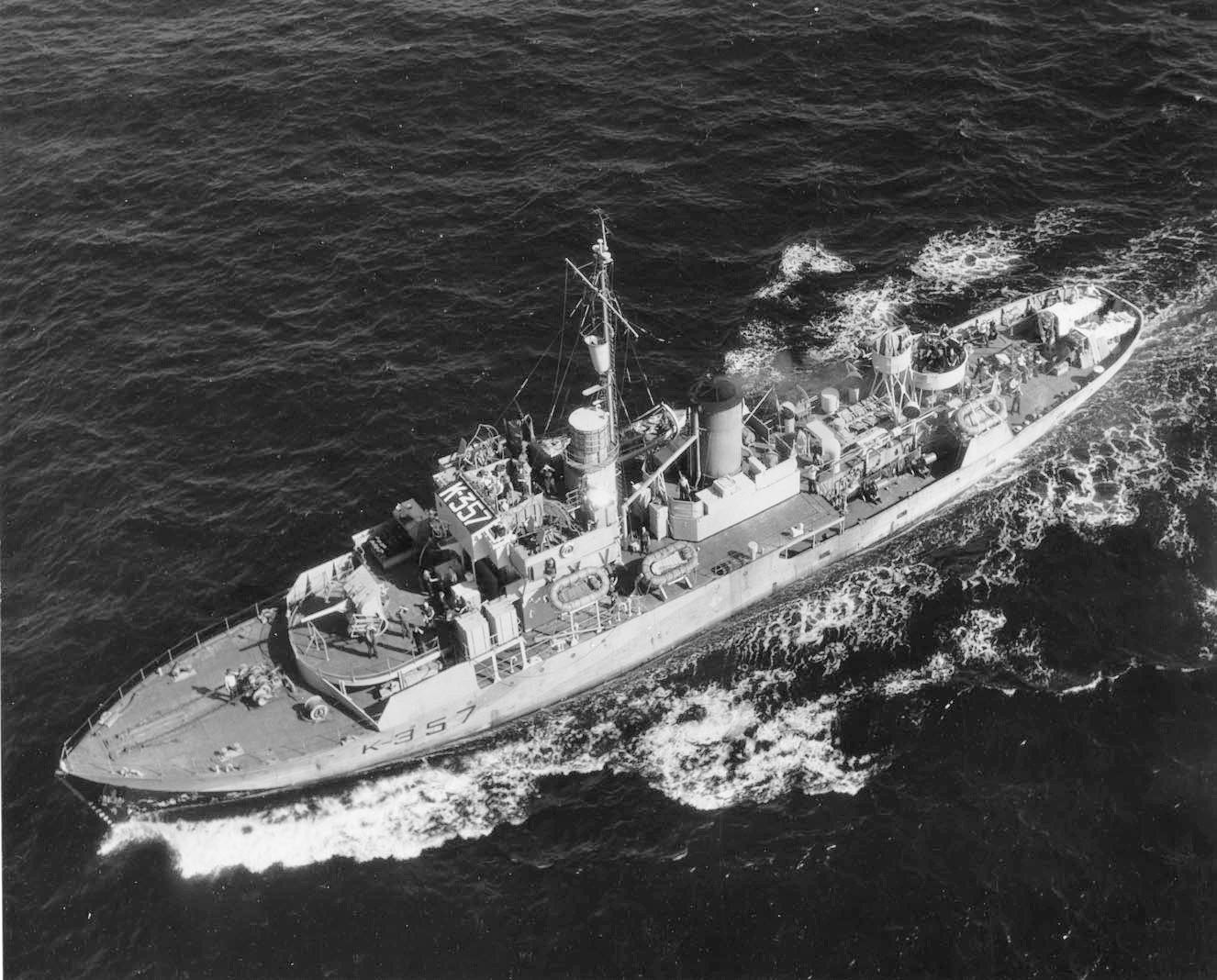
HMCS Riviere du Loup

In early 1939, with the risk of war with Nazi Germany increasing, it was clear to the Royal Navy that it needed more escort ships to counter the threat from Kriegsmarine U-boats. A particular concern was the need to protect shipping off the east coast of Britain. What was needed was something larger and faster than trawlers, but still cheap enough to be built in large numbers, preferably at small merchant shipyards, as larger yards were already busy. To meet this requirement, the Smiths Dock Company of South Bank -on-Tees, a specialist in the design and build of fishing vessels, offered a development of its 700-ton, 16 knots (18 mph; 30 km/h) whaler (whale catcher) Southern Pride.

They were intended as small convoy escort ships that could be produced quickly and cheaply in large numbers. Despite naval planners' intentions that they be deployed for coastal convoys, their long range meant that they became the mainstay of Mid-Ocean Escort Force convoy protection during the first half of the war.

The Flower class became an essential resource for North Atlantic convoy protection until larger vessels such as destroyer escorts and frigates could be produced in sufficient quantities. The simple design of the Flower class using parts and techniques (scantlings) common to merchant shipping meant they could be constructed in small commercial shipyards all over the United Kingdom and Canada, where larger (or more sophisticated) warships could not be built. The use of commercial triple expansion machinery instead of steam turbines meant the largely Royal Naval Reserve and Royal Naval Volunteer Reserve crews that were manning the corvettes would be familiar with their operation.

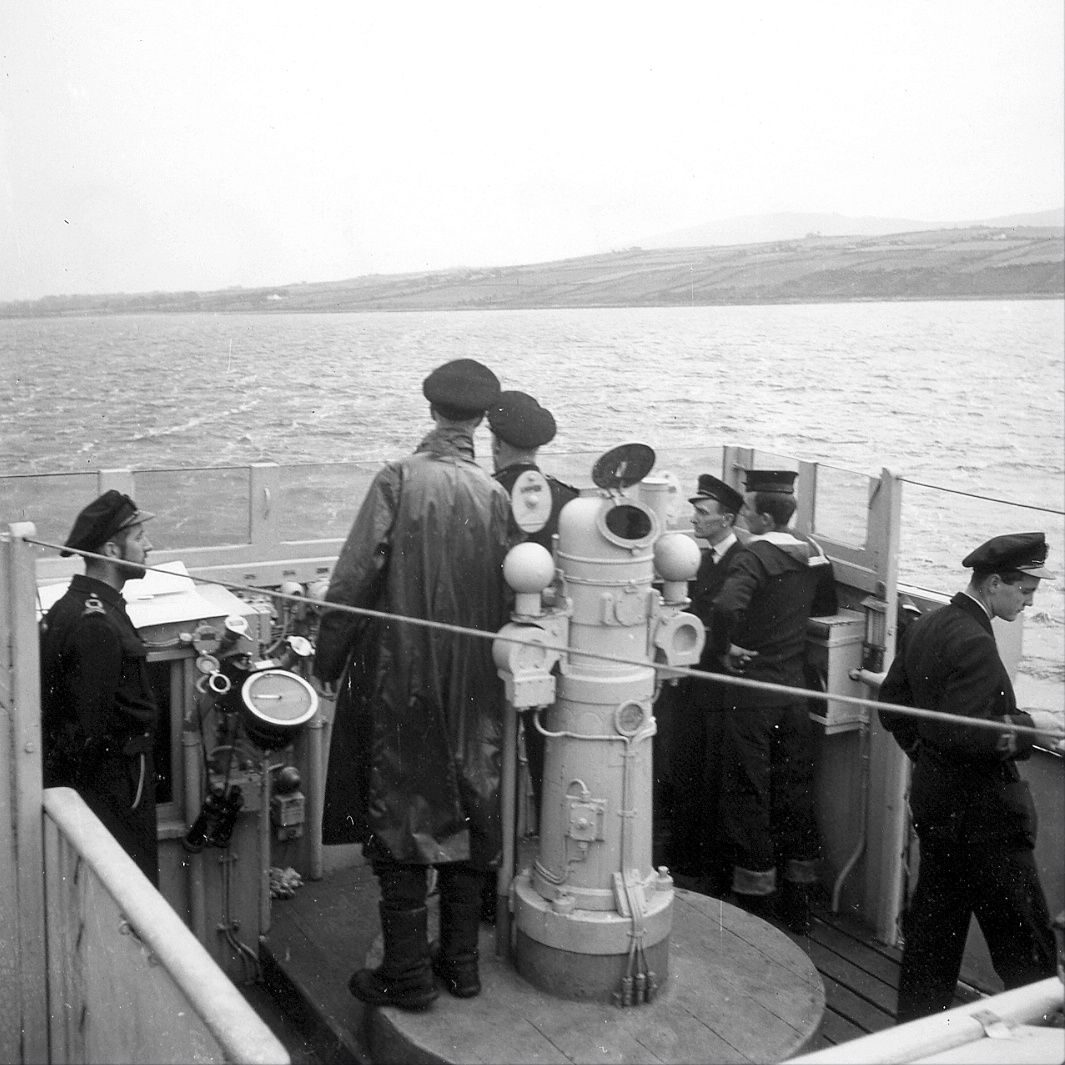
Officers on the open bridge of HMCS Trillium

Flower-class vessels were slow for a warship, with maximum speed of 16 kn (18 mph; 30 km/h). They were also very lightly armed as they were intended solely for anti-submarine warfare; many of the RCN's original Flower-class ships were initially fitted with minesweeping equipment, while virtually all of the modified Flowers were fitted with a limited anti-aircraft capability. The original Flowers had the standard RN layout, consisting of a raised forecastle, a well deck, then the bridge or wheelhouse and a continuous deck running aft. The crew quarters were in the forecastle while the galley was at the rear, making for poor messing arrangements.

The modified Flowers saw the forecastle extended aft past the bridge to the aft end of the funnel, a variation known as the "long forecastle" design. Apart from providing a very useful space where the whole crew could gather out of the weather, the added weight improved the ships' stability and speed and was applied to a number of the original Flower-class vessels during the mid and latter years of the war.

The original Flowers had a mast located immediately forward the bridge, a notable exception to naval practice at that time. The modified Flowers saw the mast returned to the normal position immediately aft of the bridge; this does not seem to have been done in all of the modified builds or conversions of the original vessels. A cruiser stern finished the appearance for all vessels in the class.

== Orders ==
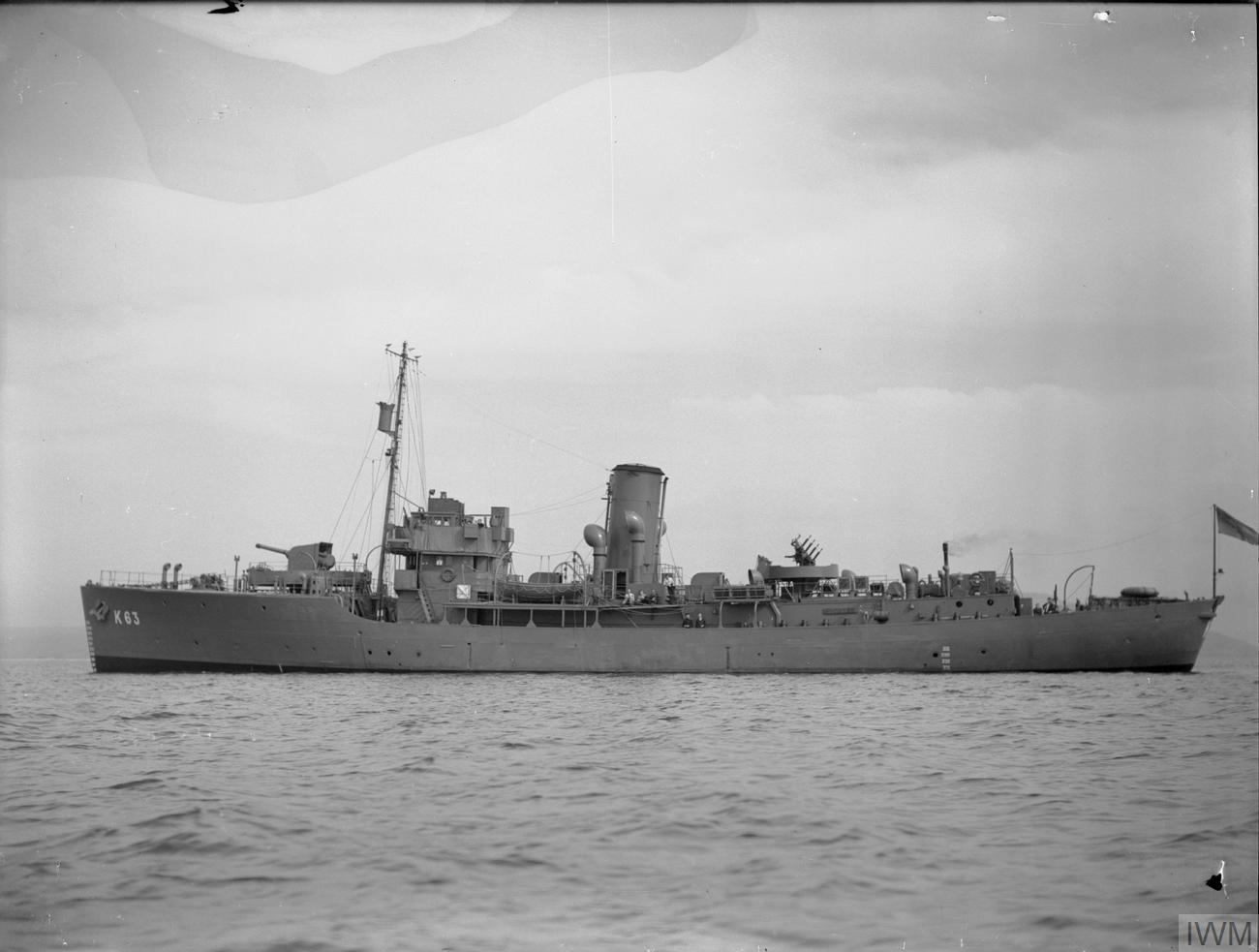
Early Flower corvettes had a mast before the wheel house.

The RN ordered 145 Flower-class corvettes in 1939, the first 26 on 25 July with a further batch of 30 on 31 August, all under the 1939 Pre-War Programme. Following the outbreak of World War II, the British Admiralty ordered another 20 on 19 September (all from Harland & Wolff) under the 1939 War Programme. This was followed by an order for a further ten Flower-class corvettes from other British shipbuilders two days later. Another 18 were ordered on 12 December and two on 15 December, again from British shipbuilders. In January 1940, the RN ordered the last ten vessels under the 1939 War Programme from Canadian shipbuilders.

By the end of January 1940, 116 ships were building or on order to this initial design. The ten vessels ordered from Canadian shipbuilders were transferred to the RCN upon completion. Another four vessels were ordered at Smiths Dock Company for the French Navy, the first ship being completed for the Free French Naval Forces in mid-1940 and the other three being taken over by the RN. Another 31 Flowers were ordered by the RN under the 1940 War Programme but six of these (ordered from Harland & Wolff) were cancelled on 23 January 1941.

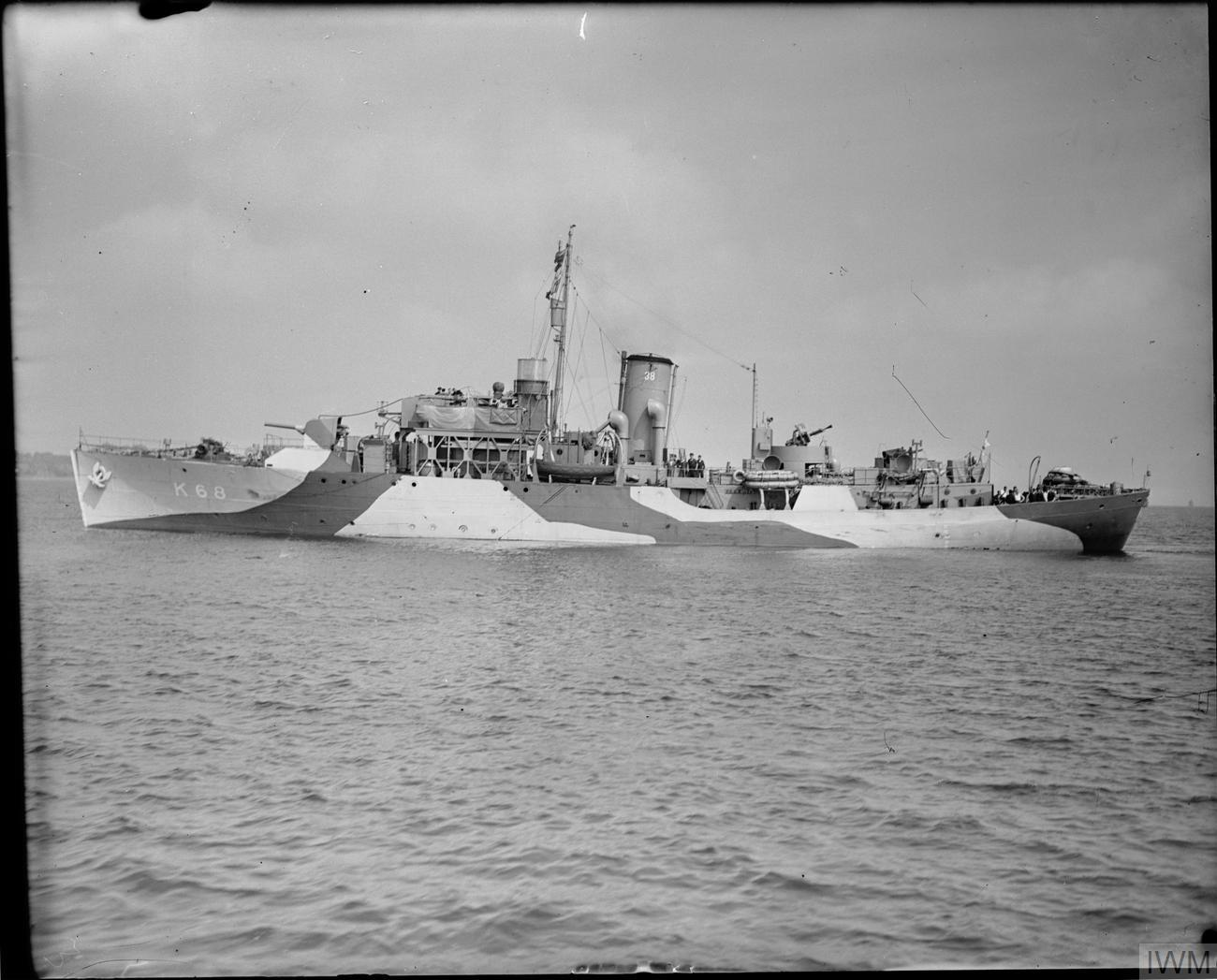
Later corvettes had more flare at the bow and a longer forecastle.

The RN ordered 27 modified Flower-class corvettes under the 1941 and 1942 War Programmes. British shipbuilders were contracted to build seven of these vessels under the 1941 Programme and five vessels under the 1942 Programme; two vessels (one from each year's Programme) were later cancelled. The RN ordered fifteen modified Flowers from Canadian shipyards under the 1941 programme; eight of these were transferred to the USN under reverse Lend-Lease.

The RCN ordered seventy original and 34 modified Flower-class vessels from Canadian shipbuilders. The Canadian shipbuilders also built seven original Flowers ordered by the USN, which were transferred to the RN under the Lend-Lease Programme upon completion, because wartime shipbuilding production in the United States had reached the level where the USN could dispense with vessels it had ordered in Canada. The RCN vessels had several design variations from their RN counterparts: the "bandstand", where the aft pom-pom gun was mounted, was moved to the rear of the superstructure; the galley was also moved forward, immediately abaft the engine room.

Shortly after the outbreak of war the French Navy ordered 18 Flower-class vessels, 12 from UK yards, two from Ateliers et Chantiers de France at Dunkirk and four from Ateliers et Chantiers de Penhoët at Saint-Nazaire. The two At. & Ch. de France ships are listed as "cancelled" but the four Penhoët ships were under construction at the time of the Fall of France and were seized by Nazi Germany. Three were completed for Kriegsmarine service and commissioned in 1943–44 as the Patrouillenboot Ausland patrol ships.

== Armament ==
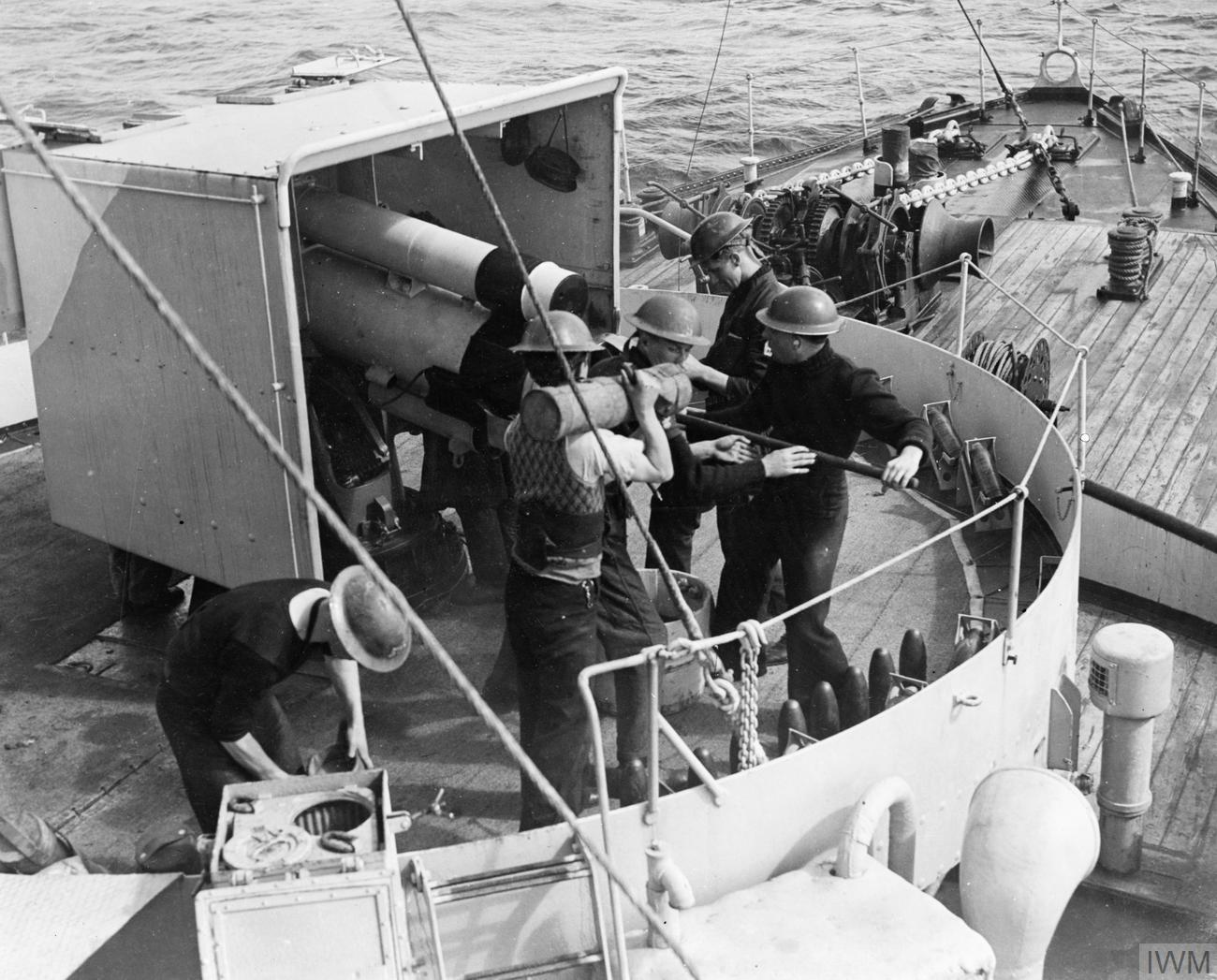
A typical BL 4-inch Mk IX gun mounting, here seen on HMS Vervain

The original Flower class were fitted with a 4-inch (102 mm) gun on the bow, depth charge racks carrying 40 charges on the stern, a minesweeping winch and a 2-pounder (40 mm) pom-pom gun on a "bandstand" over the engine room. Due to shortages, a pair of Lewis guns or quadruple Vickers HMG was sometimes substituted for the pom-pom, which would have left the ship very vulnerable to aircraft attack in its envisaged role of coastal convoy escort and patrol in the North Sea.

The long-range endurance of the vessels, coupled with early war-time shortages of larger escort warships, saw Flowers assigned to trans-Atlantic convoy escort where Luftwaffe aircraft were rarely encountered. Vessels assigned to the Mediterranean Sea usually had more anti-aircraft guns fitted. Underwater detection capability was provided by a fixed ASDIC dome. This was later modified to be retractable. Subsequent inventions such as the High Frequency Radio Direction Finder (Huff-Duff) were later added, along with radar systems, such as the Type 271, which proved particularly effective in low-visibility conditions in the North Atlantic.

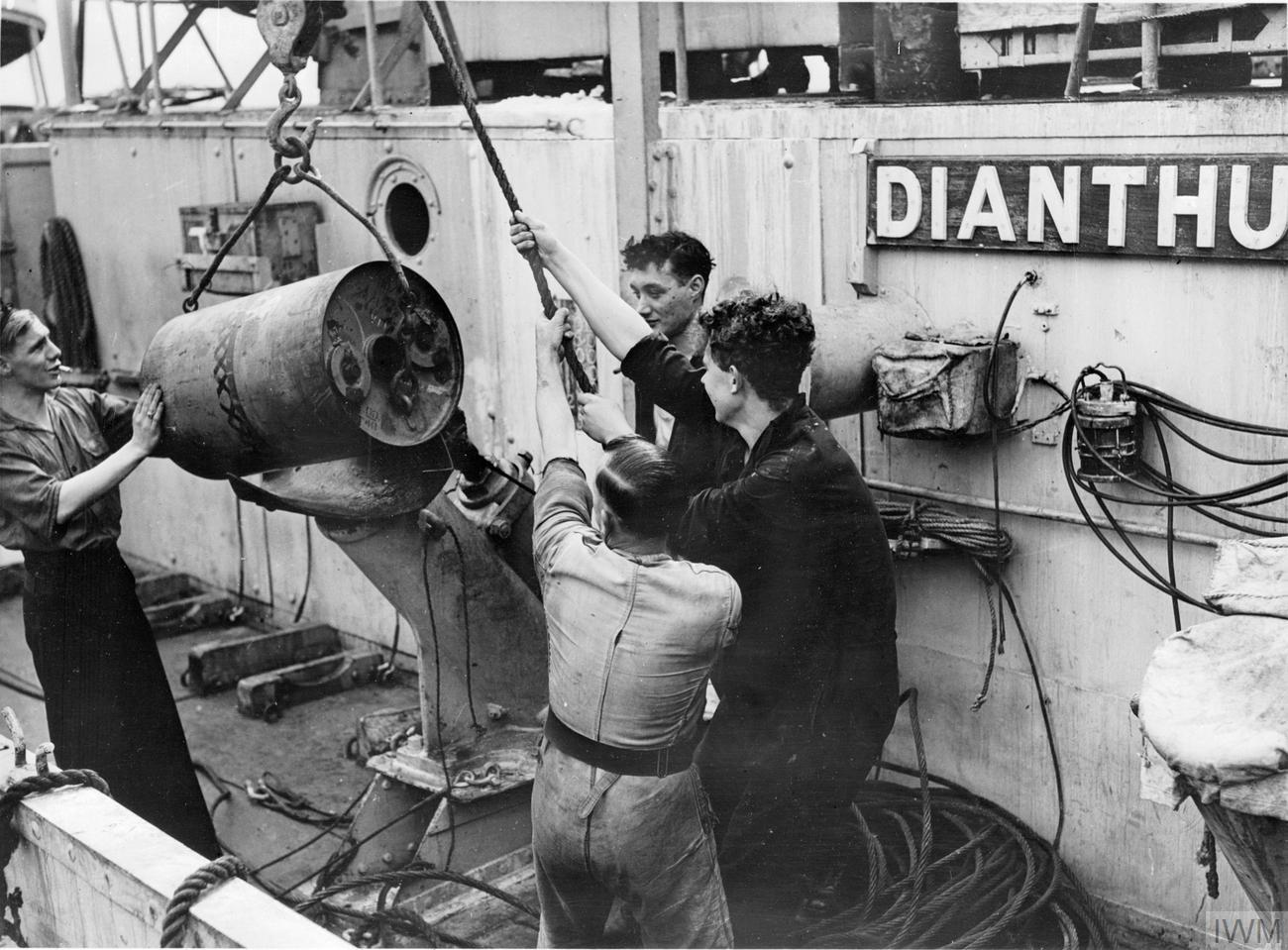
Loading a depth charge thrower on HMS Dianthus

The Flower class were designed for inshore patrol and harbour anti-submarine defence and many required minor modifications when the Allied navies began to use them as trans-Atlantic convoy escorts. These small warships could be supported by any small dockyard or naval station, so many ships came to have a variety of weapons systems and design modifications depending upon when and where they were refitted. There is really no such thing as a 'standard Flower-class corvette'

Several of the major changes that vessels in the class underwent are indicated below, in a typical chronological order:

- Original twin mast configuration changed to single mast in front of the bridge, then moved behind the bridge for improved visibility.
- Heavy minesweeping gear removed for deep-sea escort work and to improve range.
- Galley relocated from the stern to midships.
- Extra depth charge storage racks were fitted at the stern. Later, more depth charges stowed along walkways.
- Hedgehog fitted to enable remote attacks while keeping ASDIC contact.
- Surface radar fitted in a "lantern" housing on the bridge.
- Forecastle lengthened to midships to provide more accommodation and better seaworthiness. Several vessels were given a "three-quarters length" extension.
- Increased flare at the bow. This and the above modification created the modified Flower design for subsequent orders.
- Various changes to the bridge, typically lowering and lengthening it. Enclosed compass house removed.
- Extra twin Lewis guns mounted on the bridge or engine room roof.
- Oerlikon 20 mm cannons fitted, usually two on the bridge wings but sometimes as many as six spread out along the engine-room roof, depending on the theatre of operations.

A ship could have any mix of these, or other specialist one-off modifications. Ships allocated to other navies such as the RCN or USN usually had different armament and deck layouts. A major difference between the RN vessels and the RCN, USN, and other navies' vessels was the provision of upgraded ASDIC and radar. The RN was a world leader in developing these technologies and RN Flowers were somewhat better-equipped for remote detection of enemy submarines. A good example of this is the difficulty that RCN Flowers had in intercepting U-boats with their Canadian-designed SW1C metric radar, while the RN vessels were equipped with the technologically advanced Type 271 centimetric sets. In addition, RCN vessels were incapable of operating gyrocompasses, making ASDIC attacks more difficult.

== Operations ==
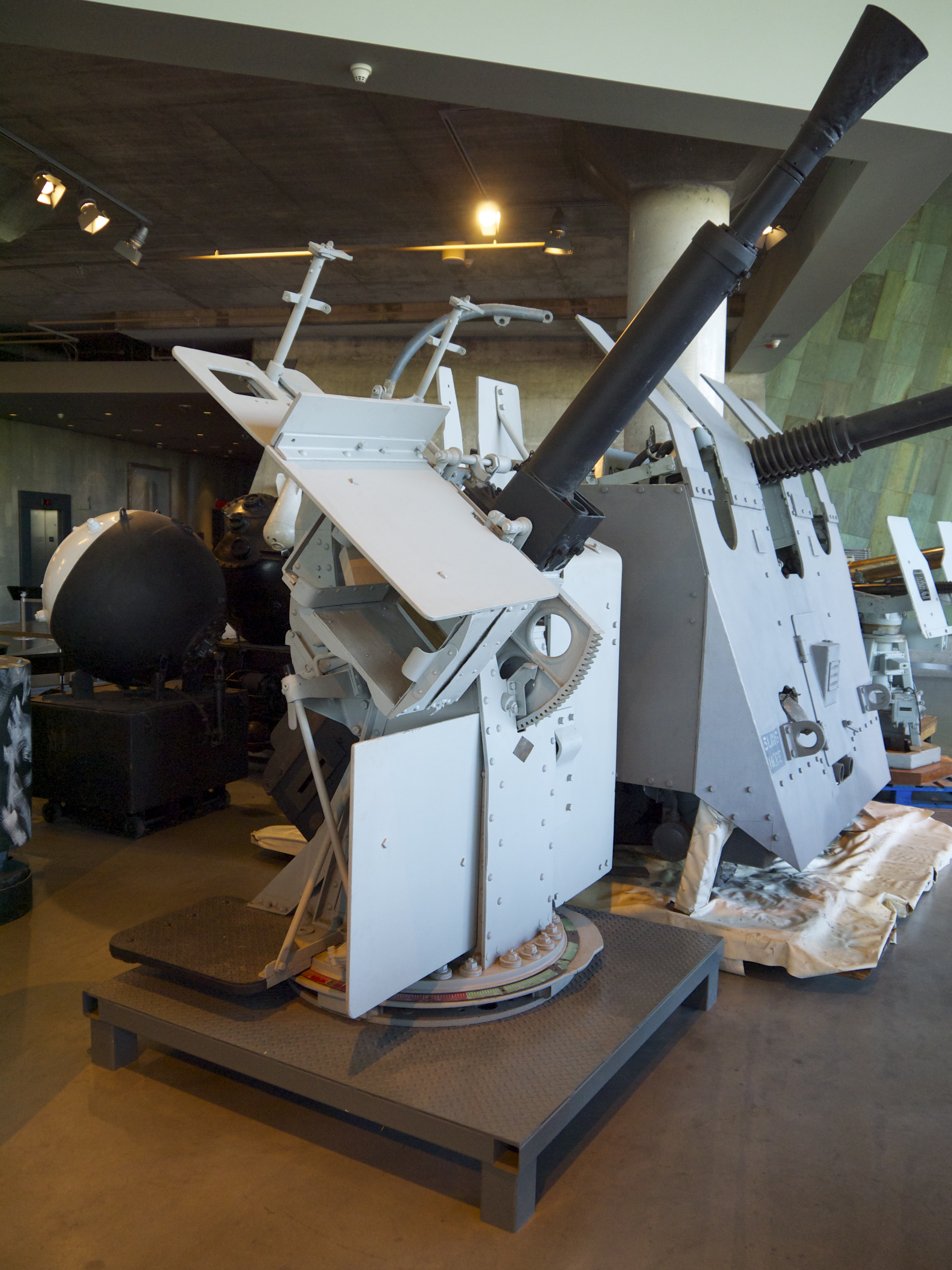
A QF2 Mk. VIII pom-pom gun, from HMCS Kamloops, on display in the Lebreton Gallery of the Canadian War Museum

Flower-class corvettes were used extensively by the RN and RCN in the Battle of the Atlantic. They also saw limited service elsewhere with the RN, as well as the USN and several Allied navies such as the Royal Netherlands Navy, the Royal Norwegian Navy, the Royal Hellenic Navy, the Free French Naval Forces, the Royal Indian Navy, and the Royal New Zealand Navy. The Belgian Navy used some of these vessels during World War II, and have continued to use Flower names for their minehunters. Most Royal Navy Flower-class ships drew their officers and crew from the Royal Naval Reserve and the Royal Navy Volunteer Reserve (RNVR). Many RN Flowers had captains drawn from the Merchant Navy.

Service on Flowers in the North Atlantic was typically cold, wet, monotonous and uncomfortable. Every dip of the forecastle into an oncoming wave was followed by a cascade of water into the well deck amidships. Men at action stations were drenched with spray and water entered living spaces through hatches opened for access to ammunition magazines. Interior decks were constantly wet and condensation dripped from the overheads.

The head (or sanitary toilet) was drained by a straight pipe to the ocean. A reverse flow of the icy North Atlantic would cleanse the backside of those using it during rough weather. By 1941 corvettes carried twice as many crewmen as anticipated in the original design. Men slept on lockers or tabletops or in any dark place that offered a little warmth. The inability to store perishable food meant a reliance on preserved food such as corned-beef and powdered potato for all meals.

The Flowers were nicknamed "the pekingese of the ocean". They had a reputation of having poor sea-handling characteristics, most often rolling in heavy seas, with 80-degree rolls, 40 degrees each side of upright, being fairly common; it was said they "would roll on wet grass". Many crewmen suffered severe motion sickness for a few weeks until they acclimatised to shipboard life. Although poor in their sea-handling characteristics, the Flowers were extremely seaworthy; no Allied sailor was ever lost overboard from a Flower during World War II, outside combat.

A typical action by a Flower encountering a surfaced U-boat during convoy escort duties was to run directly at the submarine, forcing it to dive and thus limiting its speed and manoeuvrability. The corvette would then keep the submarine down and preoccupied with avoiding depth charge attacks long enough to allow the convoy to pass safely. The 16 kn (30 km/h; 18 mph) top speed of the Flower-class ships made effective pursuit of a surfaced U-boat [about 17 kn (31 km/h; 20 mph)] impossible, though it was adequate to manoeuvre around submerged U-boats or convoys, both of which ran at a typical maximum of 8 kn (15 km/h; 9.2 mph) and sometimes much less in poor weather. The low speed also made it difficult for Flowers to catch up with the convoy after action.

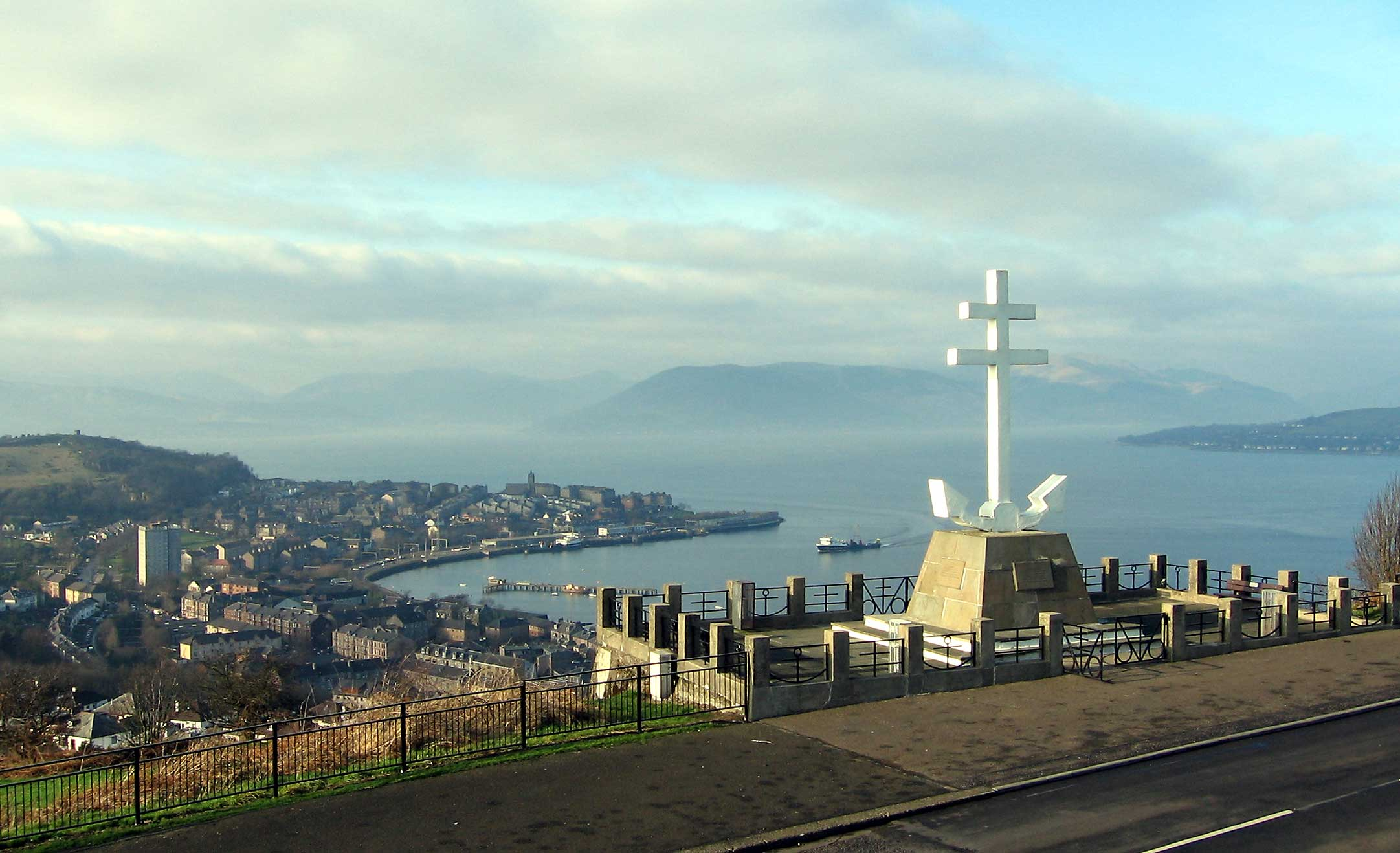
The Free French Memorial on Lyle Hill in Greenock, looking out to the west of the Tail of the Bank anchorage, has a plaque commemorating the loss of the corvettes Alyssa and Mimosa.

This technique was hampered when the Kriegsmarine began deploying its U-boats in "wolf-pack" attacks, which were intended to overwhelm the escort warships of a convoy and allow at least one of the submarines to attack the merchant vessels. Better sensors and armament for the Flowers, such as radar, HF/DF, depth charge projectors and ASDIC, meant these small warships were well equipped to detect and defend against such attacks. The tactical advantage often lay with the attackers, who could mount attacks intended to draw the defending Flower off-station.

Success for the Flowers should be measured in terms of tonnage protected, rather than U-boats sunk. Typical reports of convoy actions by these craft include numerous instances of U-boat detection near a convoy, followed by brief engagements using guns or depth charges and a rapid return to station as another U-boat took advantage of the skirmish to attack the unguarded convoy.

Continuous actions against a numerically superior U-boat pack demanded considerable seamanship skills from all concerned and were very wearing on the crews. Thirty-six ships in the class were lost during World War II, many due to enemy action, some to collision with Allied warships and merchant ships. One, sunk in shallow water, was raised and repaired. Of the vessels lost to enemy action, 22 were torpedoed by U-boats, five were mined and four were sunk by aircraft.

The Flower-class corvettes are credited with participating in the sinking of 47 German and four Italian submarines. Construction of the Flower-class was superseded toward the end of the war as larger shipyards concentrated on River-class frigates and smaller yards on the improved Castle-class corvette design. The Flower class represented fully half of all Allied convoy escort vessels in the North Atlantic during World War II.

== Ships ==
The following tables list all Flower-class corvettes which served in the Allied navies during World War II.

=== Flower-class (original) ===
==== Free French Navy ====
Construction data for Flower-class corvettes of the Free French Navy
Ship	Builder	Laid down	Launched	Commissioned	Paid off	Fate
Aconit	Ailsa Shipbuilding Co. Ltd., Troon	25 March 1940	31 March 1941	23 July 1941	30 April 1947	Formerly HMS Aconite. Transferred on 23 July 1941 to the Free French Navy. Returned to RN on 30 April 1947. Sold and rebuilt as buoy boat (towing vessel) Terje 11 for United Whalers. 1951 converted to a whale catcher. 1960 sold and renamed Southern Terrier. 1963 sold to Norway and 1967 scrapped in Belgium.
Alysse	George Brown & Co., Greenock	24 June 1940	3 March 1941	17 June 1941	9 February 1942	Formerly HMS Alyssum. Transferred on 17 June 1941 to the Free French Navy. Torpedoed and sunk on 9 February 1942 by U-654 while escorting convoy ON-60 about 420 nautical miles (780 km) east of Cape Race at 46-00N, 44-00W. 36 crew were killed.
Commandant d'Estienne d'Orves	Charles Hill & Sons Ltd., Bristol	26 May 1941	17 January 1942	23 May 1942	31 May 1947	Formerly HMS Lotus. Transferred on 23 May 1942 to the Free French Navy upon completion. Returned to RN on 31 May 1947 and sold. Rebuilt as buoy boat Southern Lotus for Christian Salvesen. 1953 converted to a whale catcher. 1966 in tow from Melsomvik to Bruges for scrapping stranded near Hvide Sande on the Jutland coast.
Commandant Detroyat	Hall, Russell & Co., Aberdeen	19 September 1940	9 June 1941	16 September 1941	1947	Formerly HMS Coriander. Transferred on 16 September 1941 to the Free French Navy. Returned to RN in 1947.
Commandant Drogou	Harland & Wolff Ltd., Belfast	17 December 1940	11 April 1941	15 January 1942	May 1947	Formerly HMS Chrysanthemum. Transferred on 26 January 1942 to the Free French Navy. Returned to RN in May 1947 Sold and rebuilt as buoy boat Terje 10 for United Whalers. 1959 sold to Portugal and renamed NRP Carvalho Araújo (A524) and used as survey vessel. 1975 to Angola.
La Bastiaise	Smiths Dock Co., South Bank-on-Tees	18 November 1939	8 April 1940	22 June 1940	22 June 1940	First and only Flower-class corvette commissioned into the French Navy before the Fall of France. Mined during sea trials off Hartlepool on day of her commissioning.
Lobelia	Alexander Hall & Co., Aberdeen	27 June 1940	15 February 1941	16 July 1941	April 1947	Formerly HMS Lobelia. Transferred on 16 July 1941 to the Free French Navy. Returned to RN in April 1947. Sold and rebuilt as whale catcher Thorgeir for A/S Thor Dahl. Continuous upgrading after the catching seasons until 1955. 1955 steam machinery replaced by a Sulzer diesel engine. 1970 scrapped in Norway.
Mimosa	Charles Hill & Sons Ltd., Bristol	22 April 1940	18 January 1941	11 May 1941	9 June 1942	Formerly HMS Mimosa. Transferred on 11 May 1941 to the Free French Navy. Torpedoed and sunk on 9 June 1942 by U-124 while escorting convoy ONS 100 at 52-12N, 32-37W. 58 French and 6 British crew were killed; the French crew being largely from Saint Pierre and Miquelon. 4 survivors rescued by HMCS Assiniboine.
Renoncule	W. Simons & Co., Renfrew	19 July 1940	25 June 1941	28 July 1941	1947	Formerly HMS Ranunculus. Transferred on 28 July 1941 to the Free French Navy. Returned to RN in 1947 and sold. Converted to buoy boat Southern Lily. 1952 rebuilt as whale catcher and used in the Antarctic until 1963. 1967 scrapped in Belgium.
Roselys	J. Lewis & Sons Ltd., Aberdeen	4 November 1940	28 May 1941	19 September 1941	1947	Formerly HMS Sundew. Transferred on 19 September 1941 to the Free French Navy. Returned to RN in 1947.

==== Royal Canadian Navy ====
Construction data for Flower-class corvettes of the Royal Canadian Navy
Ship	Builder	Laid down	Launched	Commissioned	Paid Off	Fate
Agassiz	Burrard Dry Dock Co. Ltd., North Vancouver (city), British Columbia	29 April 1940	15 August 1940	23 January 1941	14 June 1945	Sold on 16 November 1945.
Alberni	Canadian Yarrow, Esquimalt, British Columbia	29 April 1940	22 August 1940	4 February 1941	21 August 1944	Torpedoed and sunk on 21 August 1944 by U-480 while escorting a convoy in the English Channel south of St. Catherine's Point at 50-18N, 00-51W. 59 crew killed and 31 rescued by RN Motor Torpedo Boats.
Algoma	Port Arthur Shipbuilding Co., Port Arthur, Ontario	18 June 1940	17 December 1940	11 July 1941	6 July 1945	Transferred in 1945 to Venezuela as Constitucion.
Amherst	Saint John Dry Dock and Shipbuilding Co. Ltd., Saint John, New Brunswick	23 May 1940	4 December 1940	5 August 1941	16 July 1945	Wrecked in 1945 while under tow.
Arrowhead	Marine Industries Ltd., Sorel-Tracy, Quebec	11 April 1940	8 August 1940	22 November 1940	27 June 1945	Formerly HMS Arrowhead. Transferred to RCN 22 November 1940. Returned to RN 27 June 1945.
Arvida	Morton Engineering & Dry Dock Co., Quebec City	28 February 1940	21 September 1940	22 May 1941	14 June 1945	Sold in 1950 to Spain as mercantile La Ceie.
Baddeck	Davie Shipbuilding & Repairing Co. Ltd., Lauzon, Quebec	14 August 1940	20 November 1940	18 May 1941	4 July 1945	Sold in 1947 as mercantile Efthai.
Barrie	Collingwood Shipbuilding Ltd., Collingwood, Ontario	4 April 1940	23 November 1940	12 May 1941	26 June 1945	Sold in 1947 as mercantile Gasestado.
Battleford	Collingwood Shipbuilding Ltd., Collingwood, Ontario	30 September 1940	15 April 1941	31 July 1941	18 July 1945	Sold in 1946 to Venezuela as Libertad.
Bittersweet	Marine Industries Ltd., Sorel-Tracy	17 April 1940	12 September 1940	23 January 1941	22 June 1945	Formerly HMS Bittersweet. Transferred to RCN 23 January 1941. Returned to RN 22 June 1945.
Brandon	Davie Shipbuilding & Repairing Co. Ltd., Lauzon, Quebec	10 October 1940	29 April 1941	22 July 1941	22 June 1945	Sold on 5 October 1945.
Brantford	Midland Shipyards Ltd., Midland, Ontario	24 February 1941	6 September 1941	15 May 1942	17 August 1945	Converted 1950 to whale catcher Olympic Arrow.
Buctouche	Davie Shipbuilding & Repairing Co. Ltd., Lauzon, Quebec	14 August 1940	20 November 1940	5 June 1941	15 June 1945	Sold on 23 October 1945. Scrapped in 1949 at Hamilton, Ontario.
Calgary	Marine Industries Ltd., Sorel-Tracy	22 March 1941	23 August 1941	16 December 1941	19 June 1945	Sold 30 August 1946. Scrapped 1951 at Hamilton, Ontario.
Camrose	Marine Industries	17 February 1940	16 November 1940	30 June 1941	22 July 1945	Scrapped in Canada.
Chambly	Canadian Vickers Ltd., Montreal	20 February 1940	29 July 1940	18 December 1940	20 June 1945	Sold in 1946. 1954 as Dutch whale catcher Sonia Vinkle (AM20) in service. Scrapped in October 1966 at Santander, Spain.
Charlottetown	Kingston Shipbuilding Co. Ltd., Kingston, Ontario	7 June 1941	10 September 1941	13 December 1941	11 September 1942	Torpedoed and sunk on 11 September 1942 by U-517 off Cap-Chat.
Chicoutimi	Canadian Vickers Ltd., Montreal	5 July 1940	16 October 1940	12 May 1941	16 June 1945	Scrapped in 1946 at Hamilton, Ontario.
Chilliwack	Burrard Dry Dock Co. Ltd., North Vancouver (city)	3 July 1940	14 September 1940	8 April 1941	14 July 1945	Sold on 5 October 1945. Scrapped in 1946 at Hamilton, Ontario.
Cobalt	Port Arthur Shipbuilding Co., Port Arthur, Ontario	1 April 1940	17 August 1940	25 November 1940	17 June 1945	In the Netherlands 1953 as whale catcher Johanna W. Vinke (AM5²) in service. Scrapped 15 December 1961 in South Africa.
Collingwood	Collingwood Shipbuilding Ltd., Collingwood, Ontario	2 March 1940	27 July 1940	9 November 1940	23 July 1945	Scrapped in 1950 at Hamilton, Ontario.
Dauphin	Canadian Vickers Ltd., Montreal	6 July 1940	24 October 1940	17 May 1941	20 June 1945	Sold in 1949 to Honduras as mercantile Cortes.
Dawson	Victoria Machinery Depot Co. Ltd., Victoria, British Columbia	7 September 1940	8 February 1941	6 October 1941	19 June 1945	Scrapped in 1946 at Hamilton, Ontario.
Drumheller	Collingwood Shipbuilding Ltd., Collingwood, Ontario	4 December 1940	5 July 1941	13 September 1941	11 July 1945	Scrapped in 1949 at Hamilton, Ontario.
Dundas	Victoria Machinery Depot Co. Ltd., Victoria, British Columbia	19 March 1941	25 July 1941	1 April 1942	17 July 1945	Sold on 23 October 1945.
Dunvegan	Marine Industries Ltd., Sorel-Tracy	30 August 1940	11 December 1940	9 September 1941	3 July 1945	Sold in 1946 to Venezuela as Independencia. Scrapped in 1953.
Edmundston	Canadian Yarrow, Esquimalt, British Columbia	23 August 1940	22 February 1941	21 October 1941	16 June 1945	Sold in 1948 to Liberia as mercantile Amapala.
Eyebright	Canadian Vickers Ltd., Montreal	20 February 1940	22 July 1940	26 November 1940	17 June 1945	Formerly Eyebright. Transferred to RCN 26 November 1940. Returned to RN 17 June 1945. Became 1950 Dutch whale catcher Albert W. Vinke (AM2²).
Fennel	Marine Industries Ltd., Sorel-Tracy	29 March 1940	20 August 1940	15 May 1941	12 June 1945	Formerly HMS Fennel. Transferred to RCN 15 May 1941. Returned to RN 12 June 1945. 1948 sold to Norway and converted to buoy tender Milliam Khil by Howaldtswerke, Kiel, 1951 conversion to whale catcher in Kiel,1966 scrapped
Fredericton	Marine Industries Ltd., Sorel-Tracy	22 March 1941	2 September 1941	8 December 1941	14 July 1945	Sold in 1946 as mercantile Tra Los Montes. Resold in 1950 as whaler Olympic Fighter and in 1956 as Otori Maru No. 6 and then Kyo Maru No. 20. (Note : the register may actually have mistook it with HMCS Saskatoon.)
Galt	Collingwood Shipbuilding Ltd., Collingwood, Ontario	27 May 1940	28 December 1940	15 May 1941	21 June 1945	Sold on 5 October 1945. Scrapped in 1946 at Hamilton, Ontario.
Halifax	Collingwood Shipbuilding Ltd., Collingwood, Ontario	26 April 1941	4 October 1941	26 November 1941	12 July 1945	Sold in 1945 as mercantile Halifax.
Hepatica	Davie Shipbuilding & Repairing Co. Ltd., Lauzon, Quebec	24 February 1940	6 July 1940	15 May 1941	27 June 1945	Formerly HMS Hepatica. Transferred to RCN 15 May 1941. Returned to RN 27 June 1945.
Kamloops	Victoria Machinery Depot Co. Ltd., Victoria, British Columbia	29 April 1940	7 August 1940	17 March 1941	27 June 1945	Sold on 19 October 1945.
Kamsack	Port Arthur Shipbuilding Co., Port Arthur, Ontario	20 November 1940	5 May 1941	4 October 1941	22 July 1945	Sold in 1945 to Venezuela as Carabobo. Lost in December 1945.
Kenogami	Port Arthur Shipbuilding Co., Port Arthur, Ontario	20 April 1940	5 September 1940	29 June 1941	9 July 1945	Scrapped in January 1950 in Canada.
Kitchener	G T Davie, Lauzon, Quebec	28 February 1941	18 November 1941	28 June 1942	11 July 1945	Formerly Vancouver. Scrapped in September 1949 in Canada.
La Malbaie	Marine Industries Ltd., Sorel-Tracy	22 March 1941	25 October 1941	28 April 1942	28 June 1945	Formerly Fort William. Sold on 17 October 1945.
Lethbridge	Canadian Vickers Ltd., Montreal	5 August 1940	21 November 1940	25 June 1941	23 July 1945	1955 in service as Dutch whale catcher Nicolaas W. Vinke (AM22). Scrapped in September 1966 at Santander, Spain.
Lévis	G T Davie, Lauzon, Quebec	11 March 1940	4 September 1940	16 May 1941	19 September 1941	Torpedoed and sunk 19 September 1941 by U-74 while escorting convoy SC 44 east of Cape Farewell at 60-07N, 38-37W. 18 crew killed and 91 rescued.
Louisburg	Morton Engineering & Dry Dock Co., Quebec City	4 October 1940	27 May 1941	2 October 1941	6 February 1943	Bombed and torpedoed on 6 February 1943 by Luftwaffe aircraft while escorting convoy KMF-8 off Cape Tenes in Mediterranean Sea at 36-15N, 00-15E. 59 crew killed, 50 rescued.
Lunenburg	G T Davie, Lauzon, Quebec	28 September 1940	10 July 1941	4 December 1941	23 July 1945	Scrapped in June 1946 in Canada.
Matapedia	Morton Engineering & Dry Dock Co., Quebec City	2 February 1940	14 September 1940	9 May 1941	16 June 1945	Scrapped in December 1950 in Canada.
Mayflower	Canadian Vickers Ltd., Montreal	20 February 1940	3 July 1940	15 May 1941	31 May 1945	Formerly HMS Mayflower. Transferred to RCN 15 May 1941. Returned to RN 31 May 1945.
Midland	Midland Shipyards Ltd., Midland, Ontario	24 February 1941	25 June 1941	17 November 1941	15 July 1945	Sold on 19 November 1945. Scrapped in 1946 at Fort William, Ontario.
Moncton	Saint John Dry Dock and Shipbuilding Co. Ltd., Saint John, New Brunswick	17 December 1940	11 August 1941	24 April 1942	12 December 1945	Sold in 1955 to the Netherlands as whale catcher Willem Vinke (AM21). Scrapped in 1966 at Santander, Spain.
Moose Jaw	Collingwood Shipbuilding Ltd., Collingwood, Ontario	12 August 1940	9 April 1941	19 June 1941	8 July 1945	Scrapped in September 1949 in Canada.
Morden	Port Arthur Shipbuilding Co., Port Arthur, Ontario	25 October 1940	5 May 1941	6 September 1941	29 June 1945	Scrapped in November 1946 in Canada.
Nanaimo	Canadian Yarrow, Esquimalt, British Columbia	27 April 1940	28 October 1940	26 April 1941	28 September 1945	Sold in 1952 to the Netherlands, became whale catcher René W. Vinke (AM 7²).
Napanee	Kingston Shipbuilding Co. Ltd., Kingston, Ontario	20 March 1940	31 August 1940	12 May 1941	12 July 1945	Scrapped in June 1946 in Canada.
New Westminster	Victoria Machinery Depot Co. Ltd., Victoria, British Columbia	4 February 1941	14 May 1941	31 January 1942	21 June 1945	Sold in 1950 as mercantile Elisa. Resold in 1952 as mercantile Portoviejo and in 1954 as mercantile Azura. Scrapped in 1966 at Tampa, Florida.
Oakville	Port Arthur Shipbuilding Co., Port Arthur, Ontario	21 December 1940	21 June 1941	18 November 1941	20 July 1945	Sold in 1946 to Venezuela as Patria.
Orillia	Collingwood Shipbuilding Ltd., Collingwood, Ontario	4 March 1940	15 September 1940	25 November 1940	2 July 1945	Scrapped in January 1951 in Canada.
Pictou	Davie Shipbuilding & Repairing Co. Ltd., Lauzon, Quebec	12 July 1940	5 October 1940	29 April 1941	12 July 1945	1950 converted to whale catcher Olympic Chaser. Resold in 1956 as Otori Maru No. 7. Converted in 1963 to a barge.
Port Arthur	Port Arthur Shipbuilding Co., Port Arthur, Ontario	28 April 1941	18 September 1941	26 May 1942	11 July 1945	Sold on 23 October 1945. Scrapped in 1948 at Hamilton, Ontario.
Prescott	Kingston Shipbuilding Co. Ltd., Kingston, Ontario	31 August 1940	7 January 1941	26 June 1941	20 July 1945	
Quesnel	Victoria Machinery Depot Co. Ltd., Victoria	9 May 1940	12 November 1940	23 May 1941	3 July 1945	Sold on 5 October 1945. Scrapped in 1946 at Hamilton, Ontario.
Regina	Marine Industries Ltd., Sorel-Tracy	22 March 1941	14 October 1941	22 January 1942	8 August 1944	Torpedoed and sunk on 8 August 1944 by U-667 off Trevose Head at 50-42N, 05-03W. 30 crew were killed.
Rimouski	Davie Shipbuilding & Repairing Co. Ltd., Lauzon, Quebec	12 July 1940	3 October 1940	26 April 1941	24 July 1945	Scrapped in December 1950 in Canada.
Rosthern	Port Arthur Shipbuilding Co., Port Arthur, Ontario	18 June 1940	30 November 1940	17 June 1941	19 July 1945	Scrapped in June 1946 in Canada.
Sackville	Saint John Dry Dock and Shipbuilding Co. Ltd., Saint John, New Brunswick	28 May 1940	15 May 1941	30 December 1941	8 April 1946	Transferred in 1953 to Department of Fisheries as research ship Sackville. Acquired in 1982 by the Canadian Naval Corvette Trust and restored to 1944 configuration. Now a museum ship at the Maritime Museum of the Atlantic in Halifax, operated by the Canadian Naval Memorial Trust. Sackville is the last remaining Flower-class corvette.
Saskatoon	Canadian Vickers Ltd., Montreal	9 August 1940	7 November 1940	9 June 1941	25 June 1945	Sold in 1948 as whaling ship Tra los Montes. Resold in 1950 as mercantile Olympic Fighter, in 1956 as Otori Maru No. 6, and in 1961 as Kyo Maru No. 20 (Note : the register may actually have mistook it with HMCS Fredericton.)
Shawinigan	G T Davie, Lauzon, Quebec	4 June 1940	16 May 1941	19 September 1941	25 November 1944	Torpedoed and sunk with all hands 25 November 1944 by U-1228 in the Cabot Strait at 47-34N, 59-11W.
Shediac	Davie Shipbuilding & Repairing Co. Ltd., Lauzon, Quebec	5 October 1940	29 April 1941	8 July 1941	28 August 1945	Sold in 1952 to the Netherlands, conversion to whale catcher Jooske W. Vinke (AM19). Scrapped in 1966 at Santander, Spain.
Sherbrooke	Marine Industries Ltd., Sorel-Tracy	5 August 1940	25 October 1940	5 June 1941	28 June 1945	Scrapped in May 1947 in Canada.
Snowberry	Davie Shipbuilding & Repairing Co. Ltd., Lauzon, Quebec	24 February 1940	8 August 1940	26 November 1940	8 June 1945	Formerly HMS Snowberry. Transferred to RCN on 26 November 1940. Returned to RN on 8 June 1945.
Sorel	Marine Industries Ltd., Sorel-Tracy	24 August 1940	16 November 1940	19 August 1941	22 June 1945	Sold on 16 November 1945.
Spikenard	Davie Shipbuilding & Repairing Co. Ltd., Lauzon, Quebec	24 February 1940	10 August 1940	15 May 1941	11 February 1942	Formerly HMS Spikenard. Transferred to RCN 15 May 1941. Torpedoed and sunk on 11 February 1942 by U-136 while escorting convoy SC 67 west of Malin Head at 56-10N, 21-07W. 8 crew survived.
Sudbury	Kingston Shipbuilding Co. Ltd., Kingston, Ontario	25 January 1941	31 May 1941	15 October 1941	28 August 1945	Sold in 1949 as mercantile as deep sea salvage tug Sudbury. Scrapped 1967. Refer to the book High Seas, High Risk: The Story of the Sudburys by Pat Norris for details of her career as a salvage tug.
Summerside	Morton Engineering & Dry Dock Co., Quebec City	4 October 1940	7 May 1941	11 September 1941	6 July 1945	Scrapped in June 1946 in Canada.
The Pas	Collingwood Shipbuilding Ltd., Collingwood, Ontario	7 January 1941	16 August 1941	21 October 1941	24 July 1945	Sold on 16 September 1945. Scrapped 1946 at Hamilton, Ontario.
Timmins	Canadian Yarrow, Esquimalt, British Columbia	14 December 1940	26 June 1941	10 February 1942	15 July 1945	Sold in 1948 as mercantile Guayaquil. Lost on 3 August 1960.
Trail	Burrard Dry Dock Co. Ltd., North Vancouver (city)	20 July 1940	16 October 1940	30 April 1941	17 July 1945	Scrapped in August 1950 in Canada.
Trillium	Canadian Vickers Ltd., Montreal	20 February 1940	26 June 1940	31 October 1940	27 June 1945	Formerly HMS Trillium. Transferred to RCN 31 October 1940. Returned to RN 27 June 1945. Converted 1950 to whale catcher Olympic Runner, 1956 resold as Otori Maru No. 10, then Kyo Maru No. 16
Vancouver	Canadian Yarrow, Esquimalt, British Columbia	16 June 1941	26 August 1941	20 March 1942	26 June 1945	Formerly HMCS Kitchener.
Ville de Quebec	Morton Engineering & Dry Dock Co., Quebec City	7 June 1941	12 November 1941	24 May 1942	6 July 1945	Sold in 1946 as mercantile Dispina. Resold in 1947 as mercantile Dorothea Paxos, in 1948 as Tanya, and in 1949 as Medex.
Wetaskiwin	Burrard Dry Dock Co. Ltd., North Vancouver	11 April 1940	18 July 1940	17 December 1940	19 June 1945	Formerly HMCS Banff. Sold in 1946 to Venezuela as Victoria.
Weyburn	Port Arthur Shipbuilding Co., Port Arthur, Ontario	21 December 1940	26 July 1941	26 November 1941	22 February 1943	Mined on 22 February 1943 off Cape Espartel at 36-46N, 06-02W. 7 crew were killed.
Windflower	Davie Shipbuilding & Repairing Co. Ltd., Lauzon, Quebec	25 February 1940	4 July 1940	15 May 1941	7 December 1941	Formerly HMS Windflower. Transferred to RCN 15 May 1941. Sunk 7 December 1941 while escorting convoy SC 58 after collision with freighter Zypenberg in dense fog on the Grand Banks at 46-19N, 49-30W. 23 crew were lost.
Woodstock	Collingwood Shipbuilding Ltd., Collingwood, Ontario	23 May 1941	10 December 1941	1 May 1942	27 January 1945	Converted 1951 to whale catcher Olympic Winner. Resold in 1956 as Otori Maru 20 and in 1957 as Akitsu Maru. Scrapped in 1975 at Etajima.

==== Royal Navy ====
Construction data for Flower-class corvettes of the Royal Navy
Ship	Builder	Laid down	Launched	Commissioned	Paid off	Fate
Abelia	Harland & Wolff Ltd., Belfast	19 August 1940	28 November 1940	3 February 1941		Torpedoed and badly damaged on 9 January 1944 by a U-boat. Sold in 1947. Resold 1948 to Norway, converted in Kiel to buoy tender Kraft, 1951 converted to whale catcher. Resold in 1954 and renamed Arne Skontorp. Scrapped in 1966 in Norway.
Acanthus	Ailsa Shipbuilding Co. Ltd., Troon	21 December 1939	26 May 1941			Transferred on 1 October 1941 before completion to Norway as HNoMS Andenes. 1956 sold and converted to whale catcher Colyn Frye. 1970 scrapped.
Aconite	Ailsa Shipbuilding Co. Ltd., Troon	25 March 1940	31 March 1941	FFL		Transferred on 23 July 1941 to the Free French Navy as Aconit. Returned to RN on 30 April 1947. Sold in July 1947 and rebuilt as whale catcher Terje 11, 1960 Southern Terrier, 1964 laid up and 1966 scrapped
Alisma	Harland & Wolff Ltd., Belfast	19 August 1940	17 December 1940	13 February 1941		Sold in 1947. Resold in 1949 as mercantile Laconia, in 1950 as mercantile Constantinos S, and in 1952 as mercantile Parnon. Sunk 16 July 1954.
Alyssum	George Brown & Co., Greenock	24 June 1940	3 March 1941			Transferred on 17 June 1941 to the Free French Navy as Alysse.
Amaranthus	Fleming & Ferguson Ltd., Paisley	4 May 1940	17 October 1940	12 February 1941		Sold in 1946 as mercantile ship. Scrapped in 1953 at Hong Kong.
Anchusa	Harland & Wolff Ltd., Belfast	17 September 1940	15 January 1941	1 March 1941		Sold in 1946. Resold in 1949 as mercantile Silverlord and in 1954 as mercantile Sir Edgar. Sunk 18 January 1960. Salvaged and scrapped in Mauritius.
Anemone	Blyth Shipbuilding & Drydock Co. Ltd., Blyth, Northumberland	26 October 1939	22 April 1940	12 August 1940		Sold in November 1949. Resold on 3 October 1950 to Norway as buoy tender Pelkan, 1951 rebuilt as whale catcher, sold December 1963, renamed Østfold, Scrapped 1 November 1964.
Arabis	Harland & Wolff Ltd., Belfast	30 October 1939	14 February 1940	5 April 1940	30 April 1942	Transferred on 30 April 1942 to USN as Saucy. Returned to RN 26 August 1945 and renamed HMS Snapdragon. Sold in 1947 as mercantile Katina.
Arbutus	Blyth Shipbuilding & Drydock Co. Ltd., Blyth, Northumberland	30 November 1939	5 June 1940	12 October 1940	5 February 1942	Torpedoed and sunk on 5 February 1942 by U-136 west of Erris Head at 55-05N, 18-43W. Shared sinking of U-70 on 7 March 41. Probable shared sinking of U-47 same day.
Armeria	Harland & Wolff Ltd., Belfast	17 September 1940	16 January 1941	28 March 1941		Sold in 1947. Resold in 1948 as mercantile Deppie, in 1950 as mercantile Canastel, in 1952 as mercantile Rio Blanco and in 1955 as mercantile Lillian.
Arrowhead	Marine Industries Ltd., Sorel-Tracy	11 April 1940	8 August 1940			Transferred on 22 November 1940 before completion to RCN as HMCS Arrowhead. Returned RN 27 June 1945. Sold in May 1947. Resold in 1948 as whale catcher Southern Larkspur. 1953 laid up. Scrapped in November 1959 at Odense.
Asphodel	George Brown & Co., Greenock	20 October 1939	25 May 1940	11 September 1940	10 March 1944	Torpedoed and sunk 10 March 1944 by U-575 while escorting convoys SL 150 and MKS 41 at 45-24N, 18-09W. 92 crew were killed, 5 survivors rescued by HMS Clover.
Aster	Harland & Wolff Ltd., Belfast	15 October 1940	12 February 1941	9 April 1941		Scrapped on 29 May 1946 at Bo'ness.
Aubrietia	George Brown & Co., Greenock	27 October 1939	5 September 1940	23 December 1940		Sold on 29 July 1946. Resold in October 1948 as buoy tender Arnfinn Bergan. Converted in 1951 to whale catcher. 1966 scrapped.
Auricula	George Brown & Co., Greenock	25 November 1939	14 November 1940	5 March 1941	6 May 1942	Mined on 6 May 1942 in Courrier Bay, Madagascar at 12-12S, 49-19E. Foundered the following day while under tow.
Azalea	Cook, Welton & Gemmell, Beverley	15 November 1939	8 July 1940	27 January 1941		Sold on 5 April 1946 as mercantile Norte. Sunk on 19 January 1955.
Balsam	George Brown & Co., Greenock	16 April 1941	30 May 1942	28 November 1942		Formerly Chelmer. Scrapped on 20 April 1947 at Newport.
Begonia	Cook, Welton & Gemmell, Beverley	13 March 1940	18 September 1940	3 March 1941	10 March 1942	Transferred on 10 March 1942 to USN as USS Impulse. Returned to RN on 22 August 1945. Sold on 22 July 1946 as mercantile Begonlock. Resold in 1949 as mercantile Fundiciones Molinao, in 1951as mercantile Astiluzu and in 1956 as mercantile Rio Mero.
Bellwort	George Brown & Co., Greenock	17 September 1940	11 August 1941	20 November 1941		Sold to Ireland and handed over on 3 February 1947 to the Irish Naval Service as the LÉ Cliona, pennant number 03. Commissioned on the same date. Taken out of service July 1969, she was decommissioned on 2 November 1970 and shortly afterwards was scrapped at Passage West, Cork Harbour.
Bergamot	Harland & Wolff Ltd., Belfast	15 October 1940	15 February 1941	12 May 1941		Sold in May 1946 as mercantile ship. Resold in 1947 as mercantile Syros, in 1951 as mercantile Delphini and in 1955 as mercantile Ekaterini.
Bittersweet	Marine Industries Ltd., Sorel-Tracy	17 April 1940	12 September 1940			Transferred on 23 January 1941 before completion to RCN as HMCS Bittersweet on 23 January 1941. Returned to RN on 22 June 1945. Scrapped in November 1950.
Bluebell	Fleming & Ferguson Ltd., Paisley	25 October 1939	24 April 1940	19 July 1940	17 February 1945	Torpedoed and sunk on 17 February 1945 by U-711 off the Kola Inlet at 69-36N, 35-29E.
Borage	George Brown & Co., Greenock	27 November 1940	22 November 1941	29 April 1942		Sold to Ireland and handed over on the 15 November 1946 to the Irish Naval Service and commissioned the same day as LÉ Macha. Pennant Number 01. Originally built as a Flotilla Commander with extra accommodation and a 3/4 deck. Taken out of service in December 1968 and decommissioned on 2 November 1970, sold for scrap on 22 November 1970. Scrapped at Passage West, Cork Harbour.
Bryony	Harland & Wolff Ltd., Belfast	16 November 1940	15 March 1941	4 June 1942		Bombed and sunk by the Luftwaffe on 15 April 1941 during sea trials. Raised and repaired. Transferred to the Royal Norwegian Navy in 1947, in service as weathership HNoMS Polarfront.
Burdock	John Crown & Sons Ltd., Sunderland	13 June 1940	14 December 1940	27 March 1941		Sold in June 1946. Scrapped in August 1946 at Hayle.
Buttercup	Harland & Wolff Ltd., Belfast	17 December 1940	10 April 1941	24 April 1942	20 December 1944	Served from 23 April 1942 to 20 December 1944 in the Royal Navy Section Belge, crewed with Belgian volunteers. Transferred on 20 December 1944 to Royal Norwegian Navy as HNoMS Buttercup. Bought in 1946 by Norway and renamed HNoMS Nordkyn. 1956 sold and converted to diesel-driven whale catcher Thoris. 1969 scrapped.
Calendula	Harland & Wolff Ltd., Belfast	30 October 1939	21 March 1940	6 May 1940	12 March 1942	Transferred on 12 March 1942 to USN as USS Ready. Returned to RN on 23 August 1945. Sold on 22 July 1946. Resold in 1948 as mercantile Villa Cisneros and in 1949 as mercantile Villa Bens.
Camellia	Harland & Wolff Ltd., Belfast	14 November 1939	4 May 1940	18 June 1940		Shared sinking of U-70 7 March 1941. Probable shared sinking of U-47 same day. Sold on 9 August 1946. Resold in 1948 as whale catcher Hetty W. Vinkle (AM9).
Campanula	Fleming & Ferguson Ltd., Paisley	26 October 1939	23 May 1940	6 September 1940		Scrapped on 21 August 1947 at Dunston. Nicholas Monsarrat served aboard as officer.
Campion	John Crown & Sons Ltd., Sunderland	16 September 1940	20 June 1941	7 July 1941		Sold on 20 April 1947 and scrapped at Newport.
Candytuft	Grangemouth Dry Dock Co., Grangemouth	31 October 1939	8 July 1940	16 October 1940	4 March 1942	Transferred on 4 March 1942 to USN as USS Tenacity. Returned to RN on 26 August 1945. Sold on 9 July 1946. Resold in 1947 as mercantile Maw Hwa.
Carnation	Grangemouth Dry Dock Co., Grangemouth	26 February 1940	3 September 1940	22 February 1941		Transferred on 26 March 1943 to the Royal Netherlands Navy as HNLMS Frisco. Returned to RN on 4 October 1944. Sold on 31 March 1948 as mercantile ship. Resold in 1949, became whale catcher Southern Laurel. Scrapped in 1966 at Stavanger.
Celandine	Grangemouth Dry Dock Co., Grangemouth	30 April 1940	28 December 1940	30 April 1941		Shared sinking of U-556 27 June 41. Sold in October 1948 and scrapped at Portaferry.
Chrysanthemum	Harland & Wolff Ltd., Belfast	17 December 1940	11 April 1941			Transferred on 26 January 1942 to the Free French Navy as Commandant Drogou. Returned to RN in May 1947. Sold on 7 August 1947. Resold in 1948 as mercantile Terje 10. Resold on 23 May 1959 to Portugal as hydrographic survey vessel NRP Carvalho Araújo (A524) until 3 September 1975 when she was transferred to the Angolan Navy.
Clarkia	Harland & Wolff Ltd., Belfast	30 October 1939	7 March 1940	22 April 1940		Sold on 30 July 1947 for scrap.
Clematis	Charles Hill & Sons Ltd., Bristol	11 October 1939	22 April 1940	27 July 1940		Scrapped in September 1949 at Charlestown.
Clover	Fleming & Ferguson Ltd., Paisley	29 July 1940	30 January 1941	13 May 1941		Sold on 17 May 1947 as mercantile Cloverlock. Resold to People's Republic of China as mercantile Kai Feng.
Coltsfoot	Alexander Hall & Co., Aberdeen	4 September 1940	15 May 1941	1 November 1941		Sold in 1947 as mercantile Alexandra.
Columbine	Charles Hill & Sons Ltd., Bristol	2 November 1939	13 August 1940	9 November 1940		Sold on 9 August 1946. Resold and renamed Leif Welding in 1949, used as buoy tender, then whale catcher. Scrapped in 1966 at Grimstad.
Convolvulus	Charles Hill & Sons Ltd., Bristol	17 January 1940	22 September 1940	26 February 1941		Sold on 21 August 1947 and scrapped on 5 October 1947 at Newport.
Coreopsis	A. & J. Inglis Ltd., Glasgow	19 September 1939	23 May 1940	17 August 1940	10 November 1943	Transferred on 10 November 1943 to the Royal Hellenic Navy as Kriezis. Returned to RN on 1 June 1952. Portrayed the fictional HMS Compass Rose (K49) in the 1953 film The Cruel Sea. Scrapped on 22 July 1952 at Sunderland.
Coriander	Hall, Russell & Co., Aberdeen	19 September 1940	9 June 1941			Transferred on 16 September 1941 to the Free French Navy as Commandant Detroyant. Returned to RN in 1947. Scrapped in 1948 at Troon.
Cowslip	Harland & Wolff Ltd., Belfast	16 January 1941	28 May 1941	9 August 1941		Sold in July 1948. Scrapped in April 1949 at Troon.
Crocus	A. & J. Inglis Ltd., Glasgow	26 October 1939	26 June 1940	20 October 1940		Badly damaged U-333 by ramming her twice 6 October 1942. Sold on 22 July 1946 as mercantile Annlock. Scrapped in 1952 at Hong Kong.
Cyclamen	J. Lewis & Sons Ltd., Aberdeen	30 November 1939	20 June 1940	30 September 1940		Sold in 1947. Resold in 1948, became whale catcher Southern Briar. Wrecked 1966 at Thorsminde while under tow for demolition in Belgium.
Dahlia	J. Lewis & Sons Ltd., Aberdeen	28 February 1940	31 October 1940	21 March 1941		Scrapped on 28 October 1948 at Gelliswick Bay.
Delphinium	Henry Robb Ltd., Leith	31 October 1939	6 June 1940	15 November 1940		Scrapped in February 1949 at Pembroke Dock.
Dianella	J. Lewis & Sons Ltd., Aberdeen	8 December 1939	3 September 1940	6 January 1941		Formerly Daffodil. Scrapped on 24 June 1947 at Portaferry.
Dianthus	Henry Robb Ltd., Leith	31 October 1939	9 July 1940	17 March 1941		Sank U-379 single-handed by both ramming and depth-charging enemy 8 August 42. Sold in May 1947 as mercantile ship. Resold in June 1949 to Norway as buoy tender Thorslep. Rebuilt in 1950 to whale catcher. Scrapped in June 1969 at Grimstad.
Eglantine	Harland & Wolff Ltd., Belfast	16 January 1941	11 June 1941			Transferred on 29 August 1941 to Royal Norwegian Navy as Eglantine. Sold to Norway on 10 August 1946 as fishery protection service Soroy.
Erica	Harland & Wolff Ltd., Belfast	22 February 1940	18 June 1940	9 August 1940	9 February 1943	Mined and sunk on 9 February 1943 while escorting a convoy in the Mediterranean Sea off Derna, Libya at 32-48N, 21-10E. Entire crew rescued by HMSAS Southern Maid.
Eyebright	Canadian Vickers Ltd., Montreal	20 February 1940	22 July 1940			Transferred on 26 November 1940 before completion to RCN as HMCS Eyebright. Returned to RN on 17 June 1945. Sold on 17 May 1947. Resold in 1950 to the Netherlands as mercantile Albert W. Vinke. Scrapped in 1965 at Cape Town.
Fennel	Marine Industries Ltd., Sorel-Tracy	29 March 1940	20 August 1940			Transferred on 15 May 1941 before completion to RCN as HMCS Fennel. Shared sinking of U-744 6 March 44. Returned to RN on 12 June 1945. Sold 1948 to Norway as Milliam Kihl. Converted October 1948 as buoy tender, then 1951 in West Germany to whale catcher. Laid up 1960–61. Last whaling season 1964–65. Scrapped in 1966 at Grimstad.
Fleur de Lys	Smiths Dock Co., South Bank-on-Tees	30 January 1940	21 June 1940	26 August 1940	14 October 1941	Launched as La Dieppoise for the French Navy. Completed for RN after the Fall of France. Torpedoed and sunk by U-206 west of Gibraltar at 36-00N, 06-30W. There were 3 survivors.
Freesia	Harland & Wolff Ltd., Belfast	18 June 1940	3 October 1940	19 November 1940		Sold on 22 July 1946 as mercantile Freelock. Sunk on 1 April 1947.
Fritillary	Harland & Wolff Ltd., Belfast	15 February 1941	22 July 1941	1 November 1941		Sold on 19 March 1946. Resold in 1947 as mercantile Andria and in 1949 as mercantile V.D. Chidambaram. Scrapped in 1955 in India.
Gardenia	W. Simons & Co., Renfrew	20 September 1939	10 April 1940	24 May 1940	9 November 1942	Rammed and sunk off Oran at 35-49N, 01-05W in collision with HMS Fluellen.
Genista	Harland & Wolff Ltd., Belfast	15 February 1941	24 July 1941	8 December 1941		Sold in 1947 as weather ship Weather Recorder. Scrapped in 1961.
Gentian	Harland & Wolff Ltd., Belfast	20 April 1940	6 August 1940	20 September 1940		Scrapped on 21 August 1947 at Purfleet.
Geranium	W. Simons & Co., Renfrew	21 September 1939	10 April 1940	24 June 1940		Shared sinking of U-306 31 October 43. Transferred on 8 September 1945 to Royal Danish Navy as Thetis.
Gladiolus	Smiths Dock Co., South Bank-on-Tees	19 October 1939	24 January 1940	6 April 1940	17 October 1941	Torpedoed and sunk on 17 October 1941 by U-553 while escorting convoy SC 48 south of Iceland at 57-00N, 25-00W. All hands were lost. Shared sinkings of U-26 1 July 40 and U-556 27 June 41.
Gloriosa	Harland & Wolff Ltd., Belfast					Cancelled on 23 January 1941. Pennant number K201
Gloxinia	Harland & Wolff Ltd., Belfast	21 March 1940	2 July 1940	22 August 1940		Scrapped on 15 July 1947 at Purfleet.
Godetia	Smiths Dock Co., South Bank-on-Tees	4 January 1940	8 May 1940	15 July 1940	6 September 1940	Rammed and sunk 3 miles (4.8 km) off Altacarry Head at 55-18N, 05-57W in collision with mercantile Marsa.
Godetia	John Crown & Sons Ltd., Sunderland	15 January 1941	24 September 1941	23 February 1942		Formerly Dart. Served from 12 February 1942 to 16 Dezember 1944 in the Royal Navy Section Belge, crewed with Belgian volunteers. Sold on 22 May 1947 and scrapped at Grays.
Harebell	Harland & Wolff Ltd., Belfast					Cancelled on 23 January 1941. Pennant K202
Heartsease	Harland & Wolff Ltd., Belfast	14 November 1939	20 April 1940	4 June 1940	3 April 1942	Transferred on 3 April 1942 to USN as Courage. Returned to RN on 23 August 1945. Sold on 22 July 1946. Resold in 1951 as mercantile Roskva, in 1956 as mercantile Douglas, and in 1958 as mercantile Seabird. Lost in December 1958.
Heather	Harland & Wolff Ltd., Belfast	22 May 1940	17 September 1940	1 November 1940		Sold on 22 May 1947 and scrapped at Grays.
Heliotrope	John Crown & Sons Ltd., Sunderland	23 October 1939	5 June 1940	12 September 1940	24 March 1942	Transferred on 24 March 1942 to USN as Surprise. Returned to RN on 26 August 1945. Sold as mercantile ship. Finally served in People's Liberation Army Navy as Lin I.
Hemlock	Harland & Wolff Ltd., Belfast					Cancelled on 23 January 1941.
Hepatica	Davie Shipbuilding & Repairing Co. Ltd., Lauzon, Quebec	24 February 1940	6 July 1940			Transferred on 15 May 1941 before completion to RCN as HMCS Hepatica. Returned to RN on 27 June 1945. Scrapped on 1 January 1948 at Llanelly.
Hibiscus	Harland & Wolff Ltd., Belfast	14 November 1939	6 April 1940	21 May 1940	2 May 1942	Transferred on 2 May 1942 to USN as Spry. Returned to RN on 26 August 1945. Sold as mercantile Madonna. Scrapped in 1955 at Hong Kong.
Hollyhock	John Crown & Sons Ltd., Sunderland	27 November 1939	19 August 1940	19 November 1940	9 April 1942	Bombed and sunk on 9 April 1942 by Japanese aircraft east of Ceylon at 07-21N, 81-57E.
Honeysuckle	Ferguson Bros. (Port Glasgow) Ltd., Port Glasgow	26 October 1939	22 April 1940	14 September 1940		Sold in 1950 and scrapped in November 1950 at Grays.
Hyacinth	Harland & Wolff Ltd., Belfast	20 April 1940	19 August 1940	3 October 1940	24 October 1943	Shared sinking of U-617 by gunfire after enemy ran aground 12 September 43. Transferred on 24 October 1943 to Royal Hellenic Navy as Apostolis. Returned to RN in 1952.
Hyderabad	Alexander Hall & Co., Aberdeen	24 December 1940	23 September 1941	23 February 1942		Formerly Nettle. Shared sinking of U-436 26 May 43. Sold on 1 January 1948 and scrapped in October 1948 at Portaferry.
Hydrangea	Ferguson Bros. (Port Glasgow) Ltd., Port Glasgow	22 November 1939	4 September 1940	3 January 1941		Shared sinking of U-401 3 August 41. Sold in 1947. Resold in 1948 as mercantile Hydralock. Wrecked on 25 February 1957 off Taiwan.
Ivy	Harland & Wolff Ltd., Belfast					Cancelled on 23 January 1941. Pennant number K204.
Jasmine	Ferguson Bros. (Port Glasgow) Ltd., Port Glasgow	23 December 1939	14 January 1941	16 May 1941		Sold on 11 September 1948 for scrap.
Jonquil	Fleming & Ferguson Ltd., Paisley	27 December 1939	9 July 1940	21 October 1940		Sold in May 1946. Resold in 1947 as mercantile Lemnos. Resold in 1951 as Olympic Rider. Whale catcher sank in Antarctic waters on 1 December 1955 after collision with Olympic Cruiser.
Kingcup	Harland & Wolff Ltd., Belfast	19 July 1940	31 October 1940	30 December 1940		Sold on 31 July 1946. Resold in 1947 as mercantile Rubis and in 1954 as mercantile Seislim. Scrapped in 1959 at Hendrik-Ido-Ambacht.
La Malouine	Smiths Dock Co., South Bank-on-Tees	13 November 1939	21 March 1940	29 July 1940		Launched and commissioned as La Malouine for the French Navy. Seized by and completed for RN after the Fall of France (name not changed). Scrapped on 22 May 1947 at Gelliswick Bay.
Larkspur	Fleming & Ferguson Ltd., Paisley	26 March 1940	5 September 1940	4 January 1941	17 March 1942	Transferred on 17 March 1942 to USN as Fury. Returned to RN on 22 August 1945. Sold on 22 July 1946 as mercantile Larkslock. Scrapped in 1953 at Hong Kong.
Lavender	Alexander Hall & Co., Aberdeen	30 April 1940	27 November 1940	16 May 1941		Sold on 9 August 1946. Resold 1948 to the Netherlands and converted to whale catcher Eugene Vinke (AM10)
Ling	Harland & Wolff Ltd., Belfast					Cancelled on 23 January 1941.
Lobelia	Alexander Hall & Co., Aberdeen	27 June 1940	15 February 1941			Transferred on 16 July 1941 to the Free French Navy as Lobelia (name not changed). Sank U-609 single-handed 7 February 43. Returned to RN in April 1947. Sold on 3 May 1947 to Norway as mercantile ship. Resold in July 1948 as buoy tender Thorgeir. Rebuilt as whale catcher, since 1955 diesel-engined. Scrapped in 1969 at Grimstad.
Loosestrife	Hall, Russell & Co., Aberdeen	9 December 1940	25 August 1941	25 November 1941		Sold on 4 October 1946. Resold in 1947 as mercantile Kallsevni.
Lotus	Charles Hill & Sons Ltd., Bristol	26 May 1941	17 January 1942	23 May 1942		Transferred on 23 May 1942 to the Free French Navy as Commandant d'Estienne d'Orves. Returned to RN on 31 May 1947. Sold 23 October 1947. BU May 1951.
Mallow	Harland & Wolff Ltd., Belfast	14 November 1939	22 May 1940	2 July 1940	11 January 1944	Shared sinking of U-204 19 October 41. Transferred on 11 January 1944 to the Yugoslav Navy as Nada. Renamed in 1948 as Partizanka. Returned to RN in 1948. Transferred in 1948 to the Egyptian Navy as El Sudan.
Marguerite	Hall, Russell & Co., Aberdeen	30 December 1939	8 July 1940	20 November 1940		Sold in 1947 as a weather ship becoming Ocean Weather Ship (OWS) Weather Observer. Scrapped on 8 September 1961 at Ghent.
Marigold	Hall, Russell & Co., Aberdeen	26 January 1940	4 September 1940	28 February 1941	9 December 1942	Torpedoed and sunk on 9 December 1942 by the Aviazione Ausiliara per la Marina while escorting convoy KMS.3Y off Algiers at 36-50N, 03-00E. 40 crew were killed.
Marjoram	Harland & Wolff Ltd., Belfast					Cancelled on 23 January 1941. Pennant number K206
Mayflower	Canadian Vickers Ltd., Montreal	20 February 1940	3 July 1940			Transferred on 15 May 1941 before completion to RCN as Mayflower. Returned to RN on 31 May 1945. Scrapped on 20 September 1949 at Inverkeithing.
Meadowsweet	Charles Hill & Sons Ltd., Bristol	12 August 1941	28 March 1942	8 July 1942		Sold on 31 March 1951 to the Netherlands for conversion as whale catcher Gerrit W. Vinkle (AM 1²).
Mignonette	Hall, Russell & Co., Aberdeen	15 July 1940	28 January 1941	7 May 1941		Shared sinkings of U-135 15 July 43 and U-1199 21 April 45. Sold in 1946. Resold in 1948 as mercantile Alexandrouplis. Sunk on 30 November 1948.
Mimosa	Charles Hill & Sons Ltd., Bristol	22 April 1940	18 January 1941			Transferred on 11 May 1941 to the Free French Navy as Mimosa (name not changed).
Monkshood	Fleming & Ferguson Ltd., Paisley	1 October 1940	17 April 1941	31 July 1941		Sold in 1947. Resold in 1948 as buoy tender W.R. Strang. Converted to whale catcher. Resold in 1957 as Toshi Maru. Scrapped in Japan in 1965.
Montbretia	Fleming & Ferguson Ltd., Paisley	16 November 1940	27 May 1941			Transferred on 29 September 1941 to Royal Norwegian Navy as HNoMS Montbretia.
Myosotis	J. Lewis & Sons Ltd., Aberdeen	21 June 1940	28 January 1941	30 May 1941		Sold on 2 September 1946 to Faroe Islands as trawler Grunningur. Resold in 1949 as buoy tender, then diesel-engined whale catcher Thorørn. Scrapped in 1969 at Grimstad.
Narcissus	J. Lewis & Sons Ltd., Aberdeen	9 September 1940	29 March 1941	17 July 1941		Sold in April 1946 as mercantile Este.
Nasturtium	Smiths Dock Co., South Bank-on-Tees	23 March 1940	4 July 1940	26 September 1940		Launched as La Paimpolaise for the French Navy. Completed for RN after the Fall of France. Shared sinking of U-556 27 June 1941. Sold in 1946.
Nigella	George Philip & Son Ltd., Dartmouth, Devon	28 November 1939	21 September 1940	25 February 1941		Sold in 1947 as mercantile Nigelock. Sunk on 10 March 1955.
Orchis	Harland & Wolff Ltd., Belfast	18 June 1940	15 October 1940	29 November 1940	21 August 1944	Sank U-741 single-handed 15 August 44. Mined and heavily damaged on 21 August 1944 off Courseulles-sur-Mer. Beached on Juno Beach and declared a total loss.
Oxlip	A. & J. Inglis Ltd., Glasgow	9 December 1940	28 August 1941	28 December 1941		Sold to Ireland. Handed over on the 20 December 1946 to the Irish Naval Service as the LÉ Maeve, pennant number 02. Commissioned the same day. By late 1970 she was unfit to put to sea and was decommissioned in 1971. She was sold for scrapping on 23 March 1972 and removed to Passage West, Cork Harbour the following day.
Pennywort	A. & J. Inglis Ltd., Glasgow	11 March 1941	18 October 1941	5 March 1942		Sold in 1947. Scrapped in February 1949 at Troon.
Pentstemon	George Philip & Son Ltd., Dartmouth, Devon	28 November 1939	18 January 1941	31 July 1941		Sold in 1946. Resold in 1947 as mercantile Galaxidi and in 1951 as mercantile Rosa Vlassi.
Peony	Harland & Wolff Ltd., Belfast	24 February 1940	4 June 1940	2 August 1940	1943	Transferred in 1943 to the Royal Hellenic Navy as Sachtouris. Returned to RN in September 1951. Scrapped on 21 April 1952.
Periwinkle	Harland & Wolff Ltd., Belfast	30 October 1939	24 February 1940	8 April 1940	15 March 1942	Shared sinking of U-147 2 June 1941. Transferred on 15 March 1942 to USN as USS Restless. Returned to RN on 26 August 1945. Sold in 1947 as mercantile Perilock. Scrapped in 1953 at Hong Kong.
Petunia	Henry Robb Ltd., Leith	4 December 1939	19 September 1940	13 January 1941		Sold in January 1946 to the Republic of China Navy as Fu Po. Sunk on 19 March 1947.
Phlox	Henry Robb Ltd., Leith	?	16 January 1942	May 1942		Renamed Lotus (ii) April 1942 after transfer of Lotus (i) to France. Sold in 1947/January 1948 as mercantile Southern Lotus. Refitted in 1948 as a buoy tender. Refitted in 1950 as a whaling ship. Sold in December 1966 for scrapping in Belgium. Wrecked 18 December 1966 off Jutland, Denmark, while being towed from Norway to Belgium for scrapping together with her sister Southern Briar (ex-HMS Cyclamen).
Picotee	Harland & Wolff Ltd., Belfast	21 March 1940	19 July 1940	5 September 1940	12 August 1941	Torpedoed and sunk on 12 August 1941 by U-568 while escorting convoy ONS 4 south of Iceland at 62-00N, 16-01W. All hands were lost.
Pimpernel	Harland & Wolff Ltd., Belfast	19 July 1940	16 November 1940	9 January 1941		Sold on 6 February 1948. Scrapped in October 1948 at Portaferry.
Pink	Henry Robb Ltd., Leith	20 May 1941	16 February 1942	2 July 1942	27 June 1944	Torpedoed and heavily damaged on 27 June 1944 by U-988 off Normandy at 49-48N, 00-49W. Declared a total loss and scrapped in 1947 at Llanelly.
Polyanthus	Henry Robb Ltd., Leith	19 March 1940	30 November 1940	24 April 1941	21 September 1943	Torpedoed and sunk on 21 September 1943 by U-952 while escorting convoy ON 202 at 57-00N, 31-10W. 1 survivor rescued by Itchen but was killed when Itchen was torpedoed and sunk by U-666 on 23 September 1943.
Poppy	Alexander Hall & Co., Aberdeen	6 March 1941	20 November 1941	12 May 1942		Sold in 1946 as mercantile Rami. Scrapped in 1956.
Potentilla	W. Simons & Co., Renfrew	28 February 1941	18 December 1941			Transferred on 16 January 1942 to the Royal Norwegian Navy as Potentilla. Returned to RN on 13 March 1944. Sold on 13 March 1946 and scrapped at Gateshead.
Primrose	W. Simons & Co., Renfrew	22 September 1939	8 May 1940	15 July 1940		Sold on 9 August 1946. Resold in June 1949 as buoy tender Mek V. Resold in 1952 as whaling ship Norfinn. Sold in October 1965. Scrapped in June 1966 in Belgium.
Primula	W. Simons & Co., Renfrew	23 September 1939	22 June 1940	27 August 1940		Sold on 22 July 1946. Resold in 1947 as mercantile Marylock. Scrapped in 1953 at Hong Kong.
Ranunculus	W. Simons & Co., Renfrew	19 July 1940	25 June 1941			Transferred on 28 July 1941 to the Free French Navy as Renoncule. Returned to RN in 1947. Sold in 1947 as buoy tender, later whale catcher Southern Lily. 1963 Laid up. Scrapped on 9 January 1967 at Bruges.
Rhododendron	Harland & Wolff Ltd., Belfast	22 May 1940	2 September 1940	18 October 1940		Sold on 17 May 1947. Resold 1950 to the Netherlands and converted to whale catcher Maj Vinke (AM15)
Rockrose	Charles Hill & Sons Ltd., Bristol	28 October 1940	26 July 1941	4 November 1941		Transferred on 4 October 1947 to the South African Navy as HMSAS Protea. Became hydrographic vessel in 1949
Rose	W. Simons & Co., Renfrew	3 September 1940	22 September 1941			Transferred on 31 October 1941 to the Royal Norwegian Navy as Rose.
Salvia	W. Simons & Co., Renfrew	26 September 1939	6 August 1940	20 September 1940	24 December 1941	Torpedoed and sunk on 24 December 1941 by U-568 west of Alexandria at 31-46N, 28-00E. All hands were lost plus a number of the crew, servicemen and POW's rescued from the loss of SS Shuntien torpedoed and sunk by U-559 on 23 December 1941
Samphire	Smiths Dock Co., South Bank-on-Tees	4 December 1940	14 April 1941	30 June 1941	30 January 1943	Shared sinking of U-567 21 December 41. Torpedoed and sunk on 30 January 1943 by Italian submarine Platino while escorting convoy TE-14 off Béjaïa at 36-56N, 05-40E.
Saxifrage	Charles Hill & Sons Ltd., Bristol	1 February 1941	24 October 1941	6 February 1942		Transferred in August 1947 to Royal Norwegian Navy as Polarfront I.
Snapdragon	Smiths Dock Co., South Bank-on-Tees	27 September 1939	3 September 1940	28 October 1940	19 December 1942	Bombed and sunk on 19 December 1942 by the Luftwaffe northwest of Benghazi at 32-18N, 19-54E.
Snowberry	Davie Shipbuilding & Repairing Co. Ltd., Lauzon, Quebec	24 February 1940	8 August 1940			Transferred on 26 November 1940 before completion to RCN as Snowberry. Shared sinking of U-536 20 November 43. Returned to RN on 8 June 1945. Scrapped in August 1947 at Middlesbrough.
Snowdrop	Smiths Dock Co., South Bank-on-Tees	4 February 1941	12 May 1941	30 July 1941		Sold on 17 May 1947. Scrapped in September 1949 at Newcastle upon Tyne.
Snowflake	Smiths Dock Co., South Bank-on-Tees	19 May 1941	22 August 1941	2 November 1941		Formerly Zenobia. Shared sinking of U-125 3 July 43 by gunfire. Sold in 1947 as weather ship Weather Watcher. Scrapped in May 1962 at Dublin.
Spikenard	Davie Shipbuilding & Repairing Co. Ltd., Lauzon, Quebec	24 February 1940	10 August 1940			Transferred on 15 May 1941 before completion to RCN as Spikenard.
Spiraea	A. & J. Inglis Ltd., Glasgow	31 May 1940	31 October 1940	27 February 1941		Sold in August 1947. Resold in 1948 as mercantile Thessalonika.
Starwort	A. & J. Inglis Ltd., Glasgow	11 June 1940	12 February 1941	26 May 1941		Shared sinking of U-660 12 November 42 (scuttled). Sold in 1948, converted to whale catcher Southern Broom. 1963 laid up. Scrapped on 9 January 1967 at Bruges.
Stonecrop	Smiths Dock Co., South Bank-on-Tees	4 February 1941	12 May 1941	30 July 1941		Shared sinking of U-124 2 April 43. Shared sinking of U-634 30 August 43. Sold on 17 May 1947. Resold in 1949 as mercantile Silver King. 1952 in Dutch service as whale catcher Martha W. Vinke (AM 6²).
Sundew	J. Lewis & Sons Ltd., Aberdeen	4 November 1940	28 May 1941			Transferred on 19 September 1941 to the Free French Navy as Roselys. Returned to RN in 1947. Sold on 23 October 1947 and scrapped in May 1948 at Troon.
Sunflower	Smiths Dock Co., South Bank-on-Tees	24 May 1940	19 August 1940	25 January 1941		The most successful Royal Navy Flower-class. Shared sinking of U-282 29 October 43. Sank single-handed 2 U-boats: U-631 17 October 43 and U-638 5 May 43. Scrapped in August 1947 at Hayle.
Sweetbriar	Smiths Dock Co., South Bank-on-Tees	4 April 1941	26 June 1941	8 September 1941		Sold on 29 July 1946. Resold in June 1949 as whale catcher Star IX. Scrapped in April 1966 at Bruges.
Tamarisk	Fleming & Ferguson Ltd., Paisley	10 February 1941	28 July 1941	26 December 1941	November 1943	Formerly Ettrick, renamed before completion. Shared sinking of U-82 6 February 42. Transferred in November 1943 to Royal Hellenic Navy as Tombazis. Returned to RN in 1952. Scrapped on 20 March 1952 in the United Kingdom.
Thyme	Smiths Dock Co., South Bank-on-Tees	30 April 1941	25 July 1941	23 October 1941		Sold in 1947 as weather ship Weather Explorer. Resold in 1958 as mercantile Epos and scrapped in Hong Kong in 1962.
Trillium	Canadian Vickers Ltd., Montreal	20 February 1940	26 June 1940			Transferred on 31 October 1940 before completion to RCN as HMCS Trillium. Returned to RN on 25 June 1945. Sold in 1950 as whale catcher Olympic Runner. Resold in 1956 as Otori Maru 10, then in 1959 as Kyo Maru No. 16.
Tulip	Smiths Dock Co., South Bank-on-Tees	30 May 1940	4 September 1940	18 November 1940		Sold in May 1947. Resold in 1950 as whale catcher Olympic Conqueror. Confiscated November 1954 by Peru. In 1956 sold to Japan as Otori Maru No. 8. Resold in 1957 as Thorlyn and in November 1964 to Sweden. Scrapped in 1965 in West Germany.
Verbena	Smiths Dock Co., South Bank-on-Tees	29 June 1940	1 October 1940	19 December 1940		Sold on 17 May 1947. Scrapped on 1 October 1951 at Blyth, Northumberland.
Veronica	Smiths Dock Co., South Bank-on-Tees	9 July 1940	17 October 1940	18 February 1941	16 February 1942	Transferred on 16 February 1942 to USN as Temptress. Returned to RN on 26 August 1945. Sold in 1946 as mercantile Verolock. Sank in 1947. Raised in 1951 and scrapped at Blyth, Northumberland.
Vervain	Harland & Wolff Ltd., Belfast	16 November 1940	12 March 1941	9 June 1941	20 February 1945	Formerly Broom. Torpedoed and sunk on 20 February 1945 by U-1276 southeast of Dungarvan at 51-47N, 07-06W.
Vetch	Smiths Dock Co., South Bank-on-Tees	15 March 1941	27 May 1941	11 August 1941		Shared sinking of U-252 14 April 42. Sank U-414 single-handed 25 May 43. Sold in August 1945. Resold in 1948 as mercantile Patrai, in 1951 as whale catcher Olympic Hunter and in 1956 as Otori Maru No. 18.
Violet	W. Simons & Co., Renfrew	21 March 1940	30 December 1940	3 February 1941	10 February 1946	Shared sinking of U-651 29 June 41. Sank U-641 single-handed 19 January 44. Sold on 17 May 1947 as mercantile La Aguerra. Resold in 1949 to Spain as mercantile La Guera then in 1958 as mercantile Claudio Sabadell. Scrapped in October 1970 at Bilbao
Wallflower	Smiths Dock Co., South Bank-on-Tees	23 July 1940	14 November 1940	7 March 1941		Shared sinking of U-523 25 August 43. Sold on 29 July 1946. Resold in 1949 as buoy tender Asbjørn Larsen, 1950 converted to whale catcher. Scrapped in October 1966 at Grimstad.
Windflower	Davie Shipbuilding & Repairing Co. Ltd., Lauzon, Quebec	25 February 1940	4 July 1940			Transferred on 15 May 1941 before completion to RCN as Windflower.
Woodruff	W. Simons & Co., Renfrew	29 April 1940	28 February 1941	7 April 1941		Sold in 1947, converted to whale catcher. Resold in 1948 as buoy tender Southern Lupin and later as whale catcher. 1950 to 1952 and since 1954 laid up. Scrapped in 1959 at Odense.
Zinnia	Smiths Dock Co., South Bank-on-Tees	20 August 1940	28 November 1940	30 March 1941	23 August 1941	Torpedoed and sunk on 23 August 1941 by U-564 while escorting convoy OG 71 west of Portugal at 40-25N, 10-40W.

==== South African Navy ====
Construction data for Flower-class corvettes of the South African Navy
Ship	Builder	Laid down	Launched	Commissioned	Paid off	Fate
Protea	Charles Hill & Sons Ltd., Bristol	28 October 1940	26 July 1941	4 October 1947		Formerly Rockrose. Transferred on 4 October 1947 to the South African Navy. Converted to a survey vessel. Scrapped in 1967.

==== Royal Netherlands Navy ====
Construction data for Flower-class corvettes of the Royal Netherlands Navy
Ship	Builder	Laid down	Launched	Commissioned	Paid off	Fate
Friso	Grangemouth Dry Dock Co., Grangemouth	31 October 1939	8 July 1940	26 March 1943	4 October 1944	Formerly Carnation. Transferred on 26 March 1943 to the Royal Netherlands Navy. Returned to RN on 4 October 1944.

==== Royal Norwegian Navy ====
Construction data for Flower-class corvettes of the Royal Norwegian Navy
Ship	Builder	Laid down	Launched	Commissioned	Paid off	Fate
Andenes	Ailsa Shipbuilding Co. Ltd., Troon	21 December 1939	26 May 1941	1 October 1941	1956	Formerly HMS Acanthus. Transferred to the Royal Norwegian Navy on 1 October 1941. Bought by Norway in 1946 as a fishery protection ship. Reclassified in 1950 as a frigate with pennant number F307. Sold in 1956 as whale catcher Colin Frye. Resold in 1957 as Toshi Maru No. 2. Scrapped in 1970 in Japan.
Buttercup	Harland & Wolff Ltd., Belfast	17 December 1940	10 April 1941	20 December 1944	November 1957	Formerly HMS Buttercup. Transferred to the Royal Norwegian Navy on 20 December 1944. Bought by Norway in 1946 as fishery protection ship Nordkyn. Sold in November 1957 as whaling ship Thoris. Scrapped in June 1969.
Eglantine	Harland & Wolff Ltd., Belfast	16 January 1941	11 June 1941	29 August 1941	August 1956	Formerly HMS Eglantine. Transferred to the Royal Norwegian Navy on 29 August 1941. Bought by Norway in 1946 as fishery protection ship Soroy. Sold in August 1956 and converted to diesel-engined whale catcher Thorglimt. Scrapped in June 1969 at Grimstad.
Montbretia	Fleming & Ferguson Ltd., Paisley	16 November 1940	27 May 1941	29 September 1941	18 November 1942	Formerly HMS Montbretia. Transferred to the Royal Norwegian Navy on 29 September 1941. Torpedoed and sunk by U-262 on 18 November 1942 at 53-37N, 38-15W. 48 crew killed, 23 survivors were rescued by Potentilla.
Potentilla	W. Simons & Co., Renfrew	28 February 1941	18 December 1941	16 January 1942	13 March 1944	Formerly HMS Potentilla. Transferred to the Royal Norwegian Navy on 16 January 1942. Returned to RN on 13 March 1944.
Rose	W. Simons & Co., Renfrew	3 September 1940	22 September 1941	31 October 1941	26 October 1944	Formerly HMS Rose. Transferred to the Royal Norwegian Navy on 26 October 1941 and commissioned on 31 October 1941. Rammed and sunk on 26 October 1944 by Manners at 45-50N, 40-15W. 3 crew were killed.

==== Royal Hellenic Navy ====
Construction data for Flower-class corvettes of the Royal Hellenic Navy
Ship	Builder	Laid down	Launched	Commissioned	Paid off	Fate
Apostolis	Harland & Wolff Ltd., Belfast	20 April 1940	19 August 1940	24 October 1943	1952	Formerly HMS Hyacinth. Transferred to the Royal Hellenic Navy on 24 October 1943. Returned to RN in 1952.
Kriezis	A. & J. Inglis Ltd., Glasgow	19 September 1939	23 April 1940	10 November 1943	1 June 1952	Formerly HMS Coreopsis. Transferred to the Royal Hellenic Navy on 10 November 1943. Returned to RN on 1 June 1952.
Sachtouris	Harland & Wolff Ltd., Belfast	24 February 1940	4 June 1940	1943	1951	Formerly HMS Peony. Transferred to the Royal Hellenic Navy in 1943. Returned to RN in September 1951.
Tombazis	Fleming & Ferguson Ltd., Paisley	10 February 1941	28 July 1941	November 1943		Formerly HMS Tamarisk. Transferred to the Royal Hellenic Navy in November 1943. Returned to RN in 1952.

==== United States Navy ====
Construction data for Flower-class corvettes of the United States Navy
Ship	Builder	Laid down	Launched	Commissioned	Paid off	Fate
Courage	Harland & Wolff Ltd., Belfast	14 November 1939	20 April 1940	3 April 1942	22 August 1945	Formerly HMS Heartsease. Transferred to USN on 3 April 1942. Returned to RN on 23 August 1945.
Fury	Fleming & Ferguson Ltd., Paisley	26 March 1940	5 September 1940	17 March 1942	22 August 1945	Formerly HMS Larkspur. Transferred to USN on 17 March 1942. Returned to RN on 22 August 1945.
Impulse	Cook, Welton & Gemmell, Beverley	13 March 1940	18 September 1940	10 March 1942	22 August 1945	Formerly HMS Begonia. Transferred to USN on 10 March 1942. Returned to RN on 22 August 1945.
Ready	Harland & Wolff Ltd., Belfast	30 October 1939	21 March 1940	12 March 1942	23 August 1945	Formerly HMS Calendula. Transferred to USN on 12 March 1942. Returned to RN on 23 August 1945.
Restless	Harland & Wolff Ltd., Belfast	30 October 1939	24 February 1940	15 March 1942	20 August 1945	Formerly HMS Periwinkle. Transferred to USN on 15 March 1942. Returned to RN on 26 August 1945.
Saucy	Harland & Wolff Ltd., Belfast	30 October 1939	14 February 1940	30 April 1942	20 August 1945	Formerly HMS Arabis. Transferred to USN on 30 April 1942. Returned to RN on 26 August 1945.
Spry	Harland & Wolff Ltd., Belfast	14 November 1939	6 April 1940	2 May 1942	20 August 1945	Formerly HMS Hibiscus. Transferred to the USN on 2 May 1942. Returned to RN on 26 August 1945.
Surprise	John Crown & Sons Ltd., Sunderland	23 October 1939	5 June 1940	24 March 1942	20 August 1945	Formerly HMS Heliotrope. Transferred to USN on 24 March 1942. Returned to RN on 26 August 1945.
Temptress	Smiths Dock Co., South Bank-on-Tees	9 July 1940	17 October 1940	21 March 1942	20 August 1945	Formerly HMS Veronica. Transferred to USN on 16 February 1942. Returned to RN on 26 August 1945.
Tenacity	Grangemouth Dry Dock Co., Grangemouth	31 October 1939	8 July 1940	11 June 1942	22 August 1945	Formerly HMS Candytuft. Transferred to USN on 4 March 1942. Returned to RN on 26 August 1945.

=== Flower-class (modified) ===
==== Royal Canadian Navy ====
Construction data for modified Flower-class corvettes of the Royal Canadian Navy
Ship	Builder	Laid down	Launched	Commissioned	Paid off	Fate
Asbestos	Morton Engineering & Dry Dock Co., Quebec City	20 July 1943	22 November 1943	16 June 1944	8 July 1945	Scrapped in March 1949 at New Orleans.
Atholl	Morton Engineering & Dry Dock Co., Quebec City	15 August 1942	4 April 1943	14 October 1943	17 July 1945	Scrapped in October 1952 in Canada.
Beauharnois	Morton Engineering & Dry Dock Co., Quebec City	8 November 1943	11 May 1944	25 September 1944	12 July 1945	Sold in 1946 to the "Mossad Le'Aliya bet" in Quebec (The Institute for Immigration B) as a passenger vessel Yoashia Wegwood. Transferred to Israel in 1948 as corvette HaShomer.
Belleville	Kingston Shipbuilding Co. Ltd., Kingston, Ontario	21 January 1944	17 June 1944	19 October 1944	5 July 1945	Sold in 1947 to the Dominican Republic as Juan Bautista Cambiaso.
Brampton						Cancelled in December 1943.
Charlottetown	Kingston Shipbuilding Co. Ltd., Kingston, Ontario	7 June 1941	10 September 1941	13 December 1941	11 September 1942	Torpedoed and sunk on 11 September 1942 by U-517 while escorting convoy SQ-30 in the Saint Lawrence River north of Cap-Chat at 49-10N, 66-50W. 9 crew killed.
Cobourg	Midland Shipyards Ltd., Midland, Ontario	25 November 1942	14 July 1943	11 May 1944	15 June 1945	Sold in 1947 as mercantile Camco. Resold in 1956 to Panama as mercantile Puerto del Sol. Burned and sunk in 1971.
Fergus	Collingwood Shipbuilding Ltd., Collingwood, Ontario	10 December 1943	30 August 1944	18 November 1944	14 July 1945	Sold in 1945 as mercantile Camco II. Resold in 1948 as Hartcourt Kent. Wrecked in 1949.
Forrest Hill	Ferguson Bros. (Port Glasgow) Ltd., Port Glasgow	5 February 1943	30 August 1943	1 December 1943	9 July 1945	Formerly Ceanothos. Transferred to RCN before completion.
Frontenac	Kingston Shipbuilding Co. Ltd., Kingston, Ontario	19 February 1943	2 June 1943	26 October 1943	22 July 1945	Sold in October 1945 to United Ship Corporation.
Giffard	Alexander Hall & Co., Aberdeen	30 November 1942	19 June 1943	10 November 1943	5 July 1945	Formerly Buddleia. Scrapped in October 1952 in Canada.
Guelph	Collingwood Shipbuilding Ltd., Collingwood, Ontario	29 May 1943	20 December 1943	9 May 1944	27 June 1945	Sold in 1945 to Panama as mercantile Guelph (name not changed). Resold in 1956 as Burfin.
Hawkesbury	Morton Engineering & Dry Dock Co., Quebec City	20 July 1943	16 November 1943	14 June 1944	10 July 1945	Sold in 1950 to Cambodia as Campuchea.
Ingersoll						Cancelled in December 1943.
Lachute	Morton Engineering & Dry Dock Co., Quebec City	24 November 1943	9 June 1944	26 October 1944	10 July 1945	Sold in 1947 to the Dominican Republic and renamed Cristobal Colon. Wrecked by Hurricane David on 30 August 1979.
Lindsay	Midland Shipyards Ltd., Midland, Ontario	30 September 1942	4 June 1943	15 November 1943	18 July 1945	Sold in 1946 as mercantile North Shore.
Listowel						Cancelled in December 1943.
Long Branch	A. & J. Inglis Ltd., Glasgow	27 February 1943	28 September 1943	5 January 1944	17 June 1945	Formerly Candytuft. Sold in 1947 as mercantile Rexton Kent II.
Louisburg	Morton Engineering & Dry Dock Co., Quebec City	11 January 1943	13 July 1943	13 December 1943	25 June 1945	Sold in 1947 to the Dominican Republic and renamed Juan Alejandro Acosta. Wrecked by Hurricane David on 30 August 1979.
Meaford						Cancelled in December 1943.
Merrittonia	Morton Engineering & Dry Dock Co., Quebec City	23 November 1943	24 June 1944	10 November 1944	11 July 1945	Formerly Pointe Claire.
Mimico	John Crown & Sons Ltd., Sunderland	22 February 1943	11 October 1943	8 February 1944	18 July 1945	Formerly Bullrush. Sold to Honduras and converted 1950 in Germany to whale catcher Olympic Victor. Resold in 1956 to Japan as Otori Maru No. 12 and in 1962 as Kyo Maru No. 25.
Norsyd	Morton Engineering & Dry Dock Co., Quebec City	14 January 1943	31 July 1943	22 December 1943	25 June 1945	Sold in 1946 to Yugoslavia as mercantile Balboa under Panamanian flag. Resold to the "Mossad Le'Aliya bet" (The Institute for Immigration B) while still in Quebec as a passenger vessel Hagana. Transferred to Israel in 1948 as corvette Hagana.
North Bay	Collingwood Shipbuilding Ltd., Collingwood, Ontario	29 September 1942	27 April 1943	25 October 1943	5 June 1945	Sold in 1946 as mercantile Kent County II. Resold in 1950 as Galloway Kent and in 1951 as Bedford II.
Owen Sound	Collingwood Shipbuilding Ltd., Collingwood, Ontario	11 November 1942	15 June 1943	17 November 1943	19 July 1945	Sold in 1945 to Greece as Cadio.
Parry Sound	Marine Industries Ltd., Sorel-Tracy, Quebec	11 June 1943	13 November 1943	30 August 1944	10 July 1945	Sold in 1950 to Honduras, converted to whale catcher Olympic Champion. Resold in 1956 to Japan as Otori Maru No. 15, 1961 renamed Kyo Maru No. 22.
Peterborough	Kingston Shipbuilding Co. Ltd., Kingston, Ontario	14 September 1943	15 January 1944	1 June 1944	19 July 1945	Sold in 1947 to the Dominican Republic as Gerardo Jansen.
Renfrew						Cancelled in December 1943.
Riviere du Loup	Morton Engineering & Dry Dock Co., Quebec City	5 January 1943	2 July 1943	21 November 1943	2 July 1945	Sold in 1947 to the Dominican Republic as Juan Bautista Maggiolo.
Smiths Falls	Kingston Shipbuilding Co. Ltd., Kingston, Ontario	21 January 1944	19 August 1944	28 November 1944	8 July 1945	Sold in 1950 to Honduras, converted to whale catcher Olympic Lightning. Resold in 1956 to Japan as Otori Maru No. 16, 1961 renamed Kyo Maru No. 23.
St. Lambert	Morton Engineering & Dry Dock Co., Quebec City	8 July 1943	6 November 1943	27 May 1944	20 July 1945	Sold in 1946 to Panama as Chrysi Hondroulis. Resold in 1955 to Greece as Loula.
Stellarton	Morton Engineering & Dry Dock Co., Quebec City	16 November 1943	27 April 1944	29 September 1944	1 July 1945	Sold in 1946 to Chile as Casma.
Strathroy	Marine Industries Ltd., Sorel-Tracy, Quebec	18 November 1943	15 June 1944	20 November 1944	12 July 1945	Sold in 1946 to Chile as Chipana.
Thorlock	Marine Industries Ltd., Sorel-Tracy, Quebec	25 September 1943	15 May 1944	13 November 1944	15 July 1945	Sold in 1946 to Chile as Papudo.
Trentonian	Kingston Shipbuilding Co. Ltd., Kingston, Ontario	19 February 1943	1 September 1943	1 December 1943	22 February 1945	Torpedoed and sunk on 22 February 1945 by U-1004 off Falmouth, Cornwall at 50-06N, 04-50W. 6 crew were lost.
West York	Midland Shipyards Ltd., Midland, Ontario	23 July 1943	25 January 1944	6 October 1944	9 July 1945	Sold in 1945 as mercantile West York (name not changed). Resold in 1960 as Federal Express. Rammed and sunk in 1960 in the Saint Lawrence River near Montreal. Raised and scrapped.
Whitby	Marine Industries Ltd., Sorel-Tracy,	1 April 1943	18 September 1943	6 June 1944	16 July 1945	Acquired by the Portuguese Navy from the US and renamed NRP Bengo on 29 April 1948 and transferred to the Mozambique Pilots on 1 October 1948 where she was named just Bengo.

==== Royal Indian Navy ====
Construction data for modified Flower-class corvettes of the Royal Indian Navy
Ship	Builder	Laid down	Launched	Commissioned	Paid off	Fate
Assam	John Crown & Sons Ltd., Sunderland	26 November 1942	21 June 1943	19 February 1945		Formerly HMS Bugloss. Transferred to the RIN on 19 February 1945. Returned to RN in 1947. Scrapped.
Gondwana	Ferguson Bros. (Port Glasgow) Ltd., Port Glasgow	2 November 1942	31 May 1943	15 May 1945	17 May 1946	Formerly HMS Burnet. Transferred to the RIN on 15 May 1945. Returned to RN on 17 May 1946. 1947 sold to Royal Thai Navy, renamed Bangpakong
Sind	Alexander Hall & Co., Aberdeen	26 September 1942	22 April 1943	24 August 1945	17 May 1946	Formerly HMS Betony. Transferred to the RIN on 24 August 1945. Returned to RN on 17 May 1946. 1947 sold to Royal Thai Navy, renamed Prasae , stranded 7. January 1951 on the North-Korean east coast, total loss.
Mahratta	Ferguson Bros. (Port Glasgow) Ltd., Port Glasgow	6 April 1943	16 November 1943	1946	1947 loss	Formerly HMS Charlock. Transferred to the RIN 1946. 1947 stranded and total loss.

==== Royal New Zealand Navy ====
Construction data for modified Flower-class corvettes of the Royal New Zealand Navy
Ship	Builder	Laid down	Launched	Commissioned	Paid off	Fate
Arabis	George Brown & Co., Greenock	26 February 1943	28 October 1943	16 March 1944	1948	Formerly HMS Arabis. Transferred to RNZN on 16 March 1944. Returned to RN in 1948.
Arbutus	George Brown & Co., Greenock	3 May 1943	26 January 1944	5 July 1944	1948	Formerly HMS Arbutus. Transferred to RNZN on 5 July 1944. Returned to RN in 1948.

==== Royal Navy ====
Construction data for modified Flower-class corvettes of the Royal Navy
Ship	Builder	Laid down	Launched	Commissioned	Paid off	Fate
Arabis	George Brown & Co., Greenock	26 February 1943	28 October 1943			Transferred on 16 March 1944 to the Royal New Zealand Navy as HMNZS Arabis. Returned to RN in 1948. Scrapped in August 1951 at Grays.
Arbutus	George Brown & Co., Greenock	3 May 1943	26 January 1944			Second ship of this type to bear the name. For history of the first see below under ships lost in action. This ship transferred on 5 July 1944 to the Royal New Zealand Navy as Arbutus. Returned to RN in 1948. Scrapped in June 1951 at Dunston.
Balm	—N/a	—N/a	—N/a	—N/a	—N/a	Cancelled on 12 November 1942.
Betony	Alexander Hall & Co., Aberdeen	26 September 1942	22 April 1943	31 August 1943	24 March 1945	Transferred on 24 August 1945 to India as Sind. Returned to RN on 17 May 1946. Transferred in 1947 to Thailand as Prasae. Grounded on 7 January 1951 along east coast of Korea and scuttled on 13 January 1951.
Buddleia	Alexander Hall & Co., Aberdeen	30 November 1942	19 June 1943			Transferred on 10 November 1943 to RCN as Giffard.
Bugloss	John Crown & Sons Ltd., Sunderland	26 November 1942	21 June 1943	8 November 1943	19 February 1945	Transferred on 19 February 1945 to Indian Navy as Assam. Returned to RN in 1947 and scrapped.
Bullrush	John Crown & Sons Ltd., Sunderland	22 February 1943	11 October 1943			Transferred on 8 February 1944 to RCN as Mimico.
Burnet	Ferguson Bros. (Port Glasgow) Ltd., Port Glasgow	2 November 1942	31 May 1943	23 September 1943		Transferred on 15 May 1945 to India as HMIS Gondwana. Returned to RN on 17 May 1946. Transferred on 15 May 1947 to Thailand.
Candytuft	A. & J. Inglis Ltd., Glasgow	27 February 1943	28 September 1943			Transferred on 5 January 1944 to RCN as HMCS Long Branch.
Ceanothos	Ferguson Bros. (Port Glasgow) Ltd., Port Glasgow	5 February 1943	30 August 1943			Transferred on 1 December 1943 to RCN as HMCS Forrest Hill.
Charlock	Ferguson Bros. (Port Glasgow) Ltd., Port Glasgow	6 April 1943	16 November 1943	March 1944		Transferred in 1946 to India as HMIS Mahratta. 1947 total loss.
Comfrey	Collingwood Shipbuilding Ltd., Collingwood, Ontario	6 January 1942	28 July 1942			Transferred on 22 November 1942 to USN as USS Action.
Cornel	Collingwood Shipbuilding Ltd., Collingwood, Ontario	6 January 1942	4 September 1942			Transferred on 10 December 1942 to USN as USS Alacrity.
Dittany	Collingwood Shipbuilding Ltd., Collingwood, Ontario		31 October 1942	31 May 1943		Formerly USS Beacon. Transferred to RN on 31 May 1943 under the lend-lease program. Returned to USN on 20 June 1946.
Flax	Kingston Shipbuilding Co. Ltd., Kingston, Ontario		15 June 1942			Transferred on 6 December 1942 to USN as USS Brisk.
Honesty	Kingston Shipbuilding Co. Ltd., Kingston, Ontario		28 September 1942			Formerly USS Caprice. Transferred to RN under the lend-lease program. Returned to USN on 5 January 1946.
Linaria	Midland Shipyards Ltd., Midland, Ontario		18 November 1942	22 June 1943		Formerly USS Clash. Transferred to RN under the lend-lease program. Returned to USN on 27 July 1946.
Mandrake	Morton Engineering & Dry Dock Co., Quebec City	November 1941	22 August 1942			Transferred on 6 April 1943 to USN as USS Haste.
Milfoil	Morton Engineering & Dry Dock Co., Quebec City	November 1941	5 August 1942			Transferred on 31 March 1943 to USN as USS Intensity.
Musk	Morton Engineering & Dry Dock Co., Quebec City	28 November 1941	15 July 1942			Transferred on 22 December 1942 to USN as USS Might.
Nepeta	Morton Engineering & Dry Dock Co., Quebec City	22 July 1942	29 November 1942			Transferred on 23 July 1943 to USN as USS Pert.
Privet	Morton Engineering & Dry Dock Co., Quebec City	14 August 1942	4 December 1942			Transferred on 16 August 1943 to USN as USS Prudent.
Rosebay	Kingston Shipbuilding Co. Ltd., Kingston, Ontario		11 February 1943	28 July 1943	20 March 1946	Formerly USS Splendor. Transferred to RN under the lend-lease program. Returned to USN on 20 March 1946.
Smilax	Collingwood Shipbuilding Ltd., Collingwood, Ontario		24 December 1942	21 June 1943		Formerly USS Tact. Transferred to RN under the lend-lease program. Returned to USN on 5 January 1946.
Statice	Collingwood Shipbuilding Ltd., Collingwood, Ontario		10 April 1943	20 September 1943		Formerly USS Vim. Transferred to RN under the lend-lease program. Returned to USN on 21 June 1946.
Willowherb	Midland Shipyards Ltd., Midland, Ontario		24 March 1943			Formerly USS Vitality. Transferred to RN under the lend-lease program. Returned to USN on 11 June 1946.

==== United States Navy ====
Construction data for modified Flower-class corvettes of the United States Navy
Ship	Builder	Laid down	Launched	Commissioned	Paid off	Fate
Action	Collingwood Shipbuilding Ltd., Collingwood, Ontario	6 January 1942	28 July 1942	22 November 1942	6 September 1945	Formerly HMS Comfrey. Transferred to USN on 22 November 1942. Sold on 6 February 1946.
Alacrity	Collingwood Shipbuilding Ltd., Collingwood, Ontario	6 January 1942	4 September 1942	10 December 1942	4 October 1945	Formerly HMS Cornel. Transferred to USN on 10 December 1942. Sold on 22 September 1945 to Italy as mercantile Rio Marina.
Beacon	Collingwood Shipbuilding Ltd., Collingwood, Ontario		31 October 1942			Transferred on 31 May 1943 to RN as HMS Dittany. Returned to USN on 20 June 1946.
Brisk	Kingston Shipbuilding Co. Ltd., Kingston, Ontario		15 June 1942	6 December 1942	9 October 1945	Formerly HMS Flax. Transferred to USN on 6 December 1942. Sold on 18 October 1946.
Caprice	Collingwood Shipbuilding Ltd., Collingwood, Ontario		31 October 1942			Transferred to RN as HMS Honesty. Returned to USN on 20 June 1946.
Clash	Midland Shipyards Ltd., Midland, Ontario		18 November 1942			Transferred to RN as HMS Linaria. Returned to USN on 27 July 1946.
Haste	Morton Engineering & Dry Dock Co., Quebec City	November 1941	22 August 1942	6 April 1943	3 October 1945	Formerly HMS Mandrake. Transferred to USN on 6 April 1943. Sold in 1949 to Italy as mercantile Porto Azzurro. Scrapped in 1973 at La Spezia.
Intensity	Morton Engineering & Dry Dock Co., Quebec City	November 1941	22 August 1942	31 March 1943	3 October 1945	Formerly HMS Milfoil. Transferred to USN on 31 March 1943. Sold into mercantile service. 1950 whale catcher Olympic Promoter, 1956 resold and renamed Otori Maru No. 5
Might	Morton Engineering & Dry Dock Co., Quebec City	28 November 1941	15 July 1942	22 December 1942	9 October 1945	Formerly HMS Musk. Transferred to USN on 22 December 1942. Sold into mercantile service. 1950 whale catcher Olympic Explorer, 1956 resold and renamed Otori Maru No.3, later Kyo Maru No.12
Pert	Morton Engineering & Dry Dock Co., Quebec City	22 July 1942	27 November 1942	23 July 1943	3 October 1945	Formerly HMS Nepeta. Transferred to USN on 23 July 1943. Sold on 18 October 1946 into mercantile service. 1950 whale catcher Olympic Leader, 1956 resold and renamed Otori Maru No. 1, later Kyo Maru No. 15
Prudent	Morton Engineering & Dry Dock Co., Quebec City	14 August 1942	4 December 1942	16 August 1943	11 October 1945	Formerly HMS Privet. Transferred to USN on 16 August 1943. Sold in 1949 to Italy as mercantile Elbano. Resold in 1951 to the Italian Navy as hydrographic survey vessel Staffetta.
Splendor	Kingston Shipbuilding Co. Ltd., Kingston, Ontario		11 February 1943			Transferred to RN as HMS Rosebay. Returned to USN on 20 March 1946.
Tact	Collingwood Shipbuilding Ltd., Collingwood, Ontario		24 December 1942			Transferred to RN as HMS Smilax. Returned to USN on 5 January 1946.
Vim	Collingwood Shipbuilding Ltd., Collingwood, Ontario		10 April 1943			Transferred to RN as HMS Statice. Returned to USN on 21 June 1946.
Vitality	Midland Shipyards Ltd., Midland, Ontario		24 March 1943			Transferred to RN as HMS Willowherb. Returned to USN on 11 June 1946.

=== Vessels lost in action ===
Flower-class ships lost to enemy action
Ship	Flag	Date	Fate
Alysse	Free French Naval Forces	9 February 1942	Torpedoed and sunk by U-654 while escorting Convoy ON-60 about 420 nautical miles (780 km) E of Cape Race at 46°00′N 44°00′W 36 crew were killed.
La Bastiaise	Free French Naval Forces	22 June 1940	Mined during sea trial off Hartlepool on day of her commissioning.
Mimosa	Free French Naval Forces	9 June 1942	Torpedoed and sunk by U-124 while escorting Convoy ONS 100 at 52°12′N 32°37′W 58 French crew and 6 British crew were killed; the French crew being largely from Saint Pierre and Miquelon. 4 survivors rescued by HMCS Assiniboine.
Alberni	Royal Canadian Navy	21 August 1944	Torpedoed and sunk by U-480 while escorting a convoy in the English Channel S of St. Catherine's Point at 50°18′N 00°51′W 59 crew killed and 31 rescued by RN motor torpedo boats.
Charlottetown	Royal Canadian Navy	11 September 1942	Torpedoed and sunk by U-517 while escorting Convoy SQ-30 in the Saint Lawrence River N of Cap-Chat at 49°10′N 66°50′W 9 crew killed.
Lévis	Royal Canadian Navy	19 September 1941	Torpedoed and sunk by U-74 while escorting Convoy SC 44 E of Cape Farewell at 60°07′N 38°37′W 18 crew killed and 91 rescued.
Louisburg	Royal Canadian Navy	6 February 1943	Bombed and torpedoed by Luftwaffe aircraft while escorting Convoy KMF-8 off Cape Tenes in Mediterranean Sea at 36°15′N 00°15′E 59 crew killed, 50 rescued.
Regina	Royal Canadian Navy	8 August 1944	Torpedoed and sunk by U-667 off Trevose Head at 50°42′N 05°03′W 30 crew were killed.
Shawinigan	Royal Canadian Navy	25 November 1944	Torpedoed and sunk by U-1228 in the Cabot Strait at 47°34′N 59°11′W. All hands were lost.
Spikenard	Royal Canadian Navy	11 February 1942	Torpedoed and sunk by U-136 while escorting Convoy SC 67 W of Malin Head at 56°10′N 21°07′W. 8 crew survived.
Weyburn	Royal Canadian Navy	22 February 1943	Mined on 22 February 1943 off Cape Espartel at 36°46′N 06°02′W. 7 crew were killed.
Windflower	Royal Canadian Navy	7 December 1941	Rammed and sunk while escorting Convoy SC 58 after colliding with freighter Zypenberg in dense fog on the Grand Banks at 46°19′N 49°30′W 23 crew were killed.
Abelia	Royal Navy	9 January 1944	Torpedoed and badly damaged by a U-boat.
Arbutus	Royal Navy	5 February 1942	Torpedoed and sunk by U-136 W of Erris Head, Ireland at 55°05′N 18°43′W
Asphodel	Royal Navy	10 March 1944	Torpedoed and sunk by U-575 while escorting Convoy SL-150 and Convoy MKS-41 at 45°24′N 18°09′W. 92 crew were killed, 5 survivors rescued by HMS Clover.
Auricula	Royal Navy	6 May 1942	Mined in Courrier Bay, Madagascar at 12°12′S 49°19′E. Foundered the next day while under tow.
Bluebell	Royal Navy	17 February 1945	Torpedoed and sunk by U-711 off the Kola Inlet at 69°36′N 35°29′E
Bryony	Royal Navy	15 April 1941	Bombed and sunk during sea trials by the Luftwaffe. Raised and repaired. Transferred to the Royal Norwegian Navy in 1947 as HNoMS Polarfront.
Erica	Royal Navy	9 February 1943	Mined and sunk while escorting a convoy in the Mediterranean Sea off Derna, Libya at 32°48′N 21°10′E. Entire crew rescued by 'HMSAS Southern Maid.
Fleur de Lys	Royal Navy	14 October 1941	Torpedoed and sunk by U-206 west of Gibraltar at 36°00′N 06°30′W. There were 3 survivors.
Gardenia	Royal Navy	9 November 1942	Rammed and sunk off Oran at 35°49′N 01°05′W in collision with HMS Fluellen (T157).
Gladiolus	Royal Navy	17 October 1941	Torpedoed and sunk by U-558 while escorting Convoy SC 48 S of Iceland at 57°00′N 25°00′W. All hands were lost.
Godetia	Royal Navy	6 September 1940	Rammed and sunk 3 miles (4.8 km) off Altacarry Head at 55°18′N 05°57′W in collision with mercantile Marsa.
Hollyhock	Royal Navy	9 April 1942	Bombed and sunk by Japanese aircraft E of Ceylon at 07°21′N 81°57′E
Marigold	Royal Navy	9 December 1942	Torpedoed and sunk by the Regia Aeronautica while escorting Convoy KMS.3Y off Algiers at 36°50′N 03°00′E. 40 crew were killed.
Orchis	Royal Navy	21 August 1944	Mined and heavily damaged off Courseulles-sur-Mer. Beached on Juno Beach and declared a total loss.
Picotee	Royal Navy	12 August 1941	Torpedoed and sunk by U-568 while escorting Convoy ONS 4 S of Iceland at 62°00′N 16°01′W. All hands were lost.
Pink	Royal Navy	27 June 1944	Torpedoed and heavily damaged by U-988 off Normandy at 49°48′N 00°49′W. Declared a total loss and scrapped in 1947 at Llanelly.
Polyanthus	Royal Navy	21 September 1943	Torpedoed and sunk by U-952 while escorting Convoy ON 202 at 57°00′N 31°10′W. 1 survivor rescued by HMS Itchen but was killed when that ship was torpedoed and sunk by U-666 on 23 September 1943.
Salvia	Royal Navy	24 December 1941	Torpedoed and sunk by U-568 W of Alexandria at 31°46′N 28°00′E. All hands were lost.
Samphire	Royal Navy	30 January 1943	Torpedoed and sunk by Italian submarine Platino while escorting Convoy TE-14 off Béjaïa at 36°56′N 05°40′E
Snapdragon	Royal Navy	19 December 1942	Bombed and sunk by the Luftwaffe NW of Benghazi at 32°18′N 19°54′E
Vervain	Royal Navy	20 February 1945	Torpedoed and sunk by U-1276 SE of Dungarvan, Rep of Ireland at 51°47′N 07°06′W
Zinnia	Royal Navy	23 August 1941	Torpedoed and sunk by U-564 while escorting Convoy OG 71 W of Portugal at 40°25′N 10°40′W
Montbretia	Royal Norwegian Navy	18 November 1942	Torpedoed and sunk by U-262 at 53°37′N 38°15′W. 48 crew killed, 23 survivors were rescued by HNoMS Potentilla (K214).
Trentonian	Royal Canadian Navy	22 February 1945	Torpedoed and sunk on 22 February 1945 by U-1004 off Falmouth at 50°06′N 04°50′W. 6 crew were killed.

=== Kriegsmarine use ===
In 1940, four Flower-class corvettes were being built in St. Nazaire-Penhoet for the French Navy. They were seized by the Kriegsmarine (German Navy). Three were completed in 1943 and 1944. The fourth was never finished. Their designation "PA" stood for Patroullienboot Ausland (foreign patrol craft).

Construction data for Flower-class corvettes of the Kriegsmarine
Ship	Ordered	Launched	Intended French name	Completed	Fate
PA 1	September 1939	16 October 1940	Arquebuse	April 1944	Seized in June 1940 and served in 15 Vorposten Flottille. Sunk by aerial bombing 15 June 1944 at Le Havre
PA 2	September 1939	22 November 1940	Hallebarde	September 1943	Seized in June 1940 and served in 15 Vorposten Flottille. Sunk by aerial bombing 15 June 1944 at Le Havre
PA 3	September 1939	29 November 1940	Sabre	November 1943	Seized in June 1940 and served in 15 Vorposten Flottille. Sunk by aerial bombing 15 June 1944 at Le Havre
PA 4	September 1939	29 November 1940	Poignard	Not completed	Seized in June 1940. Launched 1 September 1944 as La Télindière. Sunk uncompleted as a block ship at Nantes

== Battle credits ==
- U-26 was sunk by Gladiolus on 1 July 1940.
- Marcello-class submarine Nani was sunk by Anemone on 7 January 1941
- U-70 was sunk by Camellia and Arbutus on 7 March 1941
- U-110 was captured on 9 May 1941 by the destroyers Bulldog and Broadway and the corvette Aubrietia. U-110 was sunk the next day to preserve the secret.
- U-147 was sunk by the destroyer Wanderer and Periwinkle on 2 June 1941
- U-556 was sunk by Nasturtium, Celandine, and Gladiolus on 17 June 1941
- U-651 was sunk by the destroyers Malcolm, Scimitar, the corvettes Arabis and Violet, and the minesweeper Speedwell on 29 June 1941
- U-401 was sunk by the destroyers Wanderer and St. Albans and the corvette Hydrangea on 3 August 1941
- U-501 was sunk by Chambly and Moosejaw on 10 September 1941
- Argonauta-class submarine Fisalia was sunk by Hyacinth on 28 September 1941
- U-204 was sunk by Mallow and the sloop Rochester on 19 October 1941
- U-433 was sunk by Marigold on 16 November 1941
- U-131 was sunk by the destroyers Exmoor, Blankney, Stanley, the corvette Pentstemon, the sloop Stork, and a Martlet aircraft from Audacity on 17 December 1941
- U-567 was sunk by the sloop Deptford and Samphire on 21 December 1941
- U-356 was sunk by the destroyer St. Laurent, with Chilliwack, Battleford and Napanee on 27 December 1942
- U-756 was sunk by Morden on 1 September 1942
- U-94 was sunk by a US Catalina flying boat and Oakville on 28 August 1942
- U-588 was sunk by Wetaskiwin and the destroyer Skeena on 31 July 1942
- U-379 was sunk by Dianthus on 8 August 1942
- Perla-class submarine Perla was captured by Hyacinth on 9 July 1942
- U-660 was scuttled after being damaged by Lotus and Starwort on 12 November 1942
- U-124 was sunk by Stonecrop and the sloop Black Swan on 2 April 1943
- U-82 was sunk by the sloop Rochester and Tamarisk on 6 February 1942
- U-252 was sunk by the sloop Stork and Vetch on 14 April 1942
- U-432 was sunk by the corvette Aconit on 11 March 1943
- U-444 was sunk by the destroyer Harvester and the corvette Aconit on 11 March 1943
- U-609 was sunk by the corvette Lobelia on 7 February 1943
- U-536 was sunk by the frigate Nene, with Snowberry and Calgary on 20 November 1943
- U-753 was sunk by Drumheller, the frigate Lagan, and a Canadian Sunderland seaplane on 13 May 1943
- Flutto-class submarine Tritone was sunk by Port Arthur and the destroyer Antelope on 19 January 1943
- U-163 was sunk by Prescott on 13 March 1943
- Acciaio-class submarine Avorio was sunk by Regina on 8 February 1943
- U-87 was sunk by Shediac and the destroyer St. Croix on 4 March 1943
- U-224 was sunk by Ville de Quebec on 13 January 1943
- U-135 was sunk by the sloop Rochester, the corvettes Mignonette and Balsam, and an American Consolidated PBY Catalina aircraft on 15 July 1943
- U-306 was sunk by the destroyer Whitehall and Geranium on 31 October 1943
- U-617 was destroyed while grounded by Hyacinth and the Australian minesweeper Wollongong on 12 September 1943
- U-436 was sunk by the frigate Test and Hyderabad on 26 May 1943
- U-192 was sunk by Loosestrife on 6 May 1943
- U-125 was sunk by the destroyer Oribi and Snowflake on 6 May 1943
- U-634 was sunk by the sloop Stork and Stonecrop on 30 August 1943
- U-638 was sunk by Sunflower on 5 May 1943
- U-631 was sunk by Sunflower on 17 October 1943
- U-282 was sunk by the destroyers Vidette and Duncan and the corvette Sunflower on 29 October 1943
- U-414 was sunk by Vetch. on 25 May 1943
- U-523 was sunk by the destroyer Wanderer and Wallflower on 25 August 1943
- U-757 was sunk by the frigate Bayntun and Camrose on 8 January 1944
- U-744 was sunk by the destroyers Icarus, Chaudiere, Gatineau, the frigate St. Catharines, and the corvettes Fennel, Chilliwack, and Kenilworth Castle on 6 March 1944
- U-741 was sunk by Orchis on 15 August 1944
- U-641 was sunk by Violet on 19 January 1944
- U-845 was sunk by the destroyers Forester and St. Laurent, the corvette Owen Sound and the frigate Swansea on 10 March 1944
- U-1199 was sunk by the destroyer Icarus and Mignonette on 21 January 1945

== Post-war use ==
The relatively small Flowers were among the first warships to be declared surplus by Allied navies following the end of World War II. They had seen years of hard service in the North Atlantic and were made obsolete by the numerous destroyer escorts and frigates that entered service in the latter part of the war.

32 vessels from the RN, RCN, and USN were transferred to Argentina, Chile, the Dominican Republic, Greece, India, the Republic of Ireland, South Africa, and Venezuela. These were typically operated according to their original design, as coastal patrol vessels, with many serving until the 1970s.

The Irish Navy bought three Flowers in 1946 (LE Macha, LE Cliona, and LE Maev). The fledgling navy had intended to buy three more corvettes, as well as a number of surplus minesweepers, but severe budget restrictions cancelled these plans, leaving the original three to serve alone through the 1950s and 1960s despite antiquated armament, poor accommodation, and maintenance problems. They were taken out of service between 1968 and 1970, and scrapped shortly afterwards. Replaced by Ton-class minesweepers before the building of a similar size vessel, LE Deirdre. Entry into the European Economic Community in 1973 assisted in funding for the building of three future ships.

110 surplus Flowers were sold for commercial use. These saw careers as mercantile freighters, smugglers, tugs, weather ships, and whalers. The remainder were scrapped. Of particular interest is the story of HMCS Sudbury. She was declared surplus by the RCN and sold as a towboat specializing in deep-sea salvage. In November 1955, she rescued the freighter Makedonia in the North Pacific, towing the vessel for over one month through severe weather, becoming one of the most famous salvage ships of all time.

The surplus RCN Flowers Norsyd and Beauharnois were sold as mercantile freighters but were subsequently acquired in 1946 by the Mossad LeAliyah Bet, a branch of the Jewish Defense Association (Haganah) in the British Mandate for Palestine. Mossad Le'aliyah Bet organized Jewish immigration from Europe into Palestine, in violation of unilateral British restrictions. The corvettes were intercepted in the Mediterranean Sea during the summer of 1946 by the destroyer Venus and interned in Palestine. After Israel became independent in 1948, these commercial ships were commissioned into the Israeli Navy as the warships Hashomer and Hagana respectively.

Allied navies disposed of their Flowers so quickly following the war, the RN could not supply a single vessel to play Compass Rose in the 1953 film production of Nicholas Monsarrat's novel The Cruel Sea. The Royal Hellenic Navy supplied Kriezis (formerly HMS Coreopsis) for the role prior to her scrapping.

The only survivor of the entire class is Sackville, owned by the Canadian Naval Memorial Trust. She was laid up in reserve in March 1946 and converted in 1952 to a research vessel for Canadian Department of Marine and Fisheries, a role she served in until the early 1980s when she was acquired by the trust. She has been restored to her wartime appearance and serves in the summer months as a museum ship in Halifax, Nova Scotia, while wintering securely in the naval dockyard at CFB Halifax under the care of Maritime Forces Atlantic, Maritime Command.

Sackville's presence in Halifax is considered very appropriate, given the port was an important North American convoy assembly port during the war. Sackville makes her first appearance each spring when she is towed by a naval tug from HMC Dockyard to a location off Point Pleasant Park on the first Sunday in May to participate in the Commemoration of the Battle of the Atlantic ceremonies held at a memorial in the park overlooking the entrance to Halifax Harbour. Sackville typically hosts several dozen RCN veterans on this day and has participated in several burials at sea for dispersing the ashes of RCN veterans of the Battle of the Atlantic at this location.

== Literature ==
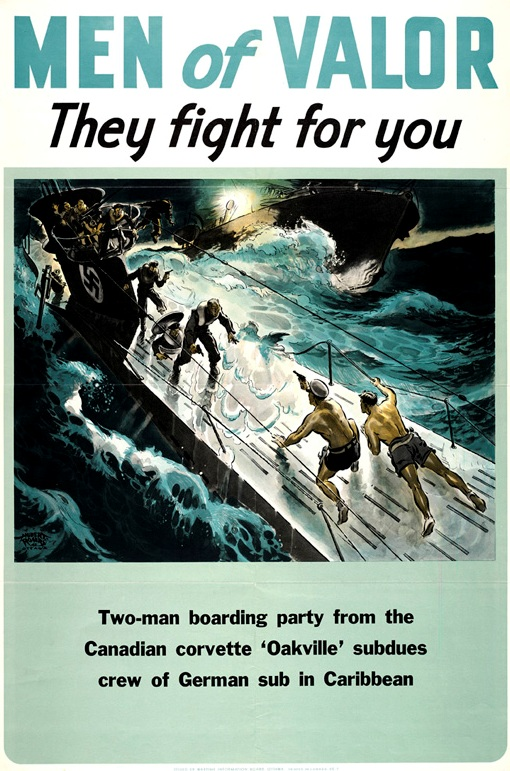
Wartime artwork of Hal Lawrence and HMCS Oakville.

- Alex H. Cherry wrote Yankee R N, the story of a Wall Street banker who volunteered for active duty in the RN, including details of Flower operations.
- Peter Coy, who served in Narcissus in the North Atlantic between June 1942 and August 1944, wrote 'The Echo of a Fighting Flower' about her and B3 Escort Group, comprising two British and four Free French corvettes.
- Hugh Garner wrote Storm Below which provides a detailed account of Flower-class corvettes and the stresses of shipboard life during World War II.
- James B. Lamb wrote The Corvette Navy, which accounts the use of these vessels by the RCN during World War II.
- Hal Lawrence wrote A Bloody War including first-hand accounts of his service aboard Moosejaw and Oakville.
- Nicholas Monsarrat wrote the best-known fictionalised account of Flower-class corvette operations in his novel The Cruel Sea. A less well known volume by the same author, Three Corvettes, is a collection of wartime essays of his personal experiences as an officer on board a Flower, although only the first part deals with North Atlantic convoy escort duties.
- Robert Radcliffe wrote Upon Dark Waters, a fictionalized account of Flower-class corvette Daisy, set in 1942 on the North Atlantic.
- Denys Rayner wrote Escort, a first-hand account of his experiences as an officer aboard a Flower.
- Douglas Reeman's 1969 novel To Risks Unknown features the fictional Flower-class corvette Thistle.
- Mac Johnston wrote "Corvettes Canada" aptly subtitled "Convoy Veterans of World War II Tell Their True Stories."

== See also ==
- American Flower-class corvettes
- Bathurst-class corvette
- Whale catcher
- List of escorteurs of the French Navy
