= List of corvettes of World War II =

This is a list of corvettes of World War II.

The List of ships of World War II contains major military vessels of the war, arranged alphabetically and by type. The list includes armed vessels that served during the war and in the immediate aftermath, inclusive of localized ongoing combat operations, garrison surrenders, post-surrender occupation, colony re-occupation, troop and prisoner repatriation, to the end of 1945.

For smaller vessels, see also List of World War II ships of less than 1000 tons. Some uncompleted Axis ships are included, out of historic interest. Ships are designated to the country under which they operated for the longest period of the World War II, regardless of where they were built or previous service history.

List of corvettes of World War II
Ship	Class	Country or organization	Displacement (tons)	First commissioned	Fate
Abelia	Flower	Royal Navy	925	3 February 1941	Sold 1947
Aconit	Flower	French Navy	925	23 July 1941	30 April 1947
Action	Flower (modified)	United States Navy	1,015	22 November 1942	6 September 1945
Agassiz	Flower	Royal Canadian Navy	925	23 January 1941	paid off 14 June 1945
Alacrity	Flower (modified)	United States Navy	1,015	10 December 1942	4 October 1945
Alberni	Flower	Royal Canadian Navy	925	4 February 1941	sunk on 21 August 1944 by U-480
Algoma	Flower	Royal Canadian Navy	925	11 July 1941	paid off 6 July 1945
Alisma	Flower	Royal Navy	925	13 February 1941	
Alysse	Flower	French Navy	925	17 June 1941	9 February 1942
Amaranthus	Flower	Royal Navy	925	12 February 1941	
Amherst	Flower	Royal Canadian Navy	925	5 August 1941	paid off 16 July 1945
Anchusa	Flower	Royal Navy	925	1 March 1941	
Andenes	Flower	Royal Norwegian Navy	925	1 October 1941	
Anemone	Flower	Royal Navy	925	12 August 1940	
Arabis (I)	Flower	Royal Navy; United States Navy	925	5 April 1940	to USA 30 April 1942, to UK 26 August 1945
Arabis (II)	Flower (modified)	Royal New Zealand Navy	1,015	16 March 1944	paid off 1948
Arbutus (I)	Flower	Royal Navy	925	12 October 1940	sunk on 5 February 1942 by U-136
Arbutus (II)	Flower (modified)	Royal New Zealand Navy	1,015	5 July 1944	paid off 1948
Armeria	Flower	Royal Navy	925	28 March 1941	
Arrowhead	Flower	Royal Navy; Royal Canadian Navy	925	22 November 1940	Loaned to Canada 15 May 1941 Returned to RN 1945
Arvida	Flower	Royal Canadian Navy	925	22 May 1941	paid off 14 June 1945
Asbestos	Flower (modified)	Royal Canadian Navy	1,015	16 June 1944	8 July 1945
Asphodel	Flower	Royal Navy	925	11 September 1940	sunk 10 March 1944 by U-575
Assam	Flower (modified)	Royal Indian Navy	1,015	19 February 1945	paid off 1947
Aster	Flower	Royal Navy	925	9 April 1941	
Atholl	Flower (modified)	Royal Canadian Navy	1,015	14 October 1943	17 July 1945
Aubrietia	Flower	Royal Navy	925	23 December 1940	Sold 1948
Auricula	Flower	Royal Navy	925	5 March 1941	6 May 1942
Azalea	Flower	Royal Navy	925	27 January 1941	Sold 1946
Baddeck	Flower	Royal Canadian Navy	925	18 May 1941	paid off 4 July 1945
Balsam	Flower	Royal Navy	925	28 November 1942	
Barrie	Flower	Royal Canadian Navy	925	12 May 1941	paid off 26 June 1945
Battleford	Flower	Royal Canadian Navy	925	31 July 1941	paid off 18 July 1945
Beauharnois	Flower (modified)	Royal Canadian Navy	1,015	25 September 1944	12 July 1945
Begonia	Flower	Royal Navy; United States Navy	925	3 March 1941	to USA as Impulse 10 March 1942, to UK 22 August 1945, paid off 22 July 1948
Belleville	Flower (modified)	Royal Canadian Navy	1,015	19 October 1944	5 July 1945
Bellwort	Flower	Royal Navy	925	20 November 1941	Sold to Irish naval service 1946
Bengal	Bathurst	Royal Indian Navy	1,025	8 August 1942	Decommissioned 1960
Bergamot	Flower	Royal Navy	925	12 May 1941	Sold 1946
Betony	Flower (modified)	Royal Navy; Royal Indian Navy	1,015	31 August 1943	To RIN as Sind 24 March 1945
Bittersweet	Flower	Royal Navy; Royal Canadian Navy	925	23 January 1941	to Canada 15 May 1941, paid off 22 June 1945
Bluebell	Flower	Royal Navy	925	19 July 1940	sunk on 17 February 1945 by U-711
Bombay	Bathurst	Royal Indian Navy	1,025	24 April 1942	Decommissioned 1960
Borage	Flower	Royal Navy	925	29 April 1942	
Brandon	Flower	Royal Canadian Navy	925	22 July 1941	paid off 22 June 1945
Brantford	Flower	Royal Canadian Navy	925	15 May 1942	paid off 17 August 1945
Brisk	Flower (modified)	United States Navy	1,015	6 December 1942	9 October 1945
Bryony	Flower	Royal Navy	925	4 June 1942	sunk on 15 April 1941by aircraft
Buctouche	Flower	Royal Canadian Navy	925	5 June 1941	paid off 15 June 1945
Burdock	Flower	Royal Navy	925	27 March 1941	
Burnet	Flower (modified)	Royal Navy; Royal Indian Navy	1,015	23 September 1943	to RIN as Gondwana 15 May 1945
Buttercup	Flower	Royal Navy	925	24 April 1942	served RNSB, to Norway 20 December 1944
Calgary	Flower	Royal Canadian Navy	925	16 December 1941	paid off 19 June 1945
Calendula	Flower	Royal Navy; United States Navy	925	6 May 1940	to USA as Ready 12 March 1942, to UK 20 August 1945, paid off 1945
Camellia	Flower	Royal Navy	925	18 June 1940	
Campanula	Flower	Royal Navy	925	6 September 1940	
Campion	Flower	Royal Navy	925	7 July 1941	
Camrose	Flower	Royal Canadian Navy	925	30 June 1941	paid off 22 July 1945
Candytuft	Flower	Royal Navy; United States Navy	925	16 October 1940	to USA as Tenacity 4 March 1942, to UK 26 August 1945
Carnation	Flower	Royal Navy; Royal Netherlands Navy	925	22 February 1941	transferred to Netherlands 24 March 1943, paid off 4 October 1944
Celandine	Flower	Royal Navy	925	30 April 1941	
Chambly	Flower	Royal Canadian Navy	925	18 December 1940	paid off 20 June 1945
Charlock	Flower (modified)	Royal Navy; Royal Indian Navy	1,015	March 1944	to RIN post-war, paid off 1947
Charlottetown	Flower (modified)	Royal Canadian Navy	1,015	13 December 1941	sunk on 11 September 1942 by U-517
Chicoutimi	Flower	Royal Canadian Navy	925	12 May 1941	paid off 16 June 1945
Chilliwack	Flower	Royal Canadian Navy	925	8 April 1941	paid off 14 July 1945
Chrysanthemum	Flower	Royal Navy	925		
Clarkia	Flower	Royal Navy	925	22 April 1940	
Clematis	Flower	Royal Navy	925	27 July 1940	
Clover	Flower	Royal Navy	925	13 May 1941	
Cobalt	Flower	Royal Canadian Navy	925	25 November 1940	paid off 17 June 1945
Cobourg	Flower (modified)	Royal Canadian Navy	1,015	11 May 1944	15 June 1945
Collingwood	Flower	Royal Canadian Navy	925	19 November 1940	paid off 23 July 1945
Coltsfoot	Flower	Royal Navy	925	1 November 1941	
Columbine	Flower	Royal Navy	925	9 November 1940	
Commandant d'Estienne d'Orves	Flower	French Navy	925	23 May 1942	31 May 1947
Commandant Detroyat	Flower	French Navy	925	16 September 1941	1947
Commandant Drogou	Flower	French Navy	925	15 January 1942	May 1947
Convolvulus	Flower	Royal Navy	925	26 February 1941	Scrapped 1947
Coreopsis	Flower	Royal Navy; Hellenic Navy	925		to Greece as Kriezis 10 November 1943, out of service 1952.
Coriander	Flower	Royal Navy	925		
Cowslip	Flower	Royal Navy	925	9 August 1941	
Crocus	Flower	Royal Navy	925	20 October 1940	
Cyclamen	Flower	Royal Navy	925	30 September 1940	
Dahlia	Flower	Royal Navy	925	21 March 1941	
Dauphin	Flower	Royal Canadian Navy	925	17 May 1941	paid off 20 June 1945
Dawson	Flower	Royal Canadian Navy	925	6 October 1941	paid off 19 June 1945
Delphinium	Flower	Royal Navy	925	15 November 1940	
Dianella	Flower	Royal Navy	925	6 January 1941	
Dianthus	Flower	Royal Navy	925	17 March 1941	
Dittany	Flower (modified)	Royal Navy; United States Navy	1,015	7 March 1943	to USA as Beacon 7 March 1943, to UK 31 May 1943
Drumheller	Flower	Royal Canadian Navy	925	13 September 1941	paid off 11 July 1945
Dundas	Flower	Royal Canadian Navy	925	1 April 1942	paid off 17 July 1945
Dunvegan	Flower	Royal Canadian Navy	925	9 September 1941	paid off 3 July 1945
Edmundston	Flower	Royal Canadian Navy	925	21 October 1941	paid off 16 June 1945
Eglantine	Flower	Royal Norwegian Navy	925	29 August 1941	scrapped June 1969
Erica	Flower	Royal Navy	925	9 August 1940	sunk 9 February 1943
Eyebright	Flower	Royal Navy; Royal Canadian Navy	925	26 November 1940	to Canada 15 May 1941, paid off 17 June 1945
Fennel	Flower	Royal Navy; Royal Canadian Navy	925	16 January 1941	to Canada 15 May 1941, paid off 12 June 1945
Fergus	Flower (modified)	Royal Canadian Navy	1,015	18 November 1944	14 July 1945
Fleur de Lys	Flower	Royal Navy	925	26 August 1940	14 October 1941
Forrest Hill	Flower (modified)	Royal Canadian Navy	1,015	1 December 1943	9 July 1945
Fredericton	Flower	Royal Canadian Navy	925	8 December 1941	paid off 14 July 1945
Freesia	Flower	Royal Navy	925	19 November 1940	
Fritillary	Flower	Royal Navy	925	1 November 1941	
Frontenac	Flower (modified)	Royal Canadian Navy	1,015	26 October 1943	22 July 1945
Galt	Flower	Royal Canadian Navy	925	15 May 1941	paid off 21 June 1945
Giffard	Flower (modified)	Royal Canadian Navy	1,015	10 November 1943	5 July 1945
Gardenia	Flower	Royal Navy	925	24 May 1940	9 November 1942
Genista	Flower	Royal Navy	925	8 December 1941	
Gentian	Flower	Royal Navy	925	20 September 1940	
Geranium	Flower	Royal Navy	925	24 June 1940	
Gladiolus	Flower	Royal Navy	925	6 April 1940	sunk on 17 October 1941 by U-553
Gloriosa	Flower	Royal Navy	925		
Gloxinia	Flower	Royal Navy	925	22 August 1940	
Godetia (I)	Flower	Royal Navy	925	15 July 1940	sunk in collision 6 September 1940
Godetia (II)	Flower	Royal Navy	925	23 February 1942	
Guelph	Flower (modified)	Royal Canadian Navy	1,015	9 May 1944	27 June 1945
Halifax	Flower	Royal Canadian Navy	925	26 November 1941	paid off 12 July 1945
Harebell	Flower	Royal Navy	925		
Haste	Flower (modified)	United States Navy	1,015	6 April 1943	paid off 3 October 1945
Hawkesbury	Flower (modified)	Royal Canadian Navy	1,015	14 June 1944	10 July 1945
Heartsease	Flower	Royal Navy; United States Navy	925	4 June 1940	to USA 3 April 1942 as Courage, to UK 23 August 1945
Heather	Flower	Royal Navy	925	1 November 1940	
Heliotrope	Flower	Royal Navy; United States Navy	925	12 September 1940	to USA as Surprise 24 March 1942., to UK 26 August 1945
Hemlock	Flower	Royal Navy	925		
Hepatica	Flower	Royal Navy; Royal Canadian Navy	925	12 November 1940	to Canada 15 May 1941, paid off 27 June 1945
Hibiscus	Flower	Royal Navy; United States Navy	925	21 May 1940	to USA as Spry 2 May 1942, to UK 26 August 1945
Hollyhock	Flower	Royal Navy	925	19 November 1940	9 April 1942
Honesty	Flower (modified)	Royal Navy	1,015	28 May 1943	scrapped 1961
Honeysuckle	Flower	Royal Navy	925	14 September 1940	
Hyacinth	Flower	Royal Navy; Hellenic Navy	925	2 October 1940	to Greece as Apostolis 24 October 1943, out of service 1952
Hyderabad	Flower	Royal Navy	925	23 February 1942	
Hydrangea	Flower	Royal Navy	925	3 January 1941	
Intensity	Flower (modified)	United States Navy	1,015	31 March 1943	paid off 3 October 1945
Ivy	Flower	Royal Navy	925		
Jasmine	Flower	Royal Navy	925	16 May 1941	
Jonquil	Flower	Royal Navy	925	21 October 1940	
Kamloops	Flower	Royal Canadian Navy	925	17 March 1941	paid off 27 June 1945
Kamsack	Flower	Royal Canadian Navy	925	4 October 1941	paid off 22 July 1945
Kenogami	Flower	Royal Canadian Navy	925	29 June 1941	paid off 9 July 1945
Kingcup	Flower	Royal Navy	925	30 December 1940	
Kitchener	Flower	Royal Canadian Navy	925	28 June 1942	paid off 11 July 1945
La Bastiaise	Flower	French Navy	925	22 June 1940	22 June 1940
La Malbaie	Flower	Royal Canadian Navy	925	28 April 1942	paid off 28 June 1945
La Malouine	Flower	Royal Navy	925	29 July 1940	
Lachute	Flower (modified)	Royal Canadian Navy	1,015	26 October 1944	10 July 1945
Larkspur	Flower	Royal Navy; United States Navy	925	4 June 1940	to USA as Fury 17 March 1942, to UK on 22 August 1945.
Lavender	Flower	Royal Navy	925	16 May 1941	
Lethbridge	Flower	Royal Canadian Navy	925	25 June 1941	paid off 23 July 1945
Levis	Flower	Royal Canadian Navy	925	16 May 1941	sunk 19 September 1941 by U-74
Linaria	Flower (modified)	Royal Navy	1,015	19 June 1943	paid off 15 January 1948
Lindsay	Flower (modified)	Royal Canadian Navy	1,015	15 November 1943	18 July 1945
Ling	Flower	Royal Navy	925		
Lobelia	Flower	French Navy	925	16 July 1941	April 1947
Long Branch	Flower (modified)	Royal Canadian Navy	1,015	5 January 1944	17 June 1945
Loosestrife	Flower	Royal Navy	925	25 November 1941	
Lotus	Flower	Royal Navy	925	23 May 1942	
Louisburg (I)	Flower	Royal Canadian Navy	925	2 October 1941	sunk on 6 February 1943 by Luftwaffe aircraft
Louisburg (II)	Flower (modified)	Royal Canadian Navy	1,015	13 December 1943	25 June 1945
Lunenburg	Flower	Royal Canadian Navy	925	4 December 1941	paid off 23 July 1945
Madras	Bathurst	Royal Indian Navy	1,025	12 May 1942	Decommissioned 1960
Mallow	Flower	Royal Navy; Royal Yugoslav Navy	925	2 July 1940	Loaned to the Royal Yugoslav Navy on 11 January 1944 and renamed Nada, returned in 1949
Marguerite	Flower	Royal Navy	925	20 November 1940	
Marigold	Flower	Royal Navy	925	28 February 1941	9 December 1942
Marjoram	Flower	Royal Navy	925		
Matapedia	Flower	Royal Canadian Navy	925	9 May 1941	paid off 16 June 1945
Mayflower	Flower	Royal Navy; Royal Canadian Navy	925	28 November 1940	to Canada 15 May 1941, paid off 31 May 1945
Meadowsweet	Flower	Royal Navy	925	8 July 1942	
Merrittonia	Flower (modified)	Royal Canadian Navy	1,015	10 November 1944	11 July 1945
Midland	Flower	Royal Canadian Navy	925	17 November 1941	paid off 15 July 1945
Might	Flower (modified)	United States Navy	1,015	22 December 1942	9 October 1945
Mignonette	Flower	Royal Navy	925	7 May 1941	
Mimico	Flower (modified)	Royal Canadian Navy	1,015	8 February 1944	18 July 1945
Mimosa	Flower	French Navy	925	11 May 1941	9 June 1942
Moncton	Flower	Royal Canadian Navy	925	24 April 1942	paid off 12 December 1945
Monkshood	Flower	Royal Navy	925	31 July 1941	
Montbretia	Flower	Royal Norwegian Navy	925	29 September 1941	sunk 18 November 1942 by U-262
Moose Jaw	Flower	Royal Canadian Navy	925	19 June 1941	paid off 8 July 1945
Morden	Flower	Royal Canadian Navy	925	6 September 1941	paid off 29 June 1945
Myosotis	Flower	Royal Navy	925	30 May 1941	
Nanaimo	Flower	Royal Canadian Navy	925	26 April 1941	paid off 28 September 1945
Napanee	Flower	Royal Canadian Navy	925	12 May 1941	paid off 12 July 1945
Narcissus	Flower	Royal Navy	925	17 July 1941	
Nasturtium	Flower	Royal Navy	925	26 September 1940	
New Westminster	Flower	Royal Canadian Navy	925	31 January 1942	paid off 21 June 1945
Nigella	Flower	Royal Navy	925	25 February 1941	
Norsyd	Flower (modified)	Royal Canadian Navy	1,015	22 December 1943	25 June 1945
North Bay	Flower (modified)	Royal Canadian Navy	1,015	25 October 1943	5 June 1945
Oakville	Flower	Royal Canadian Navy	925	18 November 1941	paid off 20 July 1945
Orchis	Flower	Royal Navy	925	29 November 1940	21 August 1944
Orillia	Flower	Royal Canadian Navy	925	25 November 1940	paid off 2 July 1945
Owen Sound	Flower (modified)	Royal Canadian Navy	1,015	17 November 1943	19 July 1945
Oxlip	Flower	Royal Navy	925	28 December 1941	
Parry Sound	Flower (modified)	Royal Canadian Navy	1,015	30 August 1944	10 July 1945
Pennywort	Flower	Royal Navy	925	5 March 1942	
Pentstemon	Flower	Royal Navy	925	31 July 1941	
Peony	Flower	Royal Navy; Hellenic Navy	925	2 August 1940	to Greece as Sachtouris 1943, scrapped 1952
Periwinkle	Flower	Royal Navy; United States Navy	925	8 April 1940	to USA as Restless 15 March 1942, to UK 26 August 1945
Pert	Flower (modified)	United States Navy	1,015	23 July 1943	3 October 1945
Peterborough	Flower (modified)	Royal Canadian Navy	1,015	1 June 1944	19 July 1945
Petunia	Flower	Royal Navy	925	13 January 1941	
Phlox	Flower	Royal Navy	925	May 1942	
Picotee	Flower	Royal Navy	925	5 September 1940	sunk on 12 August 1941 by U-568
Pictou	Flower	Royal Canadian Navy	925	29 April 1941	paid off 12 July 1945
Pimpernel	Flower	Royal Navy	925	9 January 1941	
Pink	Flower	Royal Navy	925	2 July 1942	declared total loss after 27 June 1944 in attack by U-988
Polyanthus	Flower	Royal Navy	925	24 April 1941	sunk on 21 September 1943 by U-952
Poppy	Flower	Royal Navy	925	12 May 1942	
Port Arthur	Flower	Royal Canadian Navy	925	26 May 1942	paid off 11 July 1945
Potentilla	Flower	Royal Navy; Royal Norwegian Navy	925	16 January 1942	to Norway 16 January 1942, to RN 13 March 1944
Prescott	Flower	Royal Canadian Navy	925	26 June 1941	paid off 20 July 1945
Primrose	Flower	Royal Navy	925	15 July 1940	
Primula	Flower	Royal Navy	925	27 August 1940	
Prudent	Flower (modified)	United States Navy	1,015	16 August 1943	11 October 1945
Punjab	Bathurst	Royal Indian Navy	1,025	20 March 1942	Decommissioned 1949
Quesnel	Flower	Royal Canadian Navy	925	23 May 1941	paid off 3 July 1945
Ranunculus	Flower	Royal Navy	925		
Regina	Flower	Royal Canadian Navy	925	22 January 1942	sunk on 8 August 1944 by U-667
Renoncule	Flower	French Navy	925	28 July 1941	1947
Rhododendron	Flower	Royal Navy	925	18 October 1940	
Rimouski	Flower	Royal Canadian Navy	925	26 April 1941	paid off 24 July 1945
Riviere du Loup	Flower (modified)	Royal Canadian Navy	1,015	21 November 1943	2 July 1945
Rockrose	Flower	Royal Navy	925	4 November 1941	
Rose	Flower	Royal Norwegian Navy	925	31 October 1941	to Norway 31 October 1941, sunk 26 October 1944 by Manners
Rosebay	Flower (modified)	Royal Navy	1,015	28 July 1943	paid off 20 March 1946
Roselys	Flower	French Navy	925	19 September 1941	1947
Rosthern	Flower	Royal Canadian Navy	925	17 June 1941	paid off 19 July 1945
Sackville	Flower	Royal Canadian Navy	925	30 December 1941	paid off 8 April 1946; now a museum ship in Halifax, NS, Canada
Salvia	Flower	Royal Navy	925	20 September 1940	sunk on 24 December 1941 by U-568
Samphire	Flower	Royal Navy	925	30 June 1941	30 January 1943
Saskatoon	Flower	Royal Canadian Navy	925	9 June 1941	paid off 25 June 1945
Saxifrage	Flower	Royal Navy	925	6 February 1942	
Shawinigan	Flower	Royal Canadian Navy	925	19 September 1941	sunk 25 November 1944
Shediac	Flower	Royal Canadian Navy	925	8 July 1941	paid off 28 August 1945
Sherbrooke	Flower	Royal Canadian Navy	925	5 June 1941	paid off 28 June 1945
Smilax	Flower (modified)	Royal Navy	1,015	21 June 1943	paid off 9 October 1945
Smiths Falls	Flower (modified)	Royal Canadian Navy	1,015	28 November 1944	8 July 1945
Snowberry	Flower	Royal Canadian Navy	925	26 November 1940	paid off 8 June 1945
Snowdrop	Flower	Royal Navy	925	30 July 1941	
Snowflake	Flower	Royal Navy	925	2 November 1941	
Sorel	Flower	Royal Canadian Navy	925	19 August 1941	paid off 22 June 1945
Spikenard	Flower	Royal Navy; Royal Canadian Navy	925	6 December 1940	to Canada 15 May 1941, sunk on 11 February 1942 by U-136
Spiraea	Flower	Royal Navy	925	27 February 1941	
St. Lambert	Flower (modified)	Royal Canadian Navy	1,015	27 May 1944	20 July 1945
Starwort	Flower	Royal Navy	925	26 May 1941	
Statice	Flower (modified)	Royal Navy	1,015	20 September 1943	paid off May 1947
Stellarton	Flower (modified)	Royal Canadian Navy	1,015	29 September 1944	1 July 1945
Stonecrop	Flower	Royal Navy	925	30 July 1941	
Strathroy	Flower (modified)	Royal Canadian Navy	1,015	20 November 1944	12 July 1945
Sudbury	Flower	Royal Canadian Navy	925	15 October 1941	paid off 28 August 1945
Summerside	Flower	Royal Canadian Navy	925	11 September 1941	paid off 6 July 1945
Sundew	Flower	Royal Navy	925		
Sunflower	Flower	Royal Navy	925	25 January 1941	
Sweetbriar	Flower	Royal Navy	925	8 September 1941	
Tamarisk	Flower	Royal Navy; Hellenic Navy	925	November 1943	to Greece as Tombazis November 1943. scrapped 1952
The Pas	Flower	Royal Canadian Navy	925	21 October 1941	paid off 24 July 1945
Thorlock	Flower (modified)	Royal Canadian Navy	1,015	13 November 1944	15 July 1945
Thyme	Flower	Royal Navy	925	23 October 1941	
Timmins	Flower	Royal Canadian Navy	925	10 February 1942	paid off 15 July 1945
Trail	Flower	Royal Canadian Navy	925	30 April 1941	paid off 17 July 1945
Trentonian	Flower (modified)	Royal Canadian Navy	1,015	1 December 1943	sunk 22 February 1945 by U-1004
Trillium	Flower	Royal Canadian Navy	925	31 October 1940	paid off 27 June 1945
Tulip	Flower	Royal Navy	925	18 November 1940	
Vancouver	Flower	Royal Canadian Navy	925	20 March 1942	paid off 26 June 1945
Verbena	Flower	Royal Navy	925	19 December 1940	
Veronica	Flower	Royal Navy; United States Navy	925	18 February 1941	To USA as Temptress 16 February 1942, to UK 26 August 1945
Vervain	Flower	Royal Navy	925	9 June 1941	20 February 1945
Vetch	Flower	Royal Navy	925	11 August 1941	
Ville de Quebec	Flower	Royal Canadian Navy	925	24 May 1942	Paid off 6 July 1945
Violet	Flower	Royal Navy	925	3 February 1941	10 February 1946
Wallflower	Flower	Royal Navy	925	7 March 1941	
West York	Flower (modified)	Royal Canadian Navy	1,015	6 October 1944	9 July 1945
Wetaskiwin	Flower	Royal Canadian Navy	925	17 December 1940	Paid off 19 June 1945
Weyburn	Flower	Royal Canadian Navy	925	26 November 1941	Sunk by Mine near Gibraltar February 1943
Whitby	Flower (modified)	Royal Canadian Navy	1,015	6 June 1944	16 July 1945
Willowherb	Flower (modified)	Royal Navy	1,015	30 August 1943	Paid off 11 June 1946
Windflower	Flower	Royal Navy; Royal Canadian Navy	925	20 October 1940	To Canada 15 May 1941, sunk 7 December 1941
Woodruff	Flower	Royal Navy	925	7 April 1941	
Woodstock	Flower	Royal Canadian Navy	925	1 May 1942	paid off 27 January 1945
Zinnia	Flower	Royal Navy	925	30 March 1941	sunk 23 August 1941 by U-564
