= American Flower-class corvette =

1942 American type of warship

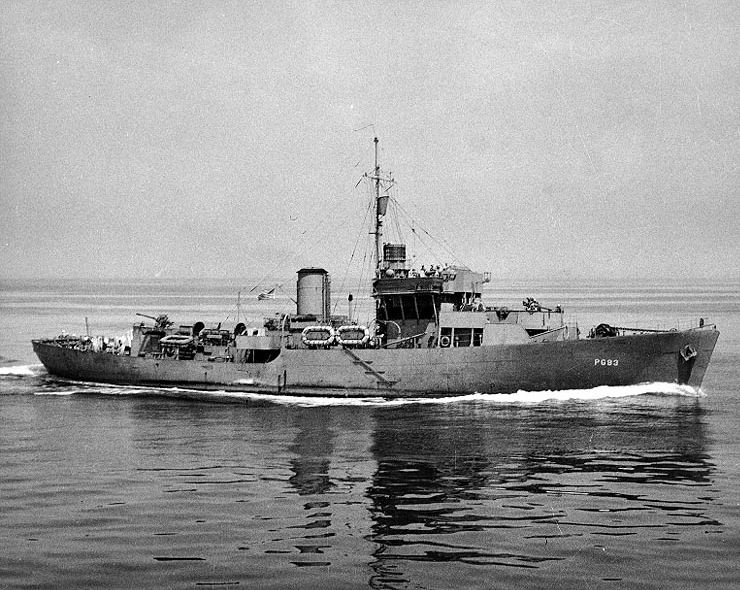
- USS Intensity (PG-93), ex-HMS Milfoil, in 1943

Class overview
- Name: Flower class
- Operators: During World War II (Allies): Royal Navy; United States Navy; After World War II: Royal Navy; United States Navy; Italian Navy
- Completed: 10 (original), 15 (modified)
- Lost: none during World War II

The American Flower-class corvettes were those ships of the Royal Navy's Flower class built for, or operated by, the United States Navy during World War II. These were ten ships of the original Flower class, known as the Temptress class in US service, and fifteen Modified Flowers, as the Action class. In US service they were classified as Patrol Gunboats (PG).

== Construction history ==
In December 1941, after the US entry into World War II, the USN had a large building programme for anti-submarine warfare (ASW) ships, but none nearing completion. To overcome this shortfall, the Royal Navy agreed to transfer a number of ASW ships to the USN, including ten Flower-class corvettes. These ships had already been in commission and had seen action during the Battle of the Atlantic.

These ships were classified as Patrol Gunboats, and numbered PG 62 to 71, and were referred to as the Temptress class, after the first ship to be recommissioned.

The USN also placed orders for 15 more Flowers from Canadian shipyards. This was met by transferring a number of vessels on order for the RN to USN. These ships were of the Modified Flower type, a design which consolidated the various modifications developed in the course of building the original Flowers.

In the event the USN only took charge of eight of these ships; the other seven were transferred back to the RN under Lend-Lease arrangements.

The US ships were numbered PG 86 to 100 and were referred to as the Action class.

The Temptress class were armed with a 4-inch gun forward, a 3 in (76 mm)/50 dual-purpose (DP) gun aft, two 20 mm anti-aircraft guns, two depth charge racks, and four depth charge throwers. The Action class replaced the 4-inch gun with another 3-inch/50 cal. DP gun, and added a Hedgehog anti-submarine mortar.

== Temptress class ==
The ten ships of the Temptress class were originally built for the Royal Navy and saw service there before transfer to the USN.

Construction data
USN name	Number	RN name	Pennant	Builder	Completed	Transferred	Fate
USS Temptress	PG-62	HMS Veronica	K37	Smiths Dock Co., South Bank-on-Tees	18 Feb 1941	16 Feb 1942	Returned to RN 26 Aug 1945
USS Surprise	PG-63	HMS Heliotrope	K03	John Crown & Sons Ltd, Sunderland	12 Sept 1940	24 Mar 1942	Returned to RN 26 Aug 1945
USS Spry	PG-64	HMS Hibiscus	K24	Harland & Wolff Ltd., Belfast	21 May 1940	2 May 1942	Returned to RN 26 Aug 1945
USS Saucy	PG-65	HMS Arabis	K73	Harland & Wolff Ltd., Belfast	5 Apr 1940	30 Apr 1942	Returned to RN 26 Aug 1945 and recommissioned as Snapdragon
USS Restless	PG-66	HMS Periwinkle	K55	Harland & Wolff Ltd., Belfast	8 Apr 1940	15 Mar 1942	Returned to RN 26 Aug 1945
USS Ready	PG-67	HMS Calendula	K28	Harland & Wolff Ltd., Belfast	6 May 1940	12 Mar 1942	Returned to RN 23 Aug 1945
USS Impulse	PG-68	HMS Begonia	K66	Cook, Welton & Gemmell, Beverley	8 Mar 1941	10 Mar 1942	Returned to RN 22 Aug 1945
USS Fury	PG-69	HMS Larkspur	K82	Fleming & Ferguson Ltd., Paisley	4 Jan 1941	17 Mar 1942	Returned to RN 22 Aug 1945
USS Courage	PG-70	HMS Heartsease	K15	Harland & Wolff Ltd., Belfast	4 Jun 1940	3 Apr 1942	Returned to RN 23 Aug 1945
USS Tenacity	PG-71	HMS Candytuft	K09	Grangemouth Dry Dock Co., Grangemouth	16 Oct 1940	4 Mar 1942	Returned to RN 26 Aug 1945

== Action class ==
The fifteen ships of the Action class were originally ordered for the Royal Navy but transferred before completion to the United States Navy. On completion eight entered service with the USN while the other seven were transferred back to the RN under Lend-lease.

=== Served in USN ===
Action-class ships transferred to the US Navy
USN name	Number	RN name	Pennant	Builder	Completed	To USN	Fate
USS Action	PG-86	HMS Comfrey	K277	Collingwood Shipyards Ltd., Collingwood	22 Nov 1942	22 Nov 1942	Sold 6 Feb 1946
USS Alacrity	PG-87	HMS Cornel	K278	Collingwood Shipyards Ltd., Collingwood	10 Dec 1942	10 Dec 1942	Sold 22 Sept 1945
USS Brisk	PG-89	HMS Flax	K284	Kingston Shipbuilding Co. Ltd., Kingston	6 Dec 1942	6 Dec 1942	Sold 18 Oct 1946
USS Haste	PG-92	HMS Mandrake	K287	Midland Shipyards Ltd., Midland	6 Apr 1943	6 Apr 1943	Sold 1949
USS Intensity	PG-93	HMS Milfoil	K288	Midland Shipyards Ltd., Midland	31 Mar 1943	31 Mar 1943	Sold
USS Might	PG-94	HMS Musk	K289	Midland Shipyards Ltd., Midland	22 Dec 1942	22 Dec 1942	Sold
USS Pert	PG-95	HMS Nepeta	K290	Midland Shipyards Ltd., Midland	22 Dec 1942	22 Dec 1942	Sold 18 Oct 1946
USS Prudent	PG-96	HMS Privet	K291	Midland Shipyards Ltd., Midland	16 Aug 1943	16 Aug 1943	Sold 1949

=== Transferred to RN ===
Action-class ships of the US Navy returned to the Royal Navy
USN name	Number	RN name	Pennant	Builder	Completed	To RN	Fate
USS Beacon	PG-88	HMS Dittany	K279	Collingwood Shipyards Ltd., Collingwood	31 May 1943	same day	Returned to USN 20 Jun 1946
USS Caprice	PG-90	HMS Honesty	K285	Kingston Shipbuilding Co. Ltd., Kingston	28 Mar 1943	28 Mar 1943	Returned to USN 20 Jun 1946
USS Clash	PG-91	HMS Linaria	K282	Midland Shipyards Ltd., Midland	19 Jun 1943	19 Jun 1943	Returned to USN 27 Jul 1946
USS Splendor	PG-97	HMS Rosebay	K286	Collingwood Shipyards Ltd., Collingwood			Returned to USN 20 Mar 1946
USS Tact	PG-98	HMS Smilax	K280	Collingwood Shipyards Ltd., Collingwood	21 Jun 1943	21 Jun 1943	Returned to USN 5 Jan 1946
USS Vim	PG-99	HMS Statice	K281	Collingwood Shipyards Ltd., Collingwood	20 Sep 1943	20 Sep 1943	Returned to USN 21 Jun 1946
USS Vitality	PG-100	HMS Willowherb	K283	Midland Shipyards Ltd., Midland	30 Aug 1943	30 Aug 1943	Returned to USN 11 Jun 1946
