= HMCS Charlottetown (1943) =

River-class frigate

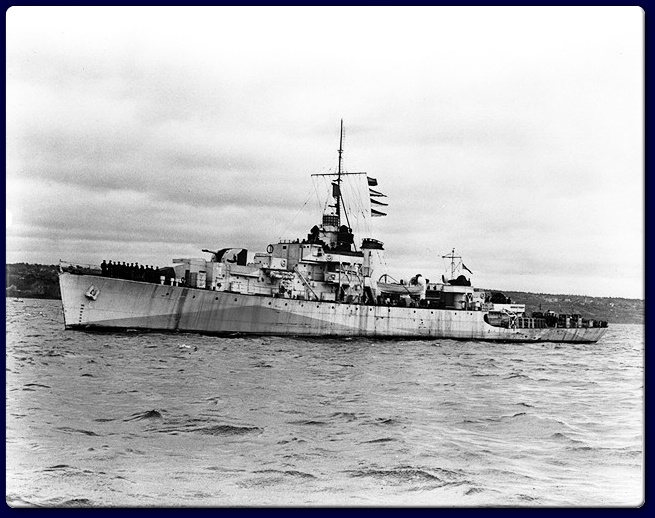

History

Canada
- Name: Charlottetown
- Namesake: Charlottetown, Prince Edward Island
- Ordered: June 1942
- Builder: Davie Shipbuilding, Lauzon
- Yard number: 23
- Laid down: 26 January 1943
- Launched: 16 September 1943
- Commissioned: 28 April 1944
- Decommissioned: 25 March 1947
- Identification: pennant number:K 244
- Honours and awards: Atlantic, 1942; Gulf of St. Lawrence, 1942, 1944.
- Fate: Sold 1947, hull expended as breakwater in British Columbia.

General characteristics
- Class & type: River-class frigate
- Displacement: 1,445 long tons (1,468 t; 1,618 short tons); 2,110 long tons (2,140 t; 2,360 short tons) (deep load)
- Length: 283 ft (86.26 m) p/p; 301.25 ft (91.82 m) o/a
- Beam: 36.5 ft (11.13 m)
- Draught: 9 ft (2.74 m); 13 ft (3.96 m) (deep load)
- Propulsion: 2 × Admiralty 3-drum boilers, 2 shafts, reciprocating vertical triple expansion, 5,500 ihp (4,100 kW)
- Speed: 20 knots (37.0 km/h); 20.5 knots (38.0 km/h) (turbine ships)
- Range: 646 long tons (656 t; 724 short tons) oil fuel; 7,500 nautical miles (13,890 km) at 15 knots (27.8 km/h)
- Complement: 157
- Armament: 2 × QF 4 in (102 mm)/45 Mk. XVI on twin mount HA/LA Mk.XIX; 1 × QF 12 pdr (3 in (76 mm)) 12 cwt /40 Mk. V on mounting HA/LA Mk.IX (not all ships); 8 × 20 mm QF Oerlikon A/A on twin mounts Mk.V; 1 × Hedgehog 24 spigot A/S projector; up to 150 depth charges

HMCS Charlottetown was a River-class frigate that served with the Royal Canadian Navy (RCN) during the Second World War. She was the second vessel of the name, HMCS Charlottetown having been a Flower-class corvette that had been sunk earlier in the war. They are unique for being the only two ships to have shared the same pennant number, K 244. She was named for Charlottetown, Prince Edward Island.

Charlottetown was ordered in June 1942 as part of the 1942-1943 River-class building program. She was laid down on 26 January 1943 by G T Davie Shipbuilding Ltd. at Lauzon and launched on 16 September of that year. She was commissioned into the RCN at Quebec City on 28 April 1944. She visited her namesake city of Charlottetown on 22 May en route to Halifax.

== Background ==
The River-class frigate was designed by William Reed of Smith's Dock Company of South Bank-on-Tees. Originally called a "twin-screw corvette", its purpose was to improve on the convoy escort classes in service with the Royal Navy at the time, including the Flower-class corvette. The first orders were placed by the Royal Navy in 1940 and the vessels were named for rivers in the United Kingdom, giving name to the class. In Canada they were named for towns and cities though they kept the same designation. The name "frigate" was suggested by Vice-Admiral Percy Nelles of the Royal Canadian Navy and was adopted later that year.

Improvements over the corvette design included improved accommodation which was markedly better. The twin engines gave only three more knots of speed but extended the range of the ship to nearly double that of a corvette at 7,200 nautical miles (13,300 km) at 12 knots (22 km/h). Among other lessons applied to the design was an armament package better designed to combat U-boats including a twin 4-inch (102 mm) mount forward and a 12-pounder gun aft. 15 Canadian frigates were initially fitted with a single 4-inch gun forward but with the exception of HMCS Valleyfield, they were all eventually upgraded to the double mount. For underwater targets, the River-class frigate was equipped with a Hedgehog anti-submarine mortar and depth charge rails aft and four side-mounted throwers.

River-class frigates were the first Royal Canadian Navy warships to carry the 147B Sword horizontal fan echo sonar transmitter in addition to the irregular ASDIC. This allowed the ship to maintain contact with targets even while firing unless a target was struck. Improved radar and direction-finding equipment improved the RCN's ability to find and track enemy submarines over the previous classes.

Canada originally ordered the construction of 33 frigates in October 1941. The design was too big for the shipyards on the Great Lakes so all the frigates built in Canada were built in dockyards along the west coast or along the St. Lawrence River. In all Canada ordered the construction of 60 frigates including ten for the Royal Navy that transferred two to the United States Navy.

== Service history ==
Charlottetown proceeded to Bermuda on 18 June for a 1-month work-up period for her new crew. She returned to Halifax and was assigned to convoy escort group EG 16. EG 16 moved from Halifax to Derry, Northern Ireland on 7 March 1945 and later Portsmouth, England. Charlottetown escorted two convoys to and from Gibraltar and left Derry in mid-June for HMCS Protector in Sydney where she completed a tropicalization refit in preparation for service with Operation Downfall in the Pacific War. She completed the refit in Halifax on 28 February 1946 after the Surrender of Japan and left on 3 March for new duties at Esquimalt. She spent the rest of 1946 training crew with the University Naval Training Divisions at the Royal Canadian Naval College in Royal Roads.

She was paid off from the RCN on 25 March 1947 at Esquimalt. She was sold the same year and scuttled for use as a breakwater at Oyster Bay, British Columbia.
