= HMCS Charlottetown (1941) =

Flower-class corvette

Coordinates: 49°10′N 66°50′W

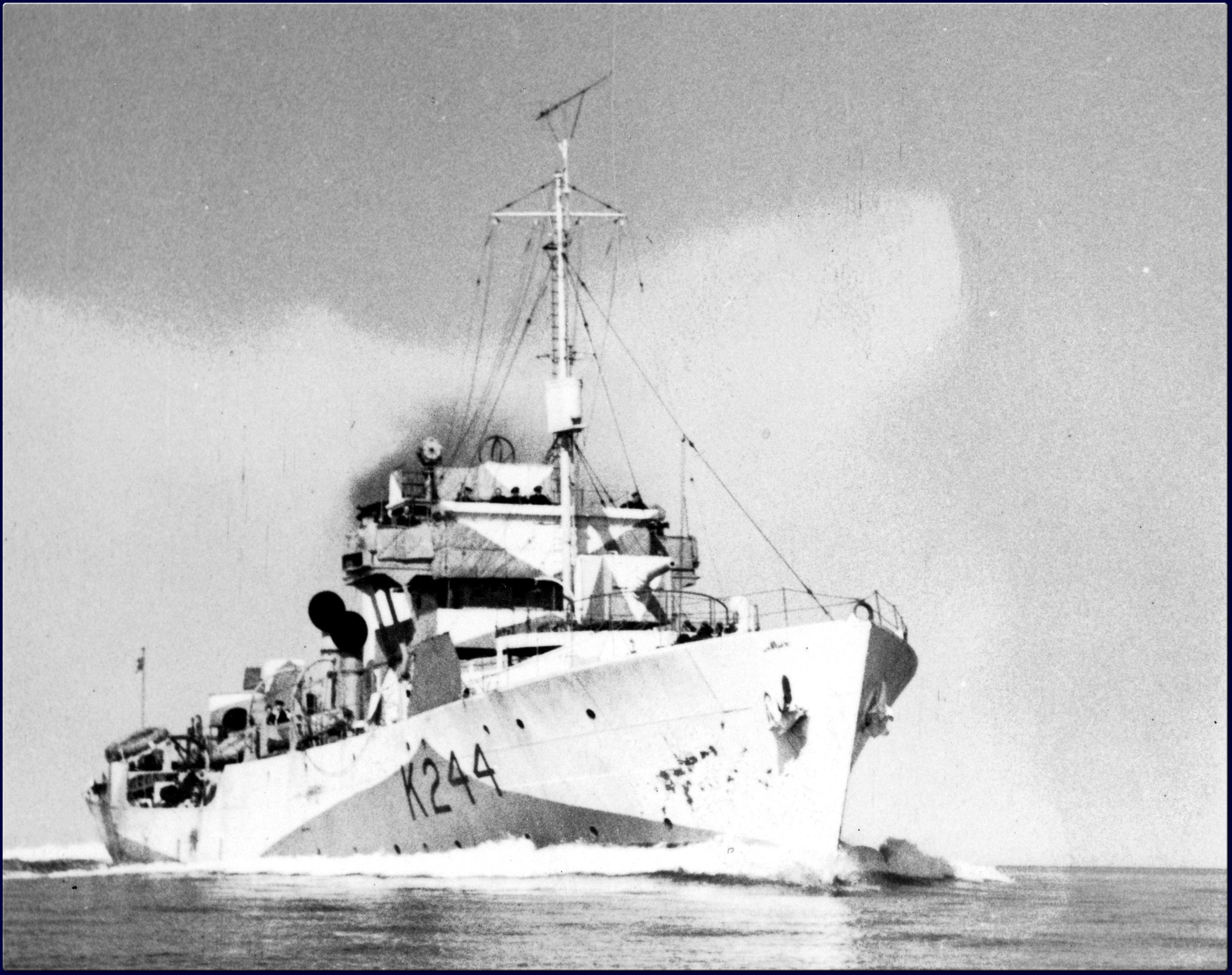

History

Canada
- Name: Charlottetown
- Namesake: Charlottetown, Prince Edward Island
- Builder: Kingston Shipbuilding Ltd., Kingston
- Laid down: 7 June 1941
- Launched: 10 September 1941
- Commissioned: 13 December 1941
- Home port: Halifax, Nova Scotia
- Identification: Pennant number: K244
- Honours and awards: Atlantic, 1942; Gulf of St. Lawrence, 1942.
- Fate: Torpedoed and sunk on 11 September 1942

General characteristics
- Class & type: Modified Flower-class corvette
- Displacement: 1,015 long tons (1,031 t; 1,137 short tons)
- Length: 208 ft (63.4 m)o/a
- Beam: 33 ft (10.1 m)
- Draught: 11 ft (3.35 m)
- Propulsion: single shaft; 2 × water tube boilers; 1 × 4-cylinder triple-expansion reciprocating steam engine; 2,750 ihp (2,050 kW)
- Speed: 16 knots (29.6 km/h)
- Range: 3,500 nautical miles (6,482 km) at 12 knots (22.2 km/h)
- Complement: 90
- Sensors & processing systems: 1 × Type 271 SW2C radar; 1 × Type 144 sonar
- Armament: 1 × 4 inch BL Mk.IX single gun; 1 × 2-pounder. Mk.VIII single "pom-pom" AA gun; 2 × 20 mm Oerlikon single; 1 × Hedgehog A/S mortar; 4 × Mk.II depth charge throwers; 2 depth charge rails with 70 depth charges

HMCS Charlottetown was a Flower-class corvette that served the Royal Canadian Navy during the Second World War. Charlottetown's pennant number K244 is unique in that it was also used for HMCS Charlottetown, a River-class frigate.

== Background ==
Flower-class corvettes like Charlottetown serving with the Royal Canadian Navy during the Second World War were different from earlier and more traditional sail-driven corvettes. The "corvette" designation was created by the French as a class of small warships; the Royal Navy borrowed the term for a period but discontinued its use in 1877. During the hurried preparations for war in the late 1930s, Winston Churchill reactivated the corvette class, needing a name for smaller ships used in an escort capacity, in this case based on a whaling ship design. The generic name "flower" was used to designate the class of these ships, which – in the Royal Navy – were named after flowering plants.

Corvettes commissioned by the Royal Canadian Navy during the Second World War were named after communities for the most part, to better represent the people who took part in building them. This idea was put forth by Admiral Percy W. Nelles. Sponsors were commonly associated with the community for which the ship was named. Royal Navy corvettes were designed as open sea escorts, while Canadian corvettes were developed for coastal auxiliary roles which was exemplified by their minesweeping gear. Eventually the Canadian corvettes would be modified for better performance on open seas.

== Construction ==
Charlottetown was laid down at Kingston Shipbuilding Ltd., Kingston on 7 June 1941 and launched on 10 September of that year. She was commissioned into the RCN at Quebec City on 13 December and arrived at her homeport of Halifax, Nova Scotia on 18 December 1941.

== Atlantic service ==
Charlottetown served with the Western Local Escort Force (WLEF) until mid-July 1942 when she was transferred to the Gulf Escort Force (GEF), serving in what is now referred to as the Battle of the St. Lawrence. She escorted Quebec City - Sydney convoys until her sinking.

=== Sinking ===
Charlottetown was torpedoed and sunk on 11 September 1942 by the U-517 6 nautical miles (11 km) off Cap Chat in the St. Lawrence River along the northern shore of the Gaspé Peninsula. She had been returning to base with the minesweeper HMCS Clayoquot after escorting convoy SQ-35 and was not zigzagging. She was struck aft by two torpedoes. She went down fast and though most of her crew got off the ship, some died in the water when her depth charges went off as she sank. Her captain, Lieutenant Commander John W. Bonner, RCNR and 8 other crew were killed out of her crew of 64. The survivors were picked up by Clayoquot.
