= HMCS Trentonian =

Modified Flower-class corvette

Coordinates: 50°06′N 04°50′W

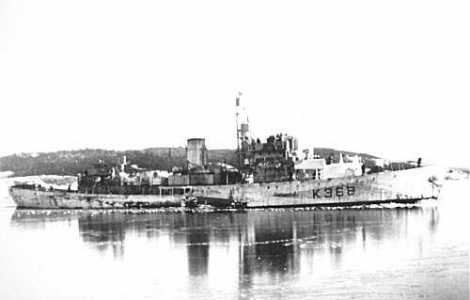
- HMCS Trentonian

History

Canada
- Name: HMCS Trentonian
- Namesake: Trenton, Ontario
- Ordered: April 1942
- Builder: Kingston Shipbuilding Co., Kingston
- Laid down: 19 February 1943
- Launched: 1 September 1943
- Commissioned: 1 December 1943
- Decommissioned: 22 February 1945
- Identification: Pennant number: K368
- Honours and awards: Atlantic 1944, English Channel 1944–45
- Fate: Sunk 22 February 1945

General characteristics
- Class & type: Flower-class corvette (modified)
- Displacement: 1,015 long tons (1,031 t; 1,137 short tons)
- Length: 208 ft (63.40 m)o/a
- Beam: 33 ft (10.06 m)
- Draught: 11 ft (3.35 m)
- Propulsion: single shaft; 2 × oil fired water tube boilers; 1 triple-expansion reciprocating steam engine; 2,750 ihp (2,050 kW)
- Speed: 16 knots (29.6 km/h)
- Range: 7,400 nautical miles (13,705 km) at 10 knots (18.5 km/h)
- Complement: 90
- Sensors & processing systems: 1 Type 271 SW2C radar; 1 Type 144 sonar
- Armament: 1 × 4 in (102 mm) QF Mk XIX naval gun; 2 x 20 mm Oerlikon twin; 4 × 20 mm Oerlikon single; 1 × Hedgehog A/S mortar; 4 × Mk.II depth charge throwers; 2 × Depth charge rails with 70 depth charges

HMCS Trentonian was a modified Flower-class corvette that served with the Royal Canadian Navy during the Second World War. She fought primarily in the Battle of the Atlantic and the English Channel as a convoy escort. She was named for Trenton, Ontario, though due to a naming conflict with a US Navy vessel, her name was modified. She was sunk in 1945.

== Background ==
Flower-class corvettes like Trentonian serving with the Royal Canadian Navy during the Second World War were different from earlier and more traditional sail-driven corvettes. The "corvette" designation was created by the French as a class of small warships; the Royal Navy borrowed the term for a period but discontinued its use in 1877. During the hurried preparations for war in the late 1930s, Winston Churchill reactivated the corvette class, needing a name for smaller ships used in an escort capacity, in this case based on a whaling ship design. The generic name "flower" was used to designate the class of these ships, which – in the Royal Navy – were named after flowering plants.

Corvettes commissioned by the Royal Canadian Navy during the Second World War were named after communities for the most part, to better represent the people who took part in building them. This idea was put forth by Admiral Percy W. Nelles. Sponsors were commonly associated with the community for which the ship was named. Royal Navy corvettes were designed as open sea escorts, while Canadian corvettes were developed for coastal auxiliary roles which was exemplified by their minesweeping gear. Eventually the Canadian corvettes would be modified to allow them to perform better on the open seas.

== Construction ==
Trentonian was ordered April 1942 as part of the 1942–43 modified Flower-class building programme. This programme was known as the Increased Endurance. Many changes were made, all from lessons that had been learned in previous versions of the Flower class. The bridge was made a full deck higher and built to naval standards instead of the more civilian-like bridges of previous versions. The platform for the 4-inch main gun was raised to minimize the amount of spray over it and to provide a better field of fire. It was also connected to the wheelhouse by a wide platform that was now the base for the Hedgehog anti-submarine mortar that this version was armed with. Along with the new Hedgehog, this version got the new QF 4-inch Mk XIX main gun, which was semi-automatic, used fixed ammunition and had the ability to elevate higher giving it an anti-aircraft ability.

Other superficial changes to this version include an upright funnel and pressurized boiler rooms which eliminated the need for hooded ventilators around the base of the funnel. This changes the silhouette of the corvette and made it more difficult for submariners to tell which way the corvette was laying.

Trentonian was laid down by Kingston Shipbuilding Co. at Kingston, Ontario 19 February 1943 and was launched 1 September later that year. She was commissioned into the Royal Canadian Navy 1 December 1943 at Kingston.

== Service history ==
After working up, Trentonian was assigned to Western Approaches Command in March 1944 in preparation for duties in association with Operation Neptune, the naval component of the Allied invasion of Normandy. The ship arrived at Portsmouth 8 June 1944 remaining there at anchor until the night of 11 June when the ship was to take up escort duties in the early hours of 12 June for the cable ships HMTS Monarch, HMS St. Margarets, and the cable barge Norman, engaged in laying vital communications cable to Normandy. (Note: His Majesty's Telegraph Ship Monarch, built 1916, was sunk in 1945. The cable ship HMS St. Margarets was built 1944 and newly commissioned. (Imperial War Museum Photo as HMS St. Margarets) Critical cable communications to Normandy were delayed by severe damage to Monarch.) By 1600 on 12 June St. Margarets had completed laying and buoyed the cable for Monarch to pick up and continue the lay to Normandy with only Trentonian in company.

Two United States destroyers, Plunkett and Davis, picked up the cable ship and escort on radar. The destroyers fired star shell and Plunkett flashed challenges. Monarch had been ordered to follow, but not respond, to a shore signal on a bearing then occupied by Plunkett though it is not known if the cable ship observed the challenge and had no recognition signal book aboard. It was the duty of Trentonian as escort to reply to such challenges but Plunkett used a directional lamp and it was apparently not seen by the escort. After one minute without response Plunkett opened fire on Monarch. Trentonian turned on recognition lights and then all ship's lights but the fire continued. Monarch was hit and severely damaged with loss of two dead and some thirty crew wounded. The destroyer's fire was shifted to Trentonian before it ceased fire. Trentonian proceeded to Monarch rescuing men thrown overboard and treating wounded. A board in inquiry later found Plunkett had perhaps been too quick to open fire but no blame could be attached. The court martial the captain of Trentonian had demanded was not held and the crews of the target ships were held to secrecy. Trentonian was not hit, though some shells came close, while another report indicated some damage when a shell, which was a dud, penetrated the outer hull and passed through the ship.

=== Sinking ===
Newspaper article about the sinking

In late August 1944 Trentonian transferred to Plymouth Command and was made part of escort group EG 41. While with this unit her primary duties were escorting Channel convoys. On 22 February 1945, while escorting a Channel convoy she was torpedoed by U-1004 near Falmouth. There were six casualties.
