= HMCS Sudbury =

Flower-class corvette

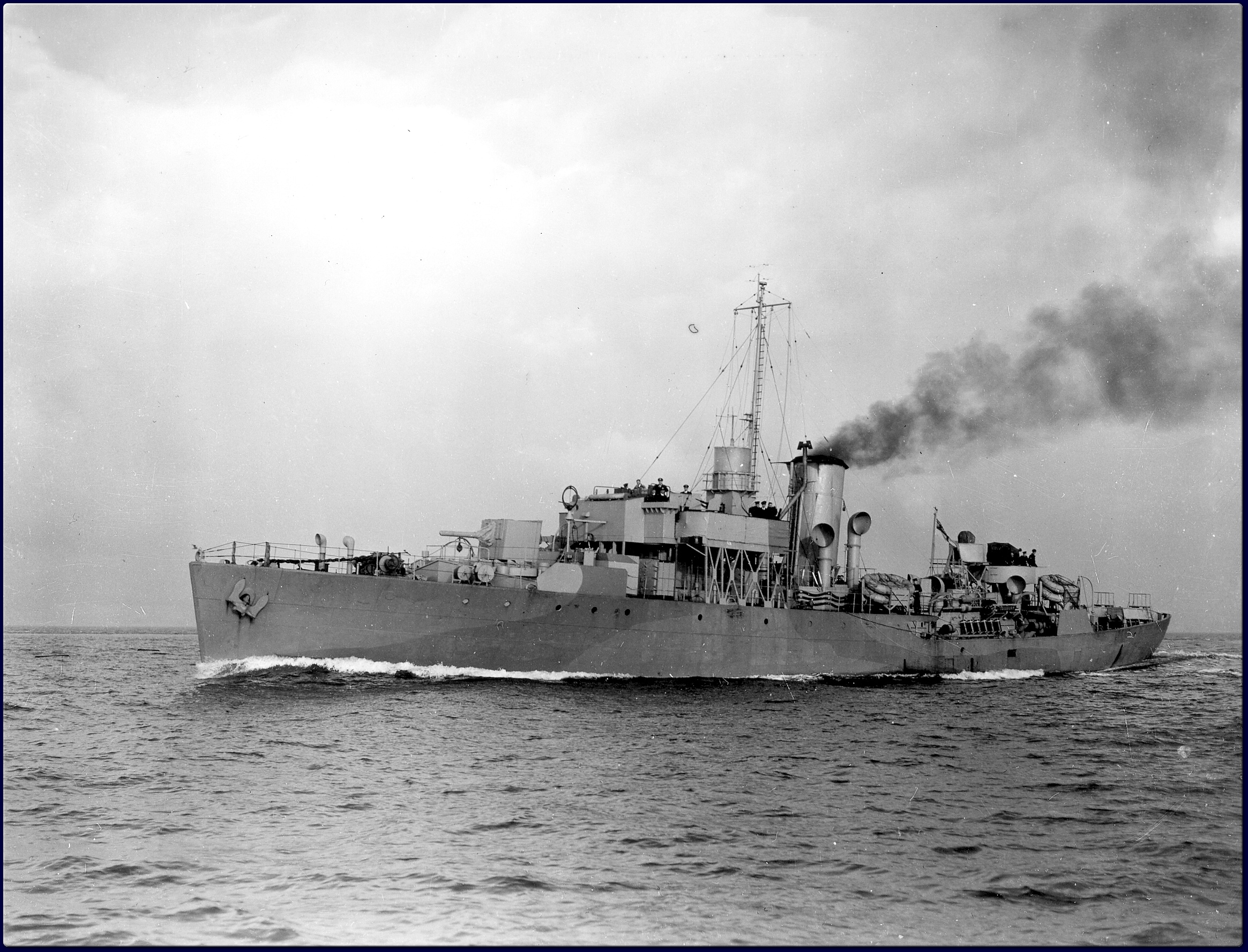
- HMCS Sudbury at sea, circa 1944-1945. This photograph was taken after the May 1944 completion of the refit that included a forecastle extension.

History

Canada
- Name: Sudbury
- Namesake: Sudbury, Ontario
- Ordered: 7 February 1940
- Builder: Kingston Shipbuilding Ltd., Kingston
- Laid down: 25 January 1941
- Launched: 31 May 1941
- Commissioned: 15 October 1941
- Decommissioned: 28 August 1945
- Identification: Pennant number: K162
- Honours and awards: Atlantic 1941-44
- Fate: Sold in 1949 as mercantile Sudbury. Scrapped in 1967.

General characteristics
- Class & type: Flower-class corvette (original)
- Displacement: 925 long tons (940 t; 1,036 short tons)
- Length: 205 ft (62.48 m)o/a
- Beam: 33 ft (10.06 m)
- Draught: 11.5 ft (3.51 m)
- Propulsion: single shaft; 2 × water tube boilers; 1 × 4-cycle triple-expansion reciprocating steam engine; 2,750 ihp (2,050 kW)
- Speed: 16 knots (29.6 km/h)
- Range: 3,500 nautical miles (6,482 km) at 12 knots (22.2 km/h)
- Complement: 85
- Sensors & processing systems: 1 × SW1C or 2C radar; 1 × Type 123A or Type 127DV sonar
- Armament: 1 × BL 4 in (102 mm) Mk.IX gun; 2 × .50 cal machine gun (twin); 2 × Lewis .303 cal machine gun (twin); 2 × Mk.II depth charge throwers; 2 × depth charge rails with 40 depth charges; originally fitted with minesweeping gear, later removed

HMCS Sudbury was a Flower-class corvette that served the Royal Canadian Navy during the Second World War. She served primarily in the Battle of the Atlantic as a convoy escort. She was named for Sudbury, Ontario.

== Background ==
Flower-class corvettes like Sudbury serving with the Royal Canadian Navy during the Second World War were different from earlier and more traditional sail-driven corvettes. The "corvette" designation was created by the French as a class of small warships; the Royal Navy borrowed the term for a period but discontinued its use in 1877. During the hurried preparations for war in the late 1930s, Winston Churchill reactivated the corvette class, needing a name for smaller ships used in an escort capacity, in this case based on a whaling ship design. The generic name "flower" was used to designate the class of these ships, which – in the Royal Navy – were named after flowering plants.

Corvettes commissioned by the Royal Canadian Navy during the Second World War were named after communities for the most part, to better represent the people who took part in building them. This idea was put forth by Admiral Percy W. Nelles. Sponsors were commonly associated with the community for which the ship was named. Royal Navy corvettes were designed as open sea escorts, while Canadian corvettes were developed for coastal auxiliary roles which was exemplified by their minesweeping gear. Eventually the Canadian corvettes would be modified to allow them to perform better on the open seas.

== Construction ==
Sudbury was ordered 7 February 1940 as part of the 1939-1940 Flower-class building program. She was laid down by Kingston Shipbuilding Ltd. at Kingston on 25 January 1941 and launched on 31 May 1941. She was commissioned into the RCN on 15 October 1941 at Montreal, Quebec.

Sudbury underwent two significant refits during her service time. The first began in December 1942 at Liverpool, Nova Scotia and lasted two months. The second major overhaul took place at Esquimalt, British Columbia from February to 10 May 1944. During this refit Sudbury had her fo'c'sle extended.

== War service ==
After arriving at Halifax for deployment, she was initially assigned to Sydney Force. In January 1942 she joined Newfoundland Force for a brief period. In March 1942 she transferred to the Western Local Escort Force (WLEF).

When the U-boat threat spread to the North American coast and they began to target unescorted oil tankers, escorts were assigned to protect them against the menace. In June 1942, Sudbury was named as one of those escorts. In September 1942, she was placed under United States control and assigned to escort convoys between New York and Guantanamo until departing for refit in December.

After returning to service in June 1943, Sudbury rejoined WLEF as a member of escort group W-9. In September 1943, she was loaned to the Mid-Ocean Escort Force (MOEF) escort group C-5. Upon her return to WLEF, she resumed service with W-9 until January 1944.

In January 1944, Sudbury was reassigned to the Pacific coast and arrived in February, where she immediately underwent a major overhaul. After workups in May 1944, she joined Esquimalt Force and remained with them until the end of the war.

== Post-war service ==
Sudbury was paid off at Esquimalt 28 August 1945. She was sold for civilian use as a 892 GRT tugboat and entered service in 1949. The ship retained her name.

Sudbury entered civilian service and underwent several ownership changes by the early 1950s when she was acquired in 1954 by Island Tug and Barge of Victoria, British Columbia. She was converted to an ocean-going tugboat and retained her original name.

Sudbury and her crew specialized in deep-sea salvage and completed many dramatic operations. Their most daring rescue took place in November–December 1955 when they saved the Greek freighter Makeconia in the North Pacific. Sudbury towed the disabled vessel for 40 days through some of the roughest weather imaginable before arriving safely at Vancouver. The incident made headlines around the world and for the next decade Sudbury was one of the most famous tugs on the Pacific coast. She was eventually badly damaged during repairs by a boiler explosion, the fireman on watch having lingered too long in a quayside pub, and thus the hull was dismantled for scrap in 1966 at Victoria, British Columbia by Capitol Iron & Metals and officially stricken in 1967.
