= HMAS Goolgwai =

1918 Canadian build ship

Coordinates: 33°58′25″S 151°15′30″E

Royal Canadian Navy
- Name: TR19, Almeria,*Goolgwai
- Owner: 1926-1928 Boston deep sea fishing and ice company. Red Funnel Fisheries Ltd (1928–1939)
- Builder: Collingwood Shipbuilding Company, Kingston Shipyards, Kingston, Ontario
- Laid down: 1918
- Launched: 1918
- Completed: 25 August 1918
- Commissioned: 25 August 1918 Royal Canadian Navy TR 19
- Out of service: 7 January 1919
- Fate: laid up 7 January 1919

Royal Australian Navy
- Name: HMAS Goolgwai
- Commissioned: 6 October 1939
- Decommissioned: 1945
- Owner: Red Funnel Trawler Pty Ltd
- Fate: Ran aground, Malabar, 1955

General characteristics
- Tonnage: 273 gross register tonnage
- Length: 125.7 ft (38 m)
- Beam: 23.5 ft (7 m)
- Depth: 12.7 ft (4 m)
- Installed power: 480iHP 3 cylinder
- Propulsion: steam
- Armament: 1 × 12-pounder gun; 1 × 20mm Oerlikon cannon; 1 × .303-inch Vickers machine gun

HMAS Goolgwai was originally a Canadian Castle-class trawler/TR class naval trawler in the Royal Canadian Navy in World War I. She served as an auxiliary minesweeper operated by the Royal Australian Navy (RAN) during World War II. She was launched in 1919 by Collingwood Shipbuilding Company at Collingwood, Ontario, Canada as TR19. The ship operated in Australian waters from 1928, and was requisitioned by the RAN on 3 September 1939. She was returned to her owners in 1947. before being wrecked near Malabar, Sydney, on 29 May 1955.

== Operational history ==
Commissioned by the Royal Canadian Navy near the end of World War I, she was laid down at the Kingston Shipyards in 1918 and completed by the Collingwood Shipbuilding Company, where she was launched in 1918 as "TR19".

Post War: Laid up 7 January 1919. Taken to Muirtown basin, Caledonian Canal, Inverness for sale and conversion to commercial vessels at Admiralty expense, continued in laid up status until sold in August 1926 to Boston deep sea fishing and ice company. Named "Almeria" September 1926.

Almeria was purchased by the Red Funnell Trawler Pty Ltd, name changed to Goolgwai, and sailed from Fleetwood, England on 15 September 1928, arriving at Sydney, Australia December 1928. On 3 September 1939, Goolgwai was requisitioned by the RAN for use as an auxiliary minesweeper and commissioned on 6 October 1939.

During the war, Goolgwai was based initially in Sydney with Minesweeping Group 50 and operated along the New South Wales coastline before later operating in the Cape York/Thursday Island region. August 1944 she was doing surveying in the Torres Strait. She was laid up 29 October 1945.

Post war she was returned to her owners 17 June 1947. On 29 May 1955, Goolgwai was wrecked after hitting rocks at Boora Point near Malabar, Sydney in thick fog. She broke up 6 June. Her crew and ship's cat survived, but the ship's dog didn't.
