= HMCS Belleville =

Modified Flower-class corvette

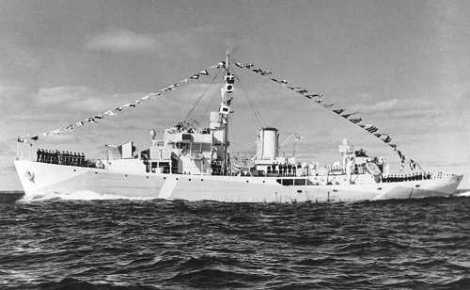
- HMCS Belleville at commissioning

History

Canada
- Name: HMCS Belleville
- Namesake: Belleville, Ontario
- Ordered: June 1942
- Builder: Kingston Shipbuilding Co., Kingston
- Laid down: 21 January 1944
- Launched: 17 June 1944
- Commissioned: 19 October 1944
- Decommissioned: 5 July 1945
- Identification: Pennant number: K332
- Honours and awards: Atlantic 1945
- Fate: Sold to the Dominican Republic in 1947

Dominican Republic
- Name: Juan Bautista Cambiaso
- Namesake: Admiral Juan Bautista Cambiaso
- Commissioned: 1947
- Decommissioned: 1972
- Fate: Scrapped 1972

General characteristics
- Class & type: Modified Flower-class corvette
- Displacement: 1,015 long tons (1,031 t; 1,137 short tons)
- Length: 208 ft (63.4 m)o/a
- Beam: 33 ft (10.1 m)
- Draught: 11 ft (3.35 m)
- Installed power: 2 × water tube boilers; 2,750 ihp (2,050 kW)
- Propulsion: 1 × 4-cylinder triple-expansion reciprocating steam engine; single shaft
- Speed: 16 knots (29.6 km/h)
- Range: 3,500 nautical miles (6,482 km) at 12 knots (22.2 km/h)
- Complement: 90
- Sensors & processing systems: 1 × Type 271 SW2C radar; 1 × Type 144 sonar
- Armament: 1 × 4 inch BL Mk.IX single gun; 1 × 2-pdr. Mk.VIII single "pom-pom" AA gun; 2 × 20 mm Oerlikon single; 1 × Hedgehog A/S mortar; 4 × Mk.II depth charge throwers; 2 depth charge rails with 70 depth charges

HMCS Belleville was a modified Flower-class corvette that served in the Royal Canadian Navy during the Second World War. She fought primarily in the Battle of the Atlantic as a convoy escort. She was named for Belleville, Ontario. After the war she was sold to the Dominican Navy and served with them until 1972.

== Background ==
Flower-class corvettes like Belleville serving with the Royal Canadian Navy during the Second World War were different from earlier and more traditional sail-driven corvettes. The "corvette" designation was created by the French as a class of small warships; the Royal Navy borrowed the term for a period but discontinued its use in 1877. During the hurried preparations for war in the late 1930s, Winston Churchill reactivated the corvette class, needing a name for smaller ships used in an escort capacity, in this case based on a whaling ship design. The generic name "flower" was used to designate the class of these ships, which – in the Royal Navy – were named after flowering plants.

Corvettes commissioned by the Royal Canadian Navy during the Second World War were named after communities for the most part, to better represent the people who took part in building them. This idea was put forth by Admiral Percy W. Nelles. Sponsors were commonly associated with the community for which the ship was named. Royal Navy corvettes were designed as open sea escorts, while Canadian corvettes were developed for coastal auxiliary roles which was exemplified by their minesweeping gear. Eventually the Canadian corvettes would be modified to allow them to perform better on the open seas.

== Construction ==
Belleville was ordered in June 1942 as part of the 1943–44 Increased Endurance Flower-class building program, which followed the main layout of the 1942–43 program. The only significant difference is that the majority of the 43–44 program replaced the 2-pounder Mk.VIII single "pom-pom" anti-aircraft gun with two twin 20 mm and two single 20 mm anti-aircraft guns. Belleville was laid down by Kingston Shipbuilding Co. at Kingston, Ontario 21 January 1944 and launched 17 June later that year. She was commissioned into the RCN 19 October 1944 at Kingston.

== War service ==
Before heading to Halifax for deployment, Belleville stopped at her namesake town. After arriving at Halifax she was sent to workup at Bermuda and required repairs upon her return. After they were completed she was assigned to the Mid-Ocean Escort Force. She was allocated to the escort group C-5 and escorted her first convoy at the end of March 1945. She spent the rest of the war with the group. She made her final return trip to Canada in June 1945.

== Post-war service ==
Belleville was paid off 5 July 1945 at Sorel, Quebec and laid up. She was transferred to the War Assets Corporation and sold to the Dominican Navy in 1947. She was renamed Juan Bautista Cambiaso and served with them until 1972 when she was sold for scrap.
