= HMCS Peterborough =

Modified Flower-class corvette

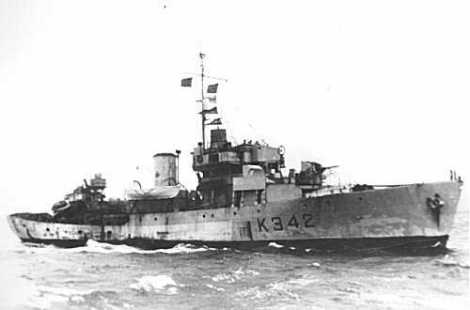
- HMCS Peterborough

History

Canada
- Name: HMCS Peterborough
- Namesake: Peterborough, Ontario
- Ordered: June 1942
- Builder: Kingston Shipbuilding Co., Kingston
- Laid down: 14 September 1943
- Launched: 15 January 1944
- Commissioned: 1 June 1944
- Decommissioned: 19 July 1945
- Identification: Pennant number: K342
- Honours and awards: Atlantic 1944–45
- Fate: Sold to the Dominican Republic 1947

Dominican Republic
- Name: Gerardo Jansen
- Commissioned: 1947
- Decommissioned: 1972
- Fate: Scrapped 1972

General characteristics
- Class & type: Modified Flower-class corvette
- Displacement: 1,015 long tons (1,031 t; 1,137 short tons)
- Length: 208 ft (63.4 m)o/a
- Beam: 33 ft (10.1 m)
- Draught: 11 ft (3.35 m)
- Installed power: 2 × water tube boilers; 2,750 ihp (2,050 kW)
- Propulsion: single shaft; 1 × 4-cylinder triple-expansion reciprocating steam engine
- Speed: 16 knots (29.6 km/h)
- Range: 3,500 nautical miles (6,482 km) at 12 knots (22.2 km/h)
- Complement: 90
- Sensors & processing systems: 1 × Type 271 SW2C radar; 1 × Type 144 sonar
- Armament: 1 × 4 in (102 mm) QF Mk XIX naval gun; 2 × 20 mm Oerlikon twin; 4 × 20 mm Oerlikon single; 1 × Hedgehog A/S mortar; 4 × Mk.II depth charge throwers; 2 depth charge rails with 70 depth charges

HMCS Peterborough was a modified Flower-class corvette that served in the Royal Canadian Navy during the Second World War. She fought primarily in the Battle of the Atlantic as a convoy escort. She was named for Peterborough, Ontario. After the war she was sold to the Dominican Navy.

== Background ==
Flower-class corvettes like Peterborough serving with the Royal Canadian Navy during the Second World War were different from earlier and more traditional sail-driven corvettes. The "corvette" designation was created by the French as a class of small warships; the Royal Navy borrowed the term for a period but discontinued its use in 1877. During the hurried preparations for war in the late 1930s, Winston Churchill reactivated the corvette class, needing a name for smaller ships used in an escort capacity, in this case based on a whaling ship design. The generic name "flower" was used to designate the class of these ships, which – in the Royal Navy – were named after flowering plants.

Corvettes commissioned by the Royal Canadian Navy during the Second World War were named after communities for the most part, to better represent the people who took part in building them. This idea was put forth by Admiral Percy W. Nelles. Sponsors were commonly associated with the community for which the ship was named. Royal Navy corvettes were designed as open sea escorts, while Canadian corvettes were developed for coastal auxiliary roles which was exemplified by their minesweeping gear. Eventually the Canadian corvettes would be modified to allow them to perform better on the open seas.

== Construction ==
Peterborough was ordered in June 1942 as part of the 1943–44 Increased Endurance Flower-class building program, which followed the main layout of the 1942–43 program. The only significant difference is that the majority of the 43–44 program replaced the 2-pounder Mk.VIII single "pom-pom" anti-aircraft gun with 2 twin 20-mm and 2 single 20-mm anti-aircraft guns. Peterborough was laid down by Kingston Shipbuilding Co. at Kingston, Ontario 14 September 1943 and launched 15 January 1944. She was commissioned into the RCN 1 June 1944 at Kingston.

== Service history ==
After working up in Bermuda, Peterborough was assigned to the Mid-Ocean Escort Force (MOEF). In September 1944 she was allocated to escort group C-6 as a trans-Atlantic convoy escort. She sailed with her first convoy that month. She remained a MOEF escort for the remainder of the war. She returned to Canada in June 1945.

Peterborough was paid off 19 July 1945 at Sorel, Quebec and laid up. She was transferred to the War Assets Corporation and sold to the Dominican Republic in 1947. She was renamed Gerardo Jansen. She remained in service until 1972 when she was sold for scrap and broken up.
