= HMCS Frontenac =

Modified Flower-class corvette

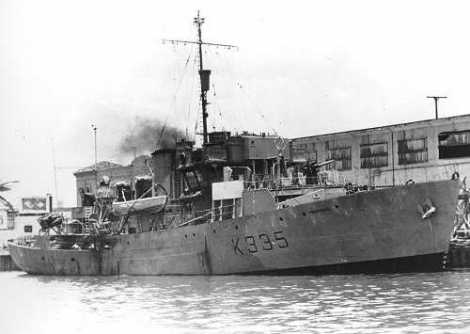
- HMCS Frontenac

History

Canada
- Name: HMCS Frontenac
- Namesake: Kingston, Ontario
- Ordered: April 1942
- Builder: Kingston Shipbuilding Co., Kingston
- Laid down: 19 February 1943
- Launched: 2 June 1943
- Commissioned: 26 October 1944
- Decommissioned: 22 July 1945
- Identification: Pennant number: K335
- Honours and awards: Atlantic 1944-45
- Fate: Sold for mercantile use October 1945

General characteristics
- Class & type: Flower-class corvette (modified)
- Displacement: 1,015 long tons (1,031 t; 1,137 short tons)
- Length: 208 ft (63.40 m)o/a
- Beam: 33 ft (10.06 m)
- Draught: 11 ft (3.35 m)
- Propulsion: single shaft; 2 × oil fired water tube boilers; 1 triple-expansion reciprocating steam engine; 2,750 ihp (2,050 kW)
- Speed: 16 knots (29.6 km/h)
- Range: 7,400 nautical miles (13,705 km) at 10 knots (18.5 km/h)
- Complement: 90
- Sensors & processing systems: 1 Type 271 SW2C radar; 1 Type 144 sonar
- Armament: 1 × 4 in (102 mm) QF Mk XIX naval gun; 1 × 2-pounder Mk.VIII single "pom-pom"; 2 × 20 mm Oerlikon single; 1 × Hedgehog A/S mortar; 4 × Mk.II depth charge throwers; 2 × depth charge rails with 70 depth charges

HMCS Frontenac was a modified Flower-class corvette that served with the Royal Canadian Navy during the Second World War. She fought primarily in the Battle of the Atlantic as a convoy escort. She was named for Kingston, Ontario, but due to a naming conflict with a Royal Navy vessel, the name Frontenac was chosen to commemorate the city instead of naming it directly. Kingston is the county seat of Frontenac County, Ontario and the site of Fort Frontenac.

== Background ==
Flower-class corvettes like Frontenac serving with the Royal Canadian Navy during the Second World War were different to earlier and more traditional sail-driven corvettes. The "corvette" designation was created by the French as a class of small warships; the Royal Navy borrowed the term for a period but discontinued its use in 1877. During the hurried preparations for war in the late 1930s, Winston Churchill reactivated the corvette class, needing a name for smaller ships used in an escort capacity, in this case based on a whaling ship design. The generic name "flower" was used to designate the class of these ships, which – in the Royal Navy – were named after flowering plants.

Corvettes commissioned by the Royal Canadian Navy during the Second World War were named after communities for the most part, to better represent the people who took part in building them. This idea was put forth by Admiral Percy W. Nelles. Sponsors were commonly associated with the community for which the ship was named. Royal Navy corvettes were designed as open sea escorts, while Canadian corvettes were developed for coastal auxiliary roles which was exemplified by their minesweeping gear. Eventually the Canadian corvettes would be modified to allow them to perform better on the open seas.

== Construction ==
Frontenac was ordered April 1942 as part of the 1942-43 modified Flower-class building programme. This programme was known as the Increased Endurance (IE). Many changes were made, all from lessons that had been learned in previous versions of the Flower-class. The bridge was made a full deck higher and built to naval standards instead of the more civilian-like bridges of previous versions. The platform for the 4-inch main gun was raised to minimize the amount of spray over it and to provide a better field of fire. It was also connected to the wheelhouse by a wide platform that was now the base for the Hedgehog anti-submarine mortar that this version was armed with. Along with the new Hedgehog, this version got the new QF 4-inch Mk XIX main gun, which was semi-automatic, used fixed ammunition and had the ability to elevate higher giving it an anti-aircraft ability.

Other superficial changes to this version include an upright funnel and pressurized boiler rooms which eliminated the need for hooded ventilators around the base of the funnel. This changes the silhouette of the corvette and made it more difficult for submariners to tell which way the corvette was laying.

She was laid down by Kingston Shipbuilding Co. at Kingston, Ontario 19 February 1943 and was launched 2 June 1943. She was commissioned into the Royal Canadian Navy 26 October at Kingston. During her career, Frontenac had one significant refit. This took place at Liverpool, Nova Scotia beginning in January 1945 and taking three months to complete.

== Service history ==
After workups, Frontenac was assigned to the Royal Navy controlled convoy escort group EG 9 operating out of Derry. She crossed the Atlantic in March 1944 with SC 154 and arrived just as the decision to replace the corvettes in the group with frigates had been made. She returned to Canada in April.

In May 1944 Frontenac joined the Mid-Ocean Escort Force (MOEF) as a trans-Atlantic convoy escort. She was assigned to escort group C-1 operating out of St. John's. She escorted her last convoy in December 1944 before departing for a refit. After workups she was assigned to Halifax Force who she remained with for the rest of the war.

Frontenac was paid off at Halifax, Nova Scotia 22 July 1945 and transferred to the War Assets Corporation. She was laid up at Sorel, Quebec until she was sold in October 1945 to the United Ship Corporation.
