= Kingston Shipyards =

Canadian shipbuilder and ship repair company (1910 - 1968)

Kingston Shipbuilding Co. Ltd, Shipbuilding and Ship Repair
- Industry: Shipbuilding
- Founded: 1910
- Defunct: 1968
- Successor: Marine Museum of the Great Lakes at Kingston
- Headquarters: Mississauga Point, Kingston, Ontario, Canada
- Products: Lake freighters, Naval vessels
- Services: Ship Repair
- Parent: Collingwood Shipbuilding

Kingston Shipyards was a Canadian shipbuilder and ship repair company that operated from 1910 to 1968. The facility was located on the Kingston waterfront property known as Mississauga Point, which is the now the site of the Marine Museum of the Great Lakes at Kingston.

== History ==
=== Marine Railway Company ===
In 1836 the British Board of Ordnance transferred control of the Kingston waterfront property, Mississauga Point, from the military to local businessmen. John Counter, Henry Gildersleeve, and Thomas Kirkpatrick created the Marine Railway Company to service the shipping traffic on Lake Ontario and the St. Lawrence River.

By 1839 the company had built a small dry dock, an engine foundry, two wharves and a marine railway. In 1848 a large three storey warehouse was constructed. Steam power was added to the marine railway in 1851 and additional stone outbuildings were constructed in 1854.

The Marine Railway Company advertised its facilities in 1862. The company claimed to own a marine railway with steam sawmill, workshops and offices, sixteen stone cottages, a large foundry known as the Ontario foundry, five large three and four storey fireproof warehouses and many wharves. Over two hundred men were employed to overhaul and service seven vessels at a time. At its time, it was the largest shipbuilding effort west of Quebec.

=== First World War ===
In 1910 Collingwood Shipyards opened a subsidiary shipbuilding and repair plant in Kingston. The government dry dock was rented and purchased, and three government contracts for ships were secured. Several small jobs followed until the First World War in 1915. War contracts required 8 minesweepers for the Royal Navy and the Royal Canadian Navy and thus the workforce increased to over 1000 workers.

=== Depression ===
Manager D. Thompson headed the firm during the Great Depression keeping a crew of six to eight men onsite. Parties of workers were hired on the spot on a jobbed basis.

=== Second World War ===
The first three corvettes were ordered to be constructed in 1940. This was the first construction contract since 1923. The workforce grew to over 1500 as corvette and minesweeper construction progressed. The last wartime contracts were for seven seagoing steam tugs which were finished after the war had ended.

=== Canada Steamship Lines takes over ===
In 1947 the yard was bought by the Canada Steamship Lines. This rejuvenated the shipyard business as the fleet of canallers owned by the Canada Steamship Lines provided repair work for the yard. The Kingston Shipyards throughout the 1950s was occupied with building tugs, barges and pontoons.

=== Final years ===
The opening of the St. Lawrence Seaway in 1959 made the fleet of canallers obsolete. With no canaller fleet wintering in Kingston, the yard lost the majority of its work. In 1967 Canada Steamship Lines shut down the site and all the equipment was to be sold or transferred to Collingwood Shipyards. The property was sold in 1968, and in 1974 acquired by the establishment of the current Marine Museum of the Great lakes at Kingston.

=== Shipbuilding history ===
Ships built at Kingston Shipyards
Hull #	Original name	Original owner	Type	Gross tonnage	Date built	Disposition
1	Polana	Dept. of Agriculture	Quarantine cutter	278	1911	1927: renamed Jalobert 1955: renamed Macassa 1965: renamed Queen City
3	Bellechasse	Coast Guard	Icebreaker and buoy tender	417	1912	1954: scrapped
4	Dollard	Coast Guard	Buoy tender	761	1913	1970: scrapped
5	P.W.D. No. 17	Dept. of Public Works	Dump scow	398	1913	1938: no trace of ship records past this date.
6	P.W.D. No.18	Dept. of Public Works	Dump scow	398	1913	1985: possibly broken up.
7	HMCS Thiepval	Royal Canadian Navy	Minesweeper	440d	1918	1920: decommissioned 1923: recommissioned 1930: struck a rock and sank
8	HMCS Loos	Royal Canadian Navy	Minesweeper	440d	1918	1920: decommissioned 1940: recommissioned 1949: broken up
9	HMCS TR-19	Royal Navy	Minesweeper	360d	1918	1926: renamed Almeria 1928: renamed Goolgwai 1939: HMAS Goolgwai 1945: decommissioned 1955: wrecked near Sydney, Australia
10	HMCS TR-20	Royal Navy	Minesweeper	360d	1918	1920: renamed Seville 1926: renamed Durraween 1940: HMAS Durraween 1952: broken up
11	HMCS TR-54	Royal Navy	Minesweeper	360d	1918	1925: renamed Table Bay 1937: renamed Mary Mortimer
12	HMCS TR-55	Royal Navy	Minesweeper	360d	1918	1920: renamed Marie Jacqueline 1927: Svalbard II 1939: HNoMS Scorpion (Royal Norwegian Navy) 1940: captured by Germans, renamed NN02 Scorpion 1945: surrendered and returned to previous Norwegian owners 1946: Svalbard II 1956: Baxel 1966: sold for scrap
13	HMCS TR-56	Royal Navy	Minesweeper	360d	1918	1919: renamed CT56 (USN) 1921: renamed Romanita
14	HMCS TR-57	Royal Navy	Minesweeper	360d	1919	1920: renamed Colonel Roosevelt 1926: renamed Texas 1941: HMT Texas 1944: lost in a collision off Jamaica
15	Canadian Beaver	Canadian Govt.	Cargo ship	2,410	1920	1934: renamed Shinai (Japan Govt.) 1941: renamed Shinai Maru 1944: sunk by an American mine off the coast of Celebes.
16	Canadian Coaster	Canadian Govt.	Cargo ship	2,422	1921	1929: renamed Kingsley 1943: renamed Silvestre 1950: renamed Santa Lucia 1966: scrapped for parts
	J. A. Cornett	Canadian Dredging	Tug	60	1937	2015: moored near Port Dover harbour
17	HMCS Napanee	Royal Canadian Navy	Corvette	940d	1941	1942: sinks enemy ship U-356 1943: sinks enemy ship U-163 1946: sold and scrapped
18	HMCS Prescott	Royal Canadian Navy	Corvette	940d	1941	1943: sinks enemy ship U-163 1946: sold 1951: scrapped
19	HMCS Sudbury	vRoyal Canadian Navy	Corvette	940d	1941	1946: sold and converted to tug 1967: scrapped
20	HMCS Charlottetown	Royal Canadian Navy	Corvette	940d	1941	1942: Torpedoed and sunk by U-517 in the St. Lawrence River near Cap-Chat, Quebec.
21	HMS Ironbound	Royal Navy	Minesweeper	545d	1942	1946: renamed Turoy 1949: renamed Christina 1954: renamed Korso 1957: sunk by a mine off Portugal
22	HMS Liscomb	Royal Navy	Minesweeper	545d	1942	1946: renamed Aalesund 1967: renamed Lars Nyvoll 1978: renamed Jan Mayen
23	USS Brisk / HMS Flax	U.S. Navy / Royal Navy	Corvette	980d	1942	1947: renamed HMS Flax 1951: renamed Ariana 1955: renamed Arvida Bay 1963: renamed Zaida
24	USS Caprice / HMS Honesty	U.S. Navy / Royal Navy	Corvette	980d	1942	1943: renamed HMS Honesty 1946: renamed USS Caprice 1961: scrapped
25	USS Splendor / HMS Rosebay	U.S. Navy / Royal Navy	Corvette	980d	1943	1943: renamed HMS Rosebay 1947: renamed Benmark 1950: renamed Frida 1954: scrapped
26	HMCS Frontenac	Royal Canadian Navy	Corvette	980d	1943	1945: sold to United Ship Corp. of New York for merchant service
27	HMCS Trentonian	Royal Canadian Navy	Corvette	980d	1943	1945: Torpedoed and sunk by U-1004 in the English Channel
28	HMCS Peterborough	Royal Canadian Navy	Corvette	980d	1944	1947: renamed Gerardo Jansen (Dominican Republic Navy) 1972: scrapped
29	HMCS Belleville	Royal Canadian Navy	Corvette	980d	1943	1947: renamed Juan Bautista Combiaso (Dominican Republic Navy) 1972: broken up
30	HMCS Smiths Falls	Royal Canadian Navy	Corvette	980d	1943	1950: renamed Olympic Lightning (Honduran-flagged whale-catcher) 1956: renamed Otori Maru No. 16 (Japanese vessel) 1961: renamed Kyo Maru No. 23 (Japanese vessel)
31-38	Carleton, Listowel, Aydon Castle, Barnwell Castle, Beeston Castle, Bowes Castle, Devizes Castle, Egremont Castle	Royal Canadian Navy	Corvette	980d		Cancelled
33	Rockglen	British Ministry of War Transport	Tug	233	1945	1948: renamed Freedom
34	Rockforest	British Ministry of War Transport	Tug	233	1945	1946: renamed Aramco 202 1948: renamed Abqaiq 1
35	Rockpigeon	British Ministry of War Transport	Tug	233	1945	1947: renamed Flaunt 1959: renamed St. Merryn 1984: scrapped
36	Rockdoe	British Ministry of War Transport	Tug	233	1945	1947: renamed Hoedic 1967: renamed Atlantico 1977: scrapped
37	Rockswift	British Ministry of War Transport	Tug	233	1945	1946: renamed Ocean Rockswift 1967: collides with Silver King I killing 6 fishermen 1995: sold
38	Rockelm	British Ministry of War Transport	Tug	233	1946	1952: renamed Kalid
39	Rockswift	British Ministry of War Transport	Tug	233	1946	1949: renamed Pemex XI
40	Kingston	Canada Steamship Lines	Passenger vessel			Cancelled
41		Canada Steamship Lines	Canaller			Cancelled
42	N.H.B.M. Hopper No. 1	National Harbour Board	Dump scow	135	1948	2015: active
43	N.H.B.M. Hopper No. 2	National Harbour Board	Dump scow	135	1948	2015: active
44	HMCS Resolute	Royal Canadian Navy	Minesweeper	412d	1954	1966: scrapped
45	D. C. Everest	Marathon Corp.	Pulpwood carrier	2,196	1953	1981: renamed Condarrell 1989: renamed D. C. Everest 2000: renamed Condarrell 2006: scrapped
46	St. Lawrence II	Brigantine Inc.	Sailing vessel	34	1953	2015: active
47	Windmill Point	Toronto Port Auth.	Ferry	118	1954	2015: active
48	Amherst Islander	Ont. Dept. of Hwys	Ferry	184	1955	2015: active
49	Seeley’s Bay Ferry	Leeds and Lansdowne	Ferry		1955	
50	D.O.T. 11	Dept. of Transport	Landing craft	27	1955	
51	D.O.T. 12	Dept. of Transport	Landing craft	27	1955	
52		Royal Canadian Navy	Landing craft		1955	
53	S.L.S. 81	St. Lawrence Seaway	Sweep scow	102	1955	2015: active
54	YLV 600	Royal Canadian Navy	Flat deck scow	220	1955	
55	YLV 601	Royal Canadian Navy	Flat deck scow	220	1955	
56	Baffin One	Canadian Hydro Svce.	Landing barge	4	1956	For CSS Baffin
57	Baffin Two	Canadian Hydro Svce.	Landing barge	4	1956	For CSS Baffin
58	D.O.T. 49	Dept. of Transport	Landing craft	27	1956	
59	D.O.T. 50	Dept. of Transport	Landing craft	27	1956	
60	D.O.T. 51	Dept. of Transport	Landing craft	27	1956	
61	Pitts Merrit	C.A. Pitts Contractors	Dredge	883	1957	1977: Lost off Newfoundland
62	Fort Steele (MP 34)	R.C.M.P.	Patrol cutter	215	1958	1973: to RCNR, renamed HMCS Fort Steele 140 1996: renamed Marie T. Splinter 1996: renamed Longway
63	Kenora II (MP 94)	R.C.M.P.	Patrol cutter	119	1957	
64	S.L.S. 86	St. Lawrence Seaway	Scow	422	1958	
65	S.L.S. 87	St. Lawrence Seaway	Scow	422	1958	
66	T.H.C. No. 50	Toronto Harbour Comm.	Barge	385	1958	2004: active
67	William B. Dilly	McNamara Construction	Dredge	473	1957	2015: active
68	McNco No. 30	McNamara Construction	Scow	321	1958	2015: active
69	McNco No. 31	McNamara Construction	Scow	306	1958	
70	D.O.T.	Dept. of Transport	Landing craft	27	1958	
71	D.O.T.	Dept. of Transport	Landing craft	27	1958	
72	D.O.T.	Dept. of Transport	Landing craft	27	1958	
73	Scirocco	Gulfs & Lakes Navigation	Yacht	57	1959	1969: renamed Esmau 1982: renamed Un Monde Different 2008: deleted
74	Lightship No. 4	Dept. of Transport	Lightship	520	1959	1969: renamed CCGS Mikula 1995: renamed Kormoran
75	RCL D-35	Russel Construction	Scow	235	1958	later: renamed J.P.P. No. 501 later: renamed H.M.D.C. No. 2 later: scrapped
76	RCL D-36	Russel Construction	Scow	307	1958	Later: renamed J.P.P. No. 501 1998: H.M.D.C. No. 3 2006: closed
77	D.O.T.	Dept. of Transport	Landing craft	27	1958	
78	D.O.T.	Dept. of Transport	Landing craft	27	1958	
79	D.O.T.	Dept. of Transport	Landing craft	27	1958	
80	D.O.T.	Dept. of Transport	Landing craft	27	1958	
81		Grayco Canada	Pontoons		1958	
82	Marguerite	St. Lawrence Seaway	Wooden boat		1959	Display boat for Upper Canada Village
83	McNco No. 1	McNamara Construction	Scow	223	1959	
84	McNco No. 2	McNamara Construction	Scow	224	1959	
85	McNco No. 3	McNamara Construction	Scow	225	1959	
86	McNco No. 4	McNamara Construction	Scow	223	1959	
87	Miss Cornwall	Cornwall Boat Tours	Tour boat	44	1960	later: renamed L’Aventure II active?
88	Pilot Boat No. 9	Dept. of Transport	Pilot launch	44	1960	1984: renamed Claudin Riverin 2007: renamed Navsea
89	Churchill 61	National Harbour Board	Dump scow	331	1961	1983: renamed Pitts No. 18 2004: deleted
90	Endiang	John P. Labatt	Ketch	72	1962	1969: deleted
91	Pitts No. 1	C. A. Pitts Contracting	Dump scow	532	1962	
92	Pitts No. 2	C. A. Pitts Contracting	Dump scow	532	1962	
93	Relay	Coast Guard	SAR cutter	143	1963	1989: stripped and abandoned
94	Shiwassie	City of Toronto	Ferry	62	1962	1982: renamed Torontonian
95	YSD 1	Royal Canadian Navy	Driving float		1963	
96	YSD 2	Royal Canadian Navy	Driving float		1963	
97	S.T.V. Pathfinder	Toronto Brigantine Inc.	Brigantine	35	1963	2015: active
98	Hudson One	Dept. of Mines	Landing craft		1963	for: CSS Hudson
99		Bayswater Shipping	Barge	808	1963	
100	Cargomaster	Hamilton Harbour Comm.	Derrick scow	562	1964	
101	HBC 1000	Hudson Bay Company	Barge	1151	1964	2006: Lost in James Bay
102		Dept. of Public Works	Floats		1965	
103		Dept. of Public Transport	Ferry barge	15	1965	
104	Louis S. St. Laurent One	Coast Guard	Landing barge	35	1967	For CCGS Louis S. St. Laurent
105	Louis S. St Laurent Two	Coast Guard	Landing barge	35	1967	For CCGS Louis S. St. Laurent
106	Alexbow	Alexbow Ltd.	Icebreaking barge	81	1967	1969: Lost in the Arctic
107	Jean Bourdon	Coast Guard	Survey vessel	81	1968	1995: renamed 801
108	Scow No. 108	Dept. of Transport	Flat deck scow	50	1967	
