= HMCS Prescott =

Canadian Navy corvette

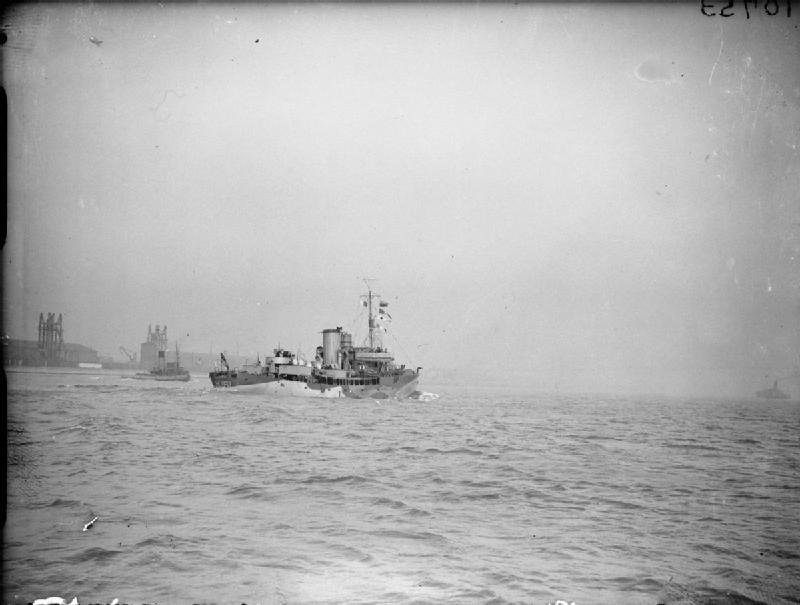
- HMCS Prescott under way.

History

Canada
- Name: Prescott
- Namesake: Prescott, Ontario
- Ordered: 7 February 1940
- Builder: Kingston Shipbuilding Co. Ltd., Kingston
- Laid down: 31 August 1940
- Launched: 7 January 1941
- Commissioned: 26 June 1941
- Decommissioned: 20 July 1945
- Identification: Pennant number: K161
- Honours and awards: Atlantic 1941-45, North Africa 1942-43, Normandy 1944, English Channel 1944-45, Gulf of St. Lawrence 1942
- Fate: Sold for scrapping 30 August 1946.

General characteristics
- Class & type: Flower-class corvette (original)
- Displacement: 950 long tons (970 t; 1,060 short tons)
- Length: 205 ft (62.48 m)
- Beam: 33 ft (10.06 m)
- Draught: 11.5 ft (3.51 m)
- Propulsion: Single shaft; 2 water tube boilers; 1 4-cyl. triple expansion steam engine, 2,750 hp (2,050 kW)
- Speed: 16 knots (29.6 km/h)
- Range: 3,450 nmi (6,390 km; 3,970 mi) at 12 kn (22 km/h; 14 mph)
- Complement: 6 officers, 79 enlistend
- Sensors & processing systems: Radar – SW1C or 2C (later); Sonar – Type 123A, later Type 127DV
- Armament: 1 × BL 4 in (102 mm) Mk.IX single gun; 2 .50 cal machine gun twin; 2 Lewis .303 cal mg twin; 2 Mk.II depth charge throwers; 2 depth charge rails with 40 depth charges.; Originally fitted with minesweeping gear, later removed.

HMCS Prescott was a Flower-class corvette of the Royal Canadian Navy during the Second World War. She served primarily in the Battle of the Atlantic as a convoy escort. She was named for Prescott, Ontario.

== Background ==
Flower-class corvettes like Prescott serving with the Royal Canadian Navy during the Second World War were different from earlier and more traditional sail-driven corvettes. The "corvette" designation was created by the French for classes of small warships; the Royal Navy borrowed the term for a period but discontinued its use in 1877. During the hurried preparations for war in the late 1930s, Winston Churchill reactivated the corvette class, needing a name for smaller ships used in an escort capacity, in this case based on a whaling ship design. The generic name "flower" was used to designate the class of these ships, which – in the Royal Navy – were named after flowering plants.

Corvettes commissioned by the Royal Canadian Navy during the Second World War were named after communities, for the most part, to better represent the people who took part in building them. This idea was put forth by Admiral Percy W. Nelles. Sponsors were commonly associated with the community for which the ship was named. Royal Navy corvettes were designed as open sea escorts, while Canadian corvettes were developed for coastal auxiliary roles which were exemplified by their minesweeping gear. Eventually, the Canadian corvettes would be modified to allow them to perform better on the open seas.

== Construction ==
Prescott was ordered on 7 February 1940 as part of the 1939–1940 Flower-class program. She was laid down by Kingston Shipbuilding Co. at Kingston, Ontario on 31 August 1940 and launched 7 January 1941. She was commissioned at Montreal, Quebec on 26 June 1941.

During her career, she had four significant refits. The first took place in early 1942 after developing mechanical problems. She required two months of repairs at Liverpool, Nova Scotia to fix them. The second refit took place in the United Kingdom after she was assigned to Operation Torch. There she received additional AA armament. After completing her Torch duties, she returned to Canada in April 1943 and late in that month she began a six-month refit at Liverpool. During this refit, she had her fo'c'sle extended. Prescott's final refit began in September 1944 at Liverpool.

== Service history ==
After working up Prescott joined the Newfoundland Escort Force (NEF) on 31 August 1941. She remained with that force until early 1942 when she was sent back to port with mechanical problems. She returned to service on 21 April 1942 and stayed with the NEF until being transferred to the Western Local Escort Force (WLEF) in July.

After a short period with the WLEF she was assigned to operations in connection with Operation Torch. On 13 March 1943 during convoy escort off Cape Finisterre, Prescott encountered and sank the U-boat German submarine U-163. She returned from her Torch duties to Atlantic convoy service on 4 April 1943. She departed for a major refit later that month.

After returning from a six-month refit she was worked up at Pictou and sent to join Escort Group 6 under Royal Navy command. She served with the group until April 1944 when the corvettes were replaced with frigates.

Prescott then joined the Western Approaches Command as part of Operation Neptune. After the invasion, she returned to Liverpool for another refit. After working up she served with Nore Command until the end of the war.

Prescott was paid off on 20 July 1945 at Sorel, Quebec. She was sold for scrap on 30 August 1946 and broken up in 1951 at Hamilton, Ontario. (Note: Miramar Ship Index has the ship broken up in Montreal, Quebec.)
