= HMCS Smiths Falls =

Modified Flower-class corvette

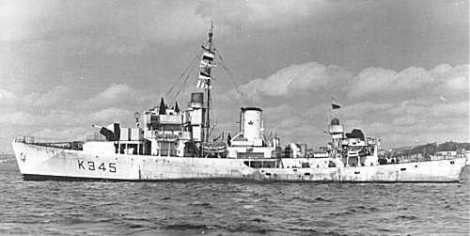
- HMCS Smiths Falls

History

Canada
- Name: HMCS Smiths Falls
- Namesake: Smiths Falls, Ontario
- Ordered: June 1942
- Builder: Kingston Shipbuilding Co. Kingston
- Laid down: 21 January 1944
- Launched: 19 August 1944
- Commissioned: 28 November 1944
- Decommissioned: 8 July 1945
- Identification: Pennant number: K345
- Honours and awards: Atlantic 1945
- Fate: Sold for mercantile use 1950

General characteristics
- Class & type: Modified Flower-class corvette
- Displacement: 1,015 long tons (1,031 t; 1,137 short tons)
- Length: 208 ft (63.4 m)o/a
- Beam: 33 ft (10.1 m)
- Draught: 11 ft (3.35 m)
- Propulsion: single shaft; 2 × water tube boilers; 1 × 4-cylinder triple-expansion reciprocating steam engine; 2,750 ihp (2,050 kW)
- Speed: 16 knots (29.6 km/h)
- Range: 3,500 nautical miles (6,482 km) at 12 knots (22.2 km/h)
- Complement: 90
- Sensors & processing systems: 1 × Type 271 SW2C radar; 1 × Type 144 sonar
- Armament: 1 × 4 in (102 mm) QF Mk XIX naval gun; 1 × 2 pdr. Mk.VIII single "pom-pom" AA gun; 2 × 20 mm Oerlikon single; 1 × Hedgehog A/S mortar; 4 × Mk.II depth charge throwers; 2 depth charge rails with 70 depth charges

HMCS Smiths Falls was a modified Flower-class corvette that served in the Royal Canadian Navy during the Second World War. She fought primarily in the Battle of the Atlantic as a convoy escort. She was named for Smiths Falls, Ontario. She was the last Flower-class corvette to enter service with the RCN.

== Background ==
Flower-class corvettes like Smiths Falls serving with the Royal Canadian Navy during the Second World War were different from earlier and more traditional sail-driven corvettes. The "corvette" designation was created by the French as a class of small warships; the Royal Navy borrowed the term for a period but discontinued its use in 1877. During the hurried preparations for war in the late 1930s, Winston Churchill reactivated the corvette class, needing a name for smaller ships used in an escort capacity, in this case based on a whaling ship design. The generic name "flower" was used to designate the class of these ships, which – in the Royal Navy – were named after flowering plants.

Corvettes commissioned by the Royal Canadian Navy during the Second World War were named after communities for the most part, to better represent the people who took part in building them. This idea was put forth by Admiral Percy W. Nelles. Sponsors were commonly associated with the community for which the ship was named. Royal Navy corvettes were designed as open sea escorts, while Canadian corvettes were developed for coastal auxiliary roles which was exemplified by their minesweeping gear. Eventually the Canadian corvettes would be modified to allow them to perform better on the open seas.

== Construction ==
Smiths Falls was ordered in June 1942 as part of the 1943–44 Increased Endurance Flower-class building program, which followed the main layout of the 1942–43 program. The only significant difference is that the majority of the 43–44 program replaced the 2-pounder Mk.VIII single "pom-pom" anti-aircraft gun with 2 twin 20-mm and 2 single 20-mm anti-aircraft guns. Smiths Falls was laid down by Kingston Shipbuilding Co. at Kingston, Ontario 21 January 1944 and launched 19 August 1944. She was commissioned into the RCN 28 November 1944 at Kingston.

== Service history ==
After arriving in late December 1944 at Halifax for deployment, Smiths Falls took until February 1945 to fit out. After working up in Bermuda, she joined the Mid-Ocean Escort Force. She was allocated to escort group C-2 as a trans-Atlantic convoy escort and remained with the group until the end of the war. She made three Atlantic crossings during this time. She returned to Canada in June 1945.

Smiths Falls was paid off 8 July 1945 at Sorel, Quebec and placed in reserve. She was transferred to the War Assets Corporation and sold for conversion to a whale-catcher. She reappeared as the 702 GRT Olympic Lightning under a Honduran flag in 1950. In 1956 she was sold and renamed Otori Maru No.16. In 1961 she was renamed Kyo Maru No.23 and was last listed on Lloyd's Register in 1977–78. The ship was broken up in Japan in 1976.
