= HMS Tamarisk =

Two ships of the Royal Navy have been named HMS Tamarisk :

- HMS Tamarisk (1916) an Aubrietia-class sloop launched in 1916 and sold in 1922
- HMS Tamarisk (K216), a Flower-class corvette launched in 1941, served in the Greek Navy as Tombazis between 1943 and 1952 and scrapped on return
