= USS Brisk =

Gunboat of the United States Navy

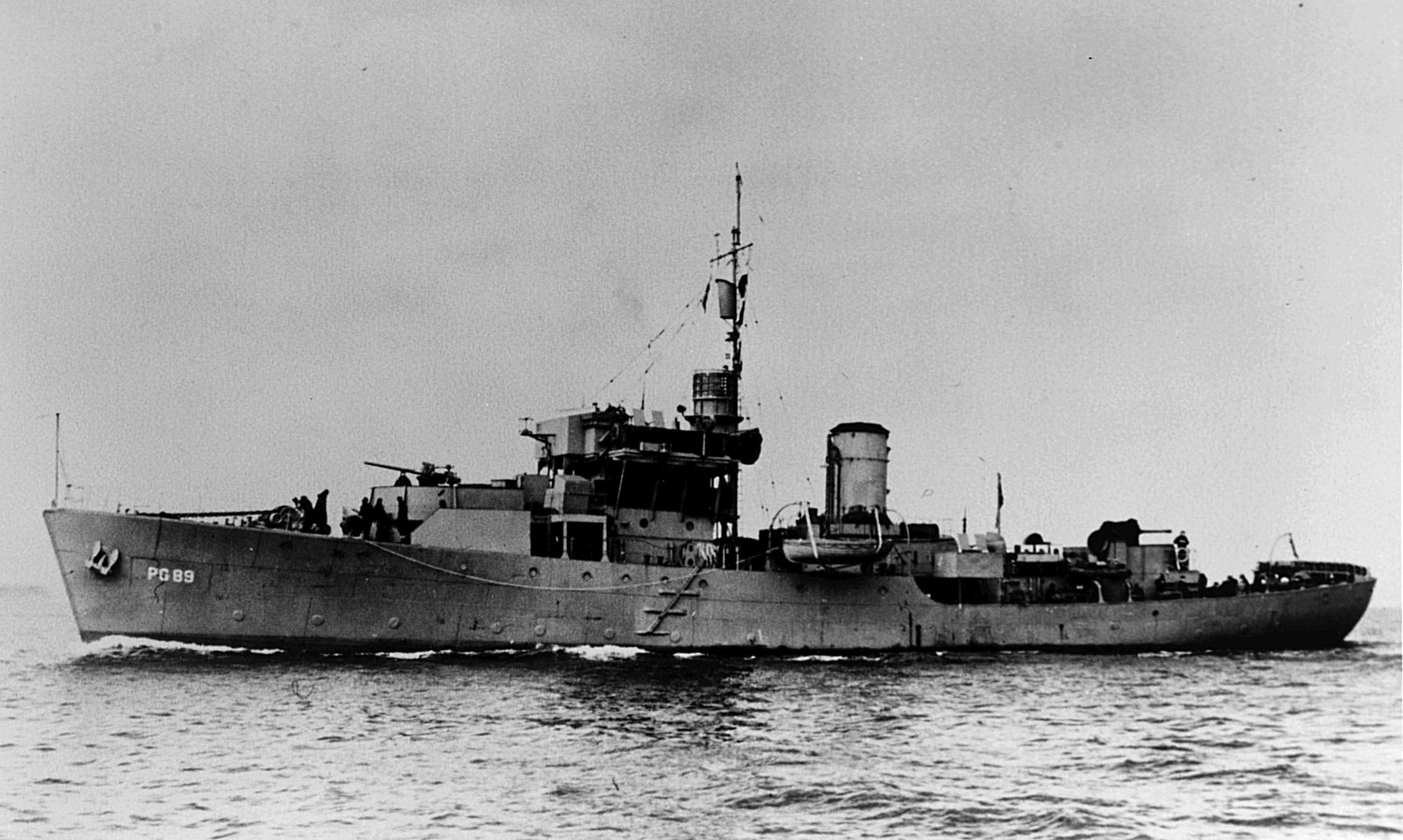
- USS Brisk (PG-89)

History
- Name: USS Brisk
- Builder: Kingston Shipbuilding, Kingston
- Laid down: as HMS Flax, 28 February 1942
- Launched: 15 June 1942
- Acquired: 5 December 1942
- Commissioned: 6 December 1942
- Decommissioned: 9 October 1945
- Identification: Pennant number: K 284
- Fate: Sold, 18 October 1946

General characteristics
- Class & type: Action-class patrol boat
- Displacement: 1,375 long tons (1,397 t)
- Length: 205 ft (62 m)
- Beam: 33 ft (10 m)
- Draft: 14 ft 7 in (4.45 m)
- Propulsion: 2 × 3-drum express boilers; 2,750 ihp (2,051 kW) Canadian Vickers vertical triple expansion engine; 1 shaft
- Speed: 16.5 kn (19.0 mph; 30.6 km/h)
- Complement: 90
- Armament: 2 × 3"/50 dual-purpose gun mounts; 2 × 20 mm gun mounts; 2 × depth charge tracks

HMS Flax, a modified Flower-class corvette, was laid down on 28 February 1942 at Kingston, Ontario, Canada, by War Supplies Ltd., for the Royal Navy. Launched on 15 June 1942 it was reallocated to the United States under the so-called "Reverse Lend-Lease" program and renamed and redesignated Brisk (PG-89) on 14 August 1942. Completed on 5 December 1942, the ship was commissioned on 6 December 1942.

== Service history ==
She departed Kingston on 7 December bound for Montreal and reached that city on the 10th. Four days later, she sailed for Quebec, arriving on the 16th. There, the remaining work to complete the ship for service was carried out. On 8 January 1943, Brisk headed for Boston in company with Might by way of Halifax, Nova Scotia. Upon her arrival at the Boston Navy Yard, Brisk underwent repairs and alterations. Once this work was completed, the gunboat commenced her shakedown on 26 February. Then, after three days of anti-submarine warfare training out of New London, she reached New York City on 10 March.

Soon thereafter, Brisk commenced escorting convoys between New York and Guantanamo Bay, Cuba, a prosaic but highly important duty that kept her employed through V-E Day in the spring of 1945. Brisk saw action on 1 August 1943 while escorting Convoy NG-376 30 miles west of Great Inagua. She drove down U-boat U-732 that was lying in wait for the convoy, allowing it to pass unmolested. Upon the conclusion of her last convoy mission, with GN-204 (Guantanamo to New York) – which reached New York on 15 May 1945 – Brisk sailed for Norfolk, Virginia, on 11 June. She continued south from there on 23 June and arrived in Charleston, South Carolina, two days later.

Brisk served at Charleston into the autumn of 1945. She was decommissioned there on 9 October 1945, and her name was struck from the Navy list on 24 October 1945. Transferred to the War Shipping Administration on 18 October 1946 for disposal, she was operated in mercantile service into the mid-1950s, initially retaining her name Brisk. Later, however, she was documented under the names Ariana (1951) and Arvida Bay (1955).
