= HMS Candytuft (K09) =

Flower-class corvette

History

United Kingdom
- Name: HMS Candytuft
- Namesake: Candytuft
- Builder: Grangemouth Dry Dock, Grangemouth
- Laid down: 31 October 1939
- Launched: 8 July 1940
- Commissioned: 16 October 1940
- Decommissioned: 4 March 1942
- Identification: Pennant number: K09
- Fate: Transferred to United States Navy

United States
- Name: USS Tenacity
- Commissioned: 11 June 1942
- Decommissioned: 22 August 1945
- Identification: Hull number: PG-71
- Fate: Returned to Royal Navy

United Kingdom
- Name: HMS Candytuft
- Commissioned: 26 August 1945
- Decommissioned: September 1945
- Fate: Sold into civilian service, 1946

General characteristics
- Class & type: Flower-class corvette
- Displacement: 925 long tons (940 t; 1,036 short tons)
- Length: 205 ft (62.48 m)o/a
- Beam: 33 ft 2 in (10.11 m)
- Draught: 13 ft 7 in (4.14 m)
- Propulsion: single shaft; 2 × fire tube Scotch boilers; 1 × 4-cycle triple-expansion reciprocating steam engine; 2,750 ihp (2,050 kW)
- Speed: 16.5 knots (30.6 km/h)
- Range: 3,500 nautical miles (6,482 km) at 12 knots (22.2 km/h)
- Complement: 85
- Sensors & processing systems: 1 × SW1C or 2C radar; 1 × Type 123A or Type 127DV sonar
- Armament: 1 × 4-inch BL Mk.IX single gun; 2 × .50 cal machine gun (twin); 2 × Lewis .303 cal machine gun (twin); 2 × Mk.II depth charge throwers; 2 × Depth charge rails with 40 depth charges; originally fitted with minesweeping gear, later removed

HMS Candytuft was a Flower-class corvette, built for the Royal Navy during the Second World War, and was in service in the Battle of the Atlantic. In 1942 she was transferred to the United States Navy as part of the reverse Lend Lease arrangement and renamed USS Tenacity, one of the Temptress-class gunboats. With the end of hostilities she was returned to the Royal Navy and sold into mercantile service.

== Service history ==
Candytuft was built at Grangemouth Dry Dock, Grangemouth, as part of the pre-war 1939 programme. One of the original Flower-class corvettes, she was ordered on 25 July 1939, laid down three months later, and launched on 5 July 1940. She was completed on 16 October 1940.

=== Royal Navy ===
After working up, Candytuft was assigned to the Western Approaches Escort Force for service as a convoy escort. In this role she was engaged in all the duties performed by escort ships; protecting convoys, searching for and attacking U-boats which attacked ships in convoy, and rescuing survivors.

Candytuft was involved in one convoy battle. In December 1940, she was part of the escort to convoy OG 46, during which two ships were sunk. In 18 months service, she escorted 13 North Atlantic and two Gibraltar convoys, assisting in the safe passage of over 500 ships, though some were lost subsequently. In September 1941, while with HX 148 Candytuft suffered a boiler explosion. she was taken under tow to New York, where she underwent repairs, but was out of action for the next four months. In March 1942, while still at New York, Candytuft was transferred to the United States Navy.

=== United States Navy ===
Following the entry of the United States into the war the US Navy was in need of anti-submarine warfare vessels, and to meet this need a number of ships were transferred from the Royal Navy as part of a reverse Lend-Lease arrangement. Candytuft was transferred on 4 March 1942, but required an extensive refit; she was finally commissioned into the USN on 11 June 1942 as USS Tenacity, one of the Temptress-class gunboats. Initially employed as a convoy escort in the Caribbean, Tenacity was moved south in September 1942 to join the US 4th Fleet, the South Atlantic escort force, based in Trinidad. After 17 months service there Tenacity was moved, in January 1944, to the Eastern Sea Frontier, based at Boston. There she was employed until the end of hostilities in August 1945, when she was returned to the Royal Navy. As Candytuft once more she was stricken in September 1945.

== Merchant service ==
Following her de-commissioning, Candytuft was sold into merchant service, and in 1948 she became the steamer Maw Hwa.
