= HMS Milfoil =

Modified Flower-class corvette

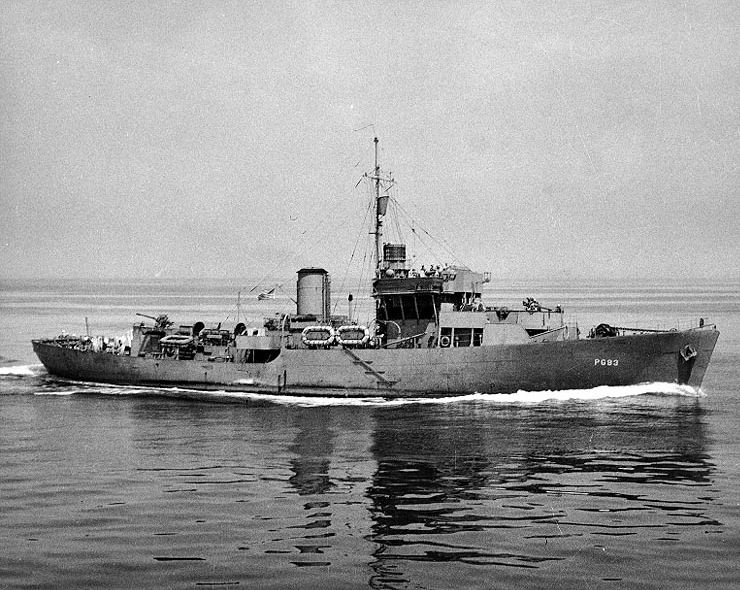
- HMS Milfoil after her transfer to the US Navy

History

United Kingdom
- Name: Milfoil
- Namesake: Achillea millefolium
- Laid down: November 1941
- Launched: 5 August 1942
- Identification: Pennant number: K288
- Fate: Transferred to the United States Navy

United States
- Name: Intensity
- Commissioned: 31 March 1943
- Decommissioned: 3 October 1945
- Fate: Sold to Balleneros Ltd. of Panama

Panama
- Name: Olympic Promoter
- Acquired: 1950
- Fate: Transferred to a Japanese Company

Japan
- Name: Otori Maru №5
- Acquired: 1965
- Fate: Broken up 1 April 1966

General characteristics
- Class & type: Flower-class corvette
- Displacement: 1,375 tons
- Length: 205 ft (62 m)
- Beam: 33 ft (10 m)
- Draught: 14 ft 7 in (4.45 m)
- Propulsion: Two 3-drum express boilers driving a Canadian Vickers VTE engine
- Speed: 16.5 knots
- Complement: 90
- Armament: 1 × 3"/50 dual purpose gun mounts

HMS Milfoil was a modified Flower-class corvette that served in the Royal Navy and the United States Navy (as USS Intensity (PG-93)) before being transferred to Panama where she served as a whaling ship.

During most of World War II, she operated from New York on escort duty to the Caribbean Sea. She completed 15 escort runs in this role. As USS Intensity, she was designated an Action-class patrol gunboat and crewed by the United States Coast Guard. She was put on patrol in New York for a month in 1944 but was later returned to escort duty in the Caribbean.

After the threat from German attack disappeared in May 1945, USS Intensity sailed to Charleston, South Carolina, arriving on 29 June 1945. She was decommissioned later that year in Charleston and put into the trust of the United States Maritime Commission.

In 1950, she was sold to a Panamanian company, Balleneros Ltd., where she was used as a whaling ship called Olympic Promoter. She was then sold to a Japanese company and renamed Otori Maru № 5.

The ship was scrapped at Shodoshima on 1 April 1966.
