= HMS Honesty =

Modified Flower-class corvette

History

United States
- Name: Caprice
- Builder: Kingston Shipbuilding Co., Kingston
- Laid down: as CN-308
- Launched: 28 September 1942
- Fate: Transferred to the Royal Navy, 28 May 1943

United Kingdom
- Name: Honesty
- Identification: Pennant number: K 285
- Fate: Returned to US custody, 5 January 1946; Sold 10 December 1946; Scrapped at Hamburg, Germany in 1961

General characteristics
- Class & type: Action class
- Type: Patrol boat
- Displacement: 1,375 long tons (1,397 t)
- Length: 205 ft (62 m)
- Beam: 33 ft (10 m)
- Draft: 14 ft 7 in (4.45 m)
- Propulsion: 4-cylinder triple expansion, one shaft
- Speed: 16.5 kn (19.0 mph; 30.6 km/h)
- Complement: 90
- Armament: 2 × 3"/50 dual purpose gun mounts; 2 × 20 mm gun mounts; 1 × Hedgehog; 4 × depth charge guns; 2 × depth charge chutes

The second USS Caprice (PG-90), formerly CN-308, was launched 28 September 1942, by Kingston Shipbuilding Co., Kingston, Ontario, Canada, for the United States Navy. Upon completion, Caprice was transferred to the Royal Navy on 28 May 1943, and commissioned as HMS Honesty.

On 5 January 1946, Honesty was returned to the United States Navy and reverted to the name Caprice. Never commissioned in the United States Navy, Caprice was sold on 10 December 1946.
