= HMS Rosebay =

Modified Flower-class corvette in the British Royal Navy

History

United States
- Name: Splendor
- Builder: Kingston Shipbuilding Co., Kingston
- Launched: 1 February 1943
- Fate: Transferred to the Royal Navy

United Kingdom
- Name: Rosebay
- Commissioned: 28 July 1943
- Identification: Pennant number: K286
- Fate: Returned to US Navy custody 20 March 1946, sold commercial, scrapped 1954

General characteristics
- Class & type: Action-class patrol boat
- Displacement: 1,375 long tons (1,397 t)
- Length: 205 ft (62 m)
- Beam: 33 ft (10 m)
- Draft: 14 ft 7 in (4.45 m)
- Propulsion: two 3-drum express boilers, 2,750ihp vertical triple expansion Canadian Vickers engine, one shaft.
- Speed: 16.5 kn (19.0 mph; 30.6 km/h)
- Complement: 90
- Armament: 2 × 3"/50 dual purpose gun mounts; 2 × 20 mm gun mounts; 1 × Hedgehog; 4 × depth charge guns; 2 × depth charge chutes

HMS Rosebay (previously known as Splendor (PG-97)) was a Flower-class corvette built for World War II. She was disposed of soon after the war.

== History ==
Splendor (PG-97) was launched for the United States Navy on 11 February 1943 by the Kingston Shipbuilding Co., Kingston, Ont., Canada. However, upon completion, Splendor was transferred to the Royal Navy on 28 July 1943 and commissioned as HMS Rosebay. On 20 March 1946 she was returned to the United States Navy. Never commissioned in the United States Navy, Splendor was transferred to the Maritime Commission on 19 November 1946 for disposal.
