= German submarine U-1004 =

German World War II submarine

- U-995 Type VIIC/41 at the Laboe Naval Memorial. This U-boat is almost identical to U-1004.

History

Nazi Germany
- Name: U-1004
- Ordered: 14 October 1941
- Builder: Blohm & Voss AG, Hamburg
- Yard number: 204
- Laid down: 15 January 1943
- Launched: 27 October 1943
- Commissioned: 16 December 1943
- Fate: Surrendered on 9 May 1945 at Bergen, Norway; Sunk on 1 December 1945 during Operation Deadlight

General characteristics (VIIC/41)
- Class & type: Type VIIC/41 submarine
- Displacement: 759 tonnes (747 long tons) surfaced; 860 t (846 long tons) submerged
- Length: 67.23 m (220 ft 7 in) o/a; 50.50 m (165 ft 8 in) pressure hull
- Beam: 6.20 m (20 ft 4 in) o/a; 4.70 m (15 ft 5 in) pressure hull
- Height: 9.60 m (31 ft 6 in)
- Draught: 4.74 m (15 ft 7 in)
- Installed power: 2,800–3,200 PS (2,100–2,400 kW; 2,800–3,200 bhp) (diesels); 750 PS (550 kW; 740 shp) (electric)
- Propulsion: 2 shafts; 2 × diesel engines; 2 × electric motors
- Speed: 17.7 knots (32.8 km/h; 20.4 mph) surfaced; 7.6 knots (14.1 km/h; 8.7 mph) submerged
- Range: 8,500 nmi (15,700 km; 9,800 mi) at 10 knots (19 km/h; 12 mph) surfaced; 80 nmi (150 km; 92 mi) at 4 knots (7.4 km/h; 4.6 mph) submerged
- Test depth: 230 m (750 ft); Calculated crush depth: 250–295 m (820–968 ft)
- Complement: 44-52 officers & ratings
- Armament: 5 × 53.3 cm (21 in) torpedo tubes (4 bow, 1 stern); 14 × torpedoes; 1 × 8.8 cm (3.46 in) deck gun (220 rounds); 1 × 3.7 cm (1.5 in) Flak M42 AA gun; 2 × 2 cm (0.79 in) C/30 AA guns

Service record
- Part of: 31st U-boat Flotilla; 16 December 1943 – 31 July 1944; 7th U-boat Flotilla; 1 August – 31 October 1944; 11th U-boat Flotilla; 1 November 1944 – 8 May 1945
- Identification codes: M 34 668
- Commanders: Oblt.z.S. Hartmuth Schimmelpfennig; 16 December 1943 – January 1945; Oblt.z.S. Rudolf Hinz; January – 9 May 1945
- Operations: 2 patrols: 1st patrol: a. 29 August – 23 October 1944; b. 26 – 27 October 1944; c. 2 – 11 January 1945; 2nd patrol: 27 January – 20 March 1945
- Victories: 1 merchant ship sunk (1,313 GRT); 1 warship sunk (980 tons)

German submarine U-1004 was a Type VIIC/41 U-boat built for Nazi Germany's Kriegsmarine for service during World War II. She was laid down on 15 January 1943 by Blohm & Voss, Hamburg as yard number 204, launched on 27 October 1943 and commissioned on 16 December 1943 under Oberleutnant zur See Hartmuth Schimmelpfennig.

== Design ==
Like all Type VIIC/41 U-boats, U-1004 had a displacement of 759 tonnes (747 long tons) when at the surface and 860 tonnes (850 long tons) while submerged. She had a total length of 67.23 m (220 ft 7 in), a pressure hull length of 50.50 m (165 ft 8 in), a beam of 6.20 m (20 ft 4 in), and a draught of 4.74 m (15 ft 7 in). The submarine was powered by two Germaniawerft F46 supercharged six-cylinder four-stroke diesel engines producing a total of 2,800 to 3,200 metric horsepower (2,060 to 2,350 kW; 2,760 to 3,160 shp) and two BBC GG UB 720/8 double-acting electric motors producing a total of 750 metric horsepower (550 kW; 740 shp) for use while submerged. The boat was capable of operating at a depth of 250 metres (820 ft).

The submarine had a maximum surface speed of 17.7 knots (32.8 km/h; 20.4 mph) and a submerged speed of 7.6 knots (14.1 km/h; 8.7 mph). When submerged, the boat could operate for 80 nautical miles (150 km; 92 mi) at 4 knots (7.4 km/h; 4.6 mph); when surfaced, she could travel 8,500 nautical miles (15,700 km; 9,800 mi) at 10 knots (19 km/h; 12 mph). U-1004 was fitted with five 53.3 cm (21 in) torpedo tubes (four fitted at the bow and one at the stern), fourteen torpedoes or 26 TMA or TMB Naval mines, one 8.8 cm (3.46 in) SK C/35 naval gun, (220 rounds), one 3.7 cm (1.5 in) Flak M42 and two 2 cm (0.79 in) C/30 anti-aircraft guns. Its complement was between forty-four and sixty.

== Service history ==
The boat's service career began on 16 December 1943 with the 31st Training Flotilla, followed by active service with 7th Flotilla on 1 August 1944, then 11th Flotilla on 1 November 1944. U-1004 took part in no wolfpacks. U-1004 was sunk by naval gunfire on 1 December 1945 in the North Atlantic, in position 56°10′N 10°05′W, as part of Operation Deadlight.

== Summary of raiding history ==
Date	Ship Name	Nationality	Tonnage (Note: Merchant ship tonnages are in gross register tons. Military vessels are listed by tons displacement.)	Fate
22 February 1945	Alexander Kennedy	United Kingdom	1,313	Sunk
22 February 1945	HMCS Trentonian	Royal Canadian Navy	980	Sunk

== See also ==
- Battle of the Atlantic

== Bibliography ==
- Busch, Rainer; Röll, Hans-Joachim (1999). German U-boat commanders of World War II : a biographical dictionary. Translated by Brooks, Geoffrey. London, Annapolis, Md: Greenhill Books, Naval Institute Press. ISBN 1-55750-186-6.
- Gröner, Erich; Jung, Dieter; Maass, Martin (1991). German Warships 1815–1945, U-boats and Mine Warfare Vessels. Vol. 2. Translated by Thomas, Keith; Magowan, Rachel. London: Conway Maritime Press. ISBN 0-85177-593-4.
