= USS Might =

Gunboat of the United States Navy

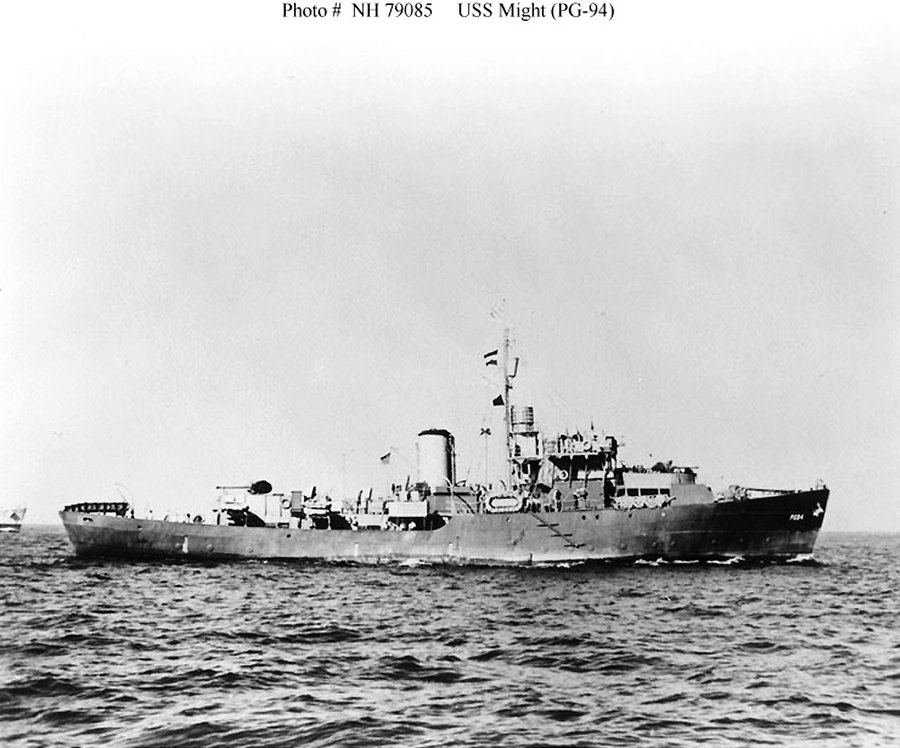

History

United Kingdom
- Name: HMS Musk
- Builder: Morton Engineering & Dry Dock Co., Quebec City
- Laid down: 2 November 1941 as Canadian Corvette CN-312
- Launched: 15 July 1942
- Identification: Pennant number: K289
- Fate: Transferred to the US Navy, 20 July 1942

United States
- Name: USS Might (PG-94)
- Commissioned: 15 July 1942
- Decommissioned: 9 October 1945
- Stricken: 24 October 1945
- Fate: Sold into mercantile service, scrapped 1975

General characteristics
- Class & type: Action-class patrol boat
- Displacement: 1,375 long tons (1,397 t)
- Length: 205 ft (62 m)
- Beam: 33 ft (10 m)
- Draft: 14 ft 7 in (4.45 m)
- Propulsion: 2 × 3-drum express boilers; 2,750 ihp (2,051 kW) Canadian Vickers vertical triple expansion engine; 1 shaft
- Speed: 16.5 kn (19.0 mph; 30.6 km/h)
- Complement: 90
- Armament: 2 × 3"/50 dual-purpose gun mounts; 2 × 20 mm gun mounts; 1 × Hedgehog anti-submarine mortar; 4 × depth charge projectors; 2 × depth charge tracks

USS Might (PG-94) was laid down as Canadian corvette CN-312 by Morton Engineering and Drydock Co., Ltd., Quebec, Canada, on 28 November 1941 and launched as HMS Musk on 15 July 1942. The ship was transferred to the United States Navy on 20 July 1942, renamed Might on 14 August 1942, and commissioned at Quebec on 22 December 1942.

== Service history ==
After fitting out and shakedown from Boston, Might reported to the Eastern Sea Frontier on 10 March 1943 at New York City for convoy escort duty. Sailing primarily to Cuba and occasionally to Key West, she continued this duty after transferring to the Coast Guard on 27 June.

During the next 18 months, Might completed 21 voyages to Cuba and two to Key West. The protection she provided made it possible for this vital coastwise and Caribbean traffic to continue despite German submarine menace and freed larger destroyer types for the hunter-killer operations which defeated the U‑boats in the Atlantic. In November 1944, and continuously from 9 January to 1 May 1945, Might served week-long barrier patrols in the western Atlantic.

After anti-submarine exercises out of her Staten Island base, Might arrived Charleston, S.C., on 28 June and decommissioned there on 9 October 1945. Her name was struck from the Navy list on 24 October 1945, and she was delivered to the Maritime Commission on 18 October 1946 for immediate transfer to her purchaser, United Boat Service Corp., City Island, N.Y.

== Post-war ==
From 1950 to 1956 she was owned as Olympic Explorer by Balleneros Ltd., S.A., Panama, and sailed as a commercial whale chaser. Then sold to a Japanese shipping company, she was renamed Otori Maru No. 3, and in 1957 was renamed Kyo Marti No. 12.
