= Percy W. Nelles =

Royal Canadian Navy admiral (1892-1951)

Percy Walker Nelles
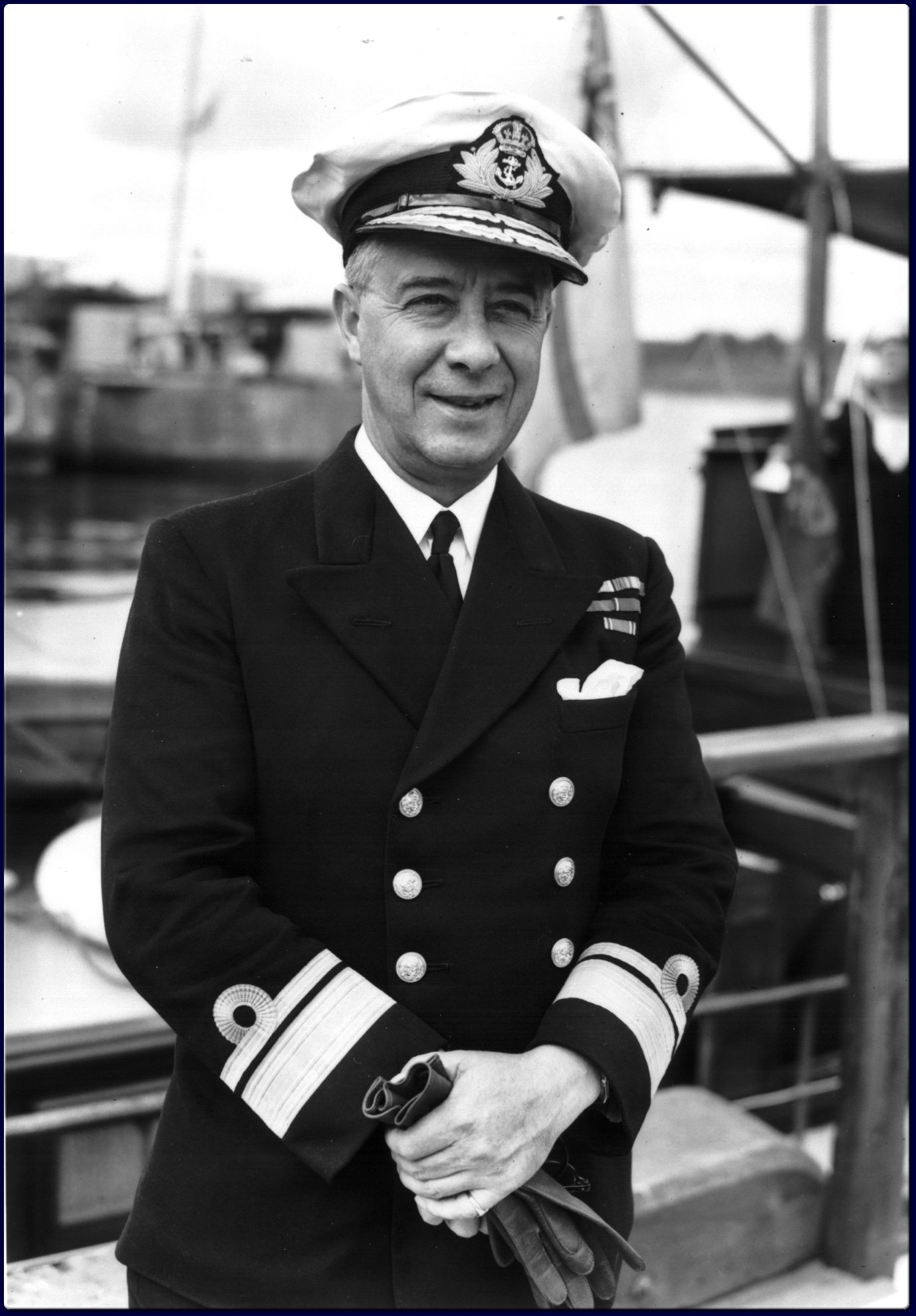
- Rear-Admiral Percy Walker Nelles, RCN, Chief of the Naval Staff, in Halifax, Nova Scotia, September 1940.
- Born: 7 January 1892; Brantford, Ontario, Canada
- Died: 13 June 1951 (aged 59); Victoria, British Columbia, Canada
- Relatives: Son of BGen Charles M. Nelles, CMG
- Military career
- Allegiance: Canada
- Branch: Royal Canadian Navy
- Rank: Admiral
- Commands: Chief of the Naval Staff
- Conflicts: First World War; Second World War Battle of the Atlantic Battle of the St. Lawrence Operation Overlord
- Awards: Companion of the Order of the Bath Legion of Merit

Admiral Percy Walker Nelles, CB (7 January 1892 – 13 July 1951) was a flag officer in the Royal Canadian Navy (RCN) and the Chief of the Naval Staff from 1 January 1934 to 15 January 1944. He oversaw the massive wartime expansion of the RCN and the transformation of Canada into a major player in the Battle of the Atlantic. During his tenure U-boats raided the Gulf of St. Lawrence, Canadian Northwest Atlantic command was created, and the RCN provided up to 40% of all escort forces in the North Atlantic. His handling of the RCN's war effort had its opponents however, and he was removed from his post as Chief of the Naval Staff in January 1944. He was sent to London as Overseas Naval Attaché, coordinating RCN operations for Operation Overlord. He retired in January 1945 as a full admiral.

== Early life ==
Nelles was born in Brantford, Ontario, on 7 January 1892, the son of Brigadier General Charles Mecklan Nelles, CMG (1865–1936) and great-great grandson of Col. Robert Nelles. As a child, Nelles attended the private schools Lakefield Preparatory School and then Trinity College School in Port Hope. As a child he was known to play with boats on the Grand River and wanted to be a part of the navy all of his life. Brigadier General Nelles wrote to the Minister of Marine and Fisheries for an appointment for Percy in the future Canadian naval service. Nelles enlisted as a cadet in the Fisheries Protection Service in 1909. He joined the Fisheries Protection Service as the second of the first seven cadets in anticipation of the formation of the Canadian navy. Nelles first assignment was to CGS Canada, the new Canadian fisheries protection vessel in 1910.

== Naval career ==
In 1910, Nelles transferred to the nascent RCN and became a midshipman aboard Canada's new cruiser HMCS Niobe. Over the next two decades he would rise from the rank of sub-lieutenant to the rank of captain as the Assistant Chief of Naval Staff. Due to the small size of the RCN, Canadian officers were sent to train on larger ships of the British Royal Navy to gain experience. In December 1911, Nelles joined the battleship HMS Dreadnought. In early 1914, Nelles transferred to the cruiser HMS Suffolk, which was assigned to the North America and West Indies Station based at Bermuda. In early 1914 Suffolk was sent to protect British interests in Mexico during the civil war. With the breakout of the First World War, Suffolk was ordered to protect transatlantic shipping routes, then later patrolled between Bermuda and Halifax, Nova Scotia. Nelles remained aboard the British cruiser until April 1917, when he was recalled to Ottawa, Ontario. There, he served as flag lieutenant to the first head of the RCN, Admiral Sir Charles Kingsmill. In 1920, Nelles entered the Royal Naval College, was promoted to lieutenant commander in 1922 and served in several Royal Navy establishments over the next two years before returning to Canada in 1925.

In August 1925 Nelles returned to Canada and was promoted to commander and appointed senior naval officer, Esquimalt in December. He returned to the United Kingdom in 1929. On 18 March 1930 he was appointed executive officer aboard the recently refitted Danae-class cruiser HMS Dragon. In mid-1930 Dragon set off from HMD Bermuda on a three-month tour of South America's Atlantic and Pacific coasts. After having rounded Cape Horn her captain, L.H.B. Bevan, died unexpectedly. Nelles then assumed temporary command of Dragon. After consultation with the Admiralty, Nelles was appointed acting captain and continued Dragon's tour, being the first RCN officer to command a Royal Navy vessel.

Nelles returned to Canada in 1931, reverting to the rank of commander. Due to favourable reports by his British commanders after the Dragon cruise and his seniority among Canadian officers, the Chief of the Naval Staff, Commodore Walter Hose recommended Nelles to be his successor. In May, he was appointed to the command of the RCN's newest destroyer HMCS Saguenay. He was also made Senior Officer of the Canadian Destroyer Flotilla, which comprised four destroyers. Nelles remained in the position until 1933, when he departed for the United Kingdom for a period at the Imperial Defence College. In 1933, Nelles was given command of HMCS Stadacona, the RCN shore establishment at Halifax. The minimum rank for the position of Chief of Naval Staff was captain and Commodore Hose recommended Nelles for early promotion to the rank in 1931. However, due to financial constraints imposed by the government at the time, Hose was unable to get the promotion to go through. Nelles was eventually promoted to captain in January 1933 and was the first person in RCN history to be affirmed in the rank. Nelles was made acting Chief of the Naval Staff in December 1933 and in July 1934 was confirmed in the position and was promoted to commodore. Nelles was promoted to rear admiral in 1938.

=== World War II ===
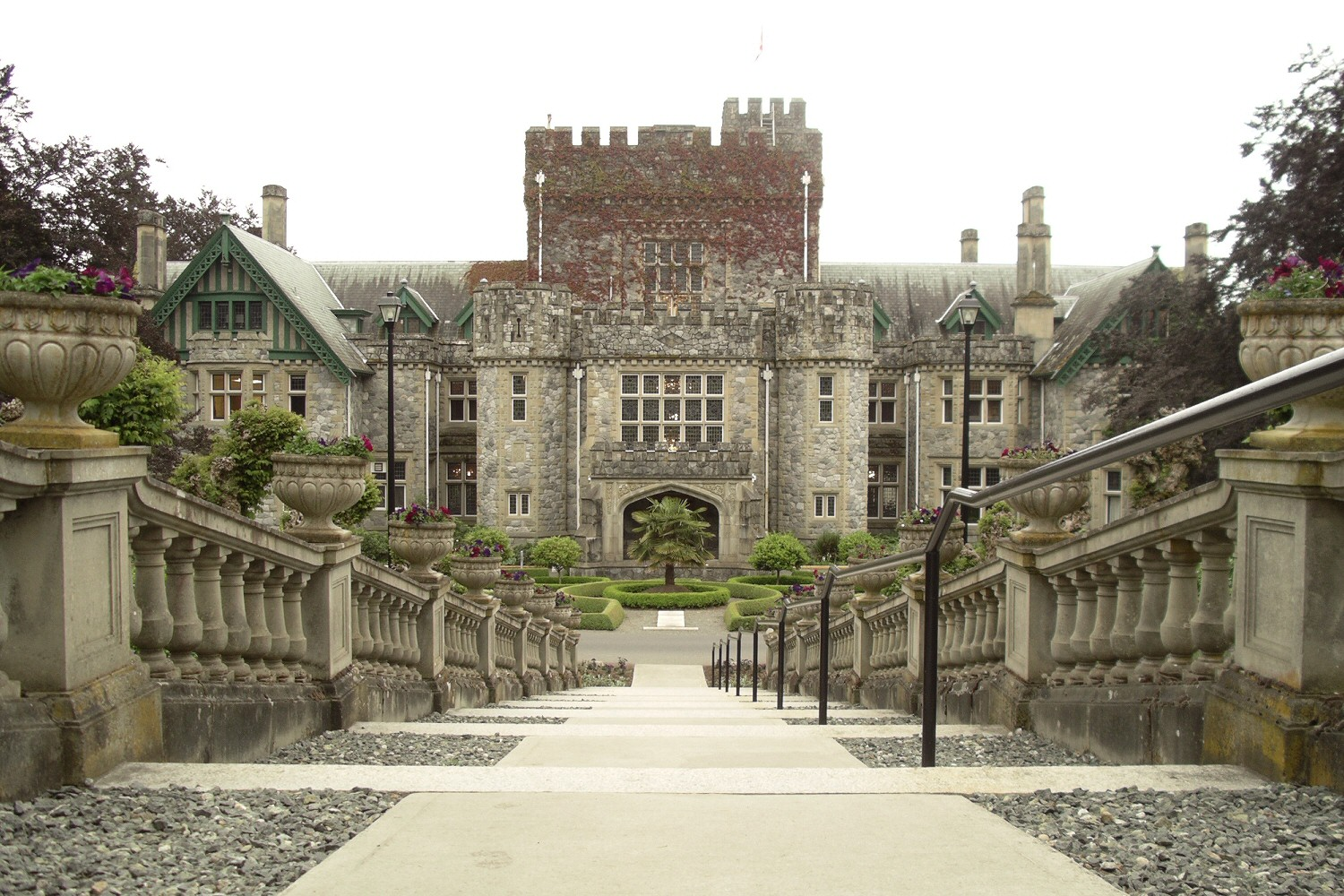
Hatley Castle

In 1940, Rear Admiral Percy W. Nelles, as Chief of the Naval Staff, led a group of Royal Naval College of Canada alumni who met with Angus Lewis Macdonald, then naval minister to discuss opening a college to train naval officers for the postwar navy and for civilian employment in the merchant marine. The college was to be similar to the Britannia Royal Naval College at Dartmouth and to the former RNCC. In 1940, Angus Lewis Macdonald explained to the House of Commons "it will be a proud day for this country, when our Canadian naval effort will be directed by Canadian men, trained in Canada and operating in ships built in this country."

In November 1940, the Hatley Park and grounds was purchased by the Royal Canadian Navy for $75,000 to house a Naval Training Establishment, later Royal Roads Military College, now Royal Roads University. Nelles was promoted to vice admiral. In 1942, at the official opening of the Royal Roads Military College, Vice-Admiral Percey Nelles, Chief of the Naval Staff said:

"While you are here, work hard and play hard, and make yourself tougher than any enemy you will ever meet."

In the 1943 New Year Honours, King George VI appointed Nelles as a Companion of the Order of the Bath. Nelles was the highest-ranking officer in the Royal Canadian Navy until January 1944, at which point he was relieved of his duties by the Minister of National Defence for the Naval Service, Angus Lewis Macdonald, following numerous conflicts regarding the management and training of Canadian naval officers. Rather than being publicly dismissed from duty, Nelles was transferred to Great Britain and given the nominal post of Senior Canadian Flag Officer Overseas (SCFO(O)), a largely administrative position with little involvement in naval operations. Upon his retirement from the RCN, Nelles was promoted to admiral.

== Private life ==
Nelles retired to Victoria, British Columbia. In 1946, Nelles was awarded the Legion of Merit with the rank of commander by the United States. In May 1951, Nelles became ill and died on 13 June. He was survived by his wife and two sons. He was buried at sea by HMCS Sault Ste. Marie.

== Legacy ==
Royal Canadian Sea Cadets Corps 'ADMIRAL NELLES' was formed in 1940 to honour the Chief of the Naval Staff. This cadet unit, located in Brantford, and is currently under the command of Lieutenant(N) S, Downey, CD with approximately 55 cadets. Additionally, the barracks at Naden, CFB Esquimalt, is named in his honour, called Nelles Block. Cadets at Royal Roads Military College were awarded the Nelles Trophy for athletics (running).

== Awards and decorations ==
Nelles's personal awards and decorations include the following:

Ribbon	Description	Notes
	Companion of the Order of the Bath (CB)	Decoration awarded 9 January 1943 as per Canada Gazette and 2 June 1943 in the London Gazette
	1914-15 Star	WWI 1914-1918
	British War Medal	WWI 1914-1918
	Victory Medal (United Kingdom)	WWI 1914-1918
	Defence Medal (United Kingdom)	WWII 1939-1945
	Canadian Volunteer Service Medal	with Overseas Service bar
	War Medal 1939–1945	WWII 1939-1945
	King George V Silver Jubilee Medal	Decoration awarded on 6 May 1935
	King George VI Coronation Medal	Decoration awarded on 12 May 1937
	Commander of the Legion of Merit	Decoration awarded 3 August 1946 As per the Canada Gazette and on 27 June 1946 in the London Gazette; Commander level; United States award
	Legion of Honour	Decoration awarded 27 November 1946; Commander level; France award
	Croix de Guerre 1939–1945 with palm	Decoration awarded on 27 November 1946; France award
	Order of St. Olav	Decoration awarded on 1 December 1948; (Norway) Norwegian award

== Notes ==
Military offices
Preceded by Walter Hose	Chief of the Naval Staff; 1934–1944	Succeeded by George Jones
