= List of Flower-class corvettes =

This is a list of Flower-class corvettes and Modified Flower-class corvettes. It should be stressed that all ships were initially built for the British, Canadian, French and American navies, so that all mentions of other nations' navies refer to ships which were transferred to those countries later in their lives.

== Fate ==
A total of 294 Flower-class corvettes were built during the Second World War for the Royal Navy, Royal Canadian Navy, Free French Naval Forces, and several other Allied navies. The majority survived the war, though several were lost in combat or by accident. The following table summarises their ultimate fates:

Fate of Flower-class Corvettes Built During the Second World War
Fate	Number	Notes
Sunk by submarine	22	Torpedoed by U-boats, primarily in the North Atlantic
Sunk by mine	5	Lost to naval mines, mostly in European coastal waters
Sunk by aircraft	4	Attacked and sunk by Axis aircraft, notably in the Mediterranean
Lost in accidents	5	Included collisions, groundings, or loss during trials
Total lost during the war	36	Combined losses from enemy action and non-combat causes
Survived the war	258	Sold into mercantile service, scrapped, or transferred to other navies
Preserved as museum ship	1	HMCS Sackville, preserved in Halifax, Nova Scotia

== Argentine Navy ==
- República; ex-HMS Smilax, USS Tact, acquired from USA 1948, converted to anti-submarine warfare training ship, served until 1965, broken up 1970.
- Capitan Canepa; ex-Gasestado, HMCS Barrie, purchased 1954, converted to survey ship, in service 1955–1972, broken up 1973.

== Free Belgian Forces ==
The Belgian Navy in exile operated two Flower-class corvettes under Royal Navy control between 1942 and 1944.

- HMS Godetia, in service Feb 1942 to Dec 1944. Returned to RN.
- HMS Buttercup, in service April 1942 to Dec 1944. Transferred to RNoN.

== Chilean Navy ==
- Chipana; ex-HMCS Strathroy, purchased from Canada 1946, used as survey ship, decommissioned 1966.
- Casma; ex-HMCS Stellarton, purchased from Canada 1946, decommissioned 1967.
- Papudo; ex-HMCS Thorlock, purchased from Canada 1946, decommissioned 1965, scrapped 1967.

== Republic of China Navy ==
- Fu Po; ex-HMS Petunia, purchased January 1946, sunk 19 March 1947 after collision with merchant vessel in the Formosa Strait.

== Chinese People's Liberation Army Navy ==
- Kaifeng; ex-Cloverlock, HMS Clover, survey vessel 1949 to 1989.
- Linyi; ex-Ziang Teh, Heliolock, USS Surprise, HMS Heliotrope, 1949 to 1979.
- <??> ex-Maw Hwa, USS Tenacity, HMS Candytuft.

== Danish Navy ==
- Thetis; ex-HMS Geranium, purchased 1945, commissioned 1948, reclassified from corvette to frigate 1951, decommissioned 1962, scrapped 1963.

== Dominican Navy ==
- Cristobal Colon; ex-HMCS Lachute, in service 1946 to 1979.
- Gerard Jansen; ex-HMCS Peterborough, in service 1947 to 1972.
- Juan Alejandro Acosta; ex-HMCS Louisburg, in service 1947 to 1979.
- Juan Bautista Cambioso; ex-HMCS Belleville, in service 1947 to 1972.
- Juan Bautista Maggiolo; ex-HMCS Riviere du Loup, in service 1947 to 1972.

== Egyptian Navy ==
- El Sudan; ex-HMS Mallow, commissioned RN 1940, in Yugoslav service 1944–1948, renamed Nada, and for a short period Partizanka, resold to Egypt 1948, paid off 1970.

== French Navy ==
Four Flower Class corvettes ordered for the French Navy were launched by Smith's Dock in early 1940. The following orders were taken up by the Royal Navy.

- La Malouine, launched 21 March 1940, completed 30 July 1940 and transferred to RN under same name, broken up 22 May 1947.
- La Bastiaise, launched 8 April 1940. Mined off Hartlepool, 22 June 1940 on a trials tour under French command.
- La Dieppoise, launched 21 June 1940, completed as HMS Fleur de Lys, commissioned RN 26 August 1940, torpedoed by U-206 in the North Atlantic 14 October 1941. (Note: These ships were torpedoed by U-boats.)
- La Paimpolaise, launched 4 July 1940 and completed 26 September 1940 as HMS Nasturtium, RN. Sold to Greece 1948 and renamed Cania, later lighthouse tender St. Lykoudis.

== Free French Naval Forces ==
Nine corvettes built for the Royal Navy were commissioned into the Free French Naval Forces on completion:

- Aconit; ex-HMS Aconite, commissioned 23 July 1941, returned to RN 30 April 1947.
- Alysse; ex-HMS Alyssum, commissioned 17 June 1941, sunk 9 February 1942, 36 men lost.
- Commandant Detroyant; ex-HMS Coriander, commissioned 16 September 1941, returned to RN 1947.
- Commandant Drogou; ex-HMS Chrysanthemum, commissioned 26 January 1942, returned to RN May 1947.
- Commandant d'Estienne d'Orves; ex-HMS Lotus, commissioned 23 May 1942, returned to RN 31 May 1947.
- Lobelia; ex-HMS Lobelia, commissioned 16 July 1941, returned to RN April 1947.
- Mimosa; ex-HMS Mimosa, commissioned 11 May 1941, sunk 9 June 1942, 64 men lost.
- Renoncule; ex-HMS Ranunculus, commissioned 28 July 1941, returned to RN 1947.
- Roselys; ex-HMS Sundew, commissioned 19 September 1941, returned to RN 1947.

== Greek Navy ==
- Apostolis; ex-HMS Hyacinth, commissioned RN October 1940, handed over to Royal Hellenic Navy 24 October 1943, returned to RN 1952 and scrapped.
- Kriezis; ex-HMS Coreopsis, commissioned RN August 1940, handed over 10 November 1943, returned to RN 1 June 1952 and scrapped in July.
- Sakhtouris; ex-HMS Peony, commissioned RN August 1940, handed over 1943, returned to RN September 1951 and scrapped in April 1952.
- Tompazis; ex-HMS Tamarisk, commissioned RN December 1941, handed over November 1943, returned to RN 1952 and scrapped in March 1952.

== Irish Naval Service ==
- Cliona; ex-HMS Bellwort, commissioned RN 20 November 1941. Sold to Ireland 3 February 1947. Scrapped November 1970.
- Macha; ex-HMS Borage, commissioned RN 29 April 1942. Sold to Ireland 15 November 1946. Scrapped November 1970.
- Maev; ex-HMS Oxlip, commissioned RN 28 December 1941. Sold to Ireland 20 December 1946. Scrapped March 1972.

== Israeli Navy ==
- Wedgwood; ex-HMCS Beauharnois, Josiah Wedgwood, in service 1948 to 1956.
- INS Haganah; ex-HMCS Norsyd, in service 1948 to 1956.

== Italian Navy ==
- Elbano; (Note: These ships belonged to the Modified Flower class.) ex-USS Prudent, ordered as HMS Privet (K291), sold to Italy in 1949, converted to hydrographic survey vessel and renamed Staffetta (A5307) in 1951, paid off 1970.

== Royal Netherlands Navy ==
- Friso; ex-HMS Carnation, first commissioned RN 16 October 1940, in service from 26 March 1943 to 4 October 1944.

== Royal Norwegian Navy ==
Wartime

- Eglantine; ex-HMS Eglantine, commissioned as HNoMS 29 August 1941, in 1946 bought and renamed Sørøy, used for fishery protection, in 1956 sold for conversion to diesel-driven whale catcher Thorglimt, scrapped 1969.
- Montbretia; ex-HMS Montbretia, commissioned as HNoMS 29 September 1941, on 18 November 1942 torpedoed and sunk, 48 men lost.
- Acanthus; ex-HMS Acanthus, commissioned as HNoMS 1 October 1941, bought 1946, renamed "Andenes", used for fishery protection and reclassified to Frigate F307 in 1950, sold 1956 to South Africa for conversion to whale catcher Colin Frye, resold 1960 to Japan and renamed Toshi Maru No.2, scrapped 1970.
- Rose; ex-HMS Rose, commissioned as HNoMS 26 October 1941, lost 26 October 1944 after a collision with a destroyer, 3 men lost.
- Potentilla; ex-HMS Potentilla, commissioned as HNoMS 16 January 1942, returned to Royal Navy 13 March 1944, sold for scrapping March 1946.
- Nordkyn; ex-HMS Buttercup, first commissioned RN on 24 April 1942, transferred to Norway 20 December 1944, bought 1946 and renamed Nordkyn, used for fishery protection, 1957 sold for conversion to diesel-driven whale catcher Thoris, scrapped 1969.

Post-war

- Saxifrage; first commissioned 6 February 1942, transferred in August 1947 to Norway and used as weather ship Polarfront, scrapped.
- Bryony; first commissioned 15 March 1941, transferred in August 1947 to Norway and used as weather ship Polarfront II, scrapped 1979.

== Portuguese Navy ==
- Bengo; ex-HMCS Whitby, acquired with US support April 1948 and transferred to the Mozambique Pilots on 1 October 1948.
- Caravalho Araújo; ex-HMS Chrysanthemum and French corvette Commandant Drogou, sold 1947 and rebuilt as buoy boat Terje 10. Bought 1959 by Portugal, and used as survey vessel. 1975 to Angola.

== Royal Canadian Navy ==
64 vessels were built under the 1939-1940 Programme including 10 originally built for the Royal Navy, but transferred to the RCN on loan:

- Agassiz; built by Burrard Dry Dock, launched 15 August 1940 and completed 23 January 1941. Sold 1946.
- Alberni; built by Yarrows, Esquimault, launched 22 August 1940 and completed 4 February 1941. Sunk by German submarine U-480 in the English Channel 21 August 1944.
- Algoma; built by Port Arthur Shipbuilding, launched 17 December 1940 and completed 11 July 1941. Transferred to Venezuelan Navy as Constitución in 1946.
- Amherst; built by St John Drydock, launched 4 December 1940 and completed 5 August 1941. Transferred to Venezuelan Navy as Federación in 1946.
- Arrowhead; ex-HMS Arrowhead, built by Marine Industries, Sorel, launched 8 August 1940 and completed 21 November 1940. Returned to Royal Navy June 1945. Sold for mercantile service May 1947, renamed Southern Larkspur whale catcher.
- Arvida; built by Morton, launched 21 September 1940 and completed 22 May 1941. Sold for mercantile service 1946, renamed La Ceiba.
- Baddeck; built by Davie Shipbuilding, Quebec, launched 20 November 1940 and completed 18 May 1941. Sold for mercantile service 1946, renamed Efthalia.
- Barrie; built by Collingwood Shipyards, launched 23 November 1940 and completed 12 May 1941. Transferred to Argentina as Gasestado, 1946.
- Battleford; built by Collingwood Shipyards, launched 15 April 1941 and completed 31 July 1941. Transferred to Venezuelan Navy as Libertad, 1946.
- Bittersweet; ex-HMS Bittersweet, built by Marine Industries, launched 12 September 1940 and completed 23 January 1941. Returned to Royal Navy on 22 June 1945. Broken up August 1949.
- Brandon; built by Davie, launched 20 April 1941 and completed 22 July 1941. Sold 1946.
- Buctouche; built by Davie, launched 20 November 1940 and completed 5 June 1941. Sold 1946.
- Camrose; built by Marine Industries, launched 16 November 1940 and completed 30 June 1941. Broken up June 1947.
- Chambly; built by Vickers, Montreal, launched 29 July 1940 and completed 18 December 1940. Sold for mercantile service 1946, converted to whale catcher Sonjia Vinke, broken up 1966.
- Chicoutimi; built by Vickers, Montreal, launched 16 October 1940 and completed 12 May 1941. Broken up June 1946.
- Chilliwack; built by Burrard Dry Dock, launched 14 September 1940 and completed 8 April 1941. Sold 1946.
- Cobalt; built by Port Arthur, launched 17 August 1940 and completed 25 November 1940. Sold for mercantile service 1946, converted to whale catcher Johanna W. Vinke, broken up 1966.
- Collingwood; built by Collingwood, launched 27 July 1940 and completed 9 November 1940. Broken up July 1950.
- Dauphin; built by Vickers, Montreal, launched 24 October 1940 and completed 17 May 1941. Sold for mercantile service 1947, renamed Cortés.
- Dawson; built by Victoria Machinery, launched 8 February 1941 and completed 6 October 1941. Foundered 22 March 1946 off Hamilton.
- Drumheller; built by Collingwood, launched 5 July 1941 and completed 13 September 1941. Sold 1946.
- Dunvegan; built at Marine Industries, launched 11 December 1940 and completed 9 September 1941. Transferred to Venezuelan Navy as Independencia, 1946.
- Edmundston; built by Yarrow, Vancouver, launched 22 February 1941 and completed 21 October 1941. Sold for mercantile service 1946, renamed Ampala.
- Eyebright; ex-HMS Eyebright, built by Vickers, Montreal, launched 22 July 1940 and completed 26 November 1940. Returned to Royal Navy 17 June 1945. Sold for mercantile service 17 May 1947, converted to whale catcher Albert W. Vinke.
- Fennel; ex-HMS Fennel, built by Marine Industries, launched 20 August 1940 and completed 15 January 1941. Returned to Royal Navy 12 June 1945. Sold for mercantile service 9 August 1946, renamed Milliam Kihl whale catcher.
- Galt; built by Collingwood, launched 28 December 1940 and completed 15 May 1941. Sold 1946.
- Hepatica; ex-HMS Hepatica, built by Davie Shipbuilding, launched 6 July 1940 and completed 12 November 1940. Returned to Royal Navy 27 June 1945. Broken up January 1948.
- Kamloops; built by Victoria Machinery, launched 7 August 1940 and completed 17 March 1941. Sold 1946.
- Kamsack; built by Port Arthur, launched 5 May 1941 and completed 4 October 1941. Transferred to Venezuelan Navy as ARV Federación, 1946.
- Kenogami; built by Port Arthur, launched 5 September 1940 and completed 29 June 1941. Sold 1946 and broken up 1950.
- Lethbridge; built by Vickers, Montreal, launched 21 November 1940 and completed 26 June 1941. Sold for mercantile service 1952, converted to whale catcher Nicolaas Vinke.
- Levis; built by G. T. Davie, launched 4 September 1940 and completed 16 May 1941. Sunk by German submarine south of Greenland 19 September 1941.
- Louisburg; built by Morton, launched 27 May 1941 and completed 29 September 1941. Sunk by torpedo from Italian aircraft off Oran 16 February 1943.
- Lunenburg; built by G. T. Davie, launched 10 July 1941 and completed 4 December 1941. Broken up June 1946.
- Matapedia; built by Morton Engineering & Drydock, launched 14 September 1940 and completed 9 May 1941. Broken up December 1950.
- Mayflower; ex-HMS Mayflower, built by Vickers, Montreal, launched 3 July 1940 and completed 9 November 1940. Broken up 1950.
- Moncton; built by St John Drydock, launched 11 August 1941 and completed 24 April 1942. Sold 1951. Converted to whale catcher Willem W. Vinke, broken up 1966.
- Moose Jaw; built by Collingwood, launched 9 April 1941 and completed 19 June 1941. Broken up September 1949.
- Morden; built by Port Arthur, launched 5 April 1941 and completed 6 September 1941. Broken up November 1956.
- Nanaimo; built by Yarrows, Esquimault, launched 28 October 1940 and completed 26 April 1941. Sold for mercantile service 1945, converted to whale catcher René W. Vinke.
- Napanee; built by Kingston, launched 31 August 1940 and completed 12 May 1941. Broken up June 1946.
- Oakville; built at Port Arthur Shipyard, launched 21 June 1941 and completed 18 November 1941. Transferred to Venezuelan Navy as Patria 1946.
- Orillia; built by Collingwood, launched 15 September 1940 and completed 29 April 1941. Broken up January 1951.
- Pictou; built by Davie Shipbuilding, launched 5 October 1940 and completed 29 April 1941. Sold for mercantile service 1949, renamed Olympic Chaser.
- Prescott; built by Kingston, launched 7 January 1941 and completed 26 June 1941. Sold 1946.
- Quesnel; built by Victoria Machinery, launched 12 November 1940 and completed 23 May 1941. Broken up 1946.
- Rimouski; built by Davie Shipbuilding, launched 3 October 1940 and completed 26 April 1941. Broken up December 1950.
- Rosthern; built by Port Arthur, launched 30 November 1940 and completed 17 June 1941. Broken up June 1946.
- Sackville; built by St John Drydock, launched 15 May 1941 and completed 30 December 1941. Became cable vessel 1956, then survey vessel 1966. Paid off December 1982 for conversion to Museum Ship at Halifax.
- Saskatoon; built by Vickers, Montreal, launched 7 November 1940 and completed 9 June 1941. Sold for mercantile service 1947, renamed Tra Los Montes, later whale catcher Olympic Fighter 1950, Otori Maru No. 6 1956, and Kyo Mary No. 20 1961.
- Shawinigan; built by G.T. Davie, launched 16 May 1941 and completed 19 September 1941. Sunk by German submarine U-1228 in Cabot Strait 25 November 1944.
- Shediac; built by Davie Shipbuilding, launched 29 April 1941 and completed 8 July 1941. Sold for commercial service 1951, converted to whale catcher Jooske W. Vinke. Broken up 1965.
- Sherbrooke; built by Marine Industries, launched 25 October 1940 and completed 5 June 1941. Broken up May 1947.
- Snowberry; ex-HMS Snowberry, built by Davie Shipbuilding, launched 8 August 1940 and completed 30 November 1940. Returned to Royal Navy 8 June 1945. Broken up August 1947.
- Sorel; built by Marine Industries, launched 16 November 1940 and completed 19 August 1941. Sold 16 October 1945.
- Spikenard; ex-HMS Spikenard, built by Davie Shipbuilding, launched 10 August 1940 and completed 8 December 1940. Sunk by German submarine U-136 in the North Atlantic 10 February 1942.
- Sudbury; built by Kingston, launched 31 May 1941 and completed 15 October 1941. Sold 1949 as a tug, name unaltered.
- Summerside; built by Morton, launched 7 May 1941 and completed 11 September 1941. Broken up June 1946.
- The Pas; built by Collingwood, launched 16 August 1941 and completed 21 October 1941. Broken up June 1946.
- Trail; built by Burrard, launched 16 October 1940 and completed 30 April 1941. Broken up August 1950.
- Trillium; ex-HMS Trillium, launched 26 June 1940 and completed 22 October 1940. Sold for mercantile service 17 May 1947, whale catcher Olympic Runner, later renamed Otori Maru No. 10 1956, and Kyo Mary No. 16 1959.
- Wetaskiwin; ex-Banff, built at Burrard, launched 18 July 1940 and completed 16 December 1940. Transferred to Venezuelan Navy as Victoria, 1946.
- Weyburn; built by Port Arthur, launched 26 July 1941 and completed 26 November 1941. Sunk by mine off Gibraltar 22 February 1941.
- Windflower; ex-Windflower, built by Davie Shipbuilding, launched 4 July 1940 and completed 26 October 1940. Sunk in collision with SS Zypenberg in the North Atlantic 7 December 1941.

16 further vessels were built under the 1940-1941 Programme:

- Brantford; built by Midland, launched 6 September 1941 and completed 15 May 1942. Sold for mercantile service 1945, whale catcher Olympic Arrow.
- Calgary; built by Marine Industries, launched 23 August 1941 and completed 16 December 1941. Sold for mercantile service 1946.
- Charlottetown; built by Kingston, launched 10 September 1941 and completed 13 December 1941. Sunk by German submarine U-517 in the Gulf of St Lawrence 11 September 1942.
- Dundas; built by Victoria Machinery, launched 25 July 1941 and completed 1 April 1942. Sold 23 October 1945.
- Fredericton; built by Marine Industries, launched 2 September 1941 and completed 8 December 1941. Sold for mercantile service 16 November 1945, renamed Tra Los Montes.
- Halifax; built by Collingwood, launched 4 October 1941 and completed 26 November 1941. Sold for use as salvage vessel 1946.
- Kitchener; ex-Vancouver, built by G.T Davie, launched 18 November 1941 and completed 28 June 1942. Sold 1946 and broken up April 1949.
- La Malbaie; ex-Fort William, built by Kingston, launched 25 October 1941 and completed 28 April 1942. Sold 1946.
- Midland; built by Midland, launched 25 June 1941 and completed 8 November 1941. Sold for mercantile service 1946.
- New Westminster; built by Victoria Machinery, launched 14 May 1941 and completed 31 January 1942. Sold for mercantile service 1947, renamed Elisa.
- Port Arthur; built by Port Arthur, launched 18 September 1941 and completed 26 May 1942. Broken up 1946.
- Regina; built by Marine Industries, launched 14 October 1941 and completed 22 January 1942. Sunk by mine in the English Channel 8 August 1944.
- Timmins; built by Yarrows, Esquimault, launched 26 June 1941 and completed 10 February 1942. Sold for mercantile service 1946, renamed Guayaquil.
- Vancouver; ex-Kitchener, built by Yarrows, Esquimault, launched 26 August 1941 and completed 20 March 1942. Sold 1946.
- Ville de Quebec; ex-Quebec, built by Morton, launched 12 November 1941 and completed 24 May 1942. Sold 1947.
- Woodstock; built by Collingwood, launched 10 December 1941 and completed 1 May 1942. Sold for mercantile service 1 March 1948, whale catcher Olympic Winner, then renamed Otori Maru No.20 1956 and Akitsu Maru 1957, broken up 1975.

Modified Flower Class 15 vessels were built in Canada under the 1942-1943 Programme, with another two vessels built in the UK and transferred to the RCN on completion:

- Atholl; built by Morton, launched 5 May 1943 and completed 14 October 1943. Broken up October 1952.
- Cobourg; built by Midland, launched 14 July 1943 and completed 11 May 1944. Sold for mercantile service 1945, renamed Camso, then renamed Dundas Kent 1948 and Puerto del Sol 1951.
- Fergus; built by Collingwood, launched 30 August 1944 and completed 18 November 1944. Sold for mercantile service 1945, renamed Camso II, then renamed Harcourt Kent 1948, lost 22 November 1949.
- Frontenac; built by Kingston, launched 2 June 1943 and completed 26 October 1943. Sold 2 October 1945.
- Guelph; built by Collingwood, launched 20 December 1943 and completed 9 May 1944. Sold for mercantile service 1946, with name unchanged, then renamed Josephine Lanasa 1955 and Burfin 1956.
- Hawkesbury; built by Morton, launched 16 November 1943 and completed 14 June 1944. Sold to Cambodia 1950, renamed Kampuchea, broken up 1956.
- Lindsay; built by Midland, launched 4 June 1943 and completed 15 November 1943. Sold for mercantile service 1946, renamed North Shaw.
- Louisburg; built by Morton, launched 13 July 1943 and completed 13 December 1943. Transferred to the Dominican Navy as Juan Alejandro Acosta, 1947.
- Norsyd; built by Morton, launched 31 July 1943 and completed 22 December 1943. Sold for mercantile service 1948, renamed Balboa, then to Israel as INS Haganah, 1950, scrapped 1956.
- North Bay; built by Collingwood, launched 27 April 1943 and completed 25 October 1943. Sold for mercantile service 1946, renamed Kent County II, then renamed Galloway Kent 1950 and Bedford II 1951.
- Owen Sound; built by Collingwood, launched 15 June 1943 and completed 17 November 1943. Sold for mercantile service 1946, renamed Cadio.
- Riviere du Loup; built by Morton, launched 2 July 1943 and completed 21 November 1943. Transferred to the Dominican Navy as Juan Bautista Maggiolo, 1947.
- St. Lambert; built by Morton, launched 6 November 1943 and completed 27 May 1944. Sold for mercantile service 1946, renamed Chrysi Hondroulis, then renamed Loula 1955.
- Trentonian; built by Kingston, launched 1 September 1943 and completed 1 December 1943. Sunk by German submarine U-1004 off Falmouth 22 February 1945.
- Whitby; built by Midland, launched 18 September 1943 and completed 6 June 1944. Sold to Portugal 1946.
- Forrest Hill; ex-HMS Ceanothos,
- Giffard; ex-HMS Buddleia.

12 vessels were built in Canada under the 1943-1944 Programme, with another two vessels built in the UK and transferred to the RCN on completion:

- Asbestos; built by Morton, launched 22 November 1943 and completed 16 June 1944. Broken up March 1949.
- Beauharnois; built by Morton, launched 11 May 1944 and completed 25 September 1944. Transferred to Israel as INS Wedgwood, 1950. Broken up 1956.
- Belleville; built by Kingston, launched 17 June 1944 and completed 19 October 1944. Transferred to the Dominican Navy as Juan Bautista Cambioso, 1947.
- Lachute; built by Morton, launched 9 June 1944 and completed 26 October 1944. Transferred to the Dominican Navy as Cristóbal Colón, 1947.
- Merrittonia; built by Morton, launched 24 June 1944 and completed 10 October 1944. Wrecked on Nova Scotian coast on 30 November 1945.
- Parry Sound; built by Midland, launched 13 November 1943 and completed 30 August 1944. Sold for mercantile service 1950, whale catcher Olympic Champion, then renamed Otori Maru No. 15 1956.
- Peterborough; built by Kingston, launched 15 January 1944 and completed 1 June 1944. Transferred to the Dominican Navy as Gerard Jansen, 1947.
- Smiths Falls; built by Kingston, launched 19 August 1944 and completed 28 November 1944. Sold for mercantile service 1950, whale catcher Olympic Lightning, then renamed Otori Maru No. 16 1956.
- Stellarton; built by Morton, launched 27 April 1944 and completed 29 September 1944. Transferred to Chilean Navy as Casma, 1946.
- Strathroy; built by Midland, launched 30 August 1944 and completed 20 November 1944. Transferred to Chilean Navy as Chipana, 1946.
- Thorlock; built by Midland, launched 15 May 1944 and completed 6 October 1944. Transferred to Chilean Navy as Papudo, 1946.
- West York; built by Midland, launched 25 January 1944 and completed 6 October 1944. Sold for mercantile use 1946, renamed Guatemala, then renamed Moulay Bouchaib 1946, Expresso 1953 and Federal Express 1960, lost 5 May 1960.
- Brampton; cancelled December 1943.
- Carleton; cancelled December 1943.
- Ingersoll; cancelled December 1943.
- Listowel; cancelled December 1943.
- Meaford; cancelled December 1943.
- Renfrew; cancelled December 1943.
- Simcoe; cancelled December 1943.
- Long Branch; ex-HMS Candytuft.
- Mimico; ex-HMS Bullrush.

== Royal Indian Navy ==
- Assam; ex-HMS Bugloss, in service Feb 1945 to 1947. Returned to RN and scrapped.
- Gondwana; ex-HMS Burnet, in service May 1945 to 1946. Transferred to Royal Thai Navy.
- Sind; ex-HMS Betony, in service Aug 1945 to 1946. Transferred to Royal Thai Navy.

== Royal Navy ==
Group 1: Pre-war orders of 56 vessels ordered on 25 July 1939 first 26, and 31 August 1939 next 30:

- Anemone; built by Blyth Dry Dock, laid down 26 October 1939, launched 22 April 1940 and completed 12 August 1940.
- Arbutus; built by Blyth Dry Dock, laid down 30 November 1939, launched 4 June 1940 and completed 12 October 1940.
- Asphodel; built by George Brown & Company, laid down 20 October 1939, launched 25 May 1940 and completed 11 September 1940.
- Aubrietia; built by George Brown & Company, laid down 27 October 1939, launched 5 September 1940 and completed 23 December 1940.
- Auricula; built by George Brown & Company, laid down 25 November 1939, launched 14 November 1940 and completed 5 March 1941.
- Azalea; built by Cook, Welton & Gemmell, laid down 15 November 1939, launched 8 July 1940 and completed 27 January 1941.
- Begonia; built by Cook, Welton & Gemmell, laid down 13 April 1940, launched 18 September 1940 and completed 3 March 1941. Transferred to the United States as USS Impulse.
- Bluebell; built by Fleming & Ferguson, laid down 25 October 1939, launched 24 April 1940 and completed 19 July 1940.
- Campanula; built by Fleming & Ferguson, laid down 26 October 1939, launched 23 May 1940 and completed 6 September 1940.
- Candytuft; built by Grangemouth Dockyard, laid down 31 October 1939, launched 8 July 1940 and completed 16 October 1940. Transferred to the United States as Tenacity.
- Carnation; built by Grangemouth Dockyard, laid down 26 February 1940, launched 3 September 1940 and completed 22 February 1941. Transferred to the Netherlands as Friso.
- Celandine; built by Grangemouth Dockyard, laid down 30 April 1940, launched 28 December 1940 and completed 30 April 1941.
- Clematis; built by Charles Hill & Sons, laid down 11 October 1939, launched 24 April 1940 and completed 27 July 1940.
- Columbine; built by Charles Hill & Sons, laid down 2 November 1939, launched 13 August 1940 and completed 9 November 1940.
- Convolvulus; built by Charles Hill & Sons, laid down 17 January 1940, launched 22 September 1940 and completed 26 February 1941.
- Coreopsis; built by A. & J. Inglis, laid down 13 October 1939, launched 23 May 1940 and completed 17 August 1940. Transferred to Greece as Kriezis.
- Crocus; built by A. & J. Inglis, laid down 26 October 1939, launched 26 June 1940 and completed 20 October 1940.
- Cyclamen; built by John Lewis, laid down 30 November 1939, launched 20 June 1940 and completed 30 September 1940.
- Dianella; ex-Daffodil, built by John Lewis, laid down 8 December 1939, launched 3 September 1940 and completed 6 January 1941.
- Dahlia; built by John Lewis, laid down 28 February 1940, launched 31 October 1940 and completed 21 March 1941.
- Delphinium; built by Henry Robb, laid down 31 October 1939, launched 6 June 1940 and completed 15 November 1940.
- Dianthus; built by Henry Robb, laid down 31 October 1939, launched 9 July 1940 and completed 17 March 1941.
- Gardenia; built by William Simons, laid down 20 September 1939, launched 10 April 1940 and completed 24 May 1940.
- Geranium; built by William Simons, laid down 21 September 1940, launched 23 April 1940 and completed 24 June 1940. Transferred to Denmark as Thetis.
- Gladiolus; built by Smith's Dock, laid down 19 October 1939, launched 24 January 1940 and completed 6 April 1940.
- Godetia I, F, built by Smith's Dock, laid down 4 January 1940, launched 8 May 1940 and completed 15 July 1940.
- Heliotrope; built by John Crown, laid down 23 October 1939, launched 5 June 1940 and completed 12 September 1940. Transferred to the United States as USS Surprise.
- Hollyhock; built by John Crown, laid down 27 November 1939, launched 19 August 1940 and completed 19 November 1940.
- Honeysuckle; built by Ferguson Brothers, laid down 26 October 1939, launched 22 April 1940 and completed 14 September 1940.
- Hydrangea; built by Ferguson Brothers, laid down 22 November 1939, launched 4 September 1940 and completed 3 January 1941.
- Jasmine; built by Ferguson Brothers, laid down 23 December 1939, launched 14 January 1941 and completed 16 May 1941.
- Jonquil; built by Fleming & Ferguson, laid down 27 December 1939, launched 9 July 1940 and completed 21 October 1940.
- Larkspur; built by Fleming & Ferguson, laid down 26 March 1940, launched 5 September 1940 and completed 4 January 1941. Transferred to the United States as USS Fury.
- Lavender; built by Alexander Hall, laid down 30 April 1940, launched 27 November 1940 and completed 16 May 1941.
- Lobelia; built by Alexander Hall, laid down 27 June 1940, launched 15 February 1941 and completed 16 July 1941. Transferred to Free French Naval Forces as Lobelia.
- Marguerite; built by Hall Russell, laid down 30 December 1939, launched 8 July 1940 and completed 20 November 1940.
- Marigold; built by Hall Russell, laid down 26 January 1940, launched 4 September 1940 and completed 28 February 1941.
- Mignonette; built by Hall Russell, laid down 15 July 1940, launched 28 November 1940 and completed 7 May 1941.
- Mimosa; built by Charles Hill & Sons, laid down 22 April 1940, launched 18 January 1941 and completed 11 May 1941. Transferred to Free French Naval Forces as Mimosa.
- Myosotis; built by John Lewis, laid down 24 June 1940, launched 28 January 1941 and completed 30 May 1941.
- Narcissus; built by John Lewis, laid down 9 September 1940, launched 29 March 1941 and completed 17 July 1941.
- Nigella; built by Philip and Son, laid down 28 November 1939, launched 21 September 1940 and completed 25 February 1941.
- Pentstemon; built by Philip and Son, laid down 28 November 1939, launched 18 January 1941 and completed 31 July 1941.
- Petunia; built by Henry Robb, laid down 4 December 1939, launched 19 September 1940 and completed 13 January 1941.
- Polyanthus; built by Henry Robb, laid down 19 March 1940, launched 30 November 1940 and completed 23 April 1941.
- Primrose; built by William Simons, laid down 22 September 1939, launched 8 May 1940 and completed 15 July 1940.
- Primula; built by William Simons, laid down 23 September 1939, launched 22 June 1940 and completed 27 August 1940.
- Salvia; built by William Simons, laid down 26 September 1939, launched 6 August 1940 and completed 20 September 1940.
- Snapdragon; built by William Simons, laid down 27 September 1939, launched 3 September 1940 and completed 28 October 1940.
- Snowdrop; built by Smith's Dock, laid down 10 April 1940, launched 19 July 1940 and completed 16 January 1941.
- Sunflower; built by Smith's Dock, laid down 24 May 1940, launched 19 August 1940 and completed 25 January 1941.
- Tulip; built by Smith's Dock, laid down 30 May 1940, launched 4 September 1940 and completed 18 November 1940.
- Verbena; built by Smith's Dock, laid down 29 June 1940, launched 1 October 1940 and completed 19 December 1940.
- Veronica; built by Smith's Dock, laid down 9 July 1940, launched 17 October 1940 and completed 18 February 1941. Transferred to the United States as USS Temptress.
- Wallflower; built by Smith's Dock, laid down 23 July 1940, launched 14 November 1940 and completed 7 March 1941.
- Zinnia; built by Smith's Dock, laid down 20 August 1940, launched 28 November 1940 and completed 30 March 1941.

Group 2: Wartime orders under the 1939 and 1940 War Programmes:

- Abelia; built by Harland & Wolff, Belfast, laid down 19 August 1940, launched 25 November 1940 and completed 3 February 1941.
- Acanthus; built by Ailsa Shipbuilding, Troon, laid down 3 September 1939, launched 26 May 1941 and completed 1 October 1941. Transferred to Norway as Andenes.
- Aconite; built by Ailsa Shipbuilding, Troon, laid down 25 March 1940, launched 31 March 1941 and completed 23 July 1941. Transferred to Free French Naval Forces as Aconit.
- Alisma; built by Harland & Wolff, laid down 19 August 1940, launched 17 December 1940 and completed 13 February 1941.
- Alyssum; built by George Brown, laid down 24 June 1940, launched 3 March 1941 and completed 17 June 1941. Transferred to Free French Naval Forces as Alysse.
- Amaranthus; built by Fleming & Ferguson, laid down 4 May 1940, launched 17 October 1940 and completed 12 February 1941.
- Anchusa; built by Harland & Wolff, laid down 17 September 1940, launched 15 January 1941 and completed 1 March 1941.
- Arabis; built by Harland & Wolff, laid down 30 October 1939, launched 14 February 1940 and completed 5 April 1940. Transferred to the United States as USS Saucy.
- Armeria; built by Harland & Wolff, laid down 17 September 1940, launched 16 January 1941 and completed 28 March 1941.
- Arrowhead; built by Marine Industries, Canada, launched 8 August 1940. Transferred to Canada as HMCS Arrowhead.
- Aster; built by Harland & Wolff, laid down 15 October 1940, launched 12 February 1941 and completed 11 April 1941.
- Balsam; built by George Brown, laid down 16 April 1941, launched 30 May 1942 and completed 28 November 1942.
- Bellwort; built by George Brown, laid down 17 September 1940, launched 11 August 1941 and completed 26 November 1941. Transferred to the Republic of Ireland as Cliona 1947.
- Bergamot; built by Harland & Wolff, laid down 15 October 1940, launched 15 February 1941 and completed 12 May 1941.
- Bittersweet; built by Marine Industries, Canada, launched 12 September 1940. Transferred to Canada as HMCS Bittersweet.
- Borage; built by George Brown, laid down 27 November 1940, launched 22 November 1941 and completed 29 April 1942. Transferred to the Republic of Ireland as Macha 1946.
- Bryony; built by Harland & Wolff, laid down 16 November 1940, launched 15 March 1941 and completed 16 June 1942. Transferred to Norway as weathership Polarfront II.
- Burdock; built by John Crown, laid down 13 June 1940, launched 14 December 1940 and completed 27 March 1941.
- Buttercup; built by Harland & Wolff, laid down 17 December 1940, launched 10 April 1941 and completed 24 April 1942. Transferred to Norway as Buttercup.
- Calendula; built by Harland & Wolff, laid down 30 October 1939, launched 21 March 1940 and completed 6 May 1940. Transferred to the United States as USS Ready.
- Camellia; built by Harland & Wolff, laid down 14 November 1939, launched 4 May 1940 and completed 18 June 1940.
- Campion; built by John Crown, laid down 16 September 1940, launched 26 April 1941 and completed 7 July 1941.
- Chrysanthemum; built by Harland & Wolff, laid down 17 December 1940, launched 11 April 1941 and completed 26 January 1942. Transferred to Free French Naval Forces as Commandant Drogou.
- Clarkia; built by Harland & Wolff, laid down 30 October 1939, launched 7 March 1940 and completed 22 April 1940.
- Clover; built by Fleming & Ferguson, laid down 29 July 1940, launched 30 January 1941 and completed 31 May 1941.
- Coltsfoot; built by Alexander Hall, laid down 4 September 1940, launched 12 May 1941 and completed 1 October 1941.
- Coriander; built by Hall Russell, laid down 19 September 1940, launched 9 June 1941 and completed 16 September 1941. Transferred to Free French Naval Forces as Commandant Detroyant.
- Cowslip; built by Harland & Wolff, laid down 16 January 1941, launched 28 May 1941 and completed 9 August 1941.
- Eglantine; built by Harland & Wolff, laid down 16 January 1941, launched 11 June 1941 and completed 29 August 1941. Transferred to Norway as Eglantine.
- Erica; built by Harland & Wolff, laid down 24 February 1940, launched 18 June 1940 and completed 7 August 1940.
- Eyebright; built by Canadian Vickers, launched 22 July 1940. Transferred to Canada as HMCS Eyebright.
- Fennel; built by Marine Industries, Canada, launched 20 August 1940. Transferred to Canada as HMCS Fennel.
- Fleur de Lys; ex-French La Dieppoise, lost 14 October 1941.
- Freesia; built by Harland & Wolff, laid down 18 June 1940, launched 3 October 1940 and completed 19 November 1940.
- Fritillary; built by Harland & Wolff, laid down 15 February 1941, launched 2 July 1941 and completed 1 November 1941.
- Genista; built by Harland & Wolff, laid down 15 February 1941, launched 24 July 1941 and completed 19 December 1941.
- Gentian; built by Harland & Wolff, laid down 20 April 1940, launched 6 August 1940 and completed 20 September 1940.
- Gloxinia; built by Harland & Wolff, laid down 21 March 1940, launched 2 July 1940 and completed 22 August 1940.
- Godetia II, built by John Crown, laid down 15 January 1941, launched 24 September 1941 and completed 23 February 1942. Scrapped 1947.
- Heartsease; built by Harland & Wolff, laid down 14 November 1939, launched 20 April 1940 and completed 4 June 1940. Transferred to the United States as USS Courage.
- Heather; built by Harland & Wolff, laid down 22 May 1940, launched 17 September 1940 and completed 1 November 1940.
- Hepatica; built by Davie Shipbuilding, Canada, launched 6 July 1940. Transferred to Canada as HMCS Hepatica.
- Hibiscus; built by Harland & Wolff, laid down 14 November 1939, launched 6 April 1940 and completed 21 May 1940. Transferred to the United States as USS Spry.
- Hyacinth; built by Harland & Wolff, laid down 20 April 1940, launched 28 September 1940 and completed 4 October 1940. Transferred to Greece as Apostolis.
- Hyderabad; ex-Nettle, built by Alexander Hall, laid down 24 December 1940, launched 23 September 1941 and completed 23 February 1942. Scrapped October 1948.
- Kingcup; built by Harland & Wolff, laid down 19 July 1940, launched 31 October 1940 and completed 3 January 1941.
- La Malouine; ex-French vessel of same name, seized by the Royal Navy 3 July 1940.
- Loosestrife; built by Hall Russell, laid down 9 December 1940, launched 25 August 1941 and completed 25 November 1941.
- Lotus; built by Charles Hill & Sons, laid down 26 May 1941, launched 17 January 1942 and completed 23 May 1942. Transferred to Free French Naval Forces as Commandant d'Estienne d'Orves.
- Lotus; ex-Phlox, built by Henry Robb, laid down 26 March 1941, launched 16 January 1942 and completed 9 May 1942.
- Mallow; built by Harland & Wolff, laid down 14 November 1939, launched 22 May 1940 and completed 2 July 1940. Transferred to Yugoslavia as Nada.
- Mayflower; built by Canadian Vickers, launched 3 July 1940. Transferred to Canada as HMCS Mayflower.
- Meadowsweet; built by Charles Hill & Sons, laid down 12 August 1941, launched 28 March 1942 and completed 8 July 1942.
- Monkshood; built by Fleming & Ferguson, laid down 1 October 1940, launched 17 April 1941 and completed 31 July 1941.
- Montbretia; built by Fleming & Ferguson, laid down 16 November 1940, launched 27 May 1941 and completed 29 September 1941. Transferred to Norway as Montbretia.
- Nasturtium; ex-French La Paimpolaise.
- Orchis; built by Harland & Wolff, laid down 18 June 1940, launched 15 October 1940 and completed 30 November 1940.
- Oxlip; built by A. & J. Inglis, laid down 9 December 1940, launched 28 August 1941 and completed 28 December 1941. Transferred to the Republic of Ireland as Maev 1946.
- Pennywort; built by A. & J. Inglis, laid down 11 March 1941, launched 18 October 1941 and completed 5 March 1942.
- Peony; built by Harland & Wolff, laid down 24 February 1940, launched 4 June 1940 and completed 6 August 1940. Transferred to Greece as Sakhtouris.
- Periwinkle; built by Harland & Wolff, laid down 30 October 1939, launched 24 February 1940 and completed 8 April 1940. Transferred to the United States as USS Restless.
- Picotee; built by Harland & Wolff, laid down 21 March 1940, launched 19 July 1940 and completed 5 September 1940.
- Pimpernel; built by Harland & Wolff, laid down 19 July 1940, launched 16 November 1940 and completed 9 January 1941.
- Pink; built by Henry Robb, laid down 20 May 1941, launched 16 February 1942 and completed 2 July 1942.
- Poppy; built by Alexander Hall, laid down 6 March 1941, launched 20 November 1941 and completed 12 May 1942.
- Potentilla; built by William Simons, laid down 28 February 1941, launched 18 December 1941 and completed 5 February 1942. Transferred to Norway as Potentilla.
- Renonculus; built by William Simons, laid down 19 July 1940, launched 25 June 1941 and completed 28 July 1941. Transferred to Free French Naval Forces as Renoncule.
- Rhododendron; built by Harland & Wolff, laid down 22 May 1940, launched 2 September 1940 and completed 18 October 1940.
- Rockrose; built by Charles Hill & Sons, laid down 28 October 1940, launched 26 July 1941 and completed 4 November 1941. Transferred to South Africa as HMSAS Protea.
- Rose; built by William Simons, laid down 3 September 1940, launched 22 September 1941 and completed 31 October 1941. Transferred to Norway as Rose.
- Samphire; built by Smith's Dock, laid down 4 December 1940, launched 14 April 1941 and completed 30 June 1941.
- Saxifrage; built by Charles Hill & Sons, laid down 1 February 1941, launched 24 October 1941 and completed 6 February 1942.
- Snowberry; built by Davie Shipbuilding, Canada, launched 8 August 1940. Transferred to Canada as HMCS Snowberry.
- Snowflake; built by Smith's Dock, laid down 19 May 1941, launched 22 August 1941 and completed 2 November 1941.
- Spikenard; built by Davie Shipbuilding, Canada, launched 10 August 1940. Transferred to Canada as HMCS Spikenard.
- Spiraea; built by A. & J. Inglis, laid down 31 May 1940, launched 31 October 1940 and completed 27 February 1941.
- Starwort; built by A. & J. Inglis, laid down 11 June 1940, launched 12 February 1941 and completed 26 May 1941.
- Stonecrop; built by Smith's Dock, laid down 4 February 1941, launched 12 May 1941 and completed 30 July 1941.
- Sundew; built by John Lewis, laid down 4 November 1940, launched 28 May 1941 and completed 19 September 1941. Transferred to Free French Naval Forces as Roselys.
- Sweetbriar; built by Smith's Dock, laid down 4 April 1941, launched 26 June 1941 and completed 8 September 1941.
- Tamarisk; built by Fleming & Ferguson, laid down 10 February 1941, launched 28 July 1941 and completed 26 December 1941. Transferred to Greece as Tompazis.
- Thyme; built by Smith's Dock, laid down 30 April 1941, launched 25 July 1941 and completed 23 October 1941.
- Trillium; built by Canadian Vickers, launched 26 June 1940. Transferred to Canada as HMCS Trillium.
- Vervain; built by Harland & Wolff, laid down 16 November 1940, launched 12 March 1941 and completed 9 June 1941.
- Vetch; built by Smith's Dock, laid down 15 March 1941, launched 27 May 1941 and completed 11 August 1941.
- Violet; built by William Simons, laid down 21 March 1940, launched 30 December 1940 and completed 3 February 1941.
- Windflower; built by Davie Shipbuilding, Canada, launched 4 July 1940. Transferred to Canada as HMCS Windflower.
- Woodruff; built by William Simons, laid down 29 April 1940, launched 28 February 1941 and completed 7 April 1941.

Group 3: Wartime orders under the 1941 first 21 ships, and 1942 last 4 ships, War Programmes these were the vessels of the Modified Flower class:

- Comfrey; built by Collingwood, Canada, ordered 6 October 1841, launched 28 July 1942. Transferred to the United States as USS Action.
- Cornel; built by Collingwood, Canada, ordered 6 October 1841, launched 4 September 1942. Transferred to the United States as USS Alacrity.
- Dittany; ex-USS Beacon, built by Collingwood, Canada, ordered 6 October 1841, launched 31 October 1942.
- Linaria; ex-USS Clash, built by Midland, Canada, ordered 6 October 1841, launched 18 November 1942.
- Flax; built by Kingston, Canada, ordered 6 October 1841, launched 15 June 1942. Transferred to the United States as USS Brisk.
- Honesty; ex-USS Caprice, built by Kingston, Canada, ordered 6 October 1841, launched 28 September 1942. Returned to the United States 5 January 1946.
- Mandrake; built by Morton, Canada, ordered 6 October 1841, launched 22 August 1942. Transferred to the United States as USS Haste.
- Milfoil; built by Morton, Canada, ordered 6 October 1841, launched 5 August 1942. Transferred to the United States as USS Intensity.
- Musk; built by Morton, Canada, ordered 6 October 1841, launched 15 July 1942. Transferred to the United States as USS Might.
- Nepeta; built by Morton, Canada, ordered 6 October 1841, launched 29 November 1942. Transferred to the United States as USS Pert.
- Privet; built by Morton, Canada, ordered 6 October 1841, launched 4 December 1942. Transferred to the United States as USS Prudent.
- Rosebay; ex-USS Splendor, built by Kingston, Canada, ordered 6 December 1841, launched 11 February 1943.
- Smilax; ex-USS Tact, built by Collingwood, Canada, ordered 6 December 1841, launched 24 December 1942.
- Statice; ex-USS Vim, built by Collingwood, Canada, ordered 6 December 1841, launched 10 April 1943.
- Willowherb; ex-USS Vitality, built by Midland, Canada, ordered 6 December 1941, launched 24 March 1943. Returned to the United States 11 June 1946.
- Betony; built by Alexander Hall, laid down 26 September 1942, launched 22 April 1943 and completed 31 August 1943. Transferred to India as Sind.
- Buddleia; built by Alexander Hall, laid down 30 November 1942, launched 19 June 1943 and completed 7 November 1943. Transferred to Canada as HMCS Giffard.
- Burnet; built by Fergusson Brothers, laid down 2 November 1942, launched 31 May 1943 and completed 23 September 1943. Transferred to India as Gondwana.
- Ceanothus; built by Fergusson Brothers, laid down 5 February 1943, launched 30 August 1943 and completed 10 December 1943. Transferred to Canada as HMCS Forrest Hill.
- Bugloss; built by John Crown, laid down 26 November 1942, launched 21 June 1943 and completed 8 November 1943. Transferred to India as Assam.
- Bullrush; built by John Crown, laid down 22 February 1943, launched 11 October 1943 and completed 15 February 1944. Transferred to Canada as HMCS Mimico.
- Candytuft; built by A. & J. Inglis, laid down 27 February 1943, launched 28 September 1943 and completed 15 January 1944. Transferred to Canada as HMCS Long Branch.
- Charlock; built by Fergusson Brothers, laid down 6 April 1943, launched 16 November 1943 and completed 10 March 1944.
- Arabis; built by George Brown, laid down 26 February 1943, launched 28 October 1943 and completed 16 March 1944. Transferred to New Zealand as HMNZS Arabis.
- Arbutus; built by George Brown, laid down 1 May 1943, launched 26 January 1944 and completed 5 July 1944. Transferred to New Zealand as HMNZS Arbutus.

== Royal New Zealand Navy ==
- Arabis; ex-HMS Arabis, in service March 1944 to 1948. Returned to RN.
- Arbutus; ex-HMS Arbutus, in service July 1944 to 1948. Returned to RN.

== South African Navy ==
- Protea; ex-HMS Rockrose. Commissioned to RN, Nov 1941. Transferred to SAN Oct 1947. In service until scrapped, 1967

== Royal Thai Navy ==
- Bangpakong; ex-HMS Burnet, HMIS Gondwana, delivered 1947, scrapped in the 1950s.
- Prasae; ex-HMS Betony, HMIS Sind, delivered 1947, lost on the North Korean coast in February 1951 during the Korean War.

== United States Navy ==
Ten vessels out of RN service transferred to the USN, 15 orders for Flower corvettes at Canadian yards transferred to USN 8 delivered to USN, seven to RN, June 1946 handed over to USN.

- Action; ex-HMS Comfrey, commissioned 22 November 1942, paid off 6 September 1945, sold February 1946.
- Alacrity; ex-HMS Cornel, commissioned 10 December 1942, paid off 4 October 1945, sold.
- Beacon; to the United Kingdom as HMS Dittany.
- Brisk; ex-HMS Flax, commissioned 6 December 1942, paid off 9 October 1945.
- Caprice; to the United Kingdom as HMS Honesty.
- Clash; to the United Kingdom as HMS Linaria.
- Courage; commissioned 4 June 1940 as HMS Heartsease, transferred to USN 3 April 1942, 22 August 1945 returned to RN.
- Fury; commissioned 4 January 1941 as HMS Larkspur, transferred to USN 17 March 1942, 22 August 1945 returned to RN.
- Haste; ex-HMS Mandrake, commissioned 6 April 1942, paid off 3 October 1945, sold.
- Impulse; commissioned 3 March 1941 as HMS Begonia, transferred to USN 10 March 1942, 22 August 1945 returned to RN.
- Intensity; ex-HMS Milfoil, commissioned 31 March 1943, paid off 3 October 1945, sold.
- Might; ex-HMS Musk, commissioned 22 December 1942, paid off 9 October 1945, sold.
- Pert; ex-HMS Nepeta, commissioned 23 July 1943, paid off 3 October 1945, sold October 1946.
- Prudent; ex-HMS Privet, commissioned 1 August 1943, paid off 11 October 1945, sold 1949.
- Ready; commissioned 6 May 1940 as HMS Calendula, transferred to USN 12 March 1942, 23 August 1945 returned to RN.
- Restless; commissioned 8 April 1940 as HMS Periwinkle, transferred to USN 15 March 1942, 20 August 1945 returned to RN.
- Saucy; commissioned 5 April 1940 as HMS Arabis, transferred to USN 30 April 1942, 20 August 1945 returned to RN, renamed HMS Snapdragon.
- Splendor; to the United Kingdom as HMS Rosebay.
- Spry; commissioned 21 May 1940 as HMS Hibiscus, transferred to USN 2 May 1942, 20 August 1945 returned to RN.
- Surprise; commissioned 12 September 1940 as HMS Heliotrope, transferred to USN 24 March 1942, 20 August 1945 returned to RN.
- Tact; to the United Kingdom as HMS Smilax.
- Temptress; commissioned 12 February 1941 as HMS Veronica, transferred to USN 21 March 1942, 20 August 1945 returned to RN.
- Tenacity; commissioned 16 October 1940 as HMS Candytuft, transferred to USN 11 June 1942, 22 August 1945 returned to RN.
- Vim; to the United Kingdom as HMS Statice.
- Vitality; to the United Kingdom as HMS Willowherb.

== Venezuelan Navy ==
- Constitucion; ex-HMCS Algoma, delivered 1945, scrapped 1962.
- Carabobo; ex-HMCS Kamsack, lost December 1945 on delivery.
- Federacion; ex-HMCS Amherst, delivered 1945, scrapped 1956.
- Independencia; ex-HMCS Dunvegan, delivered 1946, scrapped 1953.
- Libertad; ex-HMCS Battleford, delivered 1946, lost 12 April 1949.
- Patria; ex-HMCS Oakville, delivered 1945, scrapped 1962.
- Victoria; ex-HMCS Wetaskiwin, delivered 1946, scrapped 1962.

== Yugoslav Navy ==
- Nada; ex-HMS Mallow, commissioned RN 2 July 1940, transferred to Yugoslav forces 11 January 1944, served until 1948, in her last year renamed Partizanka, then returned to the Royal Navy, resold to Egypt.
