= Strathroy =

Strathroy may refer to:

- Strathroy, a suburb of Omagh in Tyrone County, Northern Ireland
- Strathroy-Caradoc, Ontario, Canada
  - Strathroy (Blue Yonder) Airport
  - Strathroy station
- HMCS Strathroy, a World War II corvette of the Royal Canadian Navy
