= Nepeta (disambiguation) =

Nepeta is a genus of plant.

Nepeta may also refer to:

- HMS Nepeta, former name of the USS Pert
- Nepeta Leijon, a fictional character from the webcomic Homestuck (2009-2016)
