= ARA República =

At least two ships of the Argentine Navy have been named República:

- ARA República (1874), a gunboat commissioned in 1875.
- ARA República (P-10), an Action-class patrol boat launched in 1942 as USS Tact which served in the Royal Navy as HMS Smilax between 1943 and 1946. Acquired by Argentina in 1946 and renamed. She was decommissioned in the 1960s.
