= USS Pert =

Gunboat of the United States Navy

History

United Kingdom
- Name: Nepeta
- Builder: Morton Engineering & Dry Dock Co., Quebec City
- Laid down: 22 July 1942 as CN314
- Launched: 27 November 1942
- Identification: Pennant number: K290
- Fate: Transferred to the US Navy

United States
- Name: Pert
- Commissioned: 23 July 1943
- Decommissioned: 3 October 1945
- Stricken: 24 October 1945
- Fate: Sold into mercantile service 18 October 1946

General characteristics
- Class & type: Action-class patrol boat
- Displacement: 1,375 long tons (1,397 t)
- Length: 205 ft (62 m)
- Beam: 33 ft (10 m)
- Draft: 14 ft 7 in (4.45 m)
- Propulsion: Two 3-drum express boilers, 2,750ihp vertical triple expansion Canadian Vickers engine, one shaft.
- Speed: 16.5 kn (19.0 mph; 30.6 km/h)
- Complement: 90
- Armament: 2 × 3"/50 dual purpose gun mounts; 4 × 20 mm gun mounts; 3 × .30 cal (7.62 mm) Browning machine guns; 1 × Hedgehog; 4 × depth charge guns; 2 × depth charge chutes

USS Pert (PG-95), the second United States Navy ship of that name, was one of eight Canadian-built corvettes turned over to the U.S. Navy for operation by the United States Coast Guard. She was laid down by Morton Engineering and Dry Dock Co., Ltd., Quebec, Canada, 22 July 1942; launched 27 November 1942; and commissioned at Quebec 23 July 1943.

Pert remained at Quebec until 7 September; thence, she sailed with USS Prudent via Halifax to Boston where she arrived 18 September. After fitting out, she carried out an intensive shakedown off Bermuda early in November. Returning to New York 20 November, she was assigned to the Eastern Sea Frontier, and began convoy escort patrols 28 November.

Between 28 November and 4 December, Pert screened Convoy NG-401 from New York City to Guantanamo Bay, Cuba. On 2 December she carried out a depth charge attack against a suspected submarine without results. The gunboat made the return run to New York 9–17 December, and on 23 December she joined the screen of her next Cuban-bound convoy, NG-406.

During the remainder of the war Pert continued her important escort and patrol operations along the East Coast and into the Caribbean. Based at Tompkinsville, N.Y., she served with sister gunboats including USS Action and Impulse. Their outstanding performance helped lessen the threat of U-boats against Allied shipping. Moreover, they permitted the larger destroyer types to wage aggressive hunter-killer patrols against the German submarines.

Following the defeat of the Axis powers, Pert operated out of the 3d Naval District until 3 October 1945 when she decommissioned. Her name was struck from the Naval Vessel Register on 24 October 1945. Transferred to the Maritime Commission on 18 October 1946, she was immediately delivered to her buyer, United Boat Service Co. of City Island, N.Y.

Ex-Pert was renamed Olympic Leader in 1950. Sold to a Japanese company, she was renamed Otori Maru No. 1 in 1956, and Kyo Maru No. 15 in 1957.
