= HMCS St. Lambert =

Modified Flower-class corvette

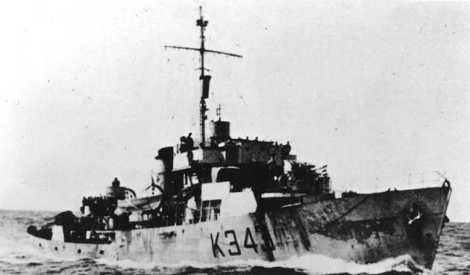
- HMCS St. Lambert

History

Canada
- Name: HMCS St. Lambert
- Namesake: Saint-Lambert, Quebec
- Ordered: April 1942
- Builder: Morton Engineering & Dry Dock Co., Quebec City
- Laid down: 8 July 1943
- Launched: 6 November 1943
- Commissioned: 27 May 1944
- Decommissioned: 20 July 1945
- Identification: Pennant number: K343
- Honours and awards: Atlantic 1944–45
- Fate: Sold for mercantile use 1946. Wrecked 14 March 1964

General characteristics
- Class & type: Flower-class corvette (modified)
- Displacement: 1,015 long tons (1,031 t; 1,137 short tons)
- Length: 208 ft (63.40 m)o/a
- Beam: 33 ft (10.06 m)
- Draught: 11 ft (3.35 m)
- Propulsion: single shaft; 2 × oil fired water tube boilers; 1 triple-expansion reciprocating steam engine; 2,750 ihp (2,050 kW)
- Speed: 16 knots (29.6 km/h)
- Range: 7,400 nautical miles (13,705 km) at 10 knots (18.5 km/h)
- Complement: 90
- Sensors & processing systems: 1 Type 271 SW2C radar; 1 Type 144 sonar
- Armament: 1 × 4 in (102 mm) QF Mk XIX naval gun; 1 × 2-pounder Mk.VIII single "pom-pom"; 2 × 20 mm Oerlikon single; 1 × Hedgehog A/S mortar; 4 × Mk.II depth charge throwers; 2 × depth charge rails with 70 depth charges

HMCS St. Lambert was a modified Flower-class corvette that served with the Royal Canadian Navy during the Second World War. She fought primarily in the Battle of the Atlantic as a convoy escort. She was named for Saint-Lambert, Quebec.

== Background ==
Flower-class corvettes like St. Lambert serving with the Royal Canadian Navy during the Second World War were different from earlier and more traditional sail-driven corvettes. The "corvette" designation was created by the French as a class of small warships; the Royal Navy borrowed the term for a period but discontinued its use in 1877. During the hurried preparations for war in the late 1930s, Winston Churchill reactivated the corvette class, needing a name for smaller ships used in an escort capacity, in this case based on a whaling ship design. The generic name "flower" was used to designate the class of these ships, which – in the Royal Navy – were named after flowering plants.

Corvettes commissioned by the Royal Canadian Navy during the Second World War were named after communities for the most part, to better represent the people who took part in building them. This idea was put forth by Admiral Percy W. Nelles. Sponsors were commonly associated with the community for which the ship was named. Royal Navy corvettes were designed as open sea escorts, while Canadian corvettes were developed for coastal auxiliary roles which was exemplified by their minesweeping gear. Eventually the Canadian corvettes would be modified to allow them to perform better on the open seas.

== Construction ==
St. Lambert was ordered April 1942 as part of the 1942–43 modified Flower-class building programme. This programme was known as the Increased Endurance. Many changes were made, all from lessons that had been learned in previous versions of the Flower-class. The bridge was made a full deck higher and built to naval standards instead of the more civilian-like bridges of previous versions. The platform for the 4-inch main gun was raised to minimize the amount of spray over it and to provide a better field of fire. It was also connected to the wheelhouse by a wide platform that was now the base for the Hedgehog anti-submarine mortar that this version was armed with. Along with the new Hedgehog, this version got the new QF 4-inch Mk XIX main gun, which was semi-automatic, used fixed ammunition and had the ability to elevate higher giving it an anti-aircraft ability.

Other superficial changes to this version include an upright funnel and pressurized boiler rooms which eliminated the need for hooded ventilators around the base of the funnel. This changes the silhouette of the corvette and made it more difficult for submariners to tell which way the corvette was laying.

St. Lambert was laid down by Morton Engineering & Dry Dock Co. at Quebec City, Quebec 8 July 1943 and was launched 6 November 1943. She was commissioned into the Royal Canadian Navy 27 May 1944 at Quebec City. St. Lambert had no major refits during her war service due to her late arrival into the conflict.

== Service history ==
After working up St. Lambert joined the Mid-Ocean Escort Force (MOEF) as a trans-Atlantic convoy escort. She was assigned to escort group C-8 in mid-August 1944. She served with MOEF for the rest of the war. During that time she escorted the last HX convoy of the war, HX 358. In June 1945 she returned to Canada.

St. Lambert was paid off at Sorel, Quebec 20 July 1945 and laid up. She was transferred to the War Assets Corporation and sold for mercantile conversion in 1946. She emerged as the 1,075 GRT cargo ship Chrysi Hondroulis registered under a Panamainian flag. In 1955 she was sold and renamed Loula, operating under a Greek flag. In 1958, the ship was renamed Stefanos III. She was last noted on Lloyd’s Register in 1957–58. (Note: According to the Miramar Ship Index, the ship wrecked on 14 March 1964 on Pakhia Island, 60 nautical miles (110 km; 69 mi) northwest of Rhodes while travelling from Thessaloniki to Messina.)
