= HMCS Mimico =

Modified Flower-class corvette

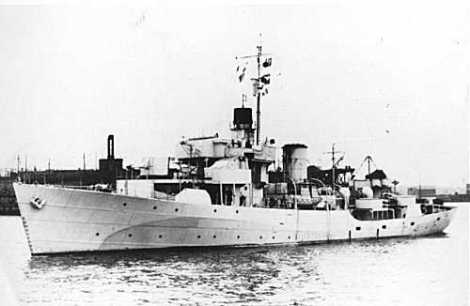
- HMCS Mimico

History

Canada
- Name: HMCS Mimico
- Namesake: Mimico, Ontario
- Ordered: 15 May 1942
- Builder: John Crown & Sons Ltd. Sunderland
- Laid down: 22 February 1943
- Launched: 11 October 1943
- Commissioned: 8 February 1944
- Decommissioned: 18 July 1945
- Identification: Pennant number: K485
- Honours and awards: Atlantic 1945, English Channel 1945
- Fate: Sold for commercial use

General characteristics
- Class & type: Flower-class corvette (modified)
- Displacement: 1,015 long tons (1,031 t; 1,137 short tons)
- Length: 208 ft (63.40 m)o/a
- Beam: 33 ft (10.06 m)
- Draught: 11 ft (3.35 m)
- Propulsion: single shaft, 2 × oil fired water tube boilers, 1 triple-expansion reciprocating steam engine, 2,750 ihp (2,050 kW)
- Speed: 16 knots (29.6 km/h)
- Range: 3,500 nautical miles (6,482 km) at 12 knots (22.2 km/h)
- Complement: 90
- Sensors & processing systems: 1 × Type 271 SW2C radar; 1 × Type 144 sonar
- Armament: 1 × 4 in (102 mm) BL Mk.IX single gun; 1 × 2-pounder Mk.VIII single "pom-pom"; 2 × 20 mm Oerlikon single; 1 × Hedgehog A/S mortar; 4 × Mk.II depth charge throwers; 2 Depth charge rails with 70 depth charges

HMCS Mimico was a modified Flower-class corvette that served with the Royal Canadian Navy during the Second World War. She served primarily as a convoy escort in the Battle of the Atlantic. She was originally laid down by the Royal Navy as HMS Bullrush but was never commissioned into the RN, being transferred to the RCN before completion. She is named for Mimico, Ontario, a town that was eventually amalgamated into the larger city Toronto, Ontario.

== Background ==
Flower-class corvettes like Mimico serving with the Royal Canadian Navy during the Second World War were different from earlier and more traditional sail-driven corvettes. The "corvette" designation was created by the French as a class of small warships; the Royal Navy borrowed the term for a period but discontinued its use in 1877. During the hurried preparations for war in the late 1930s, Winston Churchill reactivated the corvette class, needing a name for smaller ships used in an escort capacity, in this case based on a whaling ship design. The generic name "flower" was used to designate the class of these ships, which – in the Royal Navy – were named after flowering plants.

Corvettes commissioned by the Royal Canadian Navy during the Second World War were named after communities for the most part, to better represent the people who took part in building them. This idea was put forth by Admiral Percy W. Nelles. Sponsors were commonly associated with the community for which the ship was named. Royal Navy corvettes were designed as open sea escorts, while Canadian corvettes were developed for coastal auxiliary roles which was exemplified by their minesweeping gear. Eventually the Canadian corvettes would be modified to allow them to perform better on the open seas.

== Construction and career ==
Bullrush was ordered 15 May 1942 as part of the Royal Navy 1942–43 Increased Endurance Flower-class building program. She was laid down 22 February 1943 by John Crown & Sons Ltd. at Sunderland and launched 11 October 1943 . As part of an exchange for Algerine-class minesweepers that the RCN intended to use as convoy escorts, the Royal Navy transferred four Flower-class corvettes and twelve Castle-class corvettes to Canada in order to acquire them. Bullrush was transferred on 8 February 1944 and commissioned as HMCS Mimico into the RCN at Aberdeen. The only significant differences between the RCN and RN 1942–43 Flower classes was a shortened mainmast and varying anti-aircraft armament.

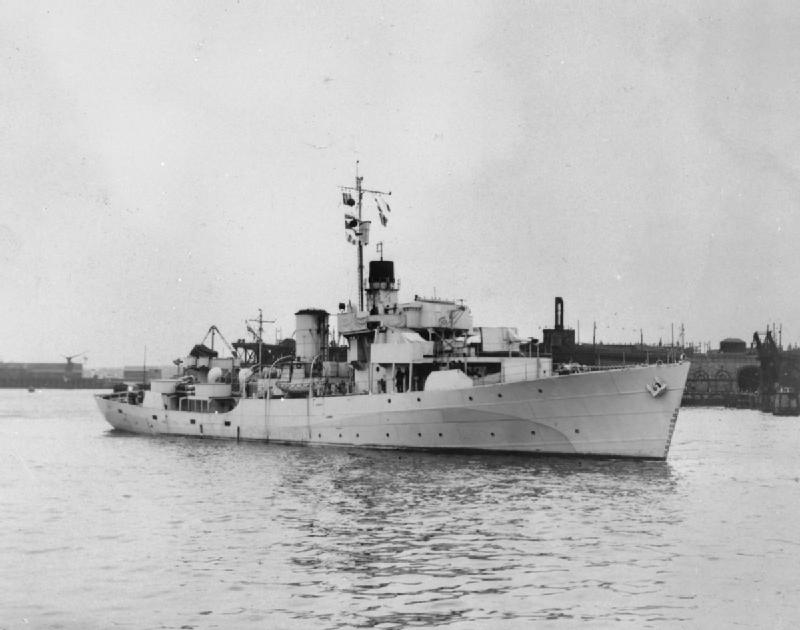
HMCS Mimico in harbour

After working up at Stornoway, Mimico was assigned to Western Approaches Command out of Oban. She participated in Operation Neptune, the naval aspect of the invasion of Normandy. She arrived off the beaches one day after the invasion with the convoy she was escorting. She remained as a convoy escort in the English Channel after the invasion, transferring to Portsmouth Command in September 1944 and Nore Command in October.

Mimico departed for a two-month refit in February 1945 at Chatham. After working up she returned to service with Nore Command and continued as such until May 1945, when she departed for Canada.

Mimico was paid off at Sorel, Quebec 18 July 1945. She was transferred to the War Assets Corporation and sold for conversion to a whale-catcher. She reappeared in 1950 as the 702 GRT Olympic Victor. In 1956 she was sold and renamed Otori Maru No.12. She was renamed one more time, Kyo Maru No.25 in 1962 and last appeared on Lloyd's Register in 1977. The ship was broken up in Japan in 1976.
