= HNLMS Friso (K00) =

Royal Netherlands Navy Covette

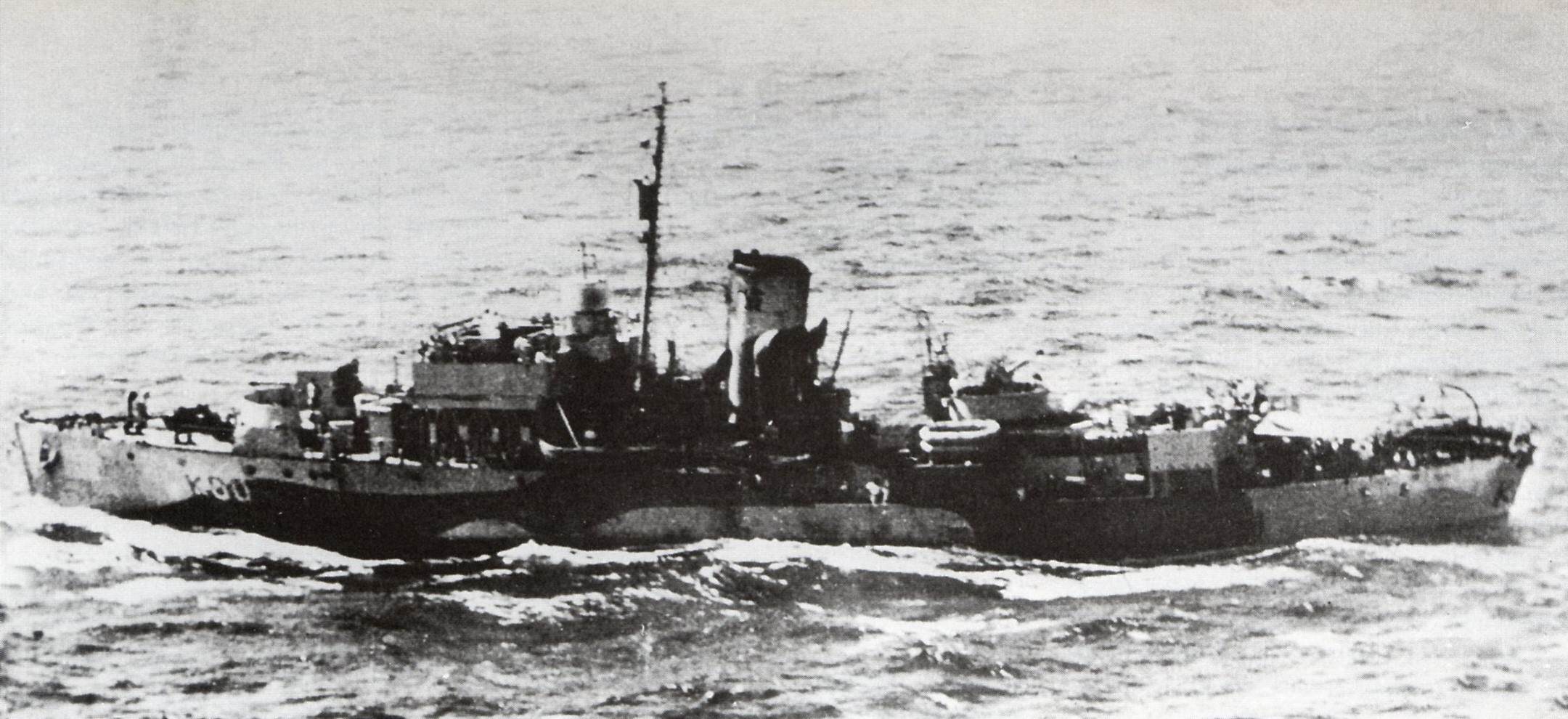
- HNLMS Friso, ex-HMS Carnation of the Flower class

History

Netherlands
- Name: Friso
- Namesake: Friso
- Commissioned: 16 October 1940
- In service: 26 March 1943
- Out of service: 4 October 1944

General characteristics
- Class & type: Flower-class corvette
- Displacement: 925 tons
- Length: 62.5 m (205 ft 1 in)
- Beam: 10.1 m (33 ft 2 in)
- Draught: 4.4 m (14 ft 5 in)
- Propulsion: 2,800 hp (2,100 kW)
- Speed: 16 knots (30 km/h; 18 mph)
- Complement: 95
- Armament: 1 × 10.2 cm guns; 4 × single 40 mm guns; 2 × single 20 mm guns; Depth charges

HNLMS Friso (K00) was a Flower-class corvette of the Royal Netherlands Navy (RNLN). She was built in the United Kingdom originally for the Royal Navy (RN) as HMS Carnation. On 26 March 1943 the corvette was loaned to the RNLN in exchange for HNLMS Jan van Gelder. During her service in the RNLN she protected convoys and was placed under operational command of the RN. On 5 October 1944 Friso was returned to the RN.

Named after the Brinio-class gunboat Friso which was sunk in the defense of the Netherlands at the start of the Second World War, Friso was crewed by the surviving crew of the sunken minesweeper Jan van Gelder.

== Construction and design ==
Friso was built at Grangemouth Dockyard in the United Kingdom and engined by North-Eastern Marine. She was launched on 3 September 1940 and served originally in the Royal Navy (RN) as HMS Carnation. In January 1943, however, it was decided that the corvette would be loaned to the Royal Netherlands Navy (RNLN) in exchange for the HNLMS Jan van Gelder. On 26 March 1943 she was transferred to the RNLN and commissioned as Friso.

Like other corvettes of the Flower class Friso was based on a whaler design.

== Service history ==
During the Second World War Friso protected convoys during their journeys across the Atlantic Ocean and Mediterranean Sea. Her homeport was Liverpool.

On 5 October 1944 Friso was returned to the RN. As she was no longer deemed useful by the RNLN for the tasks at hand.

== Citations ==
=== Bibliography ===
- Mark, Chris (1997). Schepen van de Koninklijke Marine in W.O. II (in Dutch). Alkmaar: De Alk. ISBN 90-6013-522-9.
- van Willigenburg, Henk (2010). Dutch Warships of World War II. Emmen: Lanasta. ISBN 978-90-8616-318-2.
- von Münching, L.L. (1978). Schepen van de Koninklijke Marine in de Tweede Wereldoorlog (in Dutch). Alkmaar: Alk. ISBN 90-6013-903-8.
- Raven, G.J.A., ed. (1988). De kroon op het anker: 175 jaar Koninklijke Marine (in Dutch). Amsterdam: De Bataafsche Leeuw. ISBN 90-6707-200-1.
- Roberts, John (1980). "The Netherlands". In Chesneau, Roger (ed.). Conway's All the World's Fighting Ships 1922–1946. Conway Maritime Press. pp. 385–396. ISBN 0-85177-146-7.
