= HMCS Merrittonia =

Modified Flower-class corvette

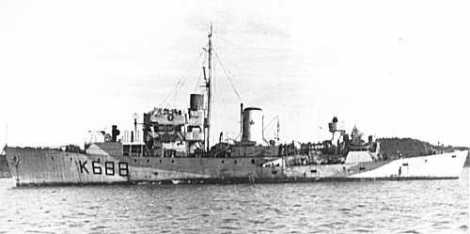
- HMCS Merrittonia

History

Canada
- Name: HMCS Merrittonia
- Namesake: Merritton, Ontario
- Ordered: June 1942
- Builder: Morton Engineering & Dry Dock Co., Quebec City
- Laid down: 23 November 1943
- Launched: 24 June 1944
- Commissioned: 10 November 1944
- Decommissioned: 11 July 1945
- Identification: Pennant number: K668
- Honours and awards: Atlantic 1945
- Fate: Sold for mercantile use 16 November 1945

General characteristics
- Class & type: Modified Flower-class corvette
- Displacement: 1,015 long tons (1,031 t; 1,137 short tons)
- Length: 208 ft (63.4 m)o/a
- Beam: 33 ft (10.1 m)
- Draught: 11 ft (3.35 m)
- Propulsion: single shaft; 2 × water tube boilers; 1 × 4-cylinder triple-expansion reciprocating steam engine; 2,750 ihp (2,050 kW)
- Speed: 16 knots (29.6 km/h)
- Range: 3,500 nautical miles (6,482 km) at 12 knots (22.2 km/h)
- Complement: 90
- Sensors & processing systems: 1 × Type 271 SW2C radar; 1 × Type 144 sonar
- Armament: 1 × 4 inch QF Mk.XIX single gun; 2 × 20 mm Oerlikon twin; 2 × 20 mm Oerlikon single; 1 × Hedgehog A/S mortar; 4 × Mk.II depth charge throwers; 2 depth charge rails with 70 depth charges

HMCS Merrittonia was a modified Flower-class corvette that served in the Royal Canadian Navy during the Second World War. She fought primarily in the Battle of the Atlantic as a convoy escort. She was named for Merritton, Ontario. Her name was altered at the request of the town council. She was originally named HMCS Pointe Claire but it was changed March 1944 before commissioning.

== Background ==
Flower-class corvettes like Merrittonia serving with the Royal Canadian Navy during the Second World War were different from earlier and more traditional sail-driven corvettes. The "corvette" designation was created by the French as a class of small warships; the Royal Navy borrowed the term for a period but discontinued its use in 1877. During the hurried preparations for war in the late 1930s, Winston Churchill reactivated the corvette class, needing a name for smaller ships used in an escort capacity, in this case based on a whaling ship design. The generic name "flower" was used to designate the class of these ships, which – in the Royal Navy – were named after flowering plants.

Corvettes commissioned by the Royal Canadian Navy during the Second World War were named after communities for the most part, to better represent the people who took part in building them. This idea was put forth by Admiral Percy W. Nelles. Sponsors were commonly associated with the community for which the ship was named. Royal Navy corvettes were designed as open sea escorts, while Canadian corvettes were developed for coastal auxiliary roles which was exemplified by their minesweeping gear. Eventually the Canadian corvettes would be modified to allow them to perform better on the open seas.

== Construction and career ==
Merrittonia was ordered in June 1942 as part of the 1943–44 Increased Endurance Flower-class building program, which followed the main layout of the 1942–43 program. The only significant difference is that the majority of the 43–44 program replaced the 2-pounder Mk.VIII single "pom-pom" anti-aircraft gun with 2 twin 20-mm and 2 single 20-mm anti-aircraft guns. Merrittonia was laid down by Morton Engineering & Dry Dock Co. at Quebec City, Quebec 23 November 1943 and launched 24 June 1944. She was commissioned into the RCN 10 November 1944 at Quebec City.

After working up in Bermuda Merrittonia was assigned to the Mid-Ocean Escort Force as a trans-Atlantic convoy escort. She was allocated to escort group C-7 and remained with the unit until the end of the war. She made her return trip to Canada in June 1945.

Merrittonia was paid off 11 July 1945 at Sorel, Quebec and laid up. She was transferred to the War Assets Corporation and sold for mercantile use to K.C Irving Ltd. out of Moncton on 16 November 1945. While being towed to her new owners she was wrecked on the coast of Nova Scotia 30 November 1945.
