= HMCS Cobourg =

Modified Flower-class corvette

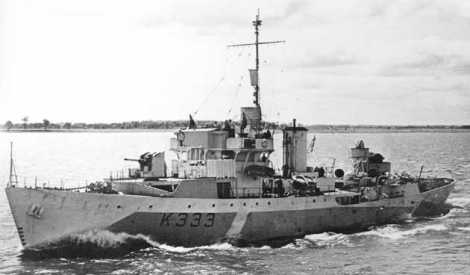
- HMCS Cobourg

History

Canada
- Name: HMCS Cobourg
- Namesake: Cobourg, Ontario
- Ordered: April 1942
- Builder: Midland Shipyards Ltd., Midland
- Laid down: 25 November 1942
- Launched: 14 July 1943
- Commissioned: 11 May 1944
- Decommissioned: 15 June 1945
- Identification: Pennant number: K333
- Honours and awards: Atlantic 1944-45
- Fate: Sold for mercantile use 1945

General characteristics
- Class & type: Flower-class corvette (modified)
- Displacement: 1,015 long tons (1,031 t; 1,137 short tons)
- Length: 208 ft (63.40 m)o/a
- Beam: 33 ft (10.06 m)
- Draught: 11 ft (3.35 m)
- Propulsion: single shaft; 2 × oil fired water tube boilers; 1 triple-expansion reciprocating steam engine; 2,750 ihp (2,050 kW)
- Speed: 16 knots (29.6 km/h)
- Range: 7,400 nautical miles (13,705 km) at 10 knots (18.5 km/h)
- Complement: 90
- Sensors & processing systems: 1 Type 271 SW2C radar; 1 Type 144 sonar
- Armament: 1 × 4 in (102 mm) QF Mk XIX naval gun; 1 × 2-pounder Mk.VIII single "pom-pom"; 2 × 20 mm Oerlikon single; 1 × Hedgehog A/S mortar; 4 × Mk.II depth charge throwers; 2 × depth charge rails with 70 depth charges

HMCS Cobourg was a modified Flower-class corvette that served with the Royal Canadian Navy during the Second World War. She fought primarily in the Battle of the Atlantic as a convoy escort. She was named for Cobourg, Ontario.

== Background ==
Flower-class corvettes like Cobourg serving with the Royal Canadian Navy during the Second World War were different from earlier and more traditional sail-driven corvettes. The "corvette" designation was created by the French as a class of small warships; the Royal Navy borrowed the term for a period but discontinued its use in 1877. During the hurried preparations for war in the late 1930s, Winston Churchill reactivated the corvette class, needing a name for smaller ships used in an escort capacity, in this case based on a whaling ship design. The generic name "flower" was used to designate the class of these ships, which – in the Royal Navy – were named after flowering plants.

Corvettes commissioned by the Royal Canadian Navy during the Second World War were named after communities for the most part, to better represent the people who took part in building them. This idea was put forth by Admiral Percy W. Nelles. Sponsors were commonly associated with the community for which the ship was named. Royal Navy corvettes were designed as open sea escorts, while Canadian corvettes were developed for coastal auxiliary roles which was exemplified by their minesweeping gear. Eventually the Canadian corvettes would be modified to allow them to perform better on the open seas.

== Construction ==
Cobourg was ordered April 1942 as part of the 1942-43 modified Flower-class building programme. This programme was known as the Increased Endurance (IE). Many changes were made, all from lessons that had been learned in previous versions of the Flower-class. The bridge was made a full deck higher and built to naval standards instead of the more civilian-like bridges of previous versions. The platform for the 4-inch main gun was raised to minimize the amount of spray over it and to provide a better field of fire. It was also connected to the wheelhouse by a wide platform that was now the base for the Hedgehog anti-submarine mortar that this version was now armed with. Along with the new Hedgehog, this version got the new QF 4-inch Mk XIX main gun, which was semi-automatic, used fixed ammunition and had the ability to elevate higher giving it an anti-aircraft ability.

Other superficial changes to this version include an upright funnel and pressurized boiler rooms which eliminated the need for hooded ventilators around the base of the funnel. This changes the silhouette of the corvette and made it more difficult for submariners to tell which way the corvette was laying.

Cobourg was laid down by Midland Shipyards Ltd. at Midland, Ontario 25 November 1942. She was launched 14 July 1943 and commissioned into the Royal Canadian Navy 11 May 1944 at Midland. During her service, Cobourg underwent one refit. This took place near the end of the war beginning on 2 May 1945. She did not return to service before the war ended.

== Service history ==
After commissioning, Cobourg visited her namesake en route to Halifax. After workups, she was assigned to the Mid-Ocean Escort Force as a trans-Atlantic convoy escort. She was ordered to join escort group C-6 and spent the rest of the war serving with them.

Cobourg was paid off at Sorel, Quebec 15 June 1945. She was transferred to the War Assets Corporation who promptly sold her later that year for mercantile use. She reappeared after conversion as Camco (1,087 GRT) in 1946. In 1947, the ship was renamed Dundas Kent. In 1956 she was sold and renamed Puerto del Sol and operated under a Panamanian flag. On 1 July 1971, Puerto del Sol burned and sank at New Orleans. She was later raised and scrapped at Bowmansville, Texas in December 1972.
