= HMCS Riviere du Loup =

Modified Flower-class corvette

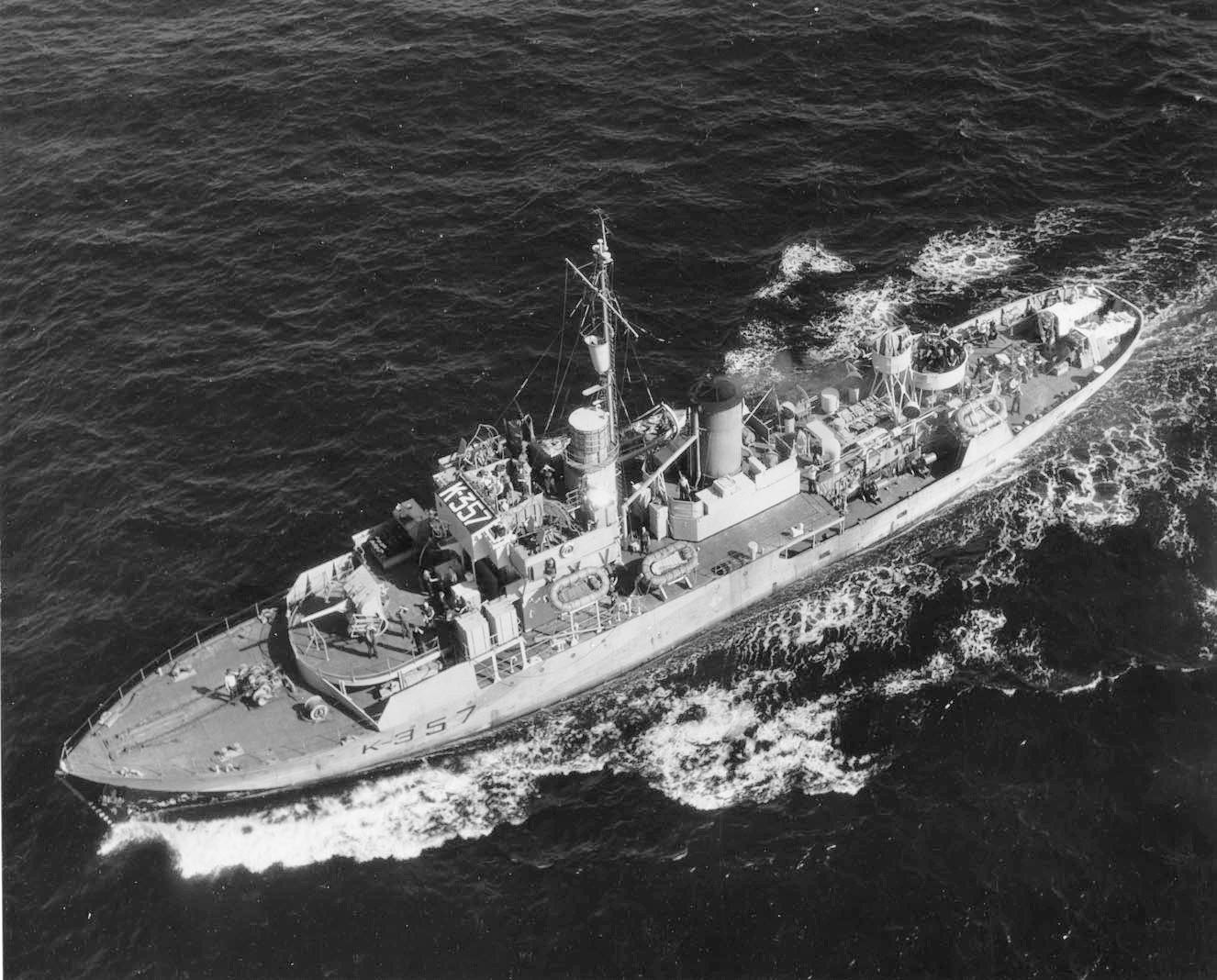
- HMCS Riviere du Loup circa 1944

History

Canada
- Name: Riviere du Loup
- Namesake: Rivière-du-Loup, Quebec
- Builder: Morton Engineering & Dry Dock Co., Quebec City
- Laid down: 5 January 1943
- Launched: 2 July 1943
- Commissioned: 21 November 1943
- Decommissioned: 2 July 1945
- Identification: Pennant number: K357
- Honours and awards: Atlantic 1944-45; Gulf of St. Lawrence 1944
- Fate: Sold 1947 to the Dominican Republic as Juan Bautista Maggiolo.

Dominican Republic
- Name: Juan Bautista Maggiolo
- Acquired: purchased from Canada
- Commissioned: 1947
- Decommissioned: 1972
- Fate: Removed from active list 1972

General characteristics
- Class & type: Flower-class corvette (modified)
- Displacement: 1,015 long tons (1,031 t; 1,137 short tons)
- Length: 208 ft (63.40 m)o/a
- Beam: 33 ft (10.06 m)
- Draught: 11 ft (3.35 m)
- Propulsion: Single shaft, 2× oil fired water tube boilers, 1 triple-expansion reciprocating steam engine, 2,750 ihp (2,050 kW)
- Speed: 16 knots (29.6 km/h)
- Range: 3,500 nautical miles (6,482 km) at 12 knots (22.2 km/h)
- Complement: 90
- Sensors & processing systems: One Type 271 SW2C radar, one Type 144 sonar
- Armament: 1 × 4 in (102 mm) QF Mk XIX naval gun; 2 × 20 mm Oerlikon twin; 2 × 20 mm Oerlikon single; 1 × Hedgehog A/S mortar; 4 × Mk.II depth charge throwers; 2 × depth charge rails with 70 depth charges

HMCS Riviere du Loup was a modified Flower-class corvette that served with the Royal Canadian Navy during the Second World War. She fought primarily in the Battle of the Atlantic as a convoy escort. She was named for Rivière-du-Loup, Quebec.

== Background ==
Flower-class corvettes like Riviere du Loup serving with the Royal Canadian Navy during the Second World War were different from earlier and more traditional sail-driven corvettes. The "corvette" designation was created by the French as a class of small warships; the Royal Navy borrowed the term for a period but discontinued its use in 1877. During the hurried preparations for war in the late 1930s, Winston Churchill reactivated the corvette class, needing a name for smaller ships used in an escort capacity, in this case based on a whaling ship design. The generic name "flower" was used to designate the class of these ships, which – in the Royal Navy – were named after flowering plants.

Corvettes commissioned by the Royal Canadian Navy during the Second World War were named after communities for the most part, to better represent the people who took part in building them. This idea was put forth by Admiral Percy W. Nelles. Sponsors were commonly associated with the community for which the ship was named. Royal Navy corvettes were designed as open sea escorts, while Canadian corvettes were developed for coastal auxiliary roles which was exemplified by their minesweeping gear. Eventually the Canadian corvettes would be modified to allow them to perform better on the open seas.

== Construction ==
Riviere du Loup was ordered 2 January 1942 as part of the 1942-43 modified Flower-class building programme. This programme was known as the Increased Endurance. Many changes were made, all from lessons that had been learned in previous versions of the Flower-class. The bridge was made a full deck higher and built to naval standards instead of the more civilian-like bridges of previous versions. The platform for the 4-inch main gun was raised to minimize the amount of spray over it and to provide a better field of fire. It was also connected to the wheelhouse by a wide platform that was now the base for the Hedgehog anti-submarine mortar that this version was armed with. Along with the new Hedgehog, this version got the new QF 4-inch Mk XIX main gun, which was semi-automatic, used fixed ammunition and had the ability to elevate higher giving it an anti-aircraft ability.

Other superficial changes to this version include an upright funnel and pressurized boiler rooms which eliminated the need for hooded ventilators around the base of the funnel. This changes the silhouette of the corvette and made it more difficult for submariners to tell which way the corvette was laying.

Riviere du Loup was laid down by Morton Engineering & Dry Dock Co. at Quebec City, Quebec 5 January 1943 and was launched 2 July 1943. She was commissioned into the Royal Canadian Navy 21 November 1943 at Quebec City. After arriving at Halifax she needed a month's repairs after developing issues en route. After working up she had continuing engine mechanical problems and required further repairs. During her repairs she lost most of her original crew which were reassigned and once the repairs were completed, she received almost an entirely new crew that needed to workup in Bermuda.

== Service history ==
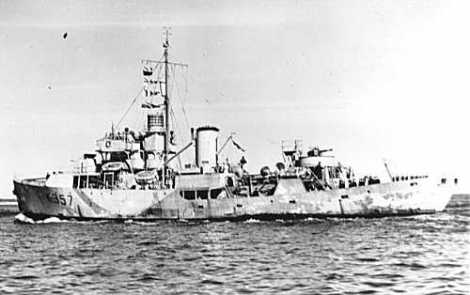
Riviere du Loup during wartime

Riviere de Loup joined the Western Escort Force in September 1944. She was initially assigned to escort group W-3 for a brief period before reassignment. She joined the Mid-Ocean Escort Force (MOEF) in October 1944 as part of escort group C-3. She escorted her first convoy as a trans-Atlantic convoy escort in November but developed mechanical issues again and underwent repairs at Belfast upon arrival. She returned to active service as a MOEF escort in May 1945 and remained as such until the end of the war.

Riviere de Loup was paid off 2 July 1945 at Sorel, Quebec and placed in reserve. She was transferred to the War Assets Corporation and sold to the Dominican Navy in 1947. She was renamed Juan Bautista Maggiolo. She was broken up in 1972.
