= USS Alacrity (PG-87) =

Gunboat of the United States Navy

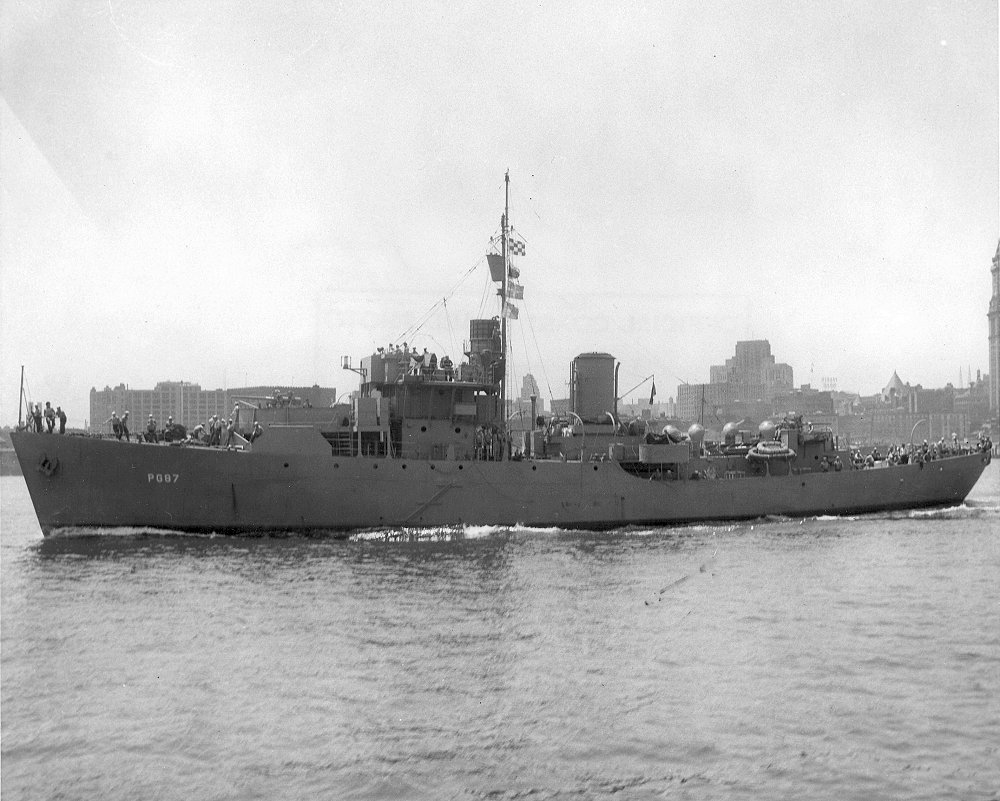

History

United States
- Name: USS Alacrity
- Builder: Collingwood Shipyards Ltd., Collingwood
- Launched: 4 September 1942
- Acquired: 6 January 1942
- Commissioned: 10 December 1942
- Decommissioned: 4 October 1945
- Stricken: 24 October 1945
- Home port: Charleston, South Carolina
- Fate: Sold to Italy, 1947

General characteristics
- Class & type: Action class
- Type: Patrol boat
- Displacement: 1,375 long tons (1,397 t)
- Length: 205 ft (62 m)
- Beam: 33 ft (10 m)
- Draft: 14 ft 7 in (4.45 m)
- Speed: 16.5 kn (19.0 mph; 30.6 km/h)
- Complement: 90
- Armament: two 3 in (76 mm) dual purpose gun mounts, two 20 mm gun mounts and two depth charge tracks

USS Alacrity (PG-87) was an Action-class patrol boat acquired by the United States Navy for the task of patrolling American coastal waters during World War II.

The gunboat was constructed in Collingwood, Ontario, Canada by the Collingwood Shipyard, Ltd. as the British Flower-class corvette HMS Cornel (K-278). It was transferred to the U. S. Navy on 6 January 1942; launched on 4 September 1942; and commissioned at Collingwood on 10 December 1942. She was the second ship to be named Alacrity by the U.S. Navy.

== World War II ==
By 31 December, the gunboat had moved to Sorel, Quebec, where she remained into March 1943. On 3 March, she got underway to descend the St. Lawrence River, bound ultimately for Boston, Massachusetts. On 5 March, she stopped at Quebec, Canada, and remained there for two months. Alacrity resumed her voyage on 5 May and arrived at the Boston Navy Yard Annex on 12 May. She remained there until sometime in mid-July, when she sailed for Bermuda and shakedown training in the waters surrounding that island group. She completed shakedown on 15 August and arrived in New York City three days later. After a round-trip voyage apiece to Norfolk, Virginia, and Boston, Alacrity entered the navy yard at Boston for post-shakedown repairs on 21 September.

=== East Coast operations ===
She got underway again on 25 September and began escorting ships between New York City and the Caribbean. For the next eight months, the gunboat screened coastal merchant traffic on the New York-to-Guantánamo Bay, Cuba circuit. Early in May 1944, she added Key West, Florida, to her itinerary, but soon thereafter resumed her New York-Guantánamo Bay shuttles exclusively. In May 1945, she ceased voyages to Cuba when she was reassigned from the Atlantic Fleet to the Eastern Sea Frontier. For the remainder of the war, Alacrity served along the east coast—first at Staten Island, then at New York, and – by mid-July – at Charleston, South Carolina. By 1 August 1945, although still based at Charleston, she had been reassigned to the 6th Naval District.

== Post-war decommissioning ==
She was still at Charleston when placed out of commission on 4 October 1945. Her name was struck from the Naval Vessel Register on 24 October. She was transferred to the War Shipping Administration on 22 September 1947 for final disposition.
