= HMIS Assam =

Modified Flower-class corvette

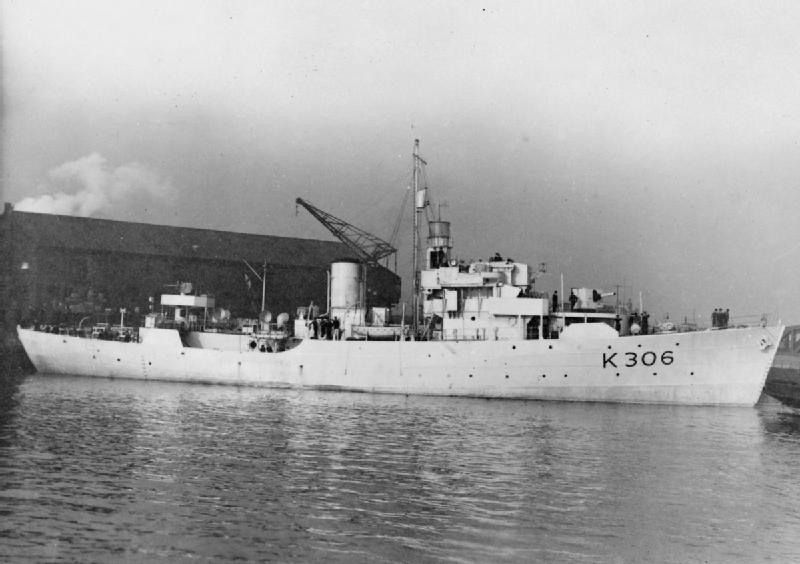

History

United Kingdom
- Name: Bugloss
- Ordered: 15 May 1942
- Builder: John Crown & Sons Ltd
- Laid down: 26 November 1942
- Launched: 21 June 1943
- Commissioned: 19 February 1945
- Fate: Scrapped

India
- Name: Assam
- Acquired: 19 February 1945
- Commissioned: 19 February 1945
- Out of service: 1947

General characteristics
- Class & type: Flower-class corvette (modified)
- Displacement: 1,015 long tons (1,031 t; 1,137 short tons)
- Length: 208 ft (63.40 m)o/a
- Beam: 33 ft (10.06 m)
- Draught: 11 ft (3.35 m)
- Propulsion: single shaft, 2× oil fired water tube boilers, 1 triple-expansion reciprocating steam engine, 2,750 ihp (2,050 kW)
- Speed: 16 knots (29.6 km/h)
- Range: 3,500 nautical miles (6,482 km) at 12 knots (22.2 km/h)
- Complement: 90
- Sensors & processing systems: One Type 271 SW2C radar, one Type 144 sonar
- Armament: 1 × 4 in (102 mm) BL Mk.IX single gun; 1 × 2-pounder Mk.VIII single "pom-pom"; 2 × 20 mm Oerlikon single; 1 × Hedgehog A/S mortar; 4 × Mk.II depth charge throwers; 2 Depth charge rails with 70depth charges

HMIS Assam was a World War II Flower-class corvette of the Royal Indian Navy. She was originally ordered for and commissioned as HMS Bugloss of the Royal Navy, but transferred to the Royal Indian Navy immediately upon commissioning. She was transferred back to the Royal Navy in 1947 and subsequently scrapped.

== History ==
Bugloss was ordered from John Crown & Sons Ltd for the Royal Navy 1942. She was transferred to the Royal Indian Navy immediately upon commissioning in 1945, and served as Assam until her transfer back to the Royal Navy in 1947.

=== Operations in World War II ===
Assam joined the Eastern Fleet just months before the end of World War II. She escorted numerous convoys in 1945 during the war.
