= HMS Willowherb =

Modified Flower-class corvette

History

United States
- Name: Vitality
- Builder: Midland Shipyard, Midland, Ontario, Canada
- Launched: 15 April 1943
- Fate: Transferred to the Royal Navy, 30 August 1943

United Kingdom
- Name: Willowherb
- Commissioned: 30 August 1943
- Identification: Pennant number: K283
- Fate: Returned to US Navy custody, 11 June 1946, scrapped 1961

General characteristics
- Class & type: Action-class patrol boat
- Displacement: 1,375 long tons (1,397 t)
- Length: 205 ft (62 m)
- Beam: 33 ft (10 m)
- Draft: 14 ft 7 in (4.45 m)
- Propulsion: Two 3-drum express boilers, 2,750ihp vertical triple expansion engine, one shaft.
- Speed: 16.5 kn (19.0 mph; 30.6 km/h)
- Complement: 90
- Armament: 2 × 3"/50 dual purpose gun mounts; 2 × 20 mm gun mounts; 1 × Hedgehog; 4 × depth charge guns; 2 × depth charge chutes

During the first year and more after the United States entered the war against the Axis powers, the United States Navy suffered from an acute shortage of warships, particularly of antisubmarine warfare and escort types. To fill that need, an extensive ship construction and acquisition program was inaugurated. Part of that program consisted of placing orders with British and Canadian firms already tooled up to produce Flower-class corvette. Vitality (PG-100) was such a ship. However, before she was launched on 15 April 1943 by the Midland Shipyard in Canada, she was traded to the Royal Navy under the terms of the lend-lease agreement for a similar ship being constructed in Canada. The British renamed her HMS Willowherb, and she served in the Royal Navy for the duration of the war. On 11 June 1946, she was returned to the custody of the United States Navy. Though carried on the Navy list as PG-100 following the war, Vitality never actively served the United States Navy. She remained idle until sold on 7 May 1947. To whom she was sold and for what purpose is unknown, but one source indicates that she was not scrapped until 1961.
