= HMS Mimosa (K11) =

HMS Mimosa (K11) was a Flower-class corvette that served in the Royal Navy during the Second World War.

== Construction and career ==
She was built at Charles Hill & Sons in Bristol in 1941. She was later transferred to the Free French Naval Forces and renamed FFL Mimosa (K11).

The ship was assigned to supporting convoys during the war. The ship left Greenock in Scotland on 31 May 1942 to escort Convoy ONS-100. On 9 Jun 1942 at 04:10, the ship was sunk was sunk in the North Atlantic Ocean by torpedo from U-124. 67 of her complement wer killed and there were 4 survivors. Many of the dead sailors were from the island communities of Saint Pierre and Miquelon.
