= HMS Linaria =

Modified Flower-class corvette

History

United States
- Name: Clash
- Builder: Midland Shipyards, Ltd., Midland, Ontario, Canada
- Laid down: as CN-309
- Launched: 18 November 1942
- Fate: Transferred to the Royal Navy, 19 June 1943, returned 26 July 1946; Sold, 15 January 1948, and reportedly converted to commercial service; Renamed Porto Offuro

United Kingdom
- Name: Linaria
- Acquired: 19 June 1943
- Identification: Pennant number: K282
- Fate: Returned to US ownership, 27 July 1946

General characteristics
- Class & type: Flower-class corvette
- Displacement: 1,375 long tons (1,397 t)
- Length: 205 ft (62 m)
- Beam: 33 ft (10 m)
- Draft: 14 ft 7 in (4.45 m)
- Propulsion: two 3-drum express boilers, 2,750ihp vertical triple expansion Port Arthur Shipbuilding Co. engine, one shaft.
- Speed: 16.5 kn (19.0 mph; 30.6 km/h)
- Complement: 90
- Armament: 2 × 3"/50 dual purpose gun mounts; 2 × 20 mm gun mounts; 1 × Hedgehog; 4 × depth charge guns; 2 × depth charge chutes

HMS Linaria was a Flower-class corvette of the Royal Navy, which saw service during the Second World War. Originally built for the United States Navy as Clash (PG-91), formerly CN-309, she was launched on 18 November 1942, by Midland Shipyards, Ltd., Midland, Ontario, Canada. Upon completion Clash was transferred to the Royal Navy on 19 June 1943, and commissioned as HMS Linaria. On 27 July 1946, she was returned to the US Navy. Never commissioned in the US Navy, Clash was sold on 15 January 1948 for commercial use and reportedly renamed Porto Offuro.
