= HMCS North Bay =

Modified Flower-class corvette

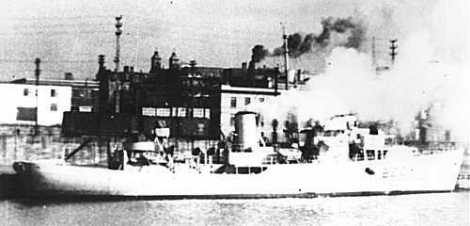
- HMCS North Bay

History

Canada
- Name: HMCS North Bay
- Namesake: North Bay, Ontario
- Ordered: 2 January 1942
- Builder: Collingwood Shipyards Ltd., Collingwood
- Laid down: 29 September 1942
- Launched: 27 April 1943
- Commissioned: 25 October 1943
- Decommissioned: 5 June 1945
- Identification: Pennant number: K339
- Honours and awards: Atlantic 1944–45
- Fate: Sold for mercantile use 1946

General characteristics
- Class & type: Flower-class corvette (modified)
- Displacement: 1,015 long tons (1,031 t; 1,137 short tons)
- Length: 208 ft (63.40 m)o/a
- Beam: 33 ft (10.06 m)
- Draught: 11 ft (3.35 m)
- Propulsion: single shaft; 2 × oil fired water tube boilers; 1 triple-expansion reciprocating steam engine; 2,750 ihp (2,050 kW)
- Speed: 16 knots (29.6 km/h)
- Range: 7,400 nautical miles (13,705 km) at 10 knots (18.5 km/h)
- Complement: 90
- Sensors & processing systems: 1 Type 271 SW2C radar; 1 Type 144 sonar
- Armament: 1 × 4 in (102 mm) QF Mk XIX naval gun; 1 × 2-pounder Mk.VIII single "pom-pom"; 2 × 20 mm Oerlikon single; 1 × Hedgehog A/S mortar; 4 × Mk.II depth charge throwers; 2 × depth charge rails with 70 depth charges

HMCS North Bay was a modified Flower-class corvette that served with the Royal Canadian Navy during the Second World War. She fought primarily in the Battle of the Atlantic as a convoy escort. She was named for North Bay, Ontario.

== Background ==
Flower-class corvettes like North Bay serving with the Royal Canadian Navy during the Second World War were different from earlier and more traditional sail-driven corvettes. The "corvette" designation was created by the French as a class of small warships; the Royal Navy borrowed the term for a period but discontinued its use in 1877. During the hurried preparations for war in the late 1930s, Winston Churchill reactivated the corvette class, needing a name for smaller ships used in an escort capacity, in this case based on a whaling ship design. The generic name "flower" was used to designate the class of these ships, which – in the Royal Navy – were named after flowering plants.

Corvettes commissioned by the Royal Canadian Navy during the Second World War were named after communities for the most part, to better represent the people who took part in building them. This idea was put forth by Admiral Percy W. Nelles. Sponsors were commonly associated with the community for which the ship was named. Royal Navy corvettes were designed as open sea escorts, while Canadian corvettes were developed for coastal auxiliary roles which was exemplified by their minesweeping gear. Eventually the Canadian corvettes would be modified to allow them to perform better on the open seas.

== Construction ==
North Bay was ordered 2 January 1942 as part of the 1942–43 modified Flower-class building programme. This programme was known as the Increased Endurance. Many changes were made, all from lessons that had been learned in previous versions of the Flower-class. The bridge was made a full deck higher and built to naval standards instead of the more civilian-like bridges of previous versions. The platform for the 4-inch main gun was raised to minimize the amount of spray over it and to provide a better field of fire. It was also connected to the wheelhouse by a wide platform that was now the base for the Hedgehog anti-submarine mortar that this version was armed with. Along with the new Hedgehog, this version got the new QF 4-inch Mk XIX main gun, which was semi-automatic, used fixed ammunition and had the ability to elevate higher giving it an anti-aircraft ability.

Other superficial changes to this version include an upright funnel and pressurized boiler rooms which eliminated the need for hooded ventilators around the base of the funnel. This changes the silhouette of the corvette and made it more difficult for submariners to tell which way the corvette was laying.

North Bay was laid down by Collingwood Shipyards Ltd. at Collingwood, Ontario 29 September 1942 and was launched 27 April 1943. She was commissioned into the Royal Canadian Navy 25 October 1943 at Collingwood. North Bay had one significant refit during her war career. The refit took place at Sydney, Nova Scotia beginning on 11 December 1944 and finished mid-February 1945.

== Service history ==
After workups North Bay was assigned to the Royal Navy-controlled EG 9 based in the United Kingdom. She arrived in the UK in March 1944 just as the decision was made to exchange the corvettes for frigates in the group. She returned to Canada in April.

After arriving in Canada, North Bay joined the Mid-Ocean Escort Force (MOEF) as a trans-Atlantic convoy escort. She was assigned to escort group C-4 and remained with them until departing for refit in December 1944. After working up in Bermuda, she returned to MOEF this time as a member of escort group C-3. She remained with this unit until the end of the war.

North Bay was paid off 1 July 1945 at Sorel, Quebec and laid up. She was transferred to the War Assets Corporation and sold for mercantile conversion. In 1946 she emerged as the 1,104 GRT refrigerated cargo ship Kent County II under a Bahamian flag. In 1950 she was renamed Galloway Kent and in 1951, Bedford II. The ship was deleted in 1992.
