= HMCS Thorlock =

Modified Flower-class corvette

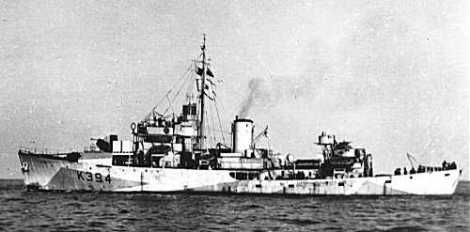
- HMCS Thorlock

History

Canada
- Name: HMCS Thorlock
- Namesake: Thorold, Ontario
- Ordered: June 1942
- Builder: Midland Shipyards Ltd., Midland
- Laid down: 25 September 1943
- Launched: 15 May 1944
- Commissioned: 13 November 1944
- Decommissioned: 15 July 1945
- Identification: Pennant number: K394
- Honours and awards: Atlantic 1945
- Fate: Sold to Chilean navy 18 March 1946

Chile
- Name: Papudo
- Acquired: 18 March 1946
- Commissioned: 12 April 1946
- Decommissioned: 6 April 1965
- Fate: Scrapped 1967

General characteristics
- Class & type: Modified Flower-class corvette
- Displacement: 1,015 long tons (1,031 t; 1,137 short tons)
- Length: 208 ft (63.4 m)o/a
- Beam: 33 ft (10.1 m)
- Draught: 11 ft (3.35 m)
- Propulsion: single shaft; 2 × water tube boilers; 1 × 4-cylinder triple-expansion reciprocating steam engine; 2,750 ihp (2,050 kW)
- Speed: 16 knots (29.6 km/h)
- Range: 3,500 nautical miles (6,482 km) at 12 knots (22.2 km/h)
- Complement: 90
- Sensors & processing systems: 1 × Type 271 SW2C radar; 1 × Type 144 sonar
- Armament: 1 × 4 in (102 mm) BL Mk.IX single gun; 2 × 20 mm Oerlikon twin; 2 × 20 mm Oerlikon single; 1 × Hedgehog A/S mortar; 4 × Mk.II depth charge throwers; 2 depth charge rails with 70 depth charges

HMCS Thorlock was a modified Flower-class corvette that served in the Royal Canadian Navy during the Second World War. She fought primarily in the Battle of the Atlantic as a convoy escort. She was named for Thorold, Ontario. Her name was changed due to local preference. After the war she was sold to the Chilean Navy.

== Background ==
Flower-class corvettes like Thorlock serving with the Royal Canadian Navy during the Second World War were different from earlier and more traditional sail-driven corvettes. The "corvette" designation was created by the French as a class of small warships; the Royal Navy borrowed the term for a period but discontinued its use in 1877. During the hurried preparations for war in the late 1930s, Winston Churchill reactivated the corvette class, needing a name for smaller ships used in an escort capacity, in this case based on a whaling ship design. The generic name "flower" was used to designate the class of these ships, which – in the Royal Navy – were named after flowering plants.

Corvettes commissioned by the Royal Canadian Navy during the Second World War were named after communities for the most part, to better represent the people who took part in building them. This idea was put forth by Admiral Percy W. Nelles. Sponsors were commonly associated with the community for which the ship was named. Royal Navy corvettes were designed as open sea escorts, while Canadian corvettes were developed for coastal auxiliary roles which was exemplified by their minesweeping gear. Eventually the Canadian corvettes would be modified to allow them to perform better on the open seas.

== Construction and career ==
Thorlock was ordered in June 1942 as part of the 1943–44 Increased Endurance Flower-class building program, which followed the main layout of the 1942–43 program. The only significant difference is that the majority of the 43–44 program replaced the 2-pounder Mk.VIII single "pom-pom" anti-aircraft gun with 2 twin 20-mm and 2 single 20-mm anti-aircraft guns. Thorlock was laid down by Midland Shipyards Ltd. at Midland, Ontario 25 September 1943 and launched 15 May 1944. She was commissioned into the RCN 13 November 1944 at Midland.

After working up in Bermuda, Thorlock was assigned to the Mid-Ocean Escort Force. She was allocated to escort group C-9 as a trans-Atlantic convoy escort. She escorted her first convoy at the end of February 1945. She spent the remainder of the war as a convoy escort. On 12 May 1945 while escorting ON 300 she was diverted along with HMCS Victoriaville to accept the surrender of U-190 and escort her to Bay Bulls, Newfoundland and Labrador.

Thorlock was paid off 15 July 1945 at Sorel, Quebec and placed in reserve. She was transferred to the War Assets Corporation and sold to the Chilean Navy in 1946.

=== Chilean Navy ===
She arrived in Chile 12 April 1946 and was renamed Papudo. She served in the Chilean Navy until 6 April 1965 when she was struck. She was sold for scrap and broken up in 1967.
