= USS Haste =

Gunboat of the United States Navy

History

United Kingdom
- Name: Mandrake
- Builder: Morton Engineering & Dry Dock Co., Quebec City
- Laid down: 11 December 1941 as Canadian corvette hull CN-310
- Launched: 22 August 1942
- Identification: Pennant number: K 287
- Fate: Transferred to the US Navy, 6 April 1943

United States
- Name: Haste
- Acquired: 6 April 1943
- Commissioned: 6 April 1943
- Decommissioned: 3 October 1945
- Fate: Sold in 1949 to Carlo Cameli of Genoa, Italy as a ferry/transport and renamed Porto Azzuro; Sold in 1950 to S. A. Nav. Toscana of Leghorn, Italy; Scrapped in 1971.

General characteristics
- Class & type: Action class
- Type: Patrol boat
- Displacement: 1,375 long tons (1,397 t)
- Length: 205 ft (62 m)
- Beam: 33 ft (10 m)
- Draft: 14 ft 7 in (4.45 m)
- Propulsion: two 3-drum express boilers, one 2,750iph Canadian Vickers vertical triple expansion engine, one shaft.
- Speed: 16.5 kn (19.0 mph; 30.6 km/h)
- Complement: 90
- Armament: 2 × 3"/50 dual purpose gun mounts; 2 × 20 mm gun mounts; 1 × Hedgehog; 4 × depth charge guns; 2 × depth charge chutes

USS Haste (PG-92), was one of a group of Canadian corvettes turned over to the United States Navy and crewed by the Coast Guard. She was laid down as CN-310 by Morton Engineering & Dry Dock Co., Quebec City, Canada, and launched on 22 August 1942 as HMS Mandrake. She was taken over by the US Navy, renamed Haste and commissioned on 6 April 1943.

Haste took up regular escort duties following shakedown, making ten voyages to Newfoundland or the Caribbean before November 1944. Small patrol ships such as Haste did much to lessen the effect of U-boat patrols on allied commerce during this critical period of the war. During the period November 1944—May 1945 the corvette served on patrol duty for 10-day periods out of New York. After making two more escort voyages to Newfoundland and return, the ship departed New York 2 July for Charleston, South Carolina, where she arrived 3 days later. Haste decommissioned 3 October 1945 and was returned to the Maritime Commission.
