= HMCS Stellarton =

Modified Flower-class corvette

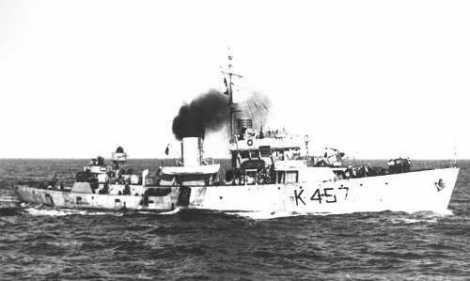
- HMCS Stellarton

History

Canada
- Name: HMCS Stellarton
- Namesake: Stellarton, Nova Scotia
- Ordered: June 1942
- Builder: Morton Engineering and Dry Dock Co., Quebec City
- Laid down: 16 November 1943
- Launched: 27 April 1944
- Commissioned: 29 September 1944
- Decommissioned: 1 July 1945
- Identification: Pennant number: K457
- Honours and awards: Atlantic 1945
- Fate: Sold to Chilean navy 18 March 1946

Chile
- Name: Casma
- Acquired: 18 March 1946
- Commissioned: 12 April 1946
- Decommissioned: 30 December 1967
- Fate: Scrapped 1969

General characteristics
- Class & type: Modified Flower-class corvette
- Displacement: 1,015 long tons (1,031 t; 1,137 short tons)
- Length: 208 ft (63.4 m)o/a
- Beam: 33 ft (10.1 m)
- Draught: 11 ft (3.35 m)
- Propulsion: single shaft; 2 × water tube boilers; 1 × 4-cylinder triple-expansion reciprocating steam engine; 2,750 ihp (2,050 kW)
- Speed: 16 knots (29.6 km/h)
- Range: 3,500 nautical miles (6,482 km) at 12 knots (22.2 km/h)
- Complement: 90
- Sensors & processing systems: 1 × Type 271 SW2C radar; 1 × Type 144 sonar
- Armament: 1 × 4 in (102 mm) QF Mk XIX naval gun; 2 × 20 mm Oerlikon twin; 2 × 20 mm Oerlikon single; 1 × Hedgehog A/S mortar; 4 × Mk.II depth charge throwers; 2 depth charge rails with 70 depth charges

HMCS Stellarton was a modified Flower-class corvette that served in the Royal Canadian Navy during the Second World War. She fought primarily in the Battle of the Atlantic as a convoy escort. She was named for Stellarton, Nova Scotia. After the war she was sold to the Chilean Navy.

== Background ==
Flower-class corvettes like Stellarton serving with the Royal Canadian Navy during the Second World War were different from earlier and more traditional sail-driven corvettes. The "corvette" designation was created by the French as a class of small warships; the Royal Navy borrowed the term for a period but discontinued its use in 1877. During the hurried preparations for war in the late 1930s, Winston Churchill reactivated the corvette class, needing a name for smaller ships used in an escort capacity, in this case based on a whaling ship design. The generic name "flower" was used to designate the class of these ships, which – in the Royal Navy – were named after flowering plants.

Corvettes commissioned by the Royal Canadian Navy during the Second World War were named after communities for the most part, to better represent the people who took part in building them. This idea was put forth by Admiral Percy W. Nelles. Sponsors were commonly associated with the community for which the ship was named. Royal Navy corvettes were designed as open sea escorts, while Canadian corvettes were developed for coastal auxiliary roles which was exemplified by their minesweeping gear. Eventually the Canadian corvettes would be modified to allow them to perform better on the open seas.

== Construction ==
Stellarton was ordered in June 1942 as part of the 1943–44 Increased Endurance Flower-class building program, which followed the main layout of the 1942–43 program. The only significant difference is that the majority of the 43–44 program replaced the 2-pounder Mk.VIII single "pom-pom" anti-aircraft gun with 2 twin 20-mm and 2 single 20-mm anti-aircraft guns. Stellarton was laid down by Morton Engineering and Dry Dock Co. at Quebec City, Quebec 16 November 1943 and launched 27 April 1944. She was commissioned into the RCN 29 September 1944 at Quebec City.

== Service history ==
After working up in Bermuda, Stellarton was assigned to the Mid-Ocean Escort Force. She was allocated to escort group C-3 as a trans-Atlantic convoy escort. She escorted her first convoy in January 1945. She spent the rest of the war with the group.

Stellarton was paid off 1 July 1945 at Sorel, Quebec and placed in reserve. She was transferred to the War Assets Corporation and sold to the Chilean Navy in 1946.

=== Chilean Navy ===
She arrived in Chile 12 April 1946 and was renamed Casma. She served with the Chilean Navy until 30 December 1967 when she was decommissioned. She was sold for scrap and broken up in July 1969.
