= HMCS Parry Sound =

Modified Flower-class ship of the Canadian navy (1943–1945)

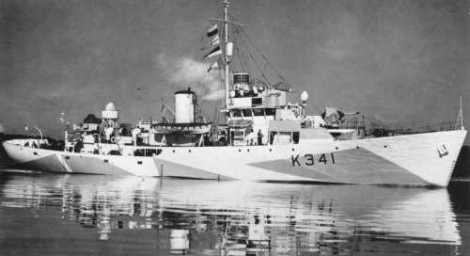
- HMCS Parry Sound

History

Canada
- Name: HMCS Parry Sound
- Namesake: Parry Sound, Ontario
- Ordered: June 1942
- Builder: Marine Industries Ltd., Sorel
- Laid down: 11 June 1943
- Launched: 13 November 1943
- Commissioned: 30 August 1944
- Decommissioned: 10 July 1945
- Identification: Pennant number: K341
- Honours and awards: Atlantic 1944-45
- Fate: Sold for mercantile use 1950

General characteristics
- Class & type: Modified Flower-class corvette
- Displacement: 1,015 long tons (1,031 t; 1,137 short tons)
- Length: 208 ft (63.4 m)o/a
- Beam: 33 ft (10.1 m)
- Draught: 11 ft (3.35 m)
- Installed power: 2,750 ihp (2,050 kW); 2 × water tube boilers
- Propulsion: single shaft; 1 × 4-cylinder triple-expansion reciprocating steam engine
- Speed: 16 knots (29.6 km/h)
- Range: 3,500 nautical miles (6,482 km) at 12 knots (22.2 km/h)
- Complement: 90
- Sensors & processing systems: 1 × Type 271 SW2C radar; 1 × Type 144 sonar
- Armament: 1 × 4 in (102 mm) QF Mk XIX naval gun; 1 × 2-pdr. Mk.VIII single "pom-pom" AA gun; 2 × 20 mm Oerlikon single; 1 × Hedgehog A/S mortar; 4 × Mk.II depth charge throwers; 2 depth charge rails with 70 depth charges

HMCS Parry Sound was a modified Flower-class corvette that served in the Royal Canadian Navy during the Second World War. She fought primarily in the Battle of the Atlantic as a convoy escort. She was named for Parry Sound, Ontario.

== Background ==
Flower-class corvettes like Parry Sound serving with the Royal Canadian Navy during the Second World War were different from earlier and more traditional sail-driven corvettes. The "corvette" designation was created by the French as a class of small warships; the Royal Navy borrowed the term for a period but discontinued its use in 1877. During the hurried preparations for war in the late 1930s, Winston Churchill reactivated the corvette class, needing a name for smaller ships used in an escort capacity, in this case based on a whaling ship design. The generic name "flower" was used to designate the class of these ships, which – in the Royal Navy – were named after flowering plants.

Corvettes commissioned by the Royal Canadian Navy during the Second World War were named after communities for the most part, to better represent the people who took part in building them. This idea was put forth by Admiral Percy W. Nelles. Sponsors were commonly associated with the community for which the ship was named. Royal Navy corvettes were designed as open sea escorts, while Canadian corvettes were developed for coastal auxiliary roles which was exemplified by their minesweeping gear. Eventually the Canadian corvettes would be modified to allow them to perform better on the open seas.

== Construction ==
Parry Sound was ordered in June 1942 as part of the 1943-44 Increased Endurance Flower-class building program, which followed the main layout of the 1942-43 program. The only significant difference is that the majority of the 43-44 program replaced the 2-pounder Mk.VIII single "pom-pom" anti-aircraft gun with 2 twin 20-mm and 2 single 20-mm anti-aircraft guns. Parry Sound was laid down by Marine Industries Ltd. at Sorel, Quebec 11 June 1943 and launched 13 November 1943. She was commissioned into the RCN 30 August 1944 at Midland, Ontario.

== Service history ==
After workups in Bermuda, Parry Sound was assigned to the Mid-Ocean Escort Force in November 1944. She was allocated to escort group C-7 as a trans-Atlantic convoy escort. She escorted her first convoy in December 1944. On 17 January 1945, while escorting HX 332, she developed mechanical defects and was forced to return to port for repairs. The repairs took two months to complete and Parry Sound returned to service as a convoy escort in April 1945. She returned to Canada in June 1945.

Parry Sound was paid off 10 July 1945 at Sydney, Nova Scotia. She was transferred to the War Assets Corporation and sold for conversion in 1950 to a whale-catcher. She reappeared as Olympic Champion in 1950 under a Honduran flag. In 1956 she was sold and renamed Otori Maru No. 15. In 1961 she was renamed Kyo Maru No.22. She was last noted on Lloyd's Register in 1978. The ship was deleted in 1979.
