= HMCS Guelph =

Modified Flower-class corvette

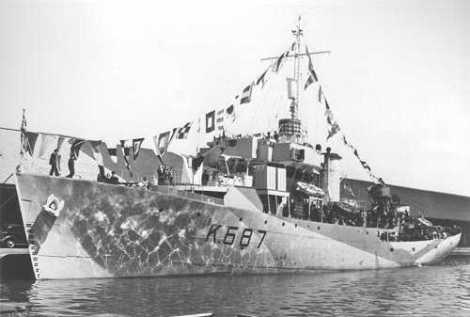
- HMCS Guelph

History

Canada
- Name: HMCS Guelph
- Namesake: Guelph, Ontario
- Ordered: April 1942
- Builder: Collingwood Shipyards Ltd., Collingwood
- Laid down: 29 May 1943
- Launched: 20 December 1943
- Commissioned: 9 May 1944
- Decommissioned: 27 June 1945
- Identification: Pennant number: K687
- Honours and awards: Atlantic 1944-45
- Fate: Sold for mercantile use 2 October 1945

General characteristics
- Class & type: Flower-class corvette (modified)
- Displacement: 1,015 long tons (1,031 t; 1,137 short tons)
- Length: 208 ft (63.40 m)o/a
- Beam: 33 ft (10.06 m)
- Draught: 11 ft (3.35 m)
- Propulsion: single shaft; 2 × oil fired water tube boilers; 1 triple-expansion reciprocating steam engine; 2,750 ihp (2,050 kW)
- Speed: 16 knots (29.6 km/h)
- Range: 7,400 nautical miles (13,705 km) at 10 knots (18.5 km/h)
- Complement: 90
- Sensors & processing systems: 1 Type 271 SW2C radar; 1 Type 144 sonar
- Armament: 1 × 4 in (102 mm) QF Mk XIX naval gun; 1 × 2-pounder Mk.VIII single "pom-pom"; 2 × 20 mm Oerlikon single; 1 × Hedgehog A/S mortar; 4 × Mk.II depth charge throwers; 2 × depth charge rails with 70 depth charges

HMCS Guelph was a modified Flower-class corvette that served with the Royal Canadian Navy during the Second World War. She fought primarily in the Battle of the Atlantic as a convoy escort. She was named for Guelph, Ontario.

== Background ==
Flower-class corvettes like Guelph serving with the Royal Canadian Navy during the Second World War were different from earlier and more traditional sail-driven corvettes. The "corvette" designation was created by the French as a class of small warships; the Royal Navy borrowed the term for a period but discontinued its use in 1877. During the hurried preparations for war in the late 1930s, Winston Churchill reactivated the corvette class, needing a name for smaller ships used in an escort capacity, in this case based on a whaling ship design. The generic name "flower" was used to designate the class of these ships, which – in the Royal Navy – were named after flowering plants.

Corvettes commissioned by the Royal Canadian Navy during the Second World War were named after communities for the most part, to better represent the people who took part in building them. This idea was put forth by Admiral Percy W. Nelles. Sponsors were commonly associated with the community for which the ship was named. Royal Navy corvettes were designed as open sea escorts, while Canadian corvettes were developed for coastal auxiliary roles which was exemplified by their minesweeping gear. Eventually the Canadian corvettes would be modified to allow them to perform better on the open seas.

== Construction ==
Guelph was ordered April 1942 as part of the 1942-43 modified Flower-class building programme. This programme was known as the Increased Endurance (IE). Many changes were made, all from lessons that had been learned in previous versions of the Flower-class. The bridge was made a full deck higher and built to naval standards instead of the more civilian-like bridges of previous versions. The platform for the 4-inch main gun was raised to minimize the amount of spray over it and to provide a better field of fire. It was also connected to the wheelhouse by a wide platform that was now the base for the Hedgehog anti-submarine mortar that this version was armed with. Along with the new Hedgehog, this version got the new QF 4-inch Mk XIX main gun, which was semi-automatic, used fixed ammunition and had the ability to elevate higher giving it an anti-aircraft ability.

Other superficial changes to this version include an upright funnel and pressurized boiler rooms which eliminated the need for hooded ventilators around the base of the funnel. This changes the silhouette of the corvette and made it more difficult for submariners to tell which way the corvette was laying.

Guelph was laid down by Collingwood Shipyards Ltd. at Collingwood, Ontario 29 May 1943 and was launched 20 December 1943. She was commissioned into the Royal Canadian Navy 9 May 1944 at Toronto, Ontario. Due to her late arrival into the war Guelph never had a refit.

== Service history ==
After arriving at Halifax in June 1944, Guelph was assigned to a special escort mission in July. She escorted Royal Navy submarines P.553 and P.554 to Philadelphia where they were being returned to the United States Navy. On 2 August she joined the Western Local Escort Force where she was assigned to escort group W-3.

Guelph continued in that capacity until September 1944 when she transferred to the Mid-Ocean Escort Force (MOEF) as a trans-Atlantic convoy escort. She was assigned to MOEF escort group C-8 until April 1945 when she returned to Canada. She journeyed to Halifax where she became a local escort, performing this duty until the end of the war.

Guelph was paid off 27 June 1945 at Sorel, Quebec and transferred to the War Assets Corporation. She was sold 2 October 1945 for mercantile use to an American buyer who kept the name Guelph after conversion to a 771 GRT cargo ship but registered her under a Panamanian flag. In 1954, the ship was renamed Josephine Lanasa. In 1956 she was sold and renamed Burfin and was last noted on Lloyd's Register in 1964-65.
