= USS Prudent =

Gunboat of the United States Navy

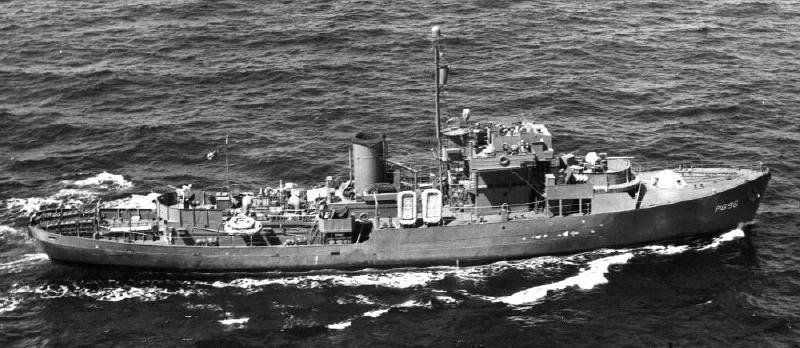
- USS Prudent (PG–96)

History

United States
- Name: USS Prudent
- Builder: Morton Engine and Dry Dock Company, Ltd., Montreal, Quebec
- Laid down: 14 August 1942, as HMS Privet
- Launched: 4 December 1942
- Commissioned: 16 August 1943, as USS Prudent
- Decommissioned: 11 October 1945
- Stricken: 1 November 1945
- Fate: Transferred to Maritime Commission, 22 September 1947; Sold to Italy, 1949

Italy
- Name: Elbano
- Acquired: 1949
- Decommissioned: 1970
- Renamed: Staffetta, 1951
- Fate: Stricken January 1972

General characteristics
- Class & type: Action-class gunboat
- Displacement: 925 long tons (940 t)
- Length: 208 ft (63 m)
- Beam: 33 ft (10 m)
- Speed: 17 knots (31 km/h; 20 mph)
- Range: 7,300 nmi (13,500 km)
- Complement: 87
- Armament: 2 × 3"/50 caliber guns (2×1); 4 × 20 mm guns (4×1); 3 × .30 caliber (7.62 mm) Browning machine guns (3×1); 4 × K-gun depth charge projectors; 2 × depth charge tracks (20 depth charges per rack); 1 × Hedgehog (added 1943)

USS Prudent (PG–96), originally ordered as HMS Privet, was an Action-class patrol gunboat in the United States Navy.

Prudent was laid down by the Morton Engine and Dry Dock Company, Ltd., in Montreal, Quebec, on 14 August 1942; launched on 4 December 1942, sponsored by Mrs. Vincent Godfrey; delivered to the U.S. Navy on 14 August 1943; and commissioned on 16 August 1943.

== Service history ==
Following shakedown off Bermuda, Prudent steamed to New York to begin a series of east coast-Cuba escort runs. Sailing with her first convoy on 7 December 1943, she completed her 11th run, at New York, on 21 December 1944. During January and into February 1945, she patrolled the sea lanes off the New England coast, then on 20 February, departed New York on her last escort assignment to Guantanamo Bay. Returning to New York on 15 March, she resumed patrol duties, and for the remainder of World War II in Europe plied the waters off the northeast coast.

Ordered inactivated at the end of the war, Prudent sailed south on 11 June, to Norfolk, Virginia, thence to Charleston, South Carolina, where she was decommissioned on 11 October 1945. Struck from the Navy List on 1 November 1945, she was transferred to the Maritime Commission for disposal on 22 September 1947.

In 1949 the ship was acquired by the Italian Navy and renamed Elbano. In 1951 she was converted to a hydrographic survey vessel and renamed a fourth time, Staffetta. She continued to serve the Italian Navy under that name until she was discarded in 1970.
