= HMS Smilax =

Modified Flower-class corvette

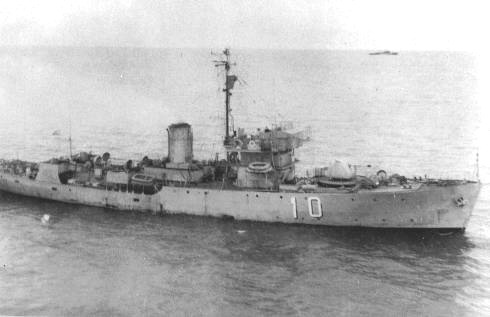
- ARA República (P-10)

History

United States
- Name: Tact
- Builder: Collingwood Shipyards Ltd., Collingwood
- Laid down: in 1942 as Tact (PG 98)
- Launched: 19 November 1942
- Fate: Transferred to the Royal Navy 21 June 1943

United Kingdom
- Name: Smilax
- Commissioned: 15 July 1942
- Decommissioned: 9 October 1945
- Stricken: 24 October 1945
- Identification: Pennant number: K280
- Fate: US Navy custody, 18 October 1946

General characteristics
- Class & type: Action-class patrol boat
- Displacement: 1,375 long tons (1,397 t)
- Length: 205 ft (62 m)
- Beam: 33 ft (10 m)
- Draft: 14 ft 7 in (4.45 m)
- Propulsion: two 3-drum express boilers, 2,750ihp vertical triple expansion Port Arthur Shipbuilding Co. engine, one shaft.
- Speed: 16.5 kn (19.0 mph; 30.6 km/h)
- Complement: 90
- Armament: 2 × 3"/50 dual purpose gun mounts; 2 × 20 mm gun mounts; 1 × Hedgehog; 4 × depth charge guns; 2 × depth charge chutes

HMS Smilax was originally launched as Tact (PG-98), an Action-class gunboat built for the United States Navy by Collingwood Shipyards, Ltd., Collingwood, Ontario, Canada

== War service ==
Tact was launched on 14 November 1942. However, before seeing any service in the United States Navy, the ship was transferred to the United Kingdom under the Lend-Lease program on 21 June 1943 and served the Royal Navy as HMS Smilax until after the end of hostilities in Europe.

== Argentine service ==
Tact was returned to the United States on 18 October 1946 and sold by the Maritime Commission to the Argentine Navy, where she served ARA República until her decommissioning in 1966. She saw some action during the 1955 Revolución Libertadora, when the República defended the rebel naval base at Mar del Plata.
