= USS Action =

Gunboat of the United States Navy

History

United States
- Name: Action
- Builder: Collingwood Shipyards Ltd., Collingwood
- Laid down: 6 January 1942 as CN-304
- Launched: 28 July 1942
- Acquired: 21 November 1942
- Commissioned: 22 November 1942
- Decommissioned: 6 September 1945
- Stricken: 7 September 1945
- Fate: Sold in 1952 to J. Presthus, Bergen, Norway; Converted to a cargo vessel and renamed Arne Presthus. Wrecked 6 April 1972

General characteristics
- Class & type: Action-class
- Type: Patrol boat
- Displacement: 1,375 long tons (1,397 t)
- Length: 205 ft (62 m)
- Beam: 33 ft (10 m)
- Draft: 14 ft 7 in (4.45 m)
- Speed: 16.5 kn (19.0 mph; 30.6 km/h)
- Complement: 90
- Armament: two 3 in (76 mm) dual purpose gun mounts; two 20 mm gun mounts; two depth charge tracks

USS Action (PG-86) was the lead ship of the Action-class patrol boats acquired by the United States Navy for the task of patrolling American coastal waters during World War II. She is the only ship to bear this name.

== Construction ==
Action (PG-86) was laid down as CN-304 on 6 January 1942 by the Collingwood Shipyards Ltd., Collingwood, Canada; launched on 28 July 1942; named Action on 13 August 1942; accepted by the Navy on 21 November 1942; and commissioned on 22 November 1942.

== World War II ==
After she had been fitted out at Boston, Action reported to the Commander, Eastern Sea Frontier, on 23 February 1943. She then assumed escort and patrol duty. Throughout the rest of 1943, all of 1944, and the first half o'f 1945, Action escorted convoys between New York and Guantánamo Bay, Cuba. Her next assignment was to patrol the waters in the vicinity of New York and the Narragansett Bay area.

== Post-war decommissioning ==
Following the surrender of Germany, Action arrived at the Charleston Navy Yard on 28 June 1945; was decommissioned there on 6 September; and she was stricken from the Navy list on 17 September. In October 1946, Action was transferred to the Maritime Commission for disposal.
