= SS Avoceta =

British steam passenger liner sunk during World War II

Coordinates: 47°34′N 24°03′W

- SS Avoceta

History

United Kingdom
- Name: Avoceta
- Namesake: Spanish for avocet
- Owner: Yeoward Line
- Operator: Yeoward Brothers
- Port of registry: Liverpool
- Builder: Caledon Shipbuilding & Engineering Co, Dundee
- Yard number: 279
- Launched: 21 September 1922
- Completed: January 1923
- Identification: UK official number 147174; code letters KNGV; Call sign GFLT
- Fate: Sunk by torpedo, 25 September 1941

General characteristics
- Tonnage: 3,442 GRT; tonnage under deck 3,044; 1,879 NRT
- Length: 319.0 ft (97.2 m)
- Beam: 44.2 ft (13.5 m)
- Draught: 20 ft 9 in (6.32 m)
- Depth: 26.5 ft (8.1 m)
- Decks: two
- Installed power: 395 NHP
- Propulsion: 3-cylinder triple-expansion engine; single screw
- Sensors & processing systems: wireless direction finding
- Armament: DEMS
- Notes: sister ships: Aguila, Alondra

SS Avoceta was a British steam passenger liner. She was built in Dundee in 1923 and was sunk by enemy action in the North Atlantic in 1941. She belonged to Yeoward Line, which carried passengers and fruit between Liverpool, Lisbon, Madeira and the Canary Islands.

Avoceta is Spanish for avocet. Yeoward Brothers had a previous ship called Avocet that was built in 1885 and sunk by U-50 in 1917.

== Building ==
In the early 1920s the Caledon Shipbuilding & Engineering Company of Dundee built two sister ships for Yeoward Brothers, completing Alondra in April 1922 and Avoceta in January 1923. The pair were similar to Aguila that Caledon had built for Yeoward in 1917, having the same size boilers and engine, the same beam and being only 3.7 feet (1.1 m) longer.

Avoceta had nine corrugated furnaces with a combined grate area of 189 square feet (18 m^{2}) that heated three single-ended boilers with a combined heating surface of 7,054 square feet (655 m^{2}). These fed steam at 180 lb_{f}/in^{2} to a three-cylinder triple expansion steam engine that was rated at 395 NHP and drove a single screw.

== War service ==
In the Second World War Avoceta continued Yeoward Brothers' service to neutral Portugal, Spain and the Canary Islands. She made nine trips to Las Palmas, six of which also included a call at Tenerife. Others were to one or another mainland port: one to Almeria, two to Valencia and 11 to Lisbon. Her final visit to the Canaries was in March 1941; thereafter she served only Lisbon and Gibraltar.

Avoceta always joined an outbound convoy to leave British home waters, and then would continue either unescorted or with an OG series convoy as far as Gibraltar. She made her return voyages either unescorted or via Gibraltar and joined an HG series convoy to Liverpool. During German and Italian submarines' First Happy Time in the Battle of the Atlantic, one homeward trip was diverted: Convoy HG 39 left Gibraltar on 21 July 1940 bound for Liverpool, but instead went to Swansea in South Wales.

== Final voyage ==
On 13 August 1941 Avoceta's sister ship Aguila left Liverpool in OG 71. On 19 August 1941 Avoceta followed, leaving Liverpool with Convoy OG 72. On 18–23 August OG 71 became the first Allied convoy to be attacked by a U-boat wolfpack. OG 72 safely reached Gibraltar on 4 September, but there received news that OG 71 had been attacked, ten ships sunk, including Aguila, which had been lost with 152 dead and only 16 survivors.

From Gibraltar Avoceta made her usual round trip to Lisbon and back (2–15 September). In Lisbon she embarked dozens of refugees from German-occupied Europe: UK subjects who had escaped the fall of France and had been denied leave to remain by the authorities in neutral Spain and Portugal. Most were women and children, some of them of French or Spanish origin, several following their husbands to the UK. Once back in Gibraltar, Avoceta also embarked survivors rescued from the loss of Aguila. Her cargo included cork, 573 sacks of mail and some diplomatic bags.

Avoceta was one of 25 merchant ships that formed Convoy HG 73, which left Gibraltar on 17 September bound for Liverpool. HG 73's Commodore, Rear Admiral Sir Kenelm Creighton, KBE, MVO, travelled on Avoceta. In response to the new wolfpack tactic, HG 73's initial escort included three destroyers, one sloop, eight corvettes and the fighter catapult ship HMS Springbank. At first this was successful: on 18 September a Luftwaffe Focke-Wulf Fw 200 Condor found HG 73 and signalled its position and course, but on the moonless night of 21–22 September the destroyer HMS Vimy damaged the Italian submarine Luigi Torelli with depth charges and drove her away. On 22 September another destroyer, HMS Highlander, rendezvoused with the convoy and reinforced its escort. On 24 September an Fw 200 patrol aircraft again sighted HG 73, but a Fairey Fulmar aircraft from Springbank drove it off.

== Attack and loss ==
The next morning the German submarine U-124 sank the cargo ship Empire Stream. Then on the night of 25–26 September the attack increased. Avoceta was in the first row of the convoy, with the Norwegian cargo ship Varangberg in the position astern of her. At 0031 hrs U-203 fired a spread of four torpedoes from their port side. One hit Avoceta close to her engine room and two hit Varangberg. Admiral Creighton was on Avoceta's bridge, and later recalled that when hit "She staggered like a stumbling horse".

Both ships sank quickly, and Varangberg had no time to launch her lifeboats. Avoceta sank by the stern, and her bows quickly rose to such an angle that her lifeboats could not be lowered. However, the liner had three liferafts mounted so as to float clear in the event of a shipwreck, and one of her radio officers survived by clinging to a large piece of her cork cargo that had floated free from one of her holds.

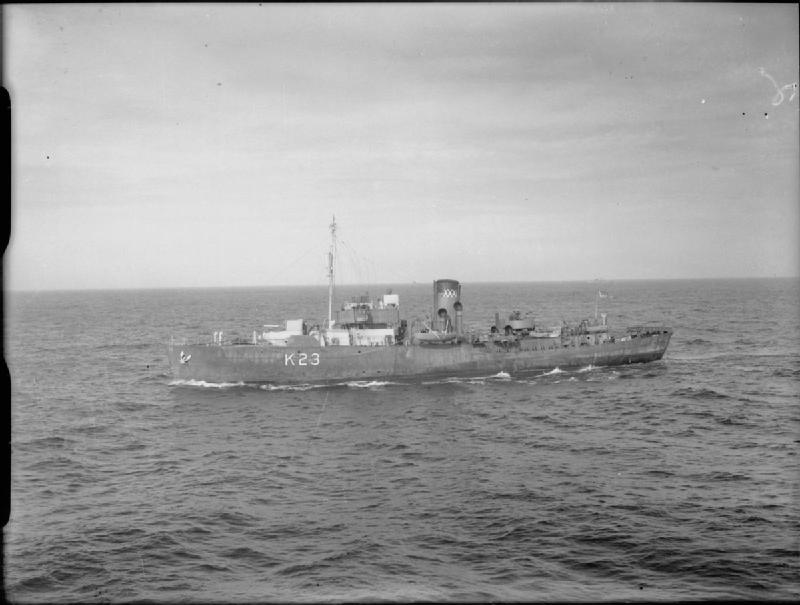
HMS Jasmine rescued survivors from Avoceta and Varangberg

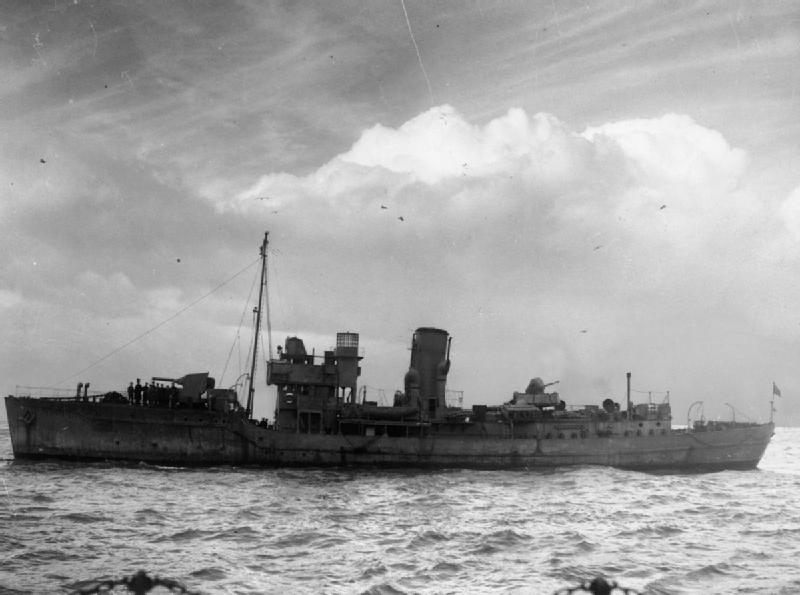
HMS Periwinkle rescued survivors from Avoceta

The Flower-class corvettes HMS Jasmine and Periwinkle rescued 40 survivors from Avoceta. Jasmine also saved six of Varangberg's crew who were clinging to rafts and floating wreckage. The merchant ship Cervantes saved another three of Avoceta's crew. Avoceta's survivors were Admiral Creighton and five of his Royal Navy staff, her Master Harold Martin and 22 of his crew, two DEMS gunners and 12 passengers. A day later U-201 sank Cervantes, killing eight people, but the merchant ship Starling rescued 32 including Cervantes' three survivors from Avoceta. Jasmine and Periwinkle landed their survivors at Milford Haven, Wales.

123 people from Avoceta and 21 crew from Varangberg were lost. Avoceta's dead included 43 crew, nine Navy staff, four DEMS gunners and 67 civilian passengers, including 32 women and 20 children, four of which were under one year old.

== Monument ==
Approximate position of Aguila's wreck

The lost members of Avoceta's crew are commemorated in the Second World War section of the Merchant Navy War Memorial at Tower Hill in London.

== Sources ==
- Prysor, Glyn (2012). Citizen Sailors: The Royal Navy in the Second World War. London: Penguin Books. pp. clxix–clxx. ISBN 978-0141046327.
