= HMS Jasmine =

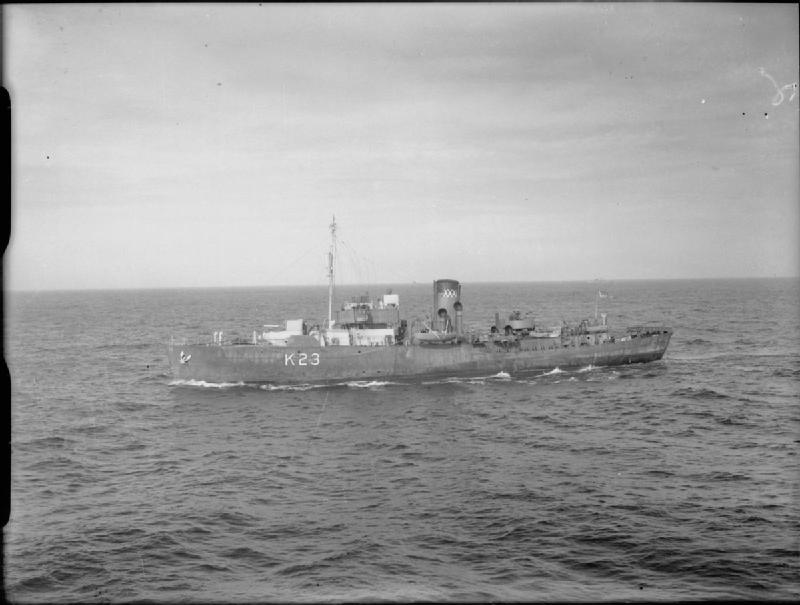
HMS Jasmine, underway at sea during convoy duty

HMS Jasmine (K23) was a Flower-class corvette that served in the Royal Navy during the Second World War. The ship was primarily engaged in convoy duty, protecting merchant ships and carrying out anti-submarine warfare during the U-boat offensive.

== Construction and career ==
The ship was ordered 31 August 1939. She was laid down 12 December 1939 at the Ferguson yard at Port Glasgow, Scotland. She was launched 14 January 1941 and the ship was commissioned 16 May 1941.

The ship sustained collision damage and undertook repairs in October 1941 at the Birkenhead Graving Dock.

Between 17 September and 1 October 1941, the ship served as an escort in Convoy HG 73. On 26/27 September, German submarine U-201 torpedoed and sank the ship's Cervantes and HMS Springbank, whose survivors were taken by several ships, including HMS Jasmine. HMS Jasmine then sank the Springbank by a combination of depth charges and 4-inch gunfire rather than leave her as a hazard to shipping.

On 15 November 1942, Jasmine, along with HMS Inconstant and HMS Nigella engaged German submarine U-181 with depth charges forcing the submarine to a depth of 570ft but failed to destroy her.

The ship was broken up for scrap on 11 September 1948.
