= HMS Nigella (K19) =

Flower-class corvette

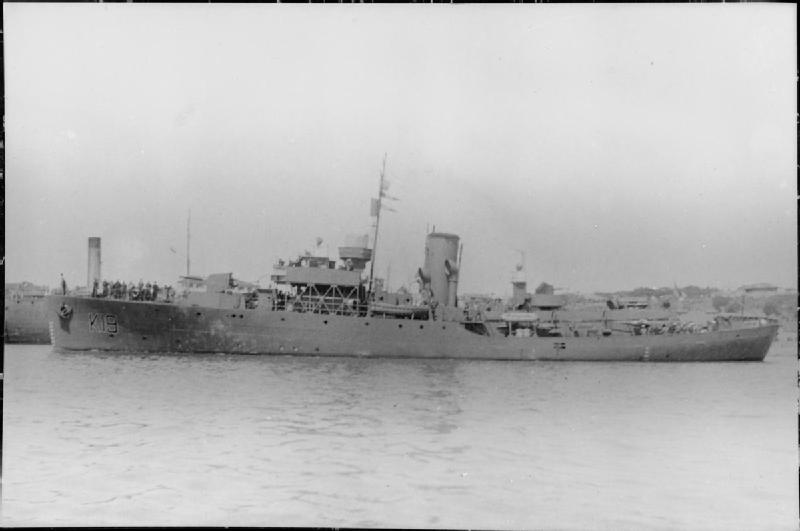

History

United Kingdom
- Name: Nigella
- Builder: Philip and Son, Dartmouth
- Laid down: 28 November 1939
- Launched: 21 September 1940
- Commissioned: 25 February 1941
- Decommissioned: Sold 1947
- Fate: Sold 1947

United Kingdom
- Name: Nigelock
- Operator: Wheelock, Marden Ltd
- Acquired: 1947
- Fate: Sank 10 March 1955

General characteristics
- Class & type: Flower-class corvette
- Displacement: 940 long tons (960 t) standard
- Length: 205 ft 0 in (62.48 m) oa
- Beam: 33 ft 0 in (10.06 m)
- Draught: 14 ft 0 in (4.27 m)
- Installed power: 2,750 ihp (2,050 kW)
- Propulsion: 2 × cylindrical boilers; 1 × 4-cycle triple-expansion reciprocating steam engine
- Speed: 16 kn (18 mph; 30 km/h)
- Range: 4,000 nmi (4,600 mi; 7,400 km) at 12 kn (14 mph; 22 km/h)
- Complement: 85
- Armament: 1 × 4 inch gun; 1 × 2-pounder anti-aircraft gun

HMS Nigella was a Flower-class corvette of the British Royal Navy that served during the Second World War. The ship was built by Philip and Son, Dartmouth, Devon in 1939–1941, being launched in 21 September 1940 and commissioning in February 1941. She operated through the rest of the war, and was sold in 1947, becoming the merchant ship Nigelock. She sank in 1955.

== Design and construction ==
The Flower-class arose as a result of the Royal Navy's realisation in the late 1930s that it had a shortage of escort vessels, particularly coastal escorts for use on the East coast of Britain, as the likelihood of war with Germany increased. To meet this urgent requirement, a design developed based on the whale-catcher Southern Pride – this design was much more capable than Naval trawlers, but cheaper and quicker to build than the Hunt-class destroyers or Kingfisher-class sloops that were alternatives for the coastal escort role.

The early Flowers, such as Nigella were 205 feet 0 inches (62.48 m) long overall, 196 feet 0 inches (59.74 m) at the waterline and 190 feet 0 inches (57.91 m) between perpendiculars. Beam was 33 feet 0 inches (10.06 m) and draught was 14 feet 10 inches (4.52 m) aft. Displacement was about 940 long tons (960 t) standard and 1,170 long tons (1,190 t) full load. Two cylindrical boilers fed steam to a Vertical Triple Expansion Engine rated at 2,750 indicated horsepower (2,050 kW) which drove a single propeller shaft. This gave a speed of 16 knots (18 mph; 30 km/h). 200 tons of oil were carried, giving a range of 4,000 nautical miles (4,600 mi; 7,400 km) at 12 knots (14 mph; 22 km/h).

Design armament was a single BL 4-inch Mk IX naval gun forward and a single 2-pounder "pom-pom" anti-aircraft gun aft. Fifty depth charges were carried, while later in the war the depth charges were supplemented by a Hedgehog anti-submarine mortar. Originally designed for a crew of 25, this had increased to 53 on entering service and to 80 by the end of the war.

Nigella formed part of the second 24-ship order for Flower-class corvettes placed on 31 August 1939. She was laid down at Philip and Son's, Dartmouth, Devon shipyard on 28 November 1939, as yard number 927, was launched on 21 September 1940 and completed on 25 February 1941. Nigella was the second ship of that name to serve with the Royal Navy, and was assigned the pennant number K19.

== Service ==
=== Second World War ===
On 7 May 1941, Nigella was part of the 3rd Escort Group, when the group took over the escort of the westbound Convoy OB 318 south of Iceland. The convoy was spotted by the German submarine U-94, which attacked, sinking two ships before she was driven off by the sloop Rochester and the destroyers HMS Bulldog and Amazon. On 9 May, U-110 and U-201 found the convoy, attacking during daylight as they believed that the escort was absent. U-110 attacked first, sinking two merchant ships, before being counter-attacked by Bulldog, the destroyer Broadway and the corvette HMS Aubrietia, with the depth charges forcing U-110 to the surface where her crew abandoned ship. U-110 was boarded by a party from Bulldog, that seized an Enigma coding machine and other important intelligence items. U-201 also attacked, sinking one merchant ship and damaging another before being detected by Amazon which called up Nigella and the naval trawler HMT St Apollo. The three ships attacked the submarine and its crew noted 99 depth charge explosions over a period of four hours, with the submarine receiving serious damage before escaping. Nigella rescued 45 survivors from the merchant ship Empire Cloud, who had abandoned ship after being damaged by U-201, with the survivors being landed in Iceland while Empire Cloud was towed to safety by the tug Thames.

Nigella took part in Operation Ironclad, the British invasion of Vichy French Madagascar. The corvette left Durban, South Africa on 25 April 1942 as part of the escort of a convoy of landing ships and transports, arriving off the beachhead near Diego Suarez on 5 May. On 15 November 1942, after the U-boat U-191 was spotted by patrolling aircraft, the destroyer Inconstant, found the U-boat, and delivered a sustained series of attacks over several hours, with Nigella and the corvette Jasmine sent to relieve the destroyer and continue the attacks but U-191 broke contact and escaped after sustaining considerable damage.

On 3 March 1943, Nigella and the trawlers Sondra, Norwich City and Viviana were escorting Convoy DN 21 from Durban to the Suez Canal when U-160 attacked, sinking four merchant ships and damaging two more with eight torpedoes. On 12 March 1943, Nigella picked up 30 survivors from the American merchant ship James B. Stephens that had been sunk by U-160 on 8 March while sailing independently. On 25 January 1944, the British merchant ship Fort La Maune was sunk by U-188 near Socatra. The crew took to the lifeboats and were rescued by Nigella on 6 February.

=== Civil operations ===
Nigella was sold in 1947, and was converted to a cargo vessel for the Hong Kong-based shipping line Wheelock, Marden Ltd, operating under the British flag as the Nigelock. She had a gross tonnage of 946 GRT and a net tonnage of 353 NRT. Her official number was 181838 and code letters were MDBJ.

On 18 February 1951, Nigelock was on passage from Shanghai to Fuzhou when she was attacked of the coast of Zhejiang by a Junk flying the Chinese Nationalist flag, whose crew attempted to board, but the boarding attempts failed, and Nigelock escaped. The Republic of China had declared a blockade of the coast of mainland China against the People's Republic of China in what it called the Guanbi policy. On 14 December 1952, Nigelock, on course from Hong Kong to Amoy with a cargo of fertiliser, was chased and attacked by two unidentified Junks, but managed to escape.

On 17 August 1953, Nigelock was intercepted by a Nationalist Chinese warship in the Taiwan Strait, and was being taken under escort to the Pescadores Islands, but the British frigate St Brides Bay intervened and Nigelock able to continue on her way. On 24 August, Nigella was again chased by a Nationalist Chinese gunboat, which broke off the pursuit when the British destroyer Cockade arrived and fired a warning shot.

On 10 March 1955, (Note: 8 March according to the Shipping and Shipbuilding website and the Singapore Standard) Nigelock ran aground and capsized near Fuzhou. All 28 crewmembers survived. The wreck was later bombed and strafed by F-86 Sabre fighter jets of the Republic of China Air Force.

== Sources ==
- Blair, Clay (2000a). Hitler's U-Boat War: The Hunters 1939–1942. London: Cassell. ISBN 0-304-35260-8.
- Blair, Clay (2000b). Hitler's U-Boat War: The Hunted 1942–1945. New York: Modern Library. ISBN 0-679-64033-9.
- Colledge, J. J.; Warlow, Ben (2006) [1969]. Ships of the Royal Navy: The Complete Record of All Fighting Ships of the Royal Navy from the 15th Century to the Present (3rd Rev ed.). London: Chatham Publishing. ISBN 978-1-86176-281-8. OCLC 67375475.
- Elliott, Peter (1977). Allied Escort Ships of World War II: A complete survey. London: Macdonald and Jane's Publishers. ISBN 0-356-08401-9.
- Friedman, Norman (2008). British Destroyers and Frigates: The Second World War and After. Barnsley, UK: Seaforth Publishing. ISBN 978-1-84832-015-4.
- Paterson, Lawrence (2017). Hitler's Gray Wolves: U-Boats in the Indian Ocean. New York: Carrel Books. ISBN 978-1-5107-1776-3.
- Lambert, John; Brown, Les (2008). Flower-Class Corvettes. St. Catharines, Ontario, Canada: Vanwall Publishing. ISBN 978-1-55068-986-0.
- Lloyd's Register of Shipping 1948–1949: Vol. II M–Z: Steamers, Motorships, Sailing Vessels, &c. London: Lloyd's Register. 1948.
- Rohwer, Jürgen; Hümmelchen, Gerhard (1992). Chronology of the War at Sea 1939–1945. London: Greenhill Books. ISBN 1-85367-117-7.
- Winser, John de S. (2002). British Invasion Fleets: The Mediterranean and beyond 1942–1945. Gravesend, UK: World Ship Society. ISBN 0-9543310-0-1.
