= U160 =

U160 may refer to:

- German submarine U-160, one of two German submarines named U-160
- SCSI-160, an implementation of the SCSI (Small Computer System Interface) standards for data communication
