= Skeena =

Skeena may refer to:

- Skeena River, a river in British Columbia
- The Skeenas or Skeena Mountains, a mountain range in British Columbia
- Skeena (federal electoral district), a former federal electoral district in British Columbia
- Skeena (provincial electoral district), a provincial electoral district in British Columbia
- Jasper – Prince Rupert train, a train service operated by Via Rail formerly known as the Skeena
- HMCS Skeena, Canadian Navy ships
- Skeena (sternwheeler), a pioneer sternwheeler on the Skeena River

== See also ==
- Skeena Country
- Skeena—Bulkley Valley, a federal electoral district in British Columbia
- Skeena Crossing or Kitseguecla, a village in British Columbia
