= German submarine U-124 =

U-124 may refer to one of the following German submarines:

- SM U-124, a Type UE II submarine launched in 1918 and that served in World War I until surrendered on 1 December 1918; broken up at Swansea in 1922
  - During World War I, Germany also had this submarine with a similar name:
    - SM UB-124, a Type UB III submarine launched in 1918 and sunk on 20 July 1918
- German submarine U-124 (1940), a Type IXB submarine that served in World War II until sunk on 2 April 1943
