= HMS Periwinkle =

Flower-class corvette

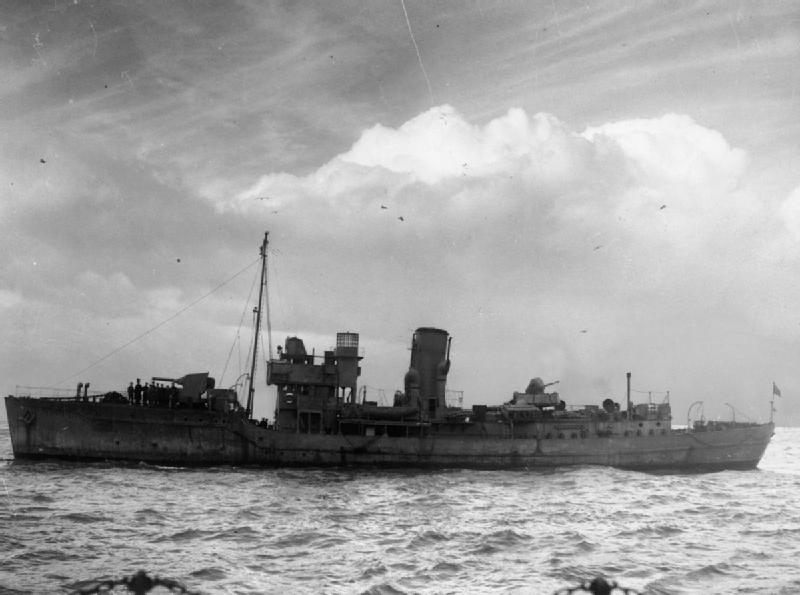
- HMS Periwinkle, October 1941

History

United Kingdom
- Name: HMS Periwinkle
- Namesake: Periwinkle (flower)
- Builder: Harland & Wolff, Belfast
- Laid down: 30 October 1939
- Launched: 24 February 1940
- Commissioned: 8 April 1940
- Decommissioned: 15 March 1942
- Identification: Pennant number: K55
- Fate: Transferred to United States Navy

United States
- Name: USS Restless
- Commissioned: 15 March 1942
- Decommissioned: 20 August 1945
- Identification: Hull number: PG-66
- Fate: Returned to Royal Navy

United Kingdom
- Name: HMS Periwinkle
- Fate: Sold into civilian service 1947, scrapped 1953

General characteristics
- Class & type: Flower-class corvette
- Displacement: 925 long tons (940 t; 1,036 short tons)
- Length: 205 ft (62.48 m)o/a
- Beam: 33 ft 2 in (10.11 m)
- Draught: 13 ft 7 in (4.14 m)
- Propulsion: single shaft; 2 × fire tube Scotch boilers; 1 × 4-cycle triple-expansion reciprocating steam engine; 2,750 ihp (2,050 kW)
- Speed: 16.5 knots (30.6 km/h)
- Range: 3,500 nautical miles (6,482 km) at 12 knots (22.2 km/h)
- Complement: 85
- Sensors & processing systems: 1 × SW1C or 2C radar; 1 × Type 123A or Type 127DV sonar
- Armament: 1 × 4-inch BL Mk.IX single gun; 2 × .50 cal machine gun (twin); 2 × Lewis .303 cal machine gun (twin); 2 × Mk.II depth charge throwers; 2 × Depth charge rails with 40 depth charges; originally fitted with minesweeping gear, later removed

HMS Periwinkle was a Flower-class corvette, built for the Royal Navy during the Second World War, and was in service in the Battle of the Atlantic. In 1942 she was transferred to the United States Navy as part of the Reverse Lend-Lease arrangement and renamed USS Restless, one of the Temptress-class gunboats. With the end of hostilities she was returned to the Royal Navy and sold into mercantile service.

== Design and construction ==
Periwinkle was built at Harland & Wolff, Belfast, as part of the 1939 War Emergency building program. She was laid down on 30 October 1939 and launched 24 February 1940. She was completed and entered service on 8 April 1940, being named for the periwinkle family of flowers. As built, Periwinkle had the short forecastle that was a feature of the early Flowers, and which adversely effected their habitability. She also had the merchant-style enclosed wheelhouse, and the foremast stepped ahead of the bridge, of the original design.

== Service history ==
=== Royal Navy ===
After working up, Periwinkle was assigned to the Western Approaches Escort Force for service as a convoy escort. In this role she was engaged in all the duties performed by escort ships; protecting convoys, searching for and attacking U-boats which attacked ships in convoy, and rescuing survivors. In 23 months of service, Periwinkle escorted 41 North Atlantic, 10 Gibraltar and 10 South Atlantic convoys assisting in the safe passage of over 1500 ships. She was involved in three major convoy battles: In September 1940 Periwinkle was part of the escort for convoy SC 2, which was attacked by a U-boat pack, losing 5 ships sunk. In October 1940 she was with HX 77, which lost six ships sunk. On 14 October 1940 Periwinkle and the destroyer HMCS Skeena rescued 220 members of the crew of HMS Cheshire, which U-137 had damaged by torpedo. In June 1941 Periwinkle was with OB 329, which saw four ships and U-147 sunk; Periwinkle and HMS Wanderer shared in the U-boat's sinking. In September 1941 she was with HG 73, which lost nine merchant and one warship sunk.

=== US Navy ===
Following the entry of the United States into the war, the US Navy was in need of anti-submarine warfare vessels, and to meet this need a number of ships were transferred from the Royal Navy as part of a reverse Lend-Lease arrangement. Periwinkle was commissioned into the USN on 15 March 1942 as USS Restless. After an overhaul Restless was employed as an escort on convoys between New York and the Caribbean. In August 1945 she was decommissioned and returned to the Royal Navy.

== Fate ==
Periwinkle was stricken in 1947 and sold into commercial service as the merchant ship Perilock. She was scrapped at Hong Kong in 1953.
