= Rolf Carls =

German admiral (1885–1945)

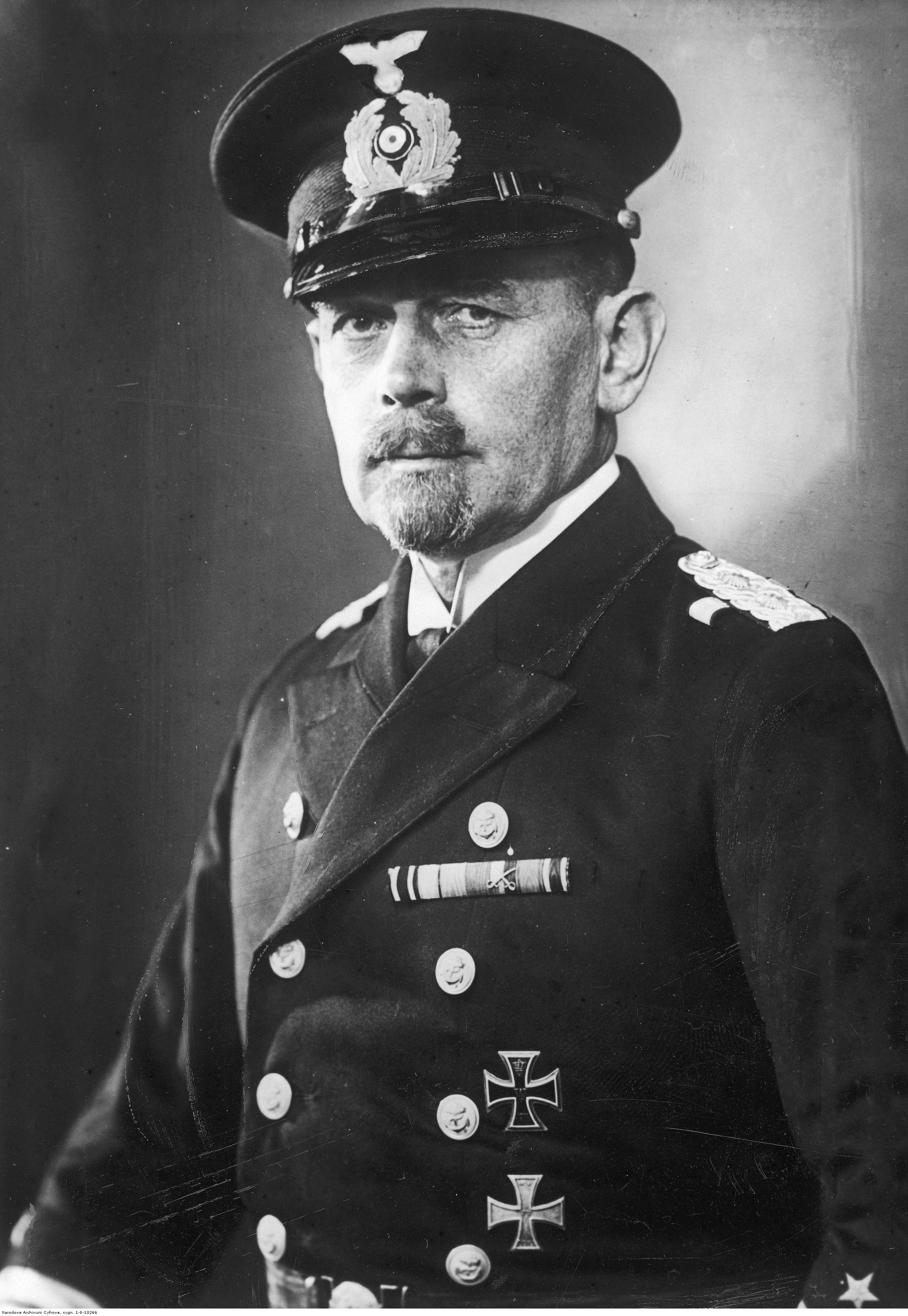
- Born: Rolf Hans Wilhelm Karl Carls; 29 May 1885; Rostock, Grand Duchy of Mecklenburg-Schwerin, German Empire
- Died: 24 April 1945 (aged 59); Bad Oldesloe, Schleswig-Holstein, Nazi Germany
- Military career
- Allegiance: German Empire; Ottoman Empire; Weimar Republic; Nazi Germany
- Branch: Imperial German Navy; Ottoman Empire Navy; Reichsmarine; Kriegsmarine
- Service years: 1903–1943
- Rank: Generaladmiral
- Units: SMS Stein; SMS Mars; SMS Fürst Bismarck; SMS Breslau
- Commands: SM U-124; Hessen
- Conflicts: World War I World War II
- Awards: Knight's Cross of the Iron Cross

Rolf Hans Wilhelm Karl Carls (29 May 1885 – 24 April 1945) was a high-ranking German admiral and deputy to Kriegsmarine commander-in-chief Erich Raeder during much of World War II. Carls served as Flottenchef (Fleet Commander), the navy's highest ranking administrative officer, and was a member of the Oberkommando der Marine (High Command of the Navy). He was instrumental in planning German naval operations during Operation Weserübung – the invasion of Denmark and Norway. When Raeder resigned as head of the navy in early 1943, he suggested Carls as a candidate to succeed him. After Adolf Hitler appointed Admiral Karl Donitz to succeed Raeder, Carls was discharged from the navy. A recipient of the Knight's Cross of the Iron Cross, he was killed in a British air raid on the town of Bad Oldesloe on 24 April 1945.

== Early life and career ==
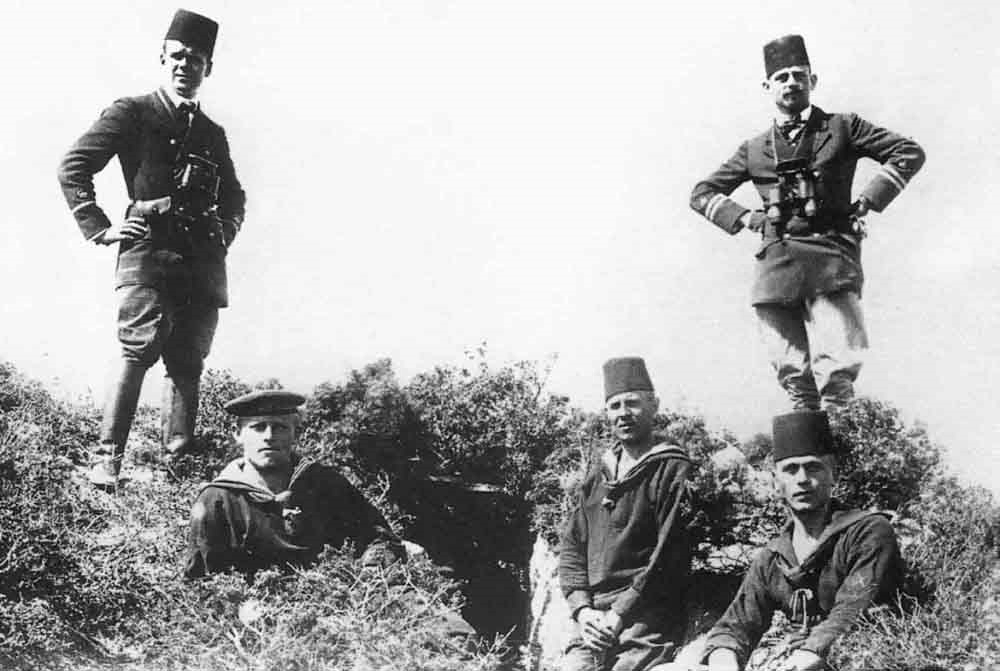
Kapitänleutnant Carls (right) at a naval artillery observation post in the Dardanelles, 1915

Rolf Carls was the son of Lieutenant Friedrich Wilhelm Anton Carls and his wife Martha Victoria Wilhelmine Anna Sophie, née Pogge. He was baptized on 18 July 1885 in the Rostock garrison church. Carls joined the Imperial German Navy as a sea cadet on 1 April 1903 and received his shipboard training on the corvette, SMS Stein. In 1905 he was assigned to the East Asia Squadron, where he was promoted to lieutenant on 28 September 1906. He served until 1907 on the armored cruiser Fürst Bismarck and afterwards the torpedo boat Taku. After his return to Germany in October 1907, he was deployed on various ships before being assigned to the Mediterranean Division in 1914.

At the outbreak of the First World War, Carls served as a captain lieutenant on the light cruiser Breslau. On 4 August 1914 the Mediterranean Division, consisting of Breslau along with the battlecruiser Goeben, was pursued by Royal Navy forces but avoided capture after they passed through the Dardanelles to the friendly Ottoman Empire on 7 August 1914. After the Breslau was handed over to the Ottoman Navy, Carls remained on board the cruiser, which was renamed Midilli, serving as First Artillery Officer. For his service with the Ottoman Navy in the Black Sea against the Russian Empire, Carls was awarded both classes of the Iron Cross, the Gallipoli Star, the Imtiaz Medal in Silver with Saber, and the Order of Osmanieh IV Class.

In mid-January 1917 he was transferred back to Germany and completed his training as a submarine commander on 15 April 1917. He received the first command of his own ship, the U-9 on 31 March 1918, before taking over the U-124 on 21 July 1918, which he commanded until the end of the war.

== Interwar period ==
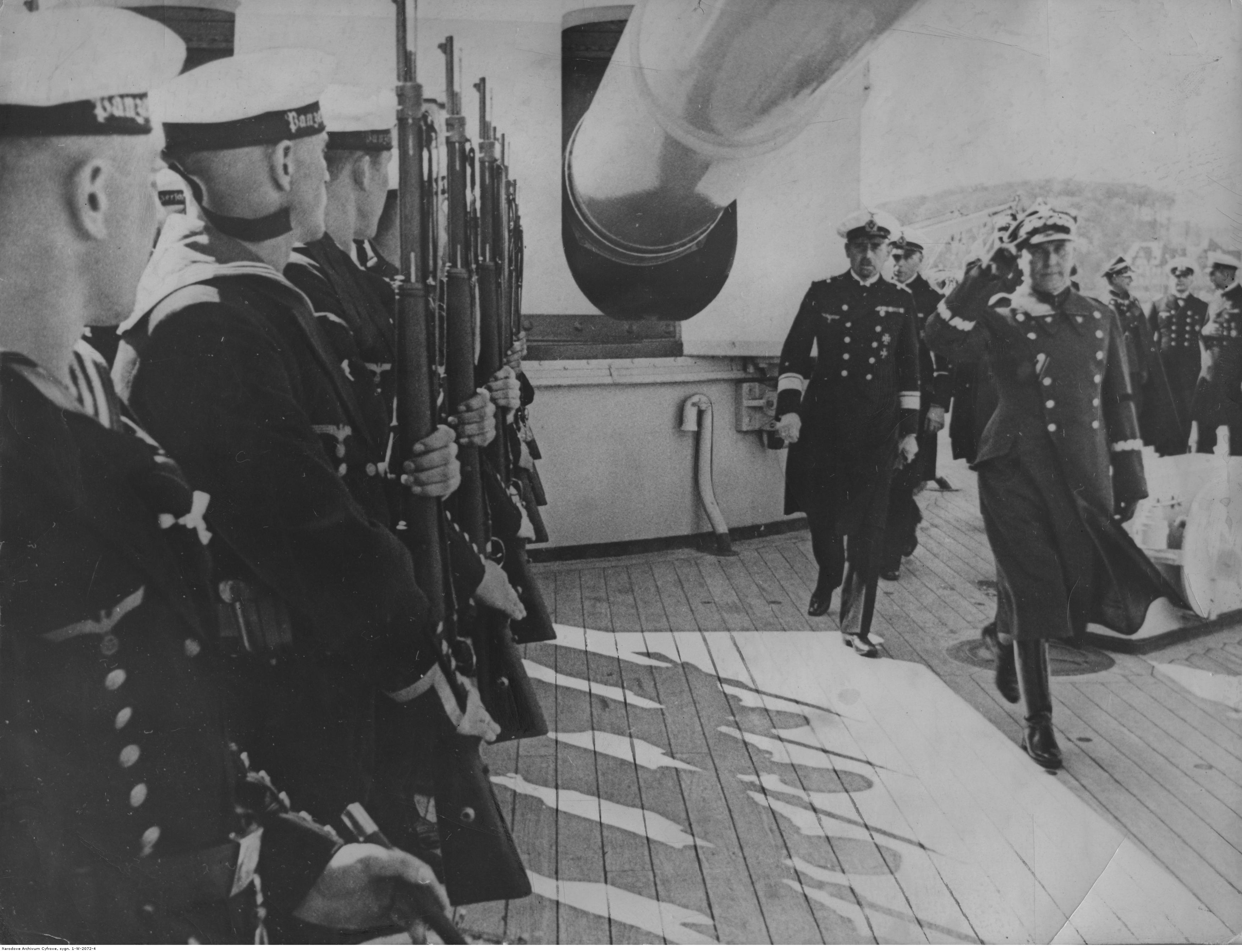
Carls with Polish general Tadeusz Kutrzeba on board the heavy cruiser Deutschland, Kiel, 1935

After the war, Carls joined the freikorps division Marine-Brigade von Loewenfeld, serving as a company commander and battalion commander. In 1922, Carls was transferred to the Reichsmarine of the newly established Weimar Republic. From 18 March 1927 onwards Carls served in various positions in the Naval Administration. On 1 October 1930 Carls served as Chief of Staff of the Naval Command, where he became one of Admiral Erich Raeder's closest aides. Carls was appointed as commander of the pre-dreadnought battleship Hessen on 27 September 1932. On 3 October 1933 he was appointed Chief of Staff of the Fleet. On 29 September 1934 Carls was appointed as Commander of the Linienschiff, he retained this position after his command was renamed to Commander of the Panzerschiffe until 24 November 1936.

Carls acted as commander of the German naval forces off Spain during the Spanish Civil War until September 1936. On 2 August 1936, the cruiser Deutschland and the torpedo boat Luchs under the command of Carls visited the Nationalist-held port of Ceuta. There, Carls had long secret meetings with Francisco Franco and other Nationalist military chiefs in which procedures for further German military aid were coordinated. On 19 August 1936, under the leadership of British Rear Admiral James Somerville, British, Italian, and German warships formed a single squadron to evacuate from the harbour of Palma de Mallorca after Republican authorities announced an imminent naval bombardment of that port. The experience prompted Carls to signal to Somerville that "it would be much better if the nations of Europe could cooperate with each other much as their ships have sailed together here." Somerville's reply affirmed that hope.

At the end of December 1936, he was appointed as Flottenchef (Fleet Commander). On 1 November 1936 Carls took over command of the Baltic Sea Naval Station. As Fleet Commander, the highest ranking administrative officer of the Kriegsmarine and member of the Oberkommando der Marine, Carls was instrumental in drafting Germany's pre-war naval war plans. In a top-secret appraisal of Adolf Hitler's aggressive foreign policy in the summer of 1938, Carls envisaged German hegemony over Europe, the reestablishment of a colonial empire in Africa, and the securing of the major Atlantic sea lanes. Specifically, Carls argued, that such a national policy would entail war with France and the Soviet Union as well as with "a large number of overseas states; in other words, perhaps with 1/2 or 2/3 of the entire world." Carls emphasised that this kind of undertaking would be possible only if the military could make a guarantee of strategic success to the politicians. Admiral Erich Raeder viewed Great Britain and the United States as one Anglo-Saxon ethnic and economic bloc, wherein Great Britain was the "junior" partner. As a result, Raeder and his Naval War Staff from the start anticipated that any conflict between Berlin and London would once more bring the United States in on the side of Britain. Following war games by the Navy High Command in 1938, Carls expressed scepticism about operations in the depths of Soviet territory. He had the following assessment on a possible conflict with the Soviet Union: "...neither Germany nor Russia is in a position to undertake operations of a decisive scale against the other. German operations into Russia will peter out in the vastness of its territory, while Russian operations against Germany, which I do not consider the Russians presently capable of mounting, would shatter on Germany’s defenses."

== World War II ==
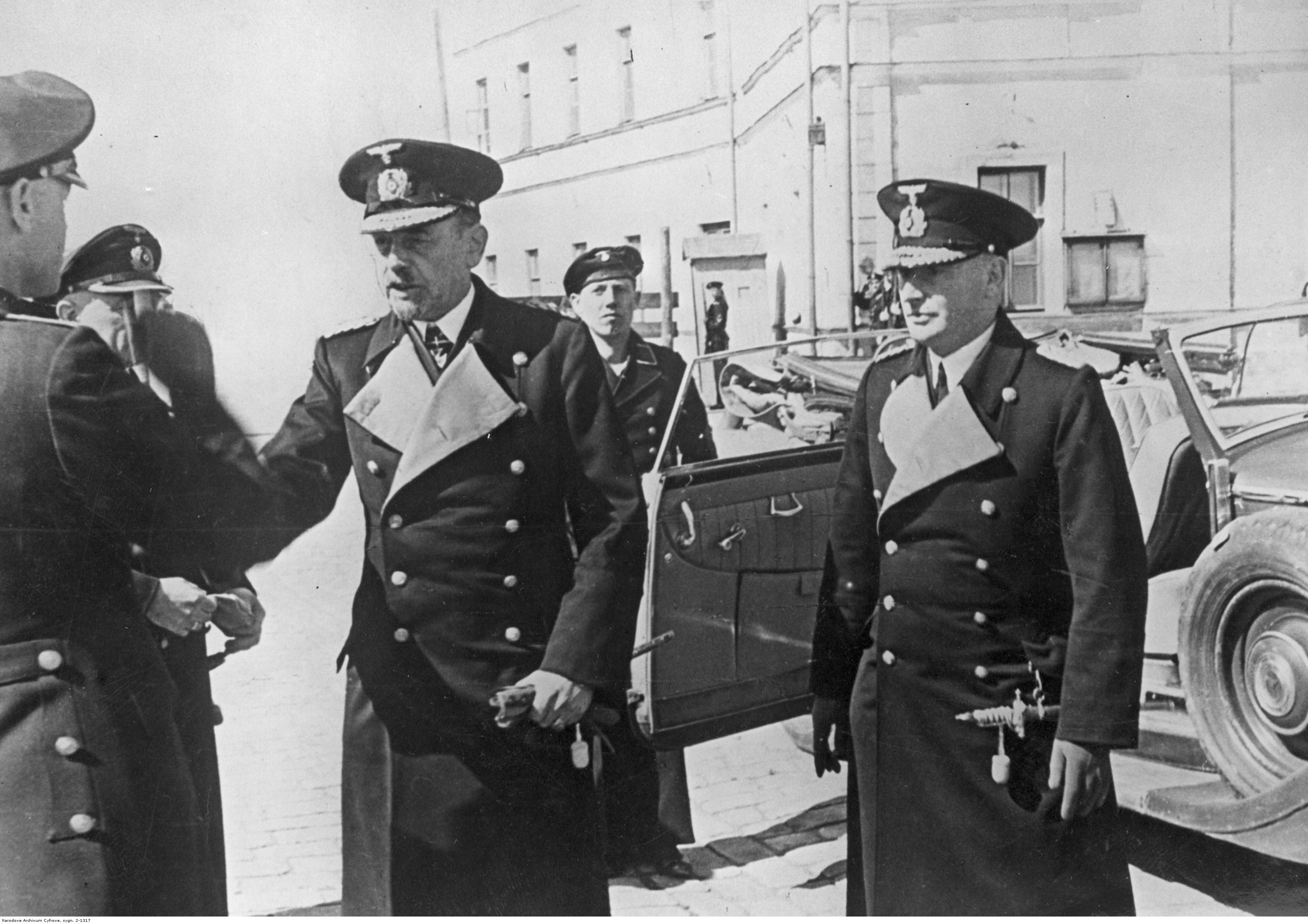
Carls and Rear Admiral Theodor Burchardi visiting a port on the Eastern Front, May 1942

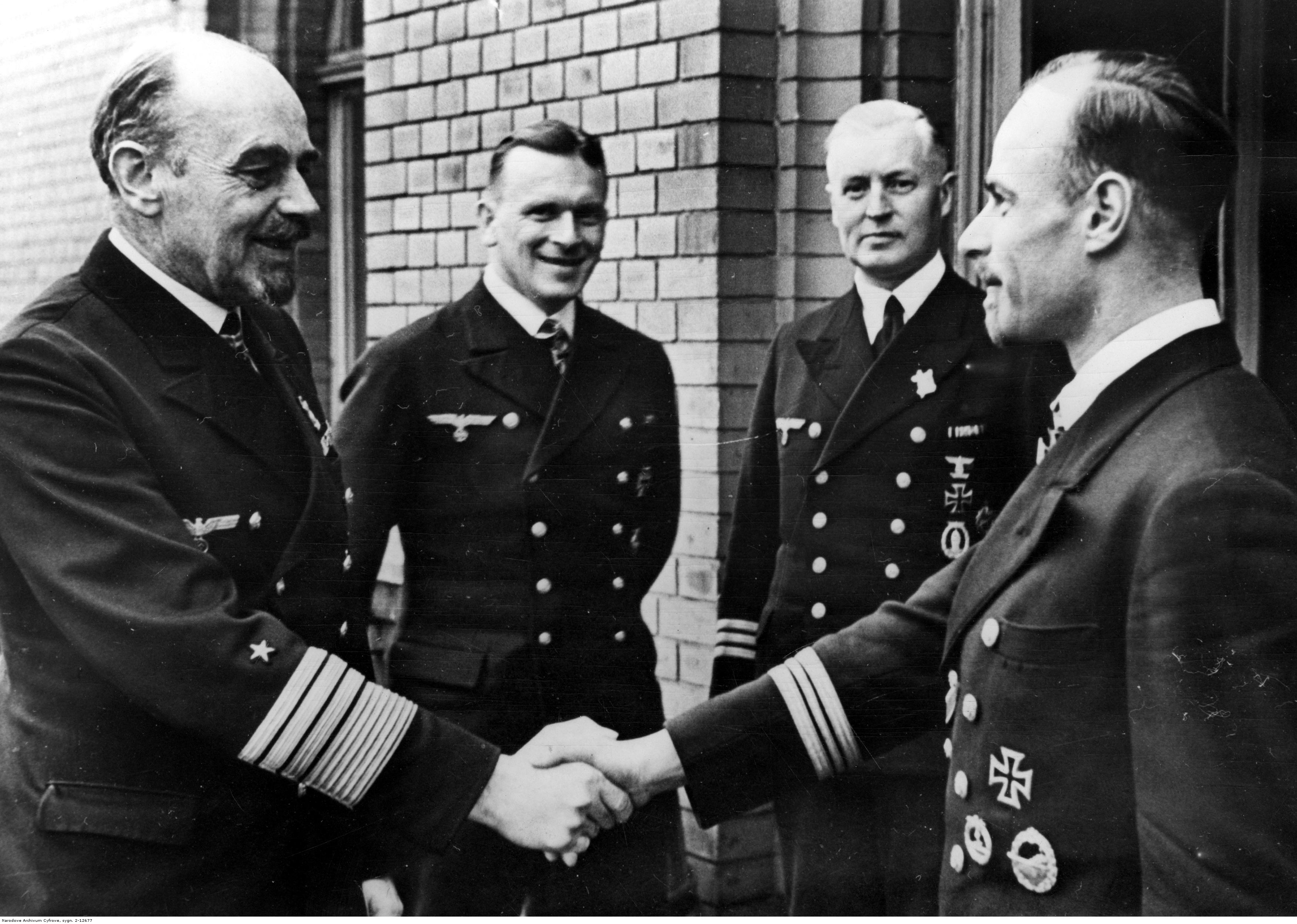
Carls with U-boat commanders Siegfried Strelow (right) and Herbert Schultze (2nd left), November 1942

On 1 October 1939 Carls advised Admiral Raeder of Norway's value to the German navy. A few days later, on 10 October, Raeder met with Hitler and convinced him of the danger of a possible British occupation of Norway. Carls succeeded Vice Admiral Conrad Albrecht as Commander-in-Chief of Marine Group Command East on 31 October 1939. This command was headquartered in Kiel but was moved to Wilhelmshaven and renamed Naval Group Command North. As part of Operation Weserübung, the invasion of Denmark and Norway, Carls was responsible for preparing the naval operations off Denmark and Norway. For this, he was awarded the Knight's Cross of the Iron Cross on 14 June 1940. In August 1940 he was also entrusted with the operational command of the German naval forces in the German Bight, Denmark and Norway. In the autumn of 1941, the units under his command took part in the Baltic Sea campaigns and the conquest of Soviet-held Baltic islands at the beginning of Operation Barbarossa, the invasion of the Soviet Union.

When the commander-in-chief of the Kriegsmarine, Großadmiral Erich Raeder, resigned in early 1943 after clashes with Hitler, he suggested Carls and the Commander of the Submarines, Admiral Karl Dönitz, as candidates to succeed him. Hitler opted for the younger and in his view, more vigorous Dönitz, who became the Supreme Commander of the Navy in January 1943. Possibly to prevent friction among the naval leadership, Carls was honourably discharged from active service on 31 May 1943.

== Death ==
Admiral Carls was killed in an air raid of the Royal Air Force on the spa town of Bad Oldesloe on 24 April 1945, two weeks before the end of the war. (Note: Some sources claim that he was killed on 15 April 1945 while another source indicates that the aerial attack on Bad Oldesloe was on 24 April 1945.) Carls together with 49 other people were killed in the cellar of the Vocational school (Präparandeum) in the Königstraße. Bad Oldesloe was nearly destroyed, and between 700 and 1000 Germans died, mainly women and children.

== Promotions ==
- 1. April 1903 Seekadett (Crew 03)
- 15. April 1904 Fähnrich zur See
- 28. September 1906 Leutnant zur See
- 27. January 1909 Oberleutnant zur See
- 16. December 1914 Kapitänleutnant
- 1. December 1921 Korvettenkapitän
- 1. October 1928 Fregattenkapitän
- 1. May 1930 Kapitän zur See
- 1. April 1934 Konteradmiral
- 17. December 1936 Vizeadmiral (RDA vom 1. Januar 1937)
- 26. May 1937 Admiral (RDA vom 1. Juni 1937)
- 19. July 1940 Generaladmiral
  - 31. May 1943 außer Dienst (a. D.)

== Awards ==
- Kingdom of Prussia:
  - Order of the Crown, 4th Class (19 September 1912)
  - Iron Cross (1914) 1st Class (19 May 1915) and 2nd Class
- Weimar Republic: Silesian Eagle 1st and 2nd Class (27 January 1920)
- Nazi Germany:
  - Honour Cross of the World War 1914/1918 (24 December 1934)
  - Wehrmacht Long Service Award, 4th to 1st Class
  - Spanish Cross in Gold with Swords (6 June 1939)
  - 1939 Clasp to the Iron Cross 1st and 2nd Class
  - German Cross in Gold on 28 February 1943 as Generaladmiral in the Marinegruppenkommando Nord
  - Knight's Cross of the Iron Cross on 14 June 1940 as Admiral and Marinegruppenbefehlshaber Ost (Note: According to Scherzer as commander-in-chief of Marinegruppenkommando Ost.)
- Grand Duchy of Mecklenburg-Schwerin: Military Merit Cross, 1st and 2nd Class
- Ottoman Empire:
  - War Medal (12 August 1915)
  - Imtiaz Medal in Silver with Sabers
  - Order of Osmanieh, 4th Class (February 1917)
- Spanish State:
  - Medalla de la Campaña
  - Spanish protectorate in Morocco: Order of Mehdauia, Grand Cross
- Kingdom of Bulgaria: Order of Military Merit, Grand Officer Cross with Crown and Swords
- Republic of Finland:
  - Order of the White Rose of Finland, Commander First Class
  - Order of the Cross of Liberty, 1st Class with Star and Swords (27 April 1942)
- Kingdom of Hungary: Order of Merit of the Kingdom of Hungary, Grand Cross
- Kingdom of Italy: Order of the Crown of Italy, Knight Grand Cordon

== Notes ==
Military offices
Preceded by Admiral Richard Foerster	Fleet commander of the Kriegsmarine; 21 December 1936 – 31 October 1938	Succeeded by Admiral Hermann Boehm
