= Convoy HG 73 =

Convoy during naval battles of the Second World War

- Part of the Battle of the Atlantic of the Second World War
- Map of the Bay of Biscay
| Date | 17 September – 1 October 1941 |
| Location | North Atlantic |
| Result | Axis victory |

Belligerents
| Kriegsmarine; Regia Marina | United Kingdom |

Commanders and leaders
| Karl Dönitz | Kenelm Creighton |

Strength
| 5 U-boats; 3 Italian submarines | 25 merchant ships; 16 escorts |

Casualties and losses
| | 302 killed; 10 ships sunk |

Convoy HG 73 (17 September – 1 October 1941) was a trade convoy of merchant ships during the Second World War. It was the 73rd of the numbered HG convoys Homeward bound to the British Isles from Gibraltar. The convoy departed from Gibraltar on 17 September 1941. A German reconnaissance aircraft spotted the convoy on 18 September and it was attacked over the next ten days. Nine ships were sunk from the convoy before the submarines exhausted their torpedo inventory on 28 September. The convoy reached Liverpool on 1 October.

== Background ==
=== Bletchley Park ===
The British Government Code and Cypher School (GC&CS) based at Bletchley Park housed a small industry of code-breakers and traffic analysts. By June 1941, the German Enigma machine Home Waters (Heimish) settings, used by surface ships and U-boats, could quickly be read. By mid-1941, British Y-stations were able to receive and read Luftwaffe W/T transmissions and warn of Luftwaffe operations. In June and August several convoys were routed around U-boat wolfpacks, reducing sinkings in August to 80,000 long tons (81,000 t).

=== B-Dienst ===
The rival German Beobachtungsdienst (B-Dienst, Observation Service) of the Kriegsmarine and the Marinenachrichtendienst (MND, Naval Intelligence Service) had broken several Admiralty codes and cyphers by 1939. In 1941, B-Dienst read signals from the Commander in Chief Western Approaches informing convoys of areas patrolled by U-boats, enabling the submarines to move into these "safe" zones. In September 1941, despite more escorts, convoy losses increased during delays in breaking Enigma, if U-boats were near enough to a convoy. On 11 September the Germans disguised grid coordinates by coding them separately and for weeks U-boat orders could only be guessed at.

=== Kriegsmarine and Luftwaffe ===
Map of the Bay of Biscay

To assist the Axis land forces in North Africa and to guard against British landings at Algiers and Oran Oberkommando der Marine (OKM, Grand Admiral Erich Raeder) ordered that along with six U-boats sent to the Mediterranean in September, U-boat attacks were to be made on British convoys to Egypt via Gibraltar. Karl Dönitz, Befehlshaber der U-Boote (BdU, Commander of the U-boats) opposed these orders because the Gibraltar to Britain convoys and their reciprocals were a sideshow compared to the North Atlantic and because most British supplies went around Africa rather than through the Mediterranean. Attacks on Convoy HG 70 and Convoy HG 71 did not inspire optimism, given the number of surface escorts and the extent of air cover that the U-boats had to overcome. Only the best U-boat captains could hope to succeed and even then, the obstacles were formidable.

According to Dönitz, the best U-boat commanders were needed in the North Atlantic, the decisive theatre of the U-boat tonnage war. A compromise was agreed in that attacks on Gibraltar convoys would continue but with smaller wolfpacks of about eight submarines each, searching much further into the Atlantic where RAF Coastal Command patrols were less frequent and there was the possibility that OS (Outbound South) convoys to Sierra Leone and WS (Winston Specials, troop convoys) might be found. U-boats in the area could be reinforced temporarily by U-boats en route to the North Atlantic or returning to France. Kondor long-range reconnaissance bombers based at Bordeaux would search for the convoys.

== Prelude ==
=== Convoy OG 74 ===
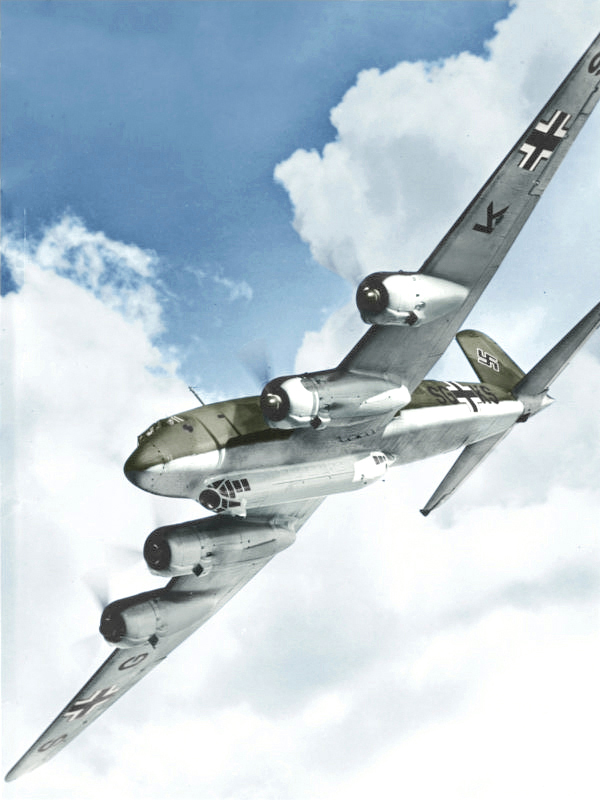
Colourised photograph of a Kondor

For three weeks, no OG and SL convoys were found and gruppe Bosemüller with seven U-boats and gruppe Kurfürst with eight submarines, failed to sink any ships. U-boats and aircraft sighted convoys but the British ability to read U-boat signals encyphered with the Enigma machine allowed them to route convoys away from the wolfpacks in the atrocious weather. U-boats sailed for France or to other operations and the remainder formed gruppe Seewolf but this also came to nothing. U-95 and U-561 were attacked on 14 September by aircraft from Coastal Command and severely damaged, forcing them to abandon the wolfpack. Gruppe Seewolf was disbanded and then northbound ships of Convoy HG 73 were spotted by an Italian submarine west of Gibraltar. Three U-boats were in striking distance but U-371 was en route to the Mediterranean and was ordered to press on. (Note: U-124 was a Type IX U-boat usually thought to be too big, too slow-diving and lacking in manoeuvrability for operations against convoys with plenty of escorts.) U-371 passed Convoy HG 73 and sent a sighting report which allowed U-124 and U-201 to close on the convoy. Searching 600 nmi (1,100 km; 690 mi) west of the English Channel, observers on U-124 saw smoke on the horizon on 20 September. U-124 had found Convoy OG 74 from Britain. BdU ordered Mohr to shadow the convoy and direct U-201 towards it.

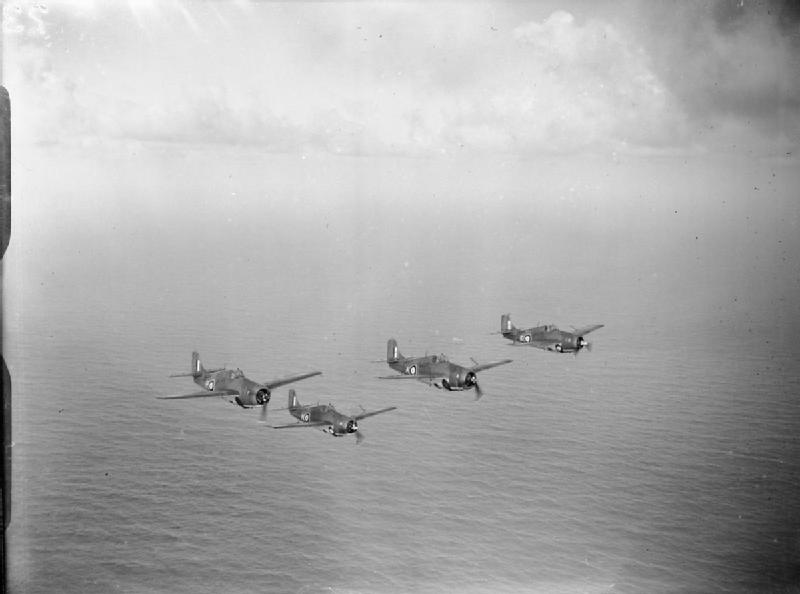
A flight of FAA Martlets similar to those on HMS Audacity

Convoy OG 74 comprised 27 ships with an escort of the 36th Escort Group, the escort carrier, HMS Audacity, the sloop HMS Deptford, five corvettes including HMS Marigold, Arbutus and the Ocean Boarding Vessel Corinthian. The convoy was shadowed until the night of 20/21 September when both U-boats attacked. U-124 obtained three hits from three torpedoes and claimed two ships and a tanker but sank only the small merchant ships Baltallin (1,303 GRT) and Empire Moat (2,922 GRT). The convoy illuminated the night with snowflake star shells which were particularly bright, forcing U-124 to submerge and retire. On 22 September as the two U-boats moved to positions for a resumption their attacks during the night and Kampfgeschwader 40 (KG 40) sent Kondors to attack the convoy. F4F Wildcats (Martlets in British service) from Audacity attacked the Kondors and shot one down; one Martlet strafed U-124 or U-201, forcing it to dive but another Kondor seriously damaged the rescue ship Walmer Castle (906 GRT) that had stopped to rescue survivors from Baltallin and Empire Moat and had not caught up with the convoy and was scuttled by Marigold. The two U-boats attacked after dark on both flanks of the convoy. Three ships were sunk and City of Waterford (1,017 GRT) was lost in a collision with Thames. After four ships for Lisbon were detached, U-201 sank Runa (1,575 GRT), Lissa (1,511 GRT) and Rhineland.

=== Convoy HG 73 ===
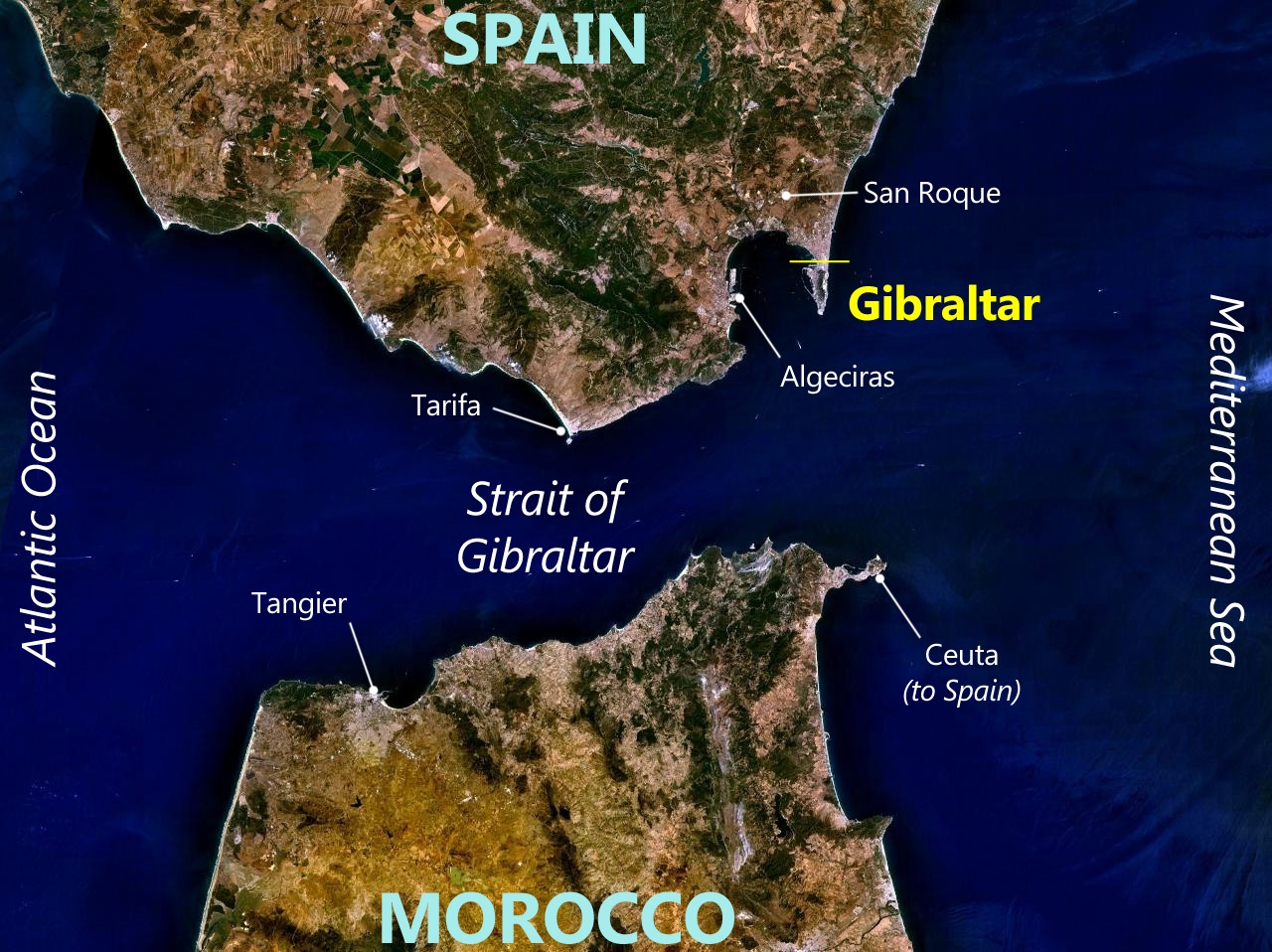
Diagram of the Strait of Gibraltar

Convoy HG 73 comprised 25 ships homeward bound from Gibraltar, some in ballast and others carrying trade goods. The convoy commodore was Rear-Admiral Kenelm Creighton in the cargo liner SS Avoceta and the convoy was protected by a Western Approaches Command escort group consisting of the sloop HMS Fowey and eight corvettes, reinforced by the auxiliary cruiser and CAM ship (catapult aircraft merchant ship) HMS Springbank. The convoy sailed from Gibraltar on 17 September 1941 and German agents across the bay in neutral Spain reported its composition, escort strength and departure time. Kondors of KG 40 from Bordeaux and the Italian submarines Leonardo da Vinci, Alessandro Malaspina, Morosini and Luigi Torelli on patrol west of Gibraltar were ordered to search for the convoy, while three U-boats further north were deployed in a search patrol line across the predicted route of the convoy. (Note: Malaspina had been sunk, possibly by a Sunderland of 10 Squadron RAAF on 7 September.)

=== 18–20 September ===
On 18 September a Kondor sighted Convoy HG 73 off Cape St Vincent; Springback opened fire with its 4-inch anti-aircraft guns, which forced the Kondor to open the range. Petty Officer F. J. Shaw the Fulmar pilot (804 Naval Air Squadron, Fleet Air Arm) launched from Springbank but the Kondor escaped by flying at wave-top height. Shaw returned after half an hour to report that the Kondor was too fast; he could parachute into the water or attempt the flight to Gibraltar and chose the latter, landing safely. This left the convoy with no means to attack a Kondor that appeared next morning. On 19 September the convoy was sighted again, first by Morosini and later by U-371, though both lost contact; Morosini fell out of the pursuit with engine trouble and U-371, en route to the Mediterranean, was ordered to continue on her way. On 20 September the destroyers Duncan and Farndale departed and were replaced by destroyer HMS Wild Swan.

== Action ==
=== 21/22 September ===
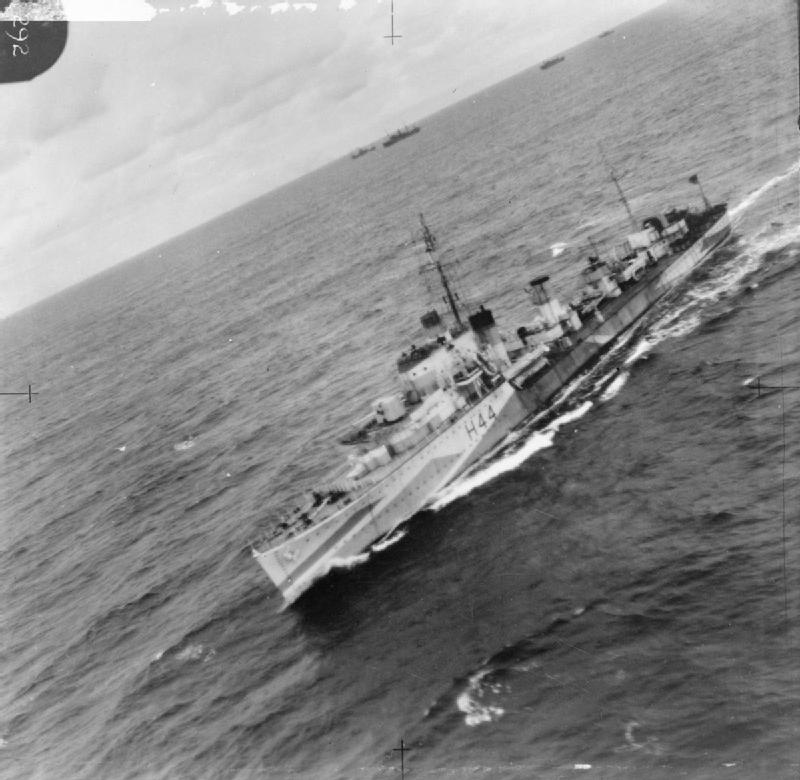
Aerial view of HMS Highlander

Convoy HG 73 was attacked by the Italian boats and on the night of 21/22 September; Vimy attacked a contact and damaged Torelli. On 22 September Vimy and Wild Swan, left the escort, replaced by the destroyer HMS Highlander.

=== 23–25 September ===
On 23 September Da Vinci made contact and shadowed the convoy throughout the day but was unable to attack. On 24 September a Kondor spotted the convoy and reported three ships on fire, though British records show no ships hit. BdU diverted U-203 and U-205 to the attack from France; these arrived over the next two days. On 25 September U-124 made contact in heavy seas and fired on a ship identified as a cruiser; this may have been Springbank but no hits were achieved, Empire Stream was sunk and the survivors rescued by Brgonia, six members of the crew and two stowaways being lost. That night U-203 joined and both U-boats attacked just after midnight U-203 sank Varengberg and Avoceta but came under attack from the corvette HMS Larkspur. A few hours later U-124 sank Cortes and Petrel. Lapwing stopped to pick up survivors from these two ships but was torpedoed just before dawn. Of the 109 men on the three ships only 18 men survived, reaching land after a two-week voyage in an open lifeboat.

=== 26 September – 1 October ===
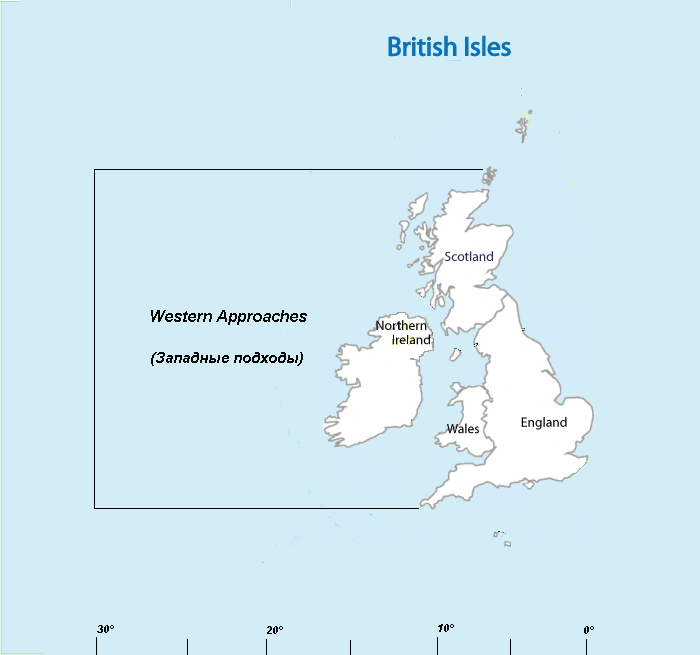
Map of the Western Approaches

On 26 September, Highlander departed from the escort, while U-124 and U-203 continued to shadow. U-201 and U-205 also joined. During the day U-205 was attacked and damaged by an Allied aircraft forcing a return to base. During the night of 26/27 September the three U-boats in contact attacked; just before midnight U-124 sank Siremalm and at 2:00 a.m. U-201 torpedoed and sank Cervantes and Springbank, whose survivors were taken off and then Jasmine sank the ship with gunfire rather than leave her as a hazard. During 27 September the three U-boats continued to shadow and that night U-201 made a final attack, sinking Margareta. The U-boats were obliged to abandon the operation and return to base to re-arm. Convoy HG 73 sailed on without further incident, arriving at Liverpool on 1 October.

== Aftermath ==
Of the 25 ships that departed Gibraltar nine were lost (36 per cent) and an escort vessel was sunk. Of the 177 convoys of the HG series run during the three years between September 1939 and September 1942, thirteen (just over one in ten) were attacked. Of the ships convoyed, 44 (about 20 per cent) were lost. The operation was a victory for the Luftwaffe and Kriegsmarine. The three U-boat commanders who had sunk ships were credited with the destruction of fifteen ships, of 91,000 GRT; the three ships spotted sinking on 24 September were credited to Malaspina, which had failed to return. In 1997, the historian, Clay Blair, wrote that the three ships did not appear in British records. The nine ships sunk amounted to 25,800 GRT.

== Orders of battle ==
=== Allied merchant ships ===
Merchant ships (data from Kindell [2024] unless indicated)
| Name | Year | Flag | GRT | Notes |
|---|---|---|---|---|
| Avoceta | 1923 | United Kingdom | 3,442 | Convoy Commodore, sunk U-203 26 September, 47°57'N, 24°05'W (Note: 123 killed, 36 survivors; in 1999, John Terraine wrote that Avoceta had a crew of forty and 128 passengers, with 28 survivors.) |
| Cervantes | 1919 | United Kingdom | 1,810 | Sunk U-201 27 Sep, 48°37′N, 20°01′W, 8 dead, 32 survivors |
| Cortes | 1919 | United Kingdom | 1,374 | Sunk U-124 26 Sep, 47°48′N, 23°45′W, 36 killed |
| Coxwold | 1938 | United Kingdom | 1,124 | |
| Cressado | 1913 | United Kingdom | 1,228 | |
| Ebro | 1920 | Denmark | 1,547 | |
| Empire Lake | 1941 | United Kingdom | 2,852 | |
| Empire Stream | 1941 | United Kingdom | 2,911 | Sunk U-124 25 Sep, 6 crew, 2 stowaways killed |
| Finland | 1939 | United Kingdom | 1,375 | |
| Lanarhone | 1928 | Ireland | 1,221 | Bound for Dublin |
| Lapwing | 1920 | United Kingdom | 1,348 | Straggler, sunk U-203 26 Sep, 26 killed (Note: The dead included survivors from Cortes and Petrel. Eight survivors and some from Petrel in a lifeboat made landfall at Slyne Bay, County Galway, 9 October.) |
| Leadgate | 1925 | United Kingdom | 2,125 | |
| Margareta | 1904 | United Kingdom | 3,103 | Sunk U-201 27 Sep, crew rescued by Hibiscus. |
| Marklyn | 1918 | United Kingdom | 3,090 | |
| Meta | 1930 | United Kingdom | 1,575 | |
| Panos | 1920 | United Kingdom | 4,914 | |
| Penhale | 1924 | United Kingdom | 4,071 | |
| Petrel | 1920 | United Kingdom | 1,354 | Sunk U-124 26 Sep, 26 killed |
| Rudby | 1924 | United Kingdom | 4,846 | |
| Siremalm | 1906 | Norway | 2,468 | Sunk U-201 26 Sep, 49°05'N, 20°10′W all 27 killed |
| Spero | 1922 | United Kingdom | 1,589 | |
| Starling | 1930 | United Kingdom | 1,320 | |
| Switzerland | 1922 | United Kingdom | 1,291 | |
| Vanellus | 1921 | United Kingdom | 1,886 | Vice-Convoy Commodore |
| Varangberg | 1915 | Norway | 2,842 | Sunk by U-203 26 Sep, 47°50'N, 34°50'W, 21 killed, 6 survivors |

=== Convoy escorts ===
Escorts
| Name | Flag | Type | Dates | Notes |
|---|---|---|---|---|
| HMS Springbank | Royal Navy | Fighter catapult ship | 17–27 September 1941 | Torpedoed 2:10 a.m., 27 Sep 1941 U-201 (Note: 49°50'N, 21°40'W, sank 7:15 p.m. 32 killed 201 survivors) |
| HMS Duncan | Royal Navy | D-class destroyer leader | 17–20 September 1941 | |
| HMS Highlander | Royal Navy | H-class destroyer | 22–26 September 1941 | |
| HMS Vimy | Royal Navy | V-class destroyer | 17–22 September 1941 | |
| HMS Wild Swan | Royal Navy | W-class destroyer | 20–22 September 1941 | |
| HMS Wolverine | Royal Navy | W-class destroyer | 28 Sept – 1 Oct 1941 | |
| HMS Farndale | Royal Navy | Hunt-class destroyer | 17–20 September 1941 | |
| HMS Fowey | Royal Navy | Shoreham-class sloop | 17–30 September 1941 | |
| HMS Begonia | Royal Navy | Flower-class corvette | 17–30 September 1941 | |
| HMS Gentian | Royal Navy | Flower-class corvette | 17–30 September 1941 | |
| HMS Hibiscus | Royal Navy | Flower-class corvette | 17–30 September 1941 | |
| HMS Jasmine | Royal Navy | Flower-class corvette | 17–30 September 1941 | |
| HMS Larkspur | Royal Navy | Flower-class corvette | 17–30 September 1941 | |
| HMS Myosotis | Royal Navy | Flower-class corvette | 17–30 September 1941 | |
| HMS Periwinkle | Royal Navy | Flower-class corvette | 17–30 September 1941 | |
| HMS Stonecrop | Royal Navy | Flower-class corvette | 17–30 September 1941 | |

=== Axis submarines ===
Axis submarines and Luftwaffe
| Name | Flag | Class | Notes |
|---|---|---|---|
| Leonardo da Vinci | Kingdom of Italy | Marconi-class submarine | BETASOM (acronym of Bordeaux Sommergibili) |
| Alessandro Malaspina | Kingdom of Italy | Marconi-class submarine | BETASOM, sunk 7 September RAAF Sunderland |
| Luigi Torelli | Kingdom of Italy | Marconi-class submarine | BETASOM, damaged night of 21/22 by Vimy |
| Morosini | Kingdom of Italy | Marcello-class submarine | BETASOM |
| U-124 | Kriegsmarine | Type IXB submarine | Sank four ships |
| U-201 | Kriegsmarine | Type VIIC submarine | Sank three ships |
| U-203 | Kriegsmarine | Type VIIC submarine | Sank two ships |
| U-205 | Kriegsmarine | Type VIIC submarine | Damaged by Coastal Command aircraft |
| U-371 | Kriegsmarine | Type VIIC submarine | |

=== Luftwaffe ===
Luftwaffe
| Unit | Flag | Type | Notes |
|---|---|---|---|
| Kampfgeschwader 40 | Luftwaffe | Fw 200 Kondor | Long-range reconnaissance bomber |

== Bibliography ==
- Blair, Clay (1997) [1996]. Hitler's U-boat War: The Hunters 1939–1942. Vol. I. London: Weidenfeld & Nicolson. ISBN 0-297-84076-2.
- Brown, David (1995) [1990]. Warship Losses of World War Two (2nd rev. ed.). London: Arms and Armour Press. ISBN 978-1-85409-278-6.
- Budiansky, Stephen (2013). Blackett's War: The Men Who Defeated the Nazi U-boats and Brought Science to the Art of Warfare (e-book ed.). New York: Alfred A. Knopf. ISBN 978-0-307-96263-8.
- Hague, Arnold (2000). The Allied Convoy System 1939–1945: Its Organisation, Defence and Operation. London: Chatham. ISBN 1-86176-147-3.
- Hinsley, F. H. (1994) [1993]. British Intelligence in the Second World War: Its Influence on Strategy and Operations. History of the Second World War, United Kingdom Military Series (2nd rev. abr. ed.). London: HMSO. ISBN 978-0-11-630961-7.
- Jordan, Roger W. (2006) [1999]. The World's Merchant Fleets 1939: The Particulars and Wartime Fates of 6,000 Ships (2nd ed.). London: Chatham/Lionel Leventhal. ISBN 978-1-86176-293-1.
- Kindell, Don (2024). "HG Convoys: Convoy HG.73". convoyweb.
- Macksey, K. (2004) [2003]. The Searchers: Radio Intercept in two World Wars (Cassell Military Paperbacks ed.). London: Cassell. ISBN 978-0-304-36651-4.
- Kahn, D. (1973) [1967]. The Codebreakers: The Story of Secret Writing (10th abr. Signet, Chicago ed.). New York: Macmillan. LCCN 63-16109. OCLC 78083316.
- Rohwer, Jürgen; Hümmelchen, Gerhard (2005) [1972]. Chronology of the War at Sea, 1939–1945: The Naval History of World War Two (3rd rev. ed.). London: Chatham. ISBN 978-1-86176-257-3.
- Terraine, John (1999) [1989]. Business in Great Waters (Pbk. repr Wordsworth Editions, Ware ed.). London: Leo Cooper. ISBN 1-84022-201-8.
- Winton, John (1988). Ultra at Sea: How Breaking the Nazi code affected Allied Naval Strategy during World War II (e-book ed.). Leeds: Sapere Books. ISBN 978-1-80055-522-8.
- Woodman, Richard (2005) [2004]. The Real Cruel Sea: The Merchant Navy in the Battle of the Atlantic, 1939–1943 (Pbk. ed.). London: John Murray. ISBN 0-7195-6599-5.
