= HMS Larkspur (K82) =

Flower-class corvette

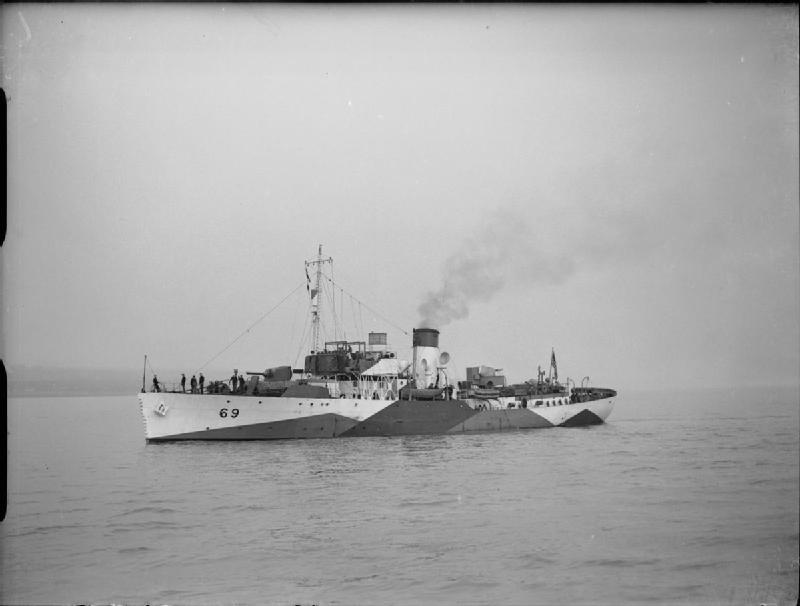
- USS Fury, formerly HMS Larkspur, off Liverpool.

History

United Kingdom
- Name: HMS Larkspur
- Namesake: Larkspur (flower)
- Builder: Fleming & Ferguson, Paisley
- Laid down: 26 March 1940
- Launched: 5 September 1940
- Commissioned: 4 January 1941
- Decommissioned: 15 March 1942
- Identification: Pennant number: K82
- Fate: Transferred to United States Navy

United States
- Name: USS Fury
- Commissioned: 17 March 1942
- Decommissioned: 22 August 1945
- Identification: Hull number: PG-69
- Fate: Returned to Royal Navy

United Kingdom
- Name: HMS Larkspur
- Fate: Sold into civilian service 1947, scrapped 1953

General characteristics
- Class & type: Flower-class corvette
- Displacement: 925 long tons (940 t; 1,036 short tons)
- Length: 205 ft (62.48 m)o/a
- Beam: 33 ft 2 in (10.11 m)
- Draught: 13 ft 7 in (4.14 m)
- Propulsion: single shaft; 2 × fire tube Scotch boilers; 1 × 4-cycle triple-expansion reciprocating steam engine; 2,750 ihp (2,050 kW)
- Speed: 16.5 knots (30.6 km/h)
- Range: 3,500 nautical miles (6,482 km) at 12 knots (22.2 km/h)
- Complement: 85
- Sensors & processing systems: 1 × SW1C or 2C radar; 1 × Type 123A or Type 127DV sonar
- Armament: 1 × 4-inch BL Mk.IX single gun; 2 × .50 cal machine gun (twin); 2 × Lewis .303 cal machine gun (twin); 2 × Mk.II depth charge throwers; 2 × Depth charge rails with 40 depth charges; originally fitted with minesweeping gear, later removed

HMS Larkspur was a Flower-class corvette, built for the Royal Navy during the Second World War, and was in service in the Battle of the Atlantic. In 1942 she was transferred to the United States Navy as part of the Reverse Lend-Lease arrangement and renamed USS Fury, one of the Temptress-class gunboats. With the end of hostilities she was returned to the Royal Navy and sold into mercantile service.

== Design and construction ==
Larkspur was built at Fleming and Ferguson, of Paisley, as part of the 1939 War Emergency building programme. She was laid down on 26 March 1940 and launched 5 September 1940. She was completed and entered service on 4 January 1941, being named for the Larkspur family of garden flowers. While building Larkspur was modified to include the extended forecastle that became a feature of the Flowers, added to improve habitability. She also gained a navy-style open bridge, though she retained the mercantile foremast position forward of the bridge.

== Service history ==
=== Royal Navy ===
After working up, Larkspur was assigned to the Western Approaches Escort Force for service as a convoy escort. In this role she was engaged in all the duties performed by escort ships; protecting convoys, searching for and attacking U-boats which attacked ships in convoy, and rescuing survivors. In 14 months service Larkspur escorted 10 North Atlantic, one South Atlantic and five Gibraltar convoys assisting in the safe passage of over 400 ships.

She was involved in two major convoy battles:: In July 1941 Larkspur was part of the escort for OG 69, which was attacked by a U-boat pack, losing 9 ships sunk. In September 1941 she was with HG 73, which lost nine merchant and one warship sunk.

=== US Navy ===
Following the entry of the United States into the war the US Navy was in need of anti-submarine warfare vessels, and to meet this need a number of ships were transferred from the Royal Navy as part of a reverse Lend-Lease arrangement. Larkspur was commissioned into the USN on 17 March 1942 as USS Fury. After an overhaul Fury was employed as an escort on the East Coast convoy route, and for convoys between New York and the Caribbean. In 1945 Fury was also employed in anti-submarine patrols off the East Coast ports.

In August 1945 she was decommissioned and returned to the Royal Navy.

== Fate ==
Larkspur was stricken in 1946 and sold into commercial service as the merchant ship Larkslock. She was scrapped at Hong Kong in 1953.
