= German submarine U-160 =

U-160 may refer to one of the following German submarines:

- SM U-160, a Type U 93 submarine launched in 1918; served in World War I until surrendered on 20 November 1918; broken up at Cherbourg
- German submarine U-160 (1941), a Type IXC submarine that served in World War II until sunk on 14 July 1943
