= HMCS Skeena =

Several Canadian naval units have been named HMCS Skeena.

- HMCS Skeena (D59) (I) was a River-class destroyer active from 1931–1944.
- HMCS Skeena (DDH 207) (II) was a St. Laurent-class destroyer escort active from 1957–1993.

The 116 Skeena Sea Cadets Corps (RCSCC Skeena) of the Royal Canadian Sea Cadets was named in honour of the first HMCS Skeena in 1941. The cadet unit has artifacts from the ship including the first ship's bell.

== Battle honours ==
- Atlantic 1939–44
- Normandy 1944
- Biscay 1944
