= HMS Springbank =

1926 cargo ship converted to catapult ship

History

United Kingdom
- Name: Springbank
- Owner: Bank Line
- Builder: Harland and Wolff, Govan
- Launched: 13 April 1926
- Fate: Requisitioned by Royal Navy 1939

United Kingdom
- Name: HMS Springbank
- Acquired: 1939
- Fate: Sunk 27 September 1941

General characteristics
- Tonnage: 5,155 GRT
- Length: 420.3 ft (128.1 m)
- Beam: 53.9 ft (16.4 m)
- Draught: 26 ft 6 in (8.08 m)
- Propulsion: 717 nhp, 2 screws
- Armament: 4 × twin 4 in (102 mm) guns; 2 × quad 2 pdr guns
- Aircraft carried: Fairey Fulmar
- Aviation facilities: Single catapult

HMS Springbank was a Royal Navy fighter catapult ship of the Second World War.

== History ==
Originally a cargo ship built in 1926 for Bank Line it was acquired by the Admiralty at the start of the war and converted to an "auxiliary anti-aircraft cruiser" by the addition of four twin 4-inch (102 mm) gun turrets and two quadruple 2 pdr (40 mm) "pom-pom"s.

In March 1941 a catapult for a single Fairey Fulmar naval fighter (from 804 Naval Air Squadron) was fitted midships as a means to give further protection for convoys from enemy aircraft.

Springbank was part of the escort for Convoy HG 73 from Gibraltar to Liverpool. Springbank's Fulmar was launched to drive off a German Focke-Wulf Fw 200 reconnaissance aircraft; the Fulmar landed at Gibraltar afterwards. The convoy was attacked by Italian and German submarines over the following days. In the night of 27 September 1941 Springbank was torpedoed in the North Atlantic by the German submarine U-201. After her surviving crew were taken off by three ships, the ship was sunk by the Flower-class corvette HMS Jasmine by a combination of depth charges and 4-inch gunfire rather than leave her as a hazard to shipping.
