= Wolfpack Delphin II =

Wolf pack Delphin II
- Active: 26 December 1942 - 14 February 1943
- Country: (Nazi Germany) Germany
- Branch: Kriegsmarine
- Size: 17 submarines

Commanders
- Notable commanders: Joachim Berger; Ulrich Folkers; Harald Gelhaus; Günther Heydemann; Günther Krech; Helmut Möhlmann; Günther Seibicke,

Delphin II (Dolphin) was the name given to a wolfpack of German U-boats that operated during the Battle of the Atlantic in World War II, from 26 December 1942 to 14 February 1943.

The group was responsible for sinking 10 merchant ships and damaging one ship; 2 of the pack's U-boats were sunk.

== Raiding history ==
Date	U-boat	Commander	Name of ship	Nationality	Tons	Convoy	Fate
8 January 1943	U-436	Günther Seibicke	Albert L. Ellsworth	Norway	8,309	TM-1	Sunk
8 January 1943	U-436	Günther Seibicke	Oltenia II	United Kingdom	6,394	TM-1	Sunk
9 January 1943	U-522	Herbert Schneider	Minister Wedel	Norway	6,833	TM-1	Sunk
9 January 1943	U-522	Herbert Schneider	Norvik	Panama	10,034	TM-1	Sunk
9 January 1943	U-442	Hans-Joachim Hesse	Empire Lytton	United Kingdom	9,807	TM-1	Sunk
9 January 1943	U-511	Fritz Schneewind	William Wilberforce	United Kingdom	5,004		Sunk
11 January 1943	U-522	Herbert Schneider	British Dominion	United Kingdom	6,983	TM-1	Damaged
11 January 1943	U-620	Heinz Stein	British Dominion	United Kingdom	6,983	TM-1	Sunk
25 January 1943	U-575	Günther Heydemann	City of Flint	United States	4,963	UGS-4	Sunk
27 January 1943	U-442	Hans-Joachim Hesse	Julia Ward Howe	United States	7,176	UGS-4	Sunk
27 January 1943	U-514	Hans-Jürgen Auffermann	Charles C. Pinckney	United States	7,177	UGS-4	Sunk

== U-boats involved ==
U-boat	Commander	From	To	Comment
U-87	Kapitänleutnant Joachim Berger	20 January 1943	9 February 1943	
U-107	Kapitänleutnant Harald Gelhaus	11 February 1943	14 February 1943	
U-125	Kapitänleutnant Ulrich Folkers	5 January 1943	13 February 1943	
U-202	Kapitänleutnant Günter Poser	20 January 1943	9 February 1943	
U-258	Oberleutnant zur See Leopold Koch	23 January 1943	9 February 1943	
U-264	Kapitänleutnant Hartwig Looks	23 January 1943	9 February 1943	
U-381	Kapitänleutnant Wilhelm-Heinrich Graf von Pückler und Limpurg	26 December 1942	14 February 1943	
U-436	Korvettenkapitän Günther Seibicke	26 December 1942	12 February 1943	
U-442	Fregattenkapitän Hans-Joachim Hesse	26 December 1942	12 February 1943	U-boat was sunk
U-463	Korvettenkapitän Leo Wolfbauer	11 January 1943	14 January 1943	
U-511	Kapitänleutnant Fritz Schneewind	3 January 1943	14 February 1943	
U-514	Kapitänleutnant Hans-Jürgen Auffermann	5 January 1943	9 February 1943	
U-522	Kapitänleutnant Herbert Schneider	3 January 1943	14 February 1943	
U-558	Kapitänleutnant Günther Krech	24 January 1943	14 February 1943	
U-571	Korvettenkapitän Helmut Möhlmann	26 December 1942	19 January 1943	
U-575	Kapitänleutnant Günther Heydemann	26 December 1942	14 February 1943	
U-620	Kapitänleutnant Heinz Stein	26 December 1942	13 February 1943	U-boat was sunk
