= Convoy TM 1 =

Convoy during naval battles of the Second World War

- Part of Atlantic Campaign of the Second World War
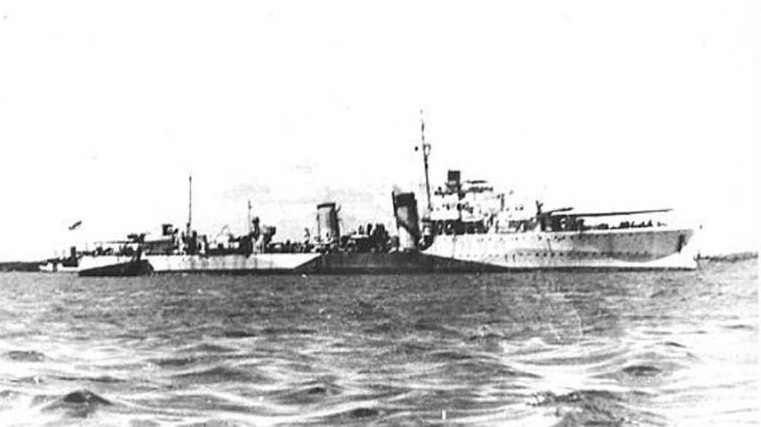
- HMS Havelock in camouflage
Date	28 December 1942 – 14 January 1943
Location	mid-Atlantic Ocean
Result	German victory

Belligerents
Germany	United Kingdom; Belgium

Commanders and leaders
Karl Dönitz	Richard Boyle

Strength
gruppe Delphin; 10 U-boats; 5 other U-boats	1 destroyer; 3 corvettes; 9 tankers

Casualties and losses
2 U-boats damaged	7 tankers sunk

Convoy TM 1 was the name of an Allied convoy during the Second World War. Nine tankers, escorted by Royal Navy warships, sailed from Trinidad in the Caribbean for Gibraltar in the Mediterranean Sea. Apprehension in the British government about a shortage of fuel in Britain and the demands on stocks of the unexpected length of the campaign in Tunisia after Operation Torch (8–16 November 1942) led to the convoy being arranged to supply fuel direct to the Mediterranean.

Escort Group B5, the destroyer HMS Havelock and three Flower-class corvettes, HMS Godetia, Pimpernel and Saxifrage protected the convoy that was attacked for several days during its passage through the Atlantic by a U-boat wolf pack (gruppe Delphin). The small number of escorts suffered failures of radar and high-frequency direction finding (Huff-Duff) sets that inhibited their effectiveness and despite the tanker's speed, the convoy was limited to about 8 kn (15 km/h; 9.2 mph) because of the short range of the corvettes.

The effectiveness of the U-boat attacks were reduced when U-boats left the convoy to attack sinking and drifting ships but seven of the nine tankers were sunk in return for minor damage to two U-boats. A Court of Inquiry was convened in Gibraltar over allegations that the crew of Vanja sent homing signals to the U-boats and avoiding attack but these were dismissed. Complaints of indiscipline amongst the crew of Empire Lytton were upheld and blamed on the Ministry of War Transport for its crewing policy.

== Background ==
=== British oil shortages ===
Map of the Atlantic Ocean

In 1942 1,664 Allied ships of 7,790,697 GRT had been sunk, 1,160 of the ships (6,266,215 GRT) by U-boats. Imports into Britain had been reduced by a third of the peacetime rate to 34,000,000 long tons (35,000,000 t) a year. The Prime Minister, Winston Churchill, formed and chaired a cabinet Anti-U-boat Warfare Committee on 4 November. By the end of the year there were only 300,000 long tons (300,000 t) of bunker fuel in Britain with monthly consumption at 130,000 long tons (130,000 t). The Admiralty had a reserve of 1,000,000 long tons (1,000,000 t) but this was for emergencies.

The unexpected delay in the capture of Tunisia after Operation Torch added to the drain on British fuel stocks as despatches of petroleum products to Tunisia for British forces in the theatre came from Britain. The need to begin convoys in US waters caused delays to taker sailings across the Atlantic and between 1 January and 31 December 1942, 218 tankers were sunk. Exceptionally stormy weather during the autumn and winter of 1942 was particularly damaging to tankers and by the end of the year, 1,700,000 DWT (25 per cent) of the British tanker fleet of 7,600,000 DWT was being repaired or out of service.

Churchill was told by Admiral Sir Dudley Pound, the First Sea Lord "An ample reserve of fuel on this side of the Atlantic is the basis of all our activities". The convoy cycle in the Atlantic was lengthened from eight to ten days and the saving in escorts was diverted to the Caribbean to escort 18 CU–UC tanker convoys from Aruba to Britain on a twenty-day cycle, to deliver 1,200,000 long tons (1,200,000 t) of petrol products in 1943. A new convoy route direct to the Mediterranean, Outward Trinidad (OT) and TO (the reciprocal North Africa to the Caribbean) was organised to limit the drain on stocks of oil in Britain. The OT–TO convoys were to consist only of "Greyhounds" capable of at least 14.5 kn (26.9 km/h; 16.7 mph) and be escorted by modern United States Navy destroyers; other Greyhounds were to sail independently to Britain.

=== U-boats in the Americas ===
Aruba outlined in red

German Type IX and Type VIID minelayers, U-boats operating in American waters had sufficient endurance but were not suitable for convoy attacks or crash-diving to evade aircraft attacks. Admiral Karl Dönitz the Befehlshaber der U-Boote (BdU, commander of U-boats) sent six Type VII U-boats to patrol off Natal in Brazil to attack new Allied convoy routes. The boats sailed from 17 to 22 December as Wolfpack (gruppe) Delphin to rendezvous with U-463 a Milchkuh (milk cow) supply submarine. B-Dienst, the code-breaking branch of the German Naval Intelligence Service, notified Dönitz of a new UGS convoy route to the south of the Azores and gruppe Delphin was diverted to search to the south-west of the Azores. The search found nothing and on 2 January the boats were ordered to refuel from U-463 and resume the voyage to Natal.

== Prelude ==
=== Tankers ===
The convoy consisted of nine fast motor tankers, the British RFA Albert L. Ellsworth, British Dominion, British Vigilance, Cliona, Empire Lytton and Oltenia II, the Norwegian Minister Wedel and Vanja and the Panamanian Norvik.

=== Escort Group B5 ===
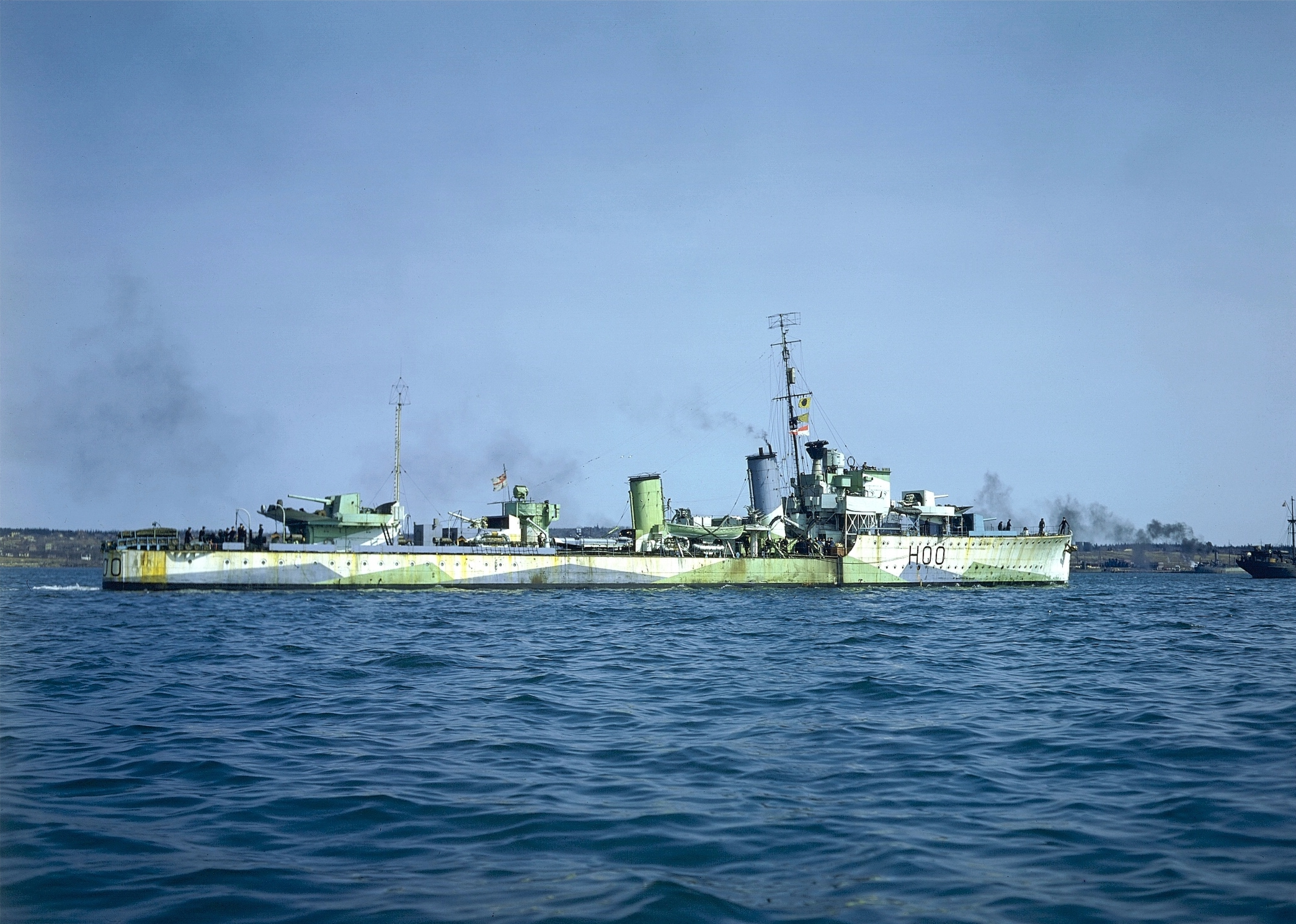
Western Approaches camouflage

Escort Group B5 (Commander Richard Boyle) had been on detachment to the Caribbean for six months and consisted of the H-class destroyer HMS Havelock and the Flower-class corvettes HMS Godetia, Pimpernel and Saxifrage; the group had lost experience in Atlantic convoy operations. The US Eastern Sea Frontier commander had asked for the ships to be painted grey and there was no time to re-paint the ships in Western Approaches Command camouflage. Havelock and Saxifrage carried high-frequency direction finding apparatus (Huff-Duff) but the set on Havelock was unserviceable. The radar on Godetia failed on 2 January 1943 and after 8 January the set on Pimpernel lost efficiency.

=== 28−31 December ===
Standard convoy sailing order
column 1	column 2	column 3
11 Ship	21 Ship	31 Ship
12 Ship	22 Ship	32 ship

Larger convoys added columns, keeping a rectangular shape. The convoy sailed from Port of Spain, Trinidad on 28 December for Gibraltar but without Godetia that was escorting two tankers that were catching up with the convoy. (Note: Convoys had a standard formation of short columns, number 1 to the left in the direction of travel. Each position in the column was numbered; 11 was the first ship in column 1 and 12 was the second ship in the column; 21 was the first ship in column 2.) The convoy was escorted by a Catalina flying boat and early on 29 December, the crew reported a surfaced U-boat (U-124) about 20 nmi (37 km; 23 mi) behind the convoy. The Catalina attacked the U-boat with depth-charges and mousetrap bombs, forcing it to dive. Godetia conducted a search as it closed on the convoy, to no avail. The tankers were fast but eking out the fuel of the corvettes in the escort limited its speed to around 8 kn (15 km/h; 9.2 mph), reduced further by headwinds and a contrary ocean current.

=== 1−3 January ===
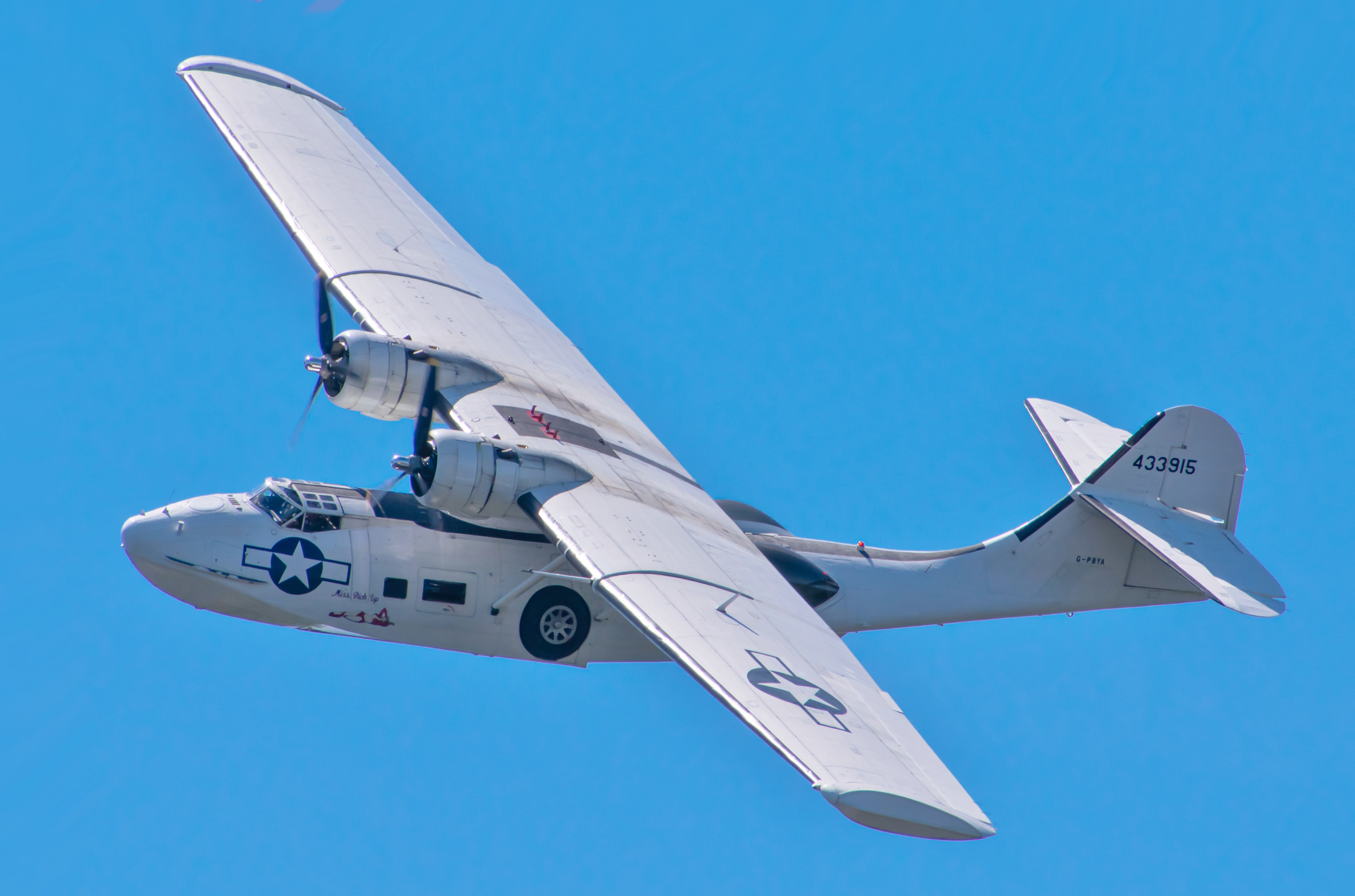
Catalina flying boat

Attempts to refuel by the escorts were hampered by lack of training and poor equipment but Cliona managed to pass some fuel across to the escorts. After the first U-boat sighting, all was quiet for three days; during the afternoon of 3 January, when Convoy TM 1 was about 1,050 nmi (1,940 km; 1,210 mi) east of Trinidad, the convoy received a signal from the Admiralty that another U-boat was nearby and later on, the US Eastern Sea Frontier commander ordered a course change to just north of east. As night fell, a U-boat was spotted at long range and at 9:35 p.m. Havelock received an Asdic contact 3 nmi (5.6 km; 3.5 mi) in front of the convoy.

== Battle ==
=== 3–7 January ===
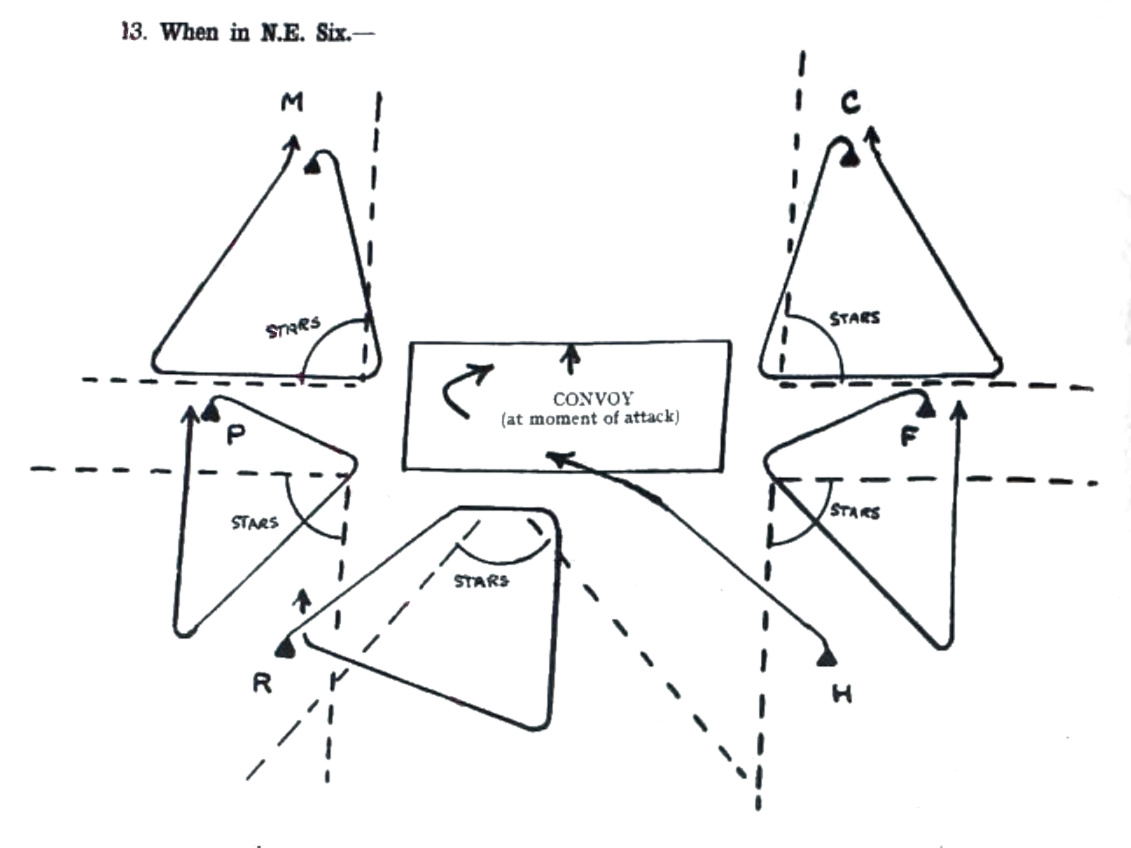
Example of a Raspberry manoeuvre by convoy escorts

On 3 January, having received an Asdic contact, Havelock accelerated towards a U-boat but then another one was detected by radar. At 9:46 p.m. the officer of the watch in British Vigilance spotted the outline of a U-boat ahead and then a torpedo hit the ship and its cargo of 11,000 long tons (11,000 t) of petroleum caught fire, illuminating U-514 as it passed the ship down its port side. Every gun in the tankers that could bear opened fire on the U-boat, Empire Lytton, the second ship in the third column, tried to ram U-514 and claimed around 200 hits with its two 20 mm Oerlikon guns at 200–300 yd (180–270 m) before the U-boat went out of sight; the crew of the 4-inch gun on Oltenia II claimed a near-miss.

Boyle ordered a Raspberry manoeuvre but only Pimpernel sighted anything, a disturbance in the water on the starboard side of the convoy that might have been from a submerging U-boat. Captain Evan Evans, the skipper of British Vigilance ordered abandon ship, he and 26 survivors went over the side and were picked up by Saxifrage. The other 27 crew were left on the wreck that drifted behind the convoy and burned out; three weeks later the hulk was sunk by U-105. The Huff-Duff set on Havelock was repaired and the escorts managed to take on fuel on 5 January, enabling several offensive sweeps but nothing was found until late evening of 8 January.

=== 8/9 January ===
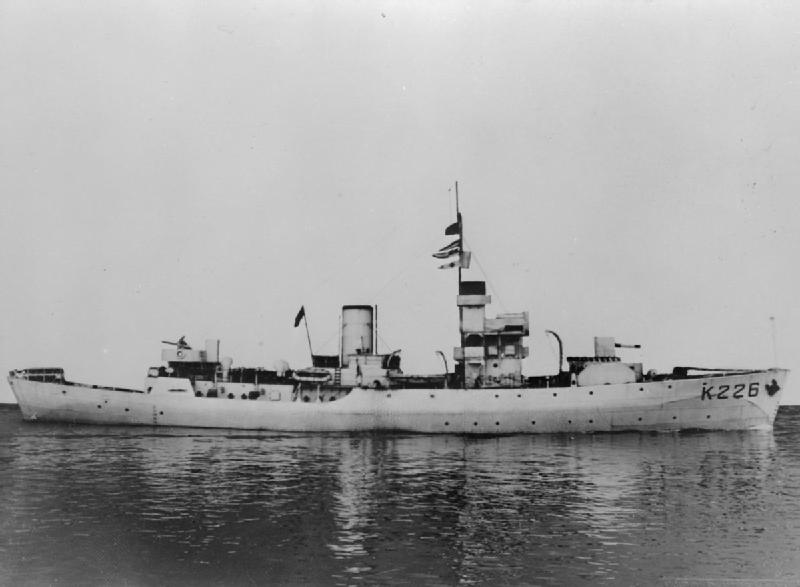
Photograph of HMS Godetia

U-381 made contact with the convoy on 8 January and the five other U-boats of gruppe Delphin closed on the convoy. Dönitz diverted U-511 and U-522, outbound type IX boats of gruppe Seehund. U-128 and U-134, returning from patrols the South Atlantic and U-181 a long-range Type IXD2 submarine returning from the Indian Ocean were directed to attack the convoy. The orders from Dönitz sent five Type IX, seven Type VII and a U-cruiser into the attack on the convoy but U-125, U-128 and U-514 were too far from the convoy to catch up. At 9:35 p.m. Havelock was ahead of the convoy and off to port; a radar contact was obtained between it and the convoy. Havelock attacked at full speed, spotted a U-boat on the surface and attempted to ram but the U-boat submerged. An Asdic contact was picked up and five depth-charges were dropped.

Explosions occurred in the convoy as Albert L. Ellsworth in position 1:1 (first ship, first column) and Oltenia II in position 6:1 (first ship, sixth column) were hit by torpedoes from U-436, Oltenia II exploding. As Albert L. Ellsworth dropped astern, blazing, the other ships nearby dodged round it and the crew abandoned the ship. Boyle got a radar contact at 1,000 yd (910 m) and fired star shell that illuminated a U-boat as it dived; at 9:47 p.m. an asdic contact led to a 14 depth-charge pattern being dropped, followed by another five at 10:10 p.m. before an underwater explosion was heard and contact was lost. Searching behind the convoy, Havelock found only the bodies of merchant sailors. Saxifrage kept watch as Havelock rescued 43 men from Oltenia II and all hands from Albert L. Ellsworth then returned to the convoy. The convoy commodore, Captain Laddle and 16 men of Oltenia II were killed and J. D. Miller of British Dominion became the new convoy commodore. Pimpernel spotted another U-boat on the starboard quarter (120° and 180° to starboard) of the convoy and attacked with its 4-inch gun then dropped ten depth-charges at 10:33 p.m. and the Asdic crew heard the sound of an underwater explosion. By 2:00 a.m. the escorts were back in position.

=== 9 January ===
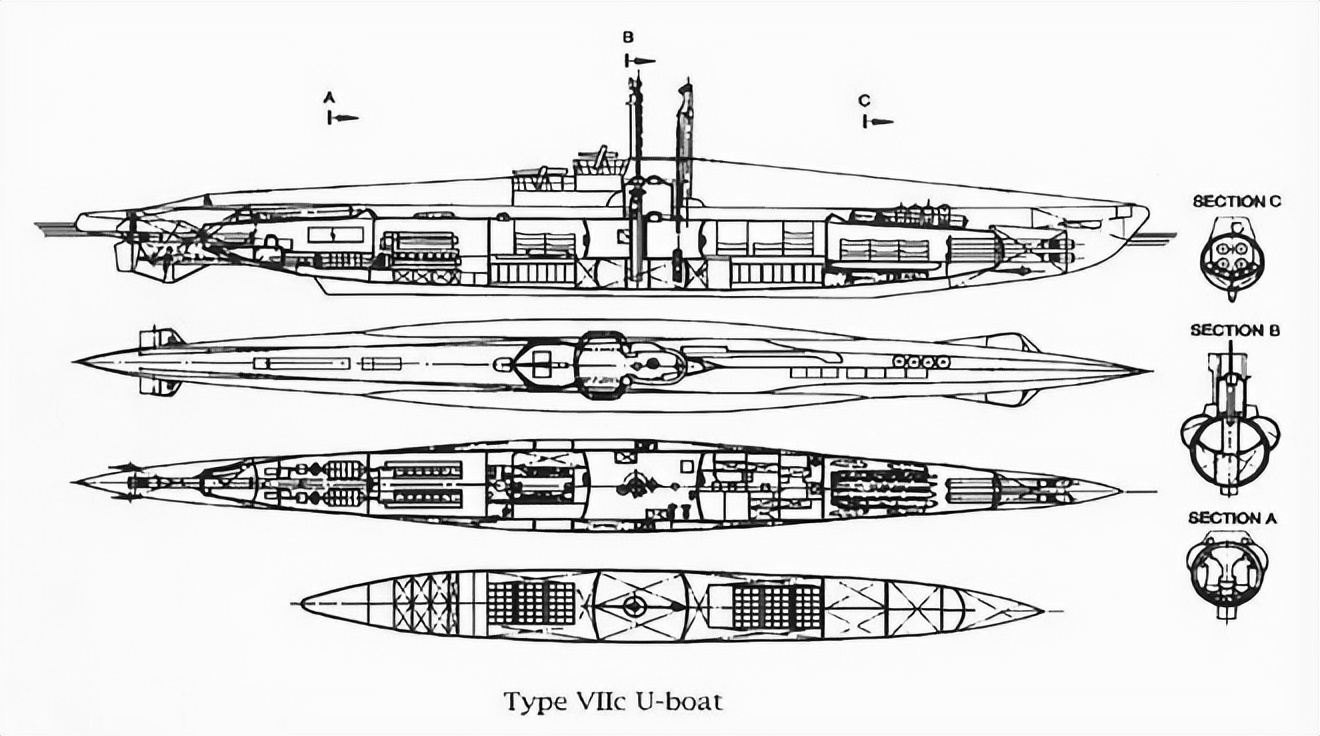
Diagram of a Type VIIC U-boat

Around 5:15 a.m. U-575 hit Minister Wedel in position 9:1 and then Norvik in position 7:2, setting both alight. Havelock and Saxifrage turned round and U-575 was depth-charged by both and another underwater explosion was heard; Havelock lurked close to the tankers to ambush a U-boat if it tried to finish off the tankers. At the same time, as the convoy steered east-north-east at 9 kn (17 km/h; 10 mph), Pimpernel and Godetia attacked Asdic contacts on the port side of the convoy. U-442 managed to hit Empire Lytton but the torpedo passed through the ship 7 ft (2.1 m) from the bows and took off the top of No. 1 tank.

The tank was loaded with heavy oil which spilled over the front of the ship, coating the lifeboat launching rails before falling onto the sea and catching fire. The fumes knocked out the chief officer A. J. de Baughn; the captain, J. W. Andrews, ordered the ship abandoned, using the lifeboats at the rear. Many of the crew tried to save themselves in by launching the port lifeboat before the ship stopped moving and the boat smashed open, the crew going into the water and fuel oil. Andrews picked up 10 survivors and de Baughn, who showed little sign of life; another 10–12 men could be seen in the water. Havelock left its ambush and depth-charged an Asdic echo then returned to find Norvik sinking; the captain of Minister Wedel wanted to save the ship but with reports of 6–7 U-boats nearby, Boyle decided to scuttle both ships. Saxifrage rescued 33 men from Empire Lytton and put Baughn onto Havelock, only for the ship's doctor to find him dead.

=== 9 January (afternoon−evening) ===
At 2:30 p.m. Vanja dodged a torpedo and gunners on British Dominion fired on a periscope. Godetia was able to prevent U-boats persisting with attacks and by 3:30 p.m. they had drawn off to wait for dark, the convoy now reduced to British Dominion, Cliona and Vanja. U-620, following the convoy during the evening of 9 January sank the wrecks of Norvik and Minister Wedel. U-442 finished off Empire Lytton and U-436 sank Albert L. Ellsworth with shells from the deck gun. U-511 sank William Wilberforce, a merchant ship sailing independently. During the night, Havelock and Saxifrage gained Huff-Duff contacts in front and behind the convoy but there were no attacks by the time dawn broke. The Admiralty Tracking Room reported (mistakenly) that only one U-boat was still in contact with the convoy, four more were within 90 nmi (170 km; 100 mi) and 4–5 were within 150 nmi (280 km; 170 mi).

=== 10 January ===
Location map of Madeira (and Portugal)

During 10 January, a sunny day, the convoy steered north-east towards Madeira and morale in the remnants of the convoy rose. During the night a diversion to a course of east-south-east was made but Saxifrage attacked a contact on the starboard quarter at 7:23 p.m. and dropped a ten depth-charge pattern and then after another 20 minutes returned to its station. At 11:30 p.m. the convoy resumed its course to the north-east. At 11:41 p.m. British Dominion was hit on its port side by three torpedoes from U-522, its 9,000 long tons (9,100 t) of aviation fuel caught fire and lit up the vicinity, exposing the U-boat between British Dominion and Vanja. British Dominion suffered 37 men killed.

The captain, J. D. Miller got 15 of the crew away in a lifeboat, to be picked up by Godetia. Vanja swerved to the left and its gunners opened fire with the 4-inch gun and machine-guns but U-522 escaped. Boyle ordered a Raspberry and as the escorts turned and fired star shell, three U-boats were spotted in a few minutes. Lookouts on Havelock, Saxifrage and Pimpernel saw U-522 that dived at 11:43 p.m. and Godetia attacked another U-boat that dived out of the way. Havelock attacked the third U-boat that was tracked by Asdic and depth-charged. The U-boat was heard blowing its tanks and then a big explosion was heard, more depth-charges were dropped but around 00:39 a.m. contact was lost.

=== 11−14 January ===
The destroyer HMAS Quiberon arrived during the morning and Catalina escort accompanied the convoy, later on two Flower-class corvettes, HMS Pentstemon and Samphire, joined but there were only two tankers left to escort into Gibraltar, arriving on 14 January. (Note: In Woodman's account the later escorts to arrive were destroyers, HMS Penn and Pathfinder.) On 24 January, the hulk of British Vigilance, torpedoed by U-514 on 3 January, was discovered by U-105 and sunk.

== Aftermath ==
=== Analysis ===
Clay Blair wrote in 2000 that it was hard for the BdU to assess the result of the operation against Convoy TM 1 but the U-boats had claimed hits on 25 ships, 15 having been sunk. Despite obvious over-claiming when U-boats had fired at the same ships Dönitz allowed the claims. Admiral Erich Raeder sent congratulations to Dönitz and the crews of gruppe Delphin. The propaganda machine claimed 15 ships of 142,000 long tons (144,000 t) against seven tankers of nine being sunk for 56,453 long tons (57,359 t) that with the addition of William Wilberforce came to 61,457 long tons (62,443 t). The attack on Convoy TM 1 led to substantial changes in the December U-boat deployment plan. None of the U-boats intended for the Americas arrived; the patrol of gruppe Delphin to Natal was cancelled along with two U-boats intended for the West Indies. U-511 and U-522 had fired so many torpedoes and used so much fuel that they could not operate with gruppe Seehund due for Cape Town and the Indian Ocean. Gruppe Delphin with the four Type IX boats that had participated, U-125, U-511, U-514 and U-522 and five Type VII U-boats that sailed in January stayed near the Azores, taking the place of the defunct gruppe Westwall.

In 2004, Richard Woodman wrote that the conduct of Convoy TM 1 had been a disaster. The Germans thought that they inflicted fewer losses than was the case, claiming 15 tankers. In 1989 G. Hessler wrote that "The convoy escort...was unpractised and lacked perseverance". At the same time,

Preoccupation with torpedoed tankers and enemy depth-charge attacks soon caused many...to drop astern, so that after the second day only four boats were still in touch, and the pursuit was abandoned on the [sic] 11 January near Madeira.

The four drifting wrecks were sunk but none of the U-boats that sank tankers lasted long and this has been used to criticise Boyle and his escorts but this did not take account of the weakness of the escort and the trouble that RN crews were still having in refuelling at sea.

==== Court of Inquiry ====
The Admiralty put Captain W. G. Parry of HMS Renown in charge of an inquiry. The tanker Vanja had allegedly given cause for suspicion with poor station keeping and for being distant from ships that were torpedoed. The wireless operator in British Dominion claimed that he had heard homing signals on 500 kHz, supposedly from Vanja and an officer on Narvik mentioned a rumour that his wireless operator had also heard the signals. The implications of the allegations for a crew of Norwegian emigrés, was difficult to contemplate. The suspicions were confounded by the captain of Cliona who explained that Vanja was suffering from engine-trouble due to a cracked cylinder. Allegations of indiscipline on Empire Lytton were considered, whose captain, J. W. Andrews gave evidence that "he had never sailed with such a bad crew. Their behaviour when torpedoed was disgusting...". The Ministry of War Transport was blamed for crewing vessels from a common pool, denying captains a choice of men. Parry concluded that Vanja had trouble station keeping because of the engine-trouble and that the insubordinate crew of Empire Lytton could not be blamed on the captain and officers. The inquiry blamed the inadequate number of escorts, made worse by the radar sets failing in Godetia and Pimpernel.

== Order of battle ==
=== Convoy TM 1 ===
Convoy TM 1, Trinidad to Gibraltar
Name	Year	Flag	GRT	Notes
Convoy TM 1
RFA Albert L. Ellsworth	1937	Royal Fleet Auxiliary	8,309	8 January, U-436, 27°59′N, 28°50′W, 9 January sunk 0†, 42 surv.
MV British Dominion	1928	United Kingdom	6,983	11 January, U-522, 30°30′N, 19°55′W, sunk U-620 38†, 15 surv.
MV British Vigilance	1942	United Kingdom	8,903	Capt E. O. Evans, vice-commodore, 3 January, U-514 27†, 27 surv. (Note: 24 January hulk sunk by U-105)
MV Cliona	1931	United Kingdom	8,375	
MV Empire Lytton	1942	United Kingdom	9,807	9 January, U-442, sunk, 28°08′N, 28°20′W 14†, 34 surv.
MV Minister Wedel	1930	Norway	6,833	9 January, U-522 sunk, 28°18′N, 27°20′W 0†, 38 surv.
MV Norvik	1938	Panama	9,555	9 January, U-522, sunk U-575, 28°08′N, 28°20′W, 2†, 43 surv.
MV Oltenia II	1928	United Kingdom	6,394	8 January, U-436, sunk, 27°59′N, 28°50′W, 17†, 43 surv.
MV Vanja	1929	Norway	6,198	
Independent sailing
MV William Wilberforce	1930	United Kingdom	4,013	9 January, sunk, U-511 29°20′N, 26°53′W, 3† 60 surv.

=== Escorts ===
Escorts for Convoy TM 1
Name	Flag	Type	Notes
Escorts
HMS Havelock	Royal Navy	H-class destroyer	28 December – 14 January
HMS Godetia	Belgian Navy (Note: Royal Navy Belgian Section)	Flower-class corvette	28 December – 14 January
HMS Pimpernel	Royal Navy	Flower-class corvette	28 December – 14 January
HMS Saxifrage	Royal Navy	Flower-class corvette	28 December – 14 January
Reinforcements
HMAS Quiberon	Royal Navy	Q-class destroyer	12–14 January
HMS Pentstemon	Royal Navy	Flower-class corvette	12–14 January
HMS Samphire	Royal Navy	Flower-class corvette	12–14 January

=== Air support ===
Patrol Wing-11
Sqn	Flag	Type	No.	Notes
VP-53	United States Navy	Catalina	1	Based at NAS Trinidad, 29 December, attacked U-124

=== U-boats ===
==== Gruppe Delphin ====
U-boats operating against Convoy TM 1
Name	Flag	Commander	Type	Notes
Attack U-boats
U-134	Kriegsmarine	Rudolf Schendel	Type VIIC	Damaged by Godetia
U-381	Kriegsmarine	Wilhelm-Heinrich Pückler und Limpurg	Type VIIC	Damaged by Havelock
U-436	Kriegsmarine	Günther Seibicke	Type VIIC	2 ships sunk
U-442	Kriegsmarine	Hans-Joachim Hesse	Type VIIC	1 ship sunk
U-511	Kriegsmarine	Fritz Schneewind	Type VIIC	Sank the independent William Wilberforce
U-571	Kriegsmarine	Helmut Möhlmann	Type VIIC	
U-575	Kriegsmarine	Günther Heydemann	Type VIIC	
U-620	Kriegsmarine	Heinz Stein	Type VIIC	1 ship sunk
U-181	Kriegsmarine	Wolfgang Lüth	Type IXD2	
U-522	Kriegsmarine	Herbert Schneider	Type IXC	Sank 2 ships, damaged British Dominion
Milchkuh (supply) U-boat
U-463	Kriegsmarine	Leo Wolfbauer	Type XIV	Supply boat for Gruppe Delphin

==== U-boat reinforcements ====
Other U-boats operating against Convoy TM 1
Name	Flag	Type	Commander	Notes
U-124	Kriegsmarine	Type IXB	Johann Mohr	29 December, sighted convoy
U-105	Kriegsmarine	Type IXC	Jürgen Nissen	24 January, sank hulk of British Vigilance
U-125	Kriegsmarine	Type IXC	Ulrich Folkers	Too distant to intervene
U-128	Kriegsmarine	Type IXC	Ulrich Heyse	Too distant to intervene
U-514	Kriegsmarine	Type IXC	Hans-Jürgen Auffermann	Too distant to intervene
