= K226 =

K226 or K-226 may refer to:

- K-226 (Kansas highway), a former state highway in Kansas
- HMS Godetia (K226), a former UK Royal Navy ship
