= SS Port Nicholson =

Two ships of the Commonwealth and Dominion Line, later the Port Line, have been named SS Port Nicholson, the former name of Wellington Harbour:

- SS Port Nicholson (1912) was a cargo ship built in 1912 as Makarini, acquired by Commonwealth and Dominion in 1914, renamed Port Nicholson in 1916 and sunk by a mine in 1917.
- SS Port Nicholson (1918), a cargo ship of Commonwealth and Dominion Line, launched in 1918 and torpedoed and sunk in 1942.

== See also ==
- MV Port Nicholson, a cargo ship of the Port Line, built in 1962 and scrapped in 1979.
