= SS Empire Bell =

World War II merchant ship of the United Kingdom

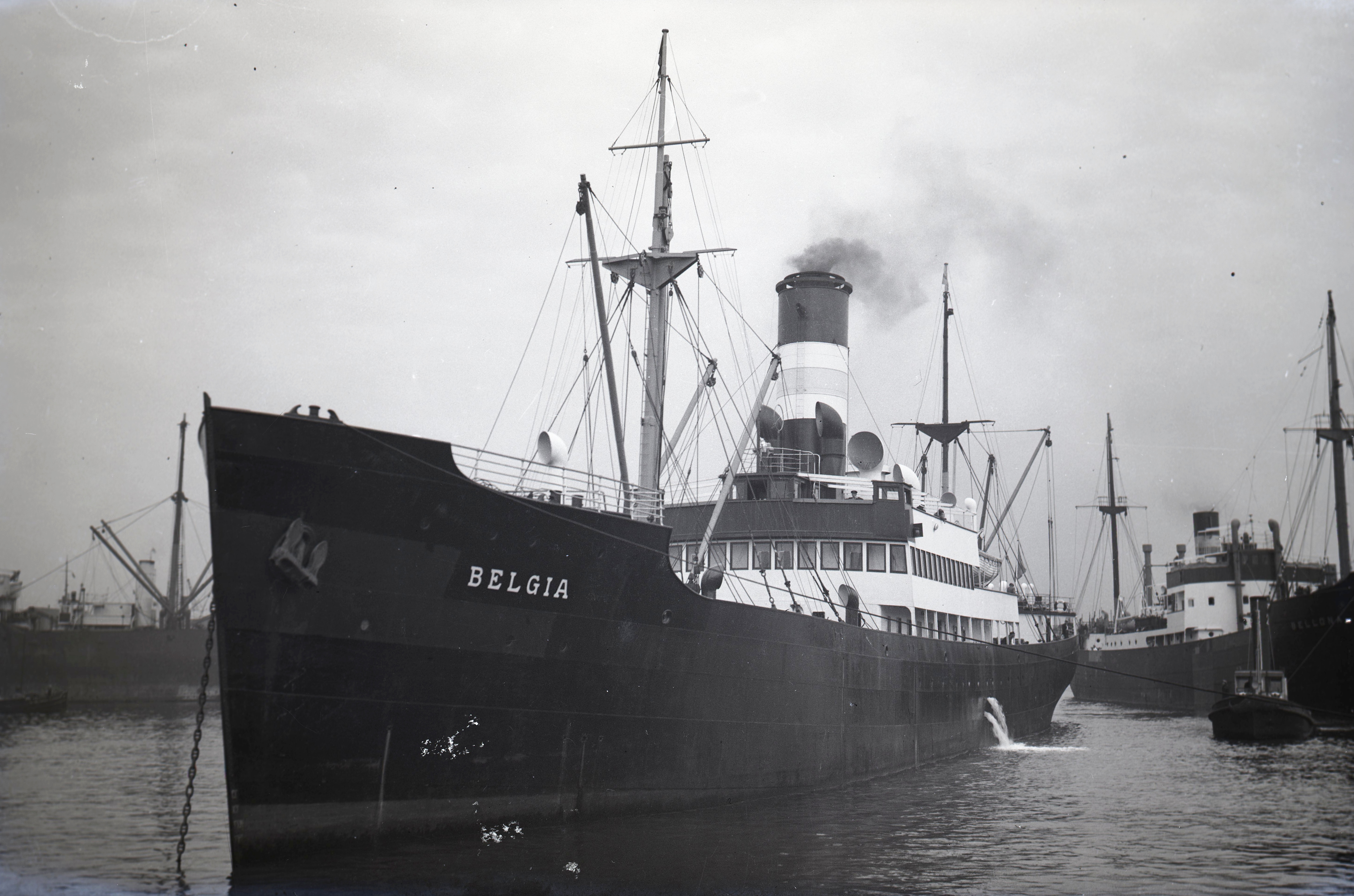
- As Belgia in Antwerp

History
- Name: Belgia (1930–41); Empire Bell (1941–42)
- Owner: Förnyade Ångfartygs Aktiebolag Götha (1930–41); Ministry of War Transport (1941–42)
- Operator: F Sternhagen - "Gotha Line" (1930–41); James Westroll Ltd, Sunderland (1941–42)
- Port of registry: (Sweden) Gothenborg (1930–41); (United Kingdom) South Shields (1940–41)
- Builder: Öresundsvarvet, Landskrona
- Yard number: 28
- Launched: 11 January 1930
- Completed: 7 May 1930
- In service: 13 May 1930
- Out of service: 25 September 1942
- Identification: Swedish Official Number 7636 (1930–41); UK Official Number 168654 (1940–41); Code Letters KHDP (1930–34); Code Letters SHTN (1934–40); Code Letters BDSW (1941–42)
- Fate: Torpedoed and sunk 25 September 1942

General characteristics
- Tonnage: 2,023 GRT, 1,074 NRT (1930–40); 1,744 GRT, 921 NRT (1940–42)
- Length: 286 ft 2 in (87.22 m)
- Beam: 40 ft 2 in (12.24 m)
- Depth: 28 ft 4 in (8.64 m)
- Propulsion: One compound steam engine, 124 hp (92 kW)
- Crew: 31, plus 6 DEMS gunners

Location of the sinking of Empire Bell

Empire Bell was a 1,744 GRT collier which was built by Öresundsvarvet, Landskrona, Sweden as the 2,023 GRT passenger ship Belgia in 1930. In 1940, she was rebuilt as a cargo ship. In 1941, she was damaged by enemy bombing and burnt out. She was salvaged and sold to the Ministry of War Transport (MoWT), repaired and renamed Empire Bell. She was torpedoed and sunk by U-442 on 25 September 1942.

== Description ==
Belgia was built by Öresundsvarvet, Landskrona. She was yard number 28 and was launched on 11 January 1930 with completion on 7 May. She was 286 feet 6 inches (87.33 m) long, with a beam of 40 feet 2 inches (12.24 m) and a depth of 28 feet 4 inches (8.64 m). Her GRT was 2,023, with a NRT of 1,074. She was originally built as a passenger ship.

== Career ==
Belgia was owned by Förnyade Ångfartygs Aktiebolag Götha. She was managed by F Sternberg, Gothenborg, trading as the Gotha Line. Her port of registry was Gothenborg. Belgia was employed on the Gothenborg - Antwerp route. In 1940, she was withdrawn from service and converted to a cargo ship, or collier. The rebuilt ship was 1,744 GRT. During the Second World War, Belgia was a member of a number of convoys.

HN 23B / HN 25

Convoy HN 23B departed from Norway on 31 March 1940 and arrived at Methil, Fife on 4 April. Belgia was carrying general cargo and was bound for Rouen, France. Belgia may have been a member of this convoy, or of Convoy HN 25, which departed Bergen, Norway on 7 April and arrived at Methil on 12 April.

HG 41

Convoy HG 41 departed from Gibraltar on 11 August 1940 and arrived at Liverpool on 25 August. Belgia was carrying a cargo of iron pyrites from Huelva, Spain and was bound for Ardrossan, Ayrshire, arriving on 26 August.

On 26 January 1941, Belgia was bombed by German aircraft and set on fire. At the time she was in the Thames Estuary. Six crew were killed in the attack. On 14 February she was salvaged and towed to Harwich, Essex. Her owners sold her to the MoWT who had her repaired and she was renamed Empire Bell. She was placed under the management of James Westroll Ltd and her port of registry was changed to South Shields. Empire Bell was a member of a number of convoys.

RU 29

Convoy RU 29 departed Reykjavík, Iceland on 25 June 1942 and arrived at Loch Ewe on 29 June. Empire Bell was carrying a cargo of vehicles with a destination of Hull.

UW 42

Convoy UR 42 departed Loch Ewe on 22 September 1942 and arrived at Reykjavík on 27 September. At 16:16 German time (15:16 British Double Summer Time) Empire Bell was torpedoed and sunk by U-442 at 62°19′N 15°27′W with the loss of ten of her 41 crew. The survivors were picked up by SS Lysaker IV and landed at Reykjavík. Those lost on Empire Bell are commemorated at the Tower Hill Memorial, London.

== Official Numbers and Code Letters ==
Official Numbers were a forerunner to IMO Numbers. Belgia had the Swedish Official Number 7636 and the Code Letters KHDP. In 1934, her Code Letters were changed to SHTN. Empire Bell had the UK Official Number 168654 and the Code Letters BDSW.

== Propulsion ==
The ship was propelled by a compound steam engine which had four cylinders, two of 16 9/16 inches (421 mm) diameter and two of 35 7/16 inches (900 mm) by 35 7/16 inches (900 mm) stroke. The engine was built by Aktiebolag Lindholmen-Motala.
