= German submarine U-442 =

German World War II submarine

History

Nazi Germany
- Name: U-442
- Ordered: 5 January 1940
- Builder: Schichau-Werke, Danzig
- Yard number: 1493
- Laid down: 19 October 1940
- Launched: 17 January 1942
- Commissioned: 21 March 1942
- Fate: Sunk on 12 February 1943

General characteristics
- Class & type: Type VIIC submarine
- Displacement: 769 tonnes (757 long tons) surfaced; 871 t (857 long tons) submerged
- Length: 67.10 m (220 ft 2 in) o/a; 50.50 m (165 ft 8 in) pressure hull
- Beam: 6.20 m (20 ft 4 in) o/a; 4.70 m (15 ft 5 in) pressure hull
- Height: 9.60 m (31 ft 6 in)
- Draught: 4.74 m (15 ft 7 in)
- Installed power: 2,800–3,200 PS (2,100–2,400 kW; 2,800–3,200 bhp) (diesels); 750 PS (550 kW; 740 shp) (electric)
- Propulsion: 2 shafts; 2 × diesel engines; 2 × electric motors
- Speed: 17.7 knots (32.8 km/h; 20.4 mph) surfaced; 7.6 knots (14.1 km/h; 8.7 mph) submerged
- Range: 8,500 nmi (15,700 km; 9,800 mi) at 10 knots (19 km/h; 12 mph) surfaced; 80 nmi (150 km; 92 mi) at 4 knots (7.4 km/h; 4.6 mph) submerged
- Test depth: 230 m (750 ft); Crush depth: 250–295 m (820–968 ft)
- Complement: 4 officers, 40–56 enlisted
- Armament: 5 × 53.3 cm (21 in) torpedo tubes (four bow, one stern); 14 × torpedoes; 1 × 8.8 cm (3.46 in) deck gun (220 rounds); 1 x 2 cm (0.79 in) C/30 AA gun

Service record
- Part of: 5th U-boat Flotilla; 21 March – 30 September 1942; 7th U-boat Flotilla; 1 October 1942 – 12 February 1943
- Identification codes: M 41 243
- Commanders: F.Kapt. Hans-Joachim Hesse; 21 March 1942 – 12 February 1943
- Operations: 2 patrols: 1st patrol: 17 September – 16 November 1942; 2nd patrol: 20 December 1942 – 12 February 1943
- Victories: 4 merchant ships sunk (25,417 GRT)

German submarine U-442 was a Type VIIC U-boat of Nazi Germany's Kriegsmarine during World War II.

The submarine was laid down on 19 October 1940 at the Schichau-Werke in Danzig as yard number 1493, launched on 17 January 1942, and commissioned on 21 March 1942 under the command of Fregattenkapitän Hans-Joachim Hesse.

U-442 first served with the 5th U-boat Flotilla, a training unit, and then operationally with the 7th flotilla from 1 October 1942 until the time of her loss.

== Design ==
German Type VIIC submarines were preceded by the shorter Type VIIB submarines. U-442 had a displacement of 769 tonnes (757 long tons) when at the surface and 871 tonnes (857 long tons) while submerged. She had a total length of 67.10 m (220 ft 2 in), a pressure hull length of 50.50 m (165 ft 8 in), a beam of 6.20 m (20 ft 4 in), a height of 9.60 m (31 ft 6 in), and a draught of 4.74 m (15 ft 7 in). The submarine was powered by two Germaniawerft F46 four-stroke, six-cylinder supercharged diesel engines producing a total of 2,800 to 3,200 metric horsepower (2,060 to 2,350 kW; 2,760 to 3,160 shp) for use while surfaced, two AEG GU 460/8–27 double-acting electric motors producing a total of 750 metric horsepower (550 kW; 740 shp) for use while submerged. She had two shafts and two 1.23 m (4 ft) propellers. The boat was capable of operating at depths of up to 230 metres (750 ft).

The submarine had a maximum surface speed of 17.7 knots (32.8 km/h; 20.4 mph) and a maximum submerged speed of 7.6 knots (14.1 km/h; 8.7 mph). When submerged, the boat could operate for 80 nautical miles (150 km; 92 mi) at 4 knots (7.4 km/h; 4.6 mph); when surfaced, she could travel 8,500 nautical miles (15,700 km; 9,800 mi) at 10 knots (19 km/h; 12 mph). U-442 was fitted with five 53.3 cm (21 in) torpedo tubes (four fitted at the bow and one at the stern), fourteen torpedoes, one 8.8 cm (3.46 in) SK C/35 naval gun, 220 rounds, and a 2 cm (0.79 in) C/30 anti-aircraft gun. The boat had a complement of between forty-four and sixty.

== Service history ==
=== First patrol ===
U-442 departed Kiel on 17 September 1942 for her first operational war patrol. Heading via the North Sea toward the north-central Atlantic Ocean, she was near Iceland when convoy UR-42 was sighted. At 16.16 hours on 25 September, U-442 torpedoed and sank her first target, the 1,744 GRT British steam merchant ship Empire Bell. Ten of Empire Bell's 37 crew died in the attack, the survivors were picked up by the Norwegian merchantman Lysaker IV and landed at Reykjavík. Over a month would pass before U-442 crossed paths with the second and final target of this patrol, the 6,690 GRT British ammunition ship Hatimura. Already on fire and slowly sinking from an attack three hours earlier (delivered by U-132), the hit resulted in a catastrophic explosion which threw debris in a large radius around the ship. It is believed U-132 was still nearby and was sunk as a result of this detonation. The patrol was terminated at St. Nazaire in occupied France on 16 November 1942.

=== Second patrol ===
Her second patrol began 20 December 1942, when she sortied from St. Nazaire bound for the central Atlantic via the Bay of Biscay. On the morning of 9 January 1943, U-442 attacked convoy TM 1 west of the Canary Islands, claiming hits on two tankers. In reality only one was hit, the 9,807 GRT steam tanker SS Empire Lytton. Fourteen men were lost in this attack. The remaining 34 men abandoned ship and were picked up by HMS Havelock and Saxifrage. The escorts attempted to scuttle the British tanker with gunfire before breaking off their efforts and heading for Gibraltar to land the survivors. Seven hours later (14.50 hours), the burning, drifting tanker was located again by U-442, which torpedoed her a second time; still she would not go down. Finally, a third torpedo at 19.38 hours sent the tanker to the bottom.

On 27 January 1943 U-442 attacked the 7,176 GRT American Liberty Ship Julia Ward Howe, a straggler from convoy UGS-4. The first torpedo hit on the starboard side, blowing off a hatch cover, wrecking two lifeboats and destroying the radio equipment. The ship immediately took on a 15-degree list but flooded slowly, gradually righting herself to an even keel. Three shots were fired from the merchantman's defensive 5-inch gun, but no hits were scored. Three men, including the ship's master, died in the attack; seventy-one abandoned ship. One more (the chief engineer), subsequently died of his wounds. Forty minutes after the initial attack, a torpedo struck amidships and broke the ship in two. The submarine then surfaced and took the second mate on board for questioning, releasing him afterward. As the U-boat departed the area, the rafts were secured together and steered toward the Azores. Fifteen hours later, they were rescued by the Portuguese destroyer Lima and landed at Ponta Delgada.

=== Loss ===
U-442 met her end on 12 February 1943. She was attacked and sunk by 3 depth charges from British Hudson 'F' aircraft of 48 Squadron RAF, piloted by Flying Officer G.R. Mayhew, west of Cape St. Vincent, Portugal. She was sighted on the surface and attacked from astern. Her wreck lies at position 37°32′N 11°56′W.

=== Wolfpacks ===
U-442 took part in five wolfpacks, namely:

- Luchs (27 September – 6 October 1942)
- Panther (6 – 12 October 1942)
- Leopard (12 – 19 October 1942)
- Veilchen (27 October – 4 November 1942)
- Delphin (26 December 1942 – 12 February 1943)

== Summary of raiding history ==
Date	Ship Name	Nationality	Tonnage (GRT)	Fate
25 September 1942	Empire Bell	United Kingdom	1,744	Sunk
4 November 1942	Hatimura	United Kingdom	6,690	Sunk
9 January 1943	Empire Lytton	United Kingdom	9,807	Sunk
27 January 1943	Julia Ward Howe	United States	7,176	Sunk

== Bibliography ==
- Bishop, Chris (2006). Kriegsmarine U-Boats, 1939-45. London: Amber Books. ISBN 978-1-904687-96-2.
- Busch, Rainer; Röll, Hans-Joachim (1999). German U-boat commanders of World War II : a biographical dictionary. Translated by Brooks, Geoffrey. London, Annapolis, Md: Greenhill Books, Naval Institute Press. ISBN 1-55750-186-6.
- Busch, Rainer; Röll, Hans-Joachim (1999). Deutsche U-Boot-Verluste von September 1939 bis Mai 1945 [German U-boat losses from September 1939 to May 1945]. Der U-Boot-Krieg (in German). Vol. IV. Hamburg, Berlin, Bonn: Mittler. ISBN 3-8132-0514-2.
- Gröner, Erich; Jung, Dieter; Maass, Martin (1991). U-boats and Mine Warfare Vessels. German Warships 1815–1945. Vol. 2. Translated by Thomas, Keith; Magowan, Rachel. London: Conway Maritime Press. ISBN 0-85177-593-4.
- Kemp, Paul (1999). U-Boats Destroyed - German Submarine Losses in the World Wars. London: Arms & Armour. ISBN 1-85409-515-3.
