= SS Port Nicholson (1918) =

British cargo ship sunk in 1942

Coordinates: 42°11′N 69°25′W

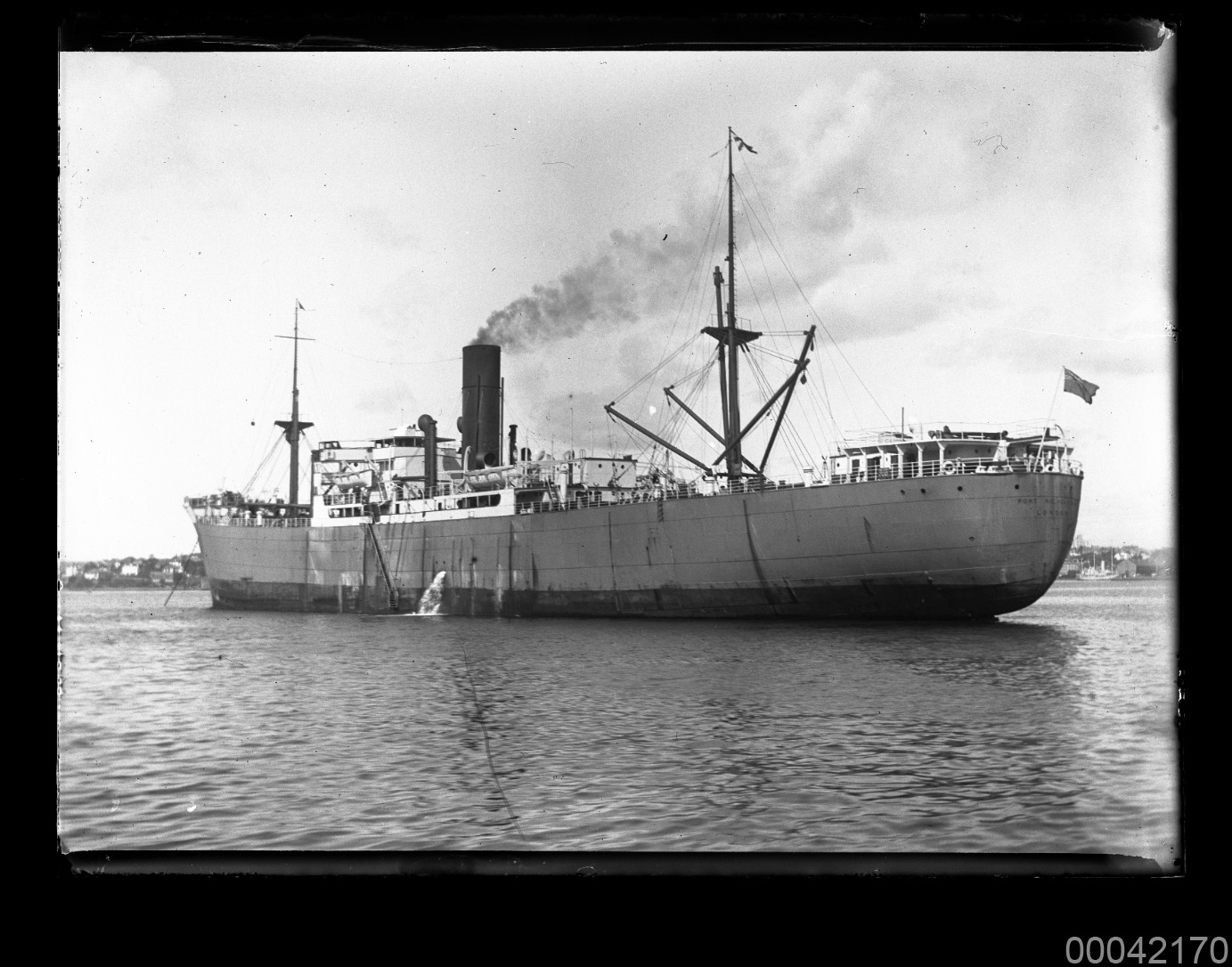

History

United Kingdom
- Name: Port Nicholson
- Namesake: historical name for Wellington Harbour
- Owner: Port Line
- Port of registry: London
- Builder: Hawthorn, Leslie & Co, Hebburn
- Yard number: 487
- Launched: November 1918
- Completed: 13 May 1919
- Identification: UK Official Number 143058; code letters JWKB (1919–33); call sign GRST (1930–42)
- Fate: Sunk 16 June 1942

General characteristics
- Type: refrigerated cargo ship
- Tonnage: 8,402 GRT, 5,338 NRT
- Length: 481.2 ft (146.7 m)
- Beam: 62.3 ft (19.0 m)
- Draught: 30 ft 0 in (9.14 m)
- Depth: 33.0 ft (10.1 m)
- Installed power: 967 NHP
- Propulsion: 4 × steam turbines SR geared; 2 × screw propellers
- Speed: 14 kn (26 km/h; 16 mph)
- Capacity: 328,592 cubic feet (9,304.7 m^{3}) refrigerated

SS Port Nicholson was a British refrigerated cargo ship owned by the Port Line. She entered service shortly after the First World War and was sunk by a German U-boat in the Second World War. Her wreck has subsequently been discovered, attracting attention with claims that she was carrying a large cargo of platinum ingots and other precious metals when she was sunk.

== Description ==
Port Nicholson was 481.2 ft (146.67 m) long, with a beam of 62.3 feet (18.99 m). She had a depth of 33.0 ft (10.06 m) and a draught of 30 feet 1 inch (9.17 m). She was assessed as 8,402 GRT, 5,338 NRT. She was propelled by four steam turbines of 967 nhp, single-reduction geared, driving twin screws. The turbines were built by Hawthorn Leslie, they could propel her at 14 knots (26 km/h).

Port Nicholson was a refrigerated cargo ship. She had 328,598 cubic feet (9,304.9 m^{3}) of refrigerated cargo space. There were two refrigerating machines. Coolant was brine and the cargo holds were insulated with cork.

== Construction and early years ==
Hawthorn, Leslie and Company built Port Nicholson at its Hebburn yard. She was launched in November 1918 and completed on 13 May 1919. Her owners were Commonwealth and Dominion Line, which registered her in London. Her United Kingdom official number was 143508 and her code letters were JWKB. By 1930 her call sign was GRST.

She made sailings between the United Kingdom, and Australia and New Zealand. During her service life, she was involved in a number of incidents. On 23 October 1924, she ran aground at Las Palmas, Canary Islands, Spain and was holed. She was refloated on 6 November. Port Nicholson was twice damaged by fire. The first incident occurred while en route to New Zealand in 1928, when her cargo caught fire, forcing her to put into Pago Pago. The second occurred while moored in Melbourne in 1937, when the Government Cool Stores caught fire. Port Nicholson was adjacent to the wharves at the time, and had a cargo of cattle on board. Water was sprayed onto the livestock, saving them. In 1937 the Commonwealth and Dominion Line was re-branded the Port Line. Port Nicholson was involved in another accident on 9 June 1938, when she collided with and sank the tugboat Ocean Cock, with the loss of four lives.

== Final voyage and sinking ==
Location where Port Nicholson was torpedoed and sunk off Massachusetts, United States.

With the outbreak of the Second World War, Port Nicholson remained in service, transporting cargoes around the globe. Her last voyage, in 1942, took her from Avonmouth across the Atlantic to Halifax, via Barry. She was at Halifax on 14 June 1942, and left for Wellington, with an intended call at New York City and a transit of the Panama Canal. She formed part of convoy XB 25, one of the coastal convoy routes, that ran between Halifax Harbour and Boston. She was under the command of her master, Harold Charles Jeffrey, and was carrying a cargo of 1,600 tons of automobile parts and 4,000 tons of military stores.

The convoy was tracked by the German submarine U-87, commanded by Joachim Berger. At 4.17 hours on the morning of 16 June 1942 he fired a torpedo at the convoy, which was then 100 miles (160 km) off Portland, Maine. He fired a second torpedo a minute later, but the gale conditions at the time prevented him from observing the results accurately, and he recorded that while one torpedo had hit a ship, the other seemed to have missed. In fact, both torpedoes struck Port Nicholson, the first in the engine room, the second in the stern. Two men in the engine room (7th Engineer William McGrery and Greaser Willian John) were killed immediately, and as Port Nicholson began to settle by the stern, the remaining crew abandoned ship and were picked up by the Royal Canadian Navy corvette HMCS Nanaimo.

Port Nicholson did not sink immediately, and by dawn was still afloat. The following is taken from a letter dated 3 July 1947 from J. R. Roper, Director, Port Line Ltd, to Mrs. Irene Munday, widow of the ship's Chief Officer: "Very early the next morning the cutter from this ship [i.e. HMCS Nanaimo] with a party of eight put off to investigate the possibilities of towing your husband's ship, which was still afloat. The party consisted of Captain Jeffrey [the master], your husband [Chief Officer Philip Munday], and the 1st Lieutenant [Lieutenant John Molson Walkley] and five ratings of HMS... [sic: i.e. Nanaimo]. They all boarded the disabled ship and signalled that everything seemed to be all right. However, 3/4 of an hour later the vessel's stern was seen to be settling rapidly, and the eight men made for the cutter, which unfortunately was unable to get clear in time, and was dragged under by the sinking ship. Only a matter of seconds elapsed between the time the stern commenced settling and the ship finally disappeared. Three of the men were seen to be clinging to a raft and a fourth swimming in the water. A thorough search was made for a considerable while but no trace of any more survivors was seen..." Nanaimo rescued the two surviving ratings, and landed survivors from Port Nicholson at Boston.

== Rediscovery ==
It was reported that the wreck of Port Nicholson was discovered in 2008 by Greg Brooks, of the US company Sub Sea Research, but the discovery was kept secret until February 2012. Brooks at first claimed to be investigating an unidentified vessel, codenamed Blue Baron, that lay off the coast of Guyana in South America. This was an attempt to throw fellow treasure seekers off the trail, as Brooks believed that Port Nicholson was carrying a valuable cargo of platinum, gold, and industrial diamonds at the time of her sinking, payment from the Soviet Union for material delivered under lend-lease, which would now be worth around £2 billion. He reported that two Soviet envoys accompanied the ship, and that the Soviet government reimbursed the US government for the lost payment. The salvors have claimed that underwater exploration of the wreck has revealed boxes too heavy to lift, that are supposed to contain the platinum ingots. The British, US and Russian governments may make claims over the cargo should anything of serious value be discovered. Several maritime and Second World War historians have cast doubts over whether the ship was carrying such a precious cargo, citing the lack of documentation, and that had Port Nicholson been carrying such a cargo, she may have been partly salvaged already.

It was reported in December 2013 that Brooks had put his vessel Sea Hunter up for sale and laid off most of his staff and crew. He is also being sued by a group of investors who had provided over $8 million in financing, on the grounds of fraud and misrepresentation of the actual existence of any platinum or other valuable cargo. Several leading wreck salvage experts, including Robert Marx, had gone on record questioning Brooks' claim of such cargo and laying out a long list of false claims of success in treasure hunting going back for decades. In April 2015, Brooks' rights to Port Nicholson were dismissed with prejudice, preventing him from pursuing any further salvage of the shipwreck. The order also required him to return six items he had recovered. Federal investigators have investigated allegations that Brooks defrauded investors.

On 7 December 2018, the FBI has said it is no longer pursuing the case and there is a five-year statute of limitations on federal fraud cases.
