= Wilfrid Oulton =

Royal Air Force officer (1911–1997)

Wilfrid Ewart Oulton
- Born: 27 July 1911; Monks Coppenhall, Cheshire
- Died: 31 October 1997 (aged 86) Lymington, Hampshire
- Allegiance: United Kingdom
- Branch: Royal Air Force
- Service years: 1931–1961
- Rank: Air Vice-Marshal
- Service number: 26209
- Commands: Joint Anti-Submarine School; Joint Services Staff College; Joint Task Force Grapple
- Conflicts: World War II: Battle of the Atlantic
- Awards: Companion of the Order of the Bath; Commander of the Order of the British Empire; Distinguished Service Order; Distinguished Flying Cross; Mentioned in Despatches (3)

Air Vice-Marshal Wilfrid Ewart Oulton, CB, CBE, DSO, DFC (27 July 1911 – 31 October 1997) was an officer in the Royal Air Force. During the Second World War he was credited with sinking three German U-boats—U-463, U-663, and U-563—in one month while serving in RAF Coastal Command. He was in charge of the British nuclear tests of hydrogen bombs in the Pacific Ocean in Operation Grapple in 1957.

== Early life ==
Wilfrid Ewart Oulton was born in Monks Coppenhall, Cheshire, on 27 July 1911, the first of eight children of Llewellin Oulton, a schoolteacher. His mother, Martha née Wellings, died when he was young, and his father remarried. He was educated at Abertillery County School, where his father was the chemistry teacher. He was awarded a scholarship to University College, Cardiff, where he studied engineering, but in 1929 he entered the Royal Air Force College Cranwell. He represented the RAF College at boxing and was awarded the Abdy Gerrard Fellowes Memorial Prize.

Oulton graduated at the top of his class, and was commissioned as a pilot officer in the Royal Air Force on 25 July 1931. He trained as a pilot at No. 3 Flying Training School, and then as a flying boat pilot at RAF Calshot. On 4 April 1932 he was posted to No. 204 Squadron at RAF Mount Batten, where he flew Supermarine Southampton and Supermarine Scapa flying boats. He was posted to No. 202 Squadron in Malta on 19 August 1932; he was promoted to flying officer on 25 January 1933. He joined the staff of RAF Hal Far on 29 November 1933, and married Sarah (Terry) Davies in Malta in 1935. The couple had three sons, two of whom joined the Royal Air Force; the other joined the Royal Canadian Air Force. Oulton returned to the United Kingdom as a student at the Air Navigation School on 17 March 1936, and became an instructor at the school on 11 November 1936. He was promoted to squadron leader on 1 December 1938. He was also the RAF squash champion in 1938–39.

== Second World War ==
When the Second World War broke out in September 1939, Oulton was flying Avro Ansons with No. 217 Squadron, based at RAF Pembroke Dock, but he was soon reassigned to the Ministry of Aircraft Production. He was mentioned in despatches on 20 February 1940. Oulton was promoted to wing commander on 1 March 1941, and sent to Washington, DC, to organise training in North America for RAF navigators. On 1 April 1943, he was appointed commander of No. 58 Squadron RAF, flying Handley Page Halifax bombers. In May 1943, he participated in the sinking of three German U-boats in the Bay of Biscay. He attacked and sank U-663 on 7 May, then U-463 on 15 May. On 31 May, he shared in the sinking of U-563 with aircraft of No. 228 Squadron RAF and No. 10 Squadron RAAF. For this feat he was awarded the Distinguished Flying Cross on 4 June 1943.

In October 1943, Oulton became commander of RAF Lajes, a newly established base in the Portuguese Azores. From this base, No. 206 Squadron RAF and No. 220 Squadron RAF covered part of the Mid-Atlantic gap with their Flying Fortress bombers. For this service, he was made a companion of the Distinguished Service Order on 12 November 1943. He was promoted to group captain on 1 January 1944, and became commander of the flying boat base at RAF Castle Archdale in Northern Ireland. He was mentioned in despatches a second time on 2 June 1944. In March 1945, Oulton was appointed deputy director of maritime operations in Northern Ireland. At the end of the war he was deputy director of flying (air traffic) control, and established the air traffic control arrangements for the new airport at Heathrow Airport. He was mentioned in despatches a third time on 8 June 1945.

== Postwar ==
In 1946, Oulton became the director of the Joint Anti-Submarine School at RAF Ballykelly in Northern Ireland. On 1 October that year, he reverted to his permanent rank of wing commander. He joined the faculty of the Joint Services Staff College in 1948, and was promoted to group captain again on 1 January 1949. This was followed by a posting to South America as air attaché to Argentina in 1950. Oulton was appointed a Commander of the Order of the British Empire in the 1953 Coronation Honours. He attended the Imperial Defence College in 1954, and joined the directorate of staff training before becoming director of operations. He was promoted to air commodore on 1 January 1955.

In 1956, the British hydrogen bomb programme approached fruition, and preparations began for a nuclear test series, which was given the secret codename Operation Grapple. Rear Admiral Kaye Edden, the Commandant of the Joint Services Staff College was approached to be the Task Force Commander (TFC), but he pointed out that the test series would primarily be an RAF responsibility, and that it would be more appropriate to have an RAF officer in charge. Oulton was appointed TFC on 6 February 1956, with the acting rank of air vice-marshal from 1 March 1956. Christmas Island was chosen as a base. It was claimed by both Britain and the United States, but the Americans were willing to let the British use it for the tests. Oulton's wartime experience establishing a base in the Azores was useful in developing one in the Pacific Ocean. The first test series was not a success, and a second series was required. This time the desired result was achieved. Oulton was promoted to the substantive rank of air vice-marshal on 1 January 1958, and was appointed a Companion of the Order of the Bath in the 1958 New Year Honours. His final posting was on 21 April 1958, as Senior Air Staff Officer at Headquarters Coastal Command at RAF Northwood. He retired from the RAF at his own request on 1 January 1961.

== Later life ==
Oulton joined the board of EMI Electronics, where he oversaw the company's military programmes, and forged a business partnership with Hughes Electronics in the United States. He was an honorary fellow of Cardiff University, and a fellow of the Royal Institute of Navigation and of the Institute of Electronic and Radio Engineers. He was a member of the Royal Institute of Navigation Council from 1962 to 1965, and was its Vice President in 1965. He wrote two books, Christmas Island Cracker (1987), about his experiences in Operation Grapple, and Technocrat (1995), a biography of the American nuclear scientist Allen Crocker. His wife Sarah died in 1990, and the following year he married Leticia Malcolm. He died of bladder cancer and prostate cancer at Lymington, Hampshire, on 31 October 1997. His remains were cremated, and his ashes scattered over the Bay of Biscay by an aircraft of No. 206 Squadron.

== Publications ==
- Oulton, Wilfrid (1987). Christmas Island Cracker: an Account of the Planning and Execution of the British Thermonuclear Bomb Tests. London: Thomas Harmsworth Publishing Co. ISBN 978-0-948807-04-6.
- Oulton, Wilfrid (1995). Technocrat: Biography of a Boffin. New York: Vantage Press. ISBN 978-0-533-11221-0.
