= HMS Pimpernel =

HMS Pimpernel (K71) was a Flower-class corvette that served in the Royal Navy during the Second World War.

== Construction and career ==
The ship was ordered in September 1939, laid down on 19 July 1940 at Harland & Wolff in Belfast and launched 16 November 1940. The ship was commissioned 9 Jan 1941.

Between 19 July and 1 August 1941, the ship acted as one of the escort ships for Convoy OG 69.

In August 1942, the ship picked up survivors from several ships that had been sunk by U-boats, including by U-553. Pimpernel scuttled the British ship Empire Bede which had been heavily damaged by torpedo fire.

Between 3 and 12 January 1943 the ship formed part of the escort squadron for Convoy TM 1.

In May 1943, the ship acted as an escort for the convoy ONS 7 between Scotland and North America.

The ship participated in convoys OS 105 and KMS 79 from 17 to 21 January 1945.

The ship was broken up and scrapped at Portaferry, Northern Ireland in October 1948.
