= HMS Godetia (K226) =

Flower-class corvette

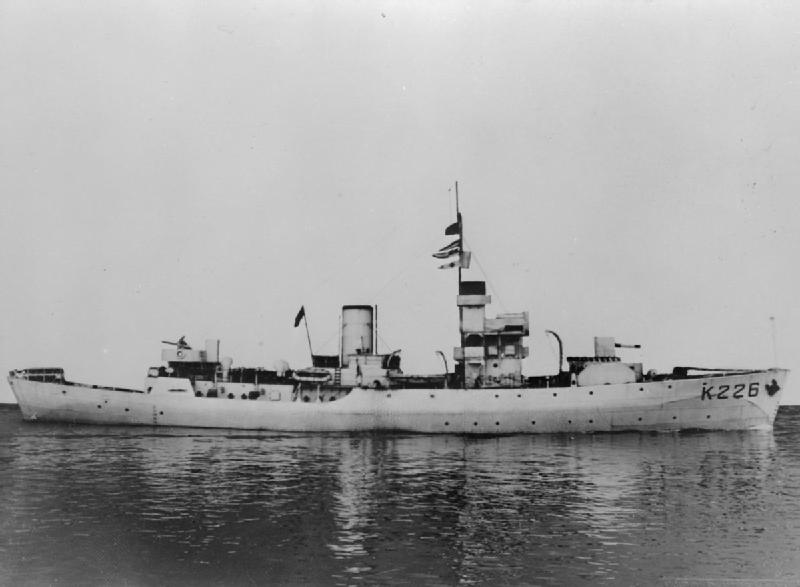
- HMS Godetia underway.

History

United Kingdom
- Name: HMS Godetia, originally Dart
- Ordered: 24 August 1940
- Builder: John Crown & Sons Ltd, Sunderland, England
- Laid down: 15 January 1941
- Launched: 24 September 1941
- Commissioned: 23 February 1942
- Decommissioned: October 1945
- Out of service: Transferred to the Royal Navy Belgian Section
- Reinstated: Returned to the Royal Navy
- Fate: Scrapped in 1947

Belgium
- Name: HMS Godetia
- Acquired: 12 February 1942
- Out of service: 16 December 1944
- Fate: Returned to the Royal Navy

General characteristics (as built)
- Class & type: Flower-class corvette
- Displacement: 1,015 long tons (1,031 t) (standard)
- Length: 208 ft 3 in (63.47 m) (o/a)
- Beam: 33 ft 1 in (10.08 m)
- Draught: 13 ft 6 in (4.11 m)
- Installed power: 2,750 ihp (2,050 kW); 2 × cylindrical boilers
- Propulsion: 1 × Shaft; 1 × Vertical triple-expansion steam engine
- Speed: 16 knots (30 km/h; 18 mph)
- Range: 3,450 nmi (6,390 km; 3,970 mi) at 12 knots (22 km/h; 14 mph)
- Complement: 85
- Sensors & processing systems: 1 × Type 123A ASDIC
- Armament: 1 × BL 4-inch (102 mm) Mk IX gun; 2 × Oerlikon 20 mm (0.8 in) cannon; 2 × Depth charge throwers; 2 × Rails with 40 depth charges

HMS Godetia (pennant number: K226; originally named HMS Dart) was the second Flower-class corvette with that name built for the Royal Navy. She served during the Second World War as part of the Section Belge of the Royal Navy (RNSB). With the liberation of Belgium in late 1944, the vessel was returned to the United Kingdom. In common with other Flower-class corvettes, the ship was named after an eponymous flower.

== Royal Navy Belgian Section ==
=== Service in the Antilles and US Coast ===
On 12 February 1942, Godetia was transferred by the Royal Navy to the newly formed naval branch of the Belgian forces in exile, the Royal Navy, Section Belge (RNSB). Godetia was allocated to the escort group B5 which normally protected North Atlantic convoy routes. Due to severe losses on the American coasts, the group was relocated to the Atlantic coast of the US and the Antilles in 1942. In 1943, she served in the Atlantic and Mediterranean as part of the escort group B5.

In April 1942 she transferred to the American coast with outgoing convoy ON 87. In May and June she escorted four convoys ( OT-2, TO-2, TO-8 and OT-11 ) between Trinidad and Curaçao. In July and August she escorted five convoys ( TAW-1, WAT-5, TAW-9, WAT-15 and TAW-16 ) between Key West and Trinidad via Curaçao. In September, she escorted two convoys between Guantanamo Bay Naval Base and New York City.

==== Convoy TM-1 ====
On 29 December, the Godetia set out with two tankers from Trinidad to join up with convoy TM 1. According to U-124, its attacks were frustrated by the Godetia and a PBY catalina flying boat, but according to Gasaway, the U-124 attacked the two lone tankers with four torpedoes that malfunctioned or missed, and was then driven off by the catalina which bombed it.

The Godetia then joined her escort group, the destroyer Havelock and the corvettes Saxifrage and Pimpernel to provide escort for TM 1. The convoy TM 1 was an exclusive fast-tanker convoy, bringing urgent fuel supplies to the newly established front in North Africa. During the voyage to Gibraltar, the convoy was attacked by U-boats. The convoy was nearly annihilated, but Godetia is credited with frustrating an attack by U-575 and damaging U-134.

=== Service in the North Atlantic ===
After this convoy disaster, the B5 escort group is reformed and return to the North Atlantic. One of the reinforcements for the B5 group is the second Belgian corvette, HMS Buttercup.

==== Convoy ON 168 ====
The first atlantic convoy to escort is ON 168 in February 1943. Convoy ON 168 is lucky to escape battle with the U-boats when it passes a German patrol line through a gap caused by the undetected loss of a U-boat on 5 March 1943.

==== Convoy SC 122 ====
Only after 3 days rest in the port of St-John's, Canada, the B5 escort group set out to pick up the Mid Ocean escort for the next convoy SC 122, which was part of one of the major convoy battles of the war.

On 16 March, before the battle really started, Godetia was detached to scuttle a disabled escort trawler HMS Campobello and rescue its crew. It took more than a day before she could catch up with the convoy and Godetia was absent during the first night of U-boat attacks.

As soon as the Godetia rejoined the convoy during the day of the 17th, there was a submerged daylight attack of U-338 which resulted in 1 merchant ship being sunk. Together with another escort, the USS destroyer Upshur, the Godetia retaliated with 3 full pattern depth charge attacks on the boat but without success. These attacks however drove off the U-338 and also another boat in the vicinity, the U-666.

During the night of the 17th the U-305 made a successful attack and sank 2 ships. Since the rescue ship of the convoy was still lagging behind the convoy after picking up survivors of the previous night attacks, the Godetia was ordered to pick up survivors. During rescue work, the radar of the Godetia picked up the surfaced U-305, and the Godetia gave chase. The U-305 however could dive before Godetias deck gun could engage her, and since the asdic was out of order by this time, a depth charge attack could not be mounted neither and the U-boat escaped unscathed.

==== Convoy SC 126 ====
After the dramatic passage of SC 122, the next convoy SC 126 in April 1943 was quite uneventful : thanks to good intelligence it could be rerouted and avoid the german patrol lines.

==== Convoy ONS 7 ====
This was the last convoy escorted during the height of the battle of the Atlantic. It is attacked but after the U-boats sink one ship from the convoy, they lose two of their number to the convoy escort and 2 more to air patrols. This convoy battle is a clear defeat for the German U-boats and it is one of the factors that made the Germans call off their U-boat offensive on the North Atlantic convoy lanes.

=== Service in the Mid Atlantic ===
Godetia is in Augustus 1943 detached from EG B5 to help with the escort of convoy UGS-13.

In September she is part of the escort of the small convoy XK-11.

With the Escort Group B5, in October 1943 she takes part in operation Alacrity : the occupation of the Azores Islands.

=== Service in the English Channel ===
She was involved in the operations in the English Channel during Operation Overlord. On D-day she was part of force L, the escort group for the follow-up waves on the Britisch-Canadian beaches Juno, Gold and Sword.

== Royal Navy ==
On 16 December 1944, Godetia was re-transferred back to the Royal Navy. The Belgian crew left the ship in order to go back to the previous task of mineclearing. The port of Antwerp had been liberated in September 1944, but its entrances were heavily mined and needed clearing before the port could be put into use again.

In recognition of the role of Godetia's role during the Second World War, the Belgian navy later operated a ship with the same name. Godetia continued to serve (with a British crew) in a convoy escorting role until October 1945 when she was decommissioned.

From April 1942 to May 1945, Godetia escorted 70 convoys.

In 1947, she was scrapped.

== Books ==
- Blair, Clay (1998). Hitler's U-Boat War [Volume 2]: The Hunted 1942–1945. Cassell. ISBN 0-304-35261-6.
- Gasaway, E.B. (1975). Grey Wolf, Grey Sea. Futura Publications. ISBN 0-8600-71367.
- Middlebrook, Martin (1978). Convoy: the battle for convoys SC. 122 and HX. 229. Penguin. ISBN 0-14-004613-5.
- Rohwer, jurgen; Hummelchen, Gerhard (1992). Chronology of the war at sea 1939-1945: the naval history of world War Two. Naval Institute Press. ISBN 1-55750-105-X.

== Bibliography ==
- Colledge, J. J.; Warlow, Ben (2006) [1969]. Ships of the Royal Navy: The Complete Record of All Fighting Ships of the Royal Navy from the 15th Century to the Present (3rd Rev ed.). London: Chatham Publishing. ISBN 978-1-86176-281-8. OCLC 67375475.
- Lenton, H. T. (1998). British & Empire Warships of the Second World War. Annapolis, Maryland: Naval Institute Press. ISBN 1-55750-048-7.
