= HMCS Nanaimo (K101) =

Flower-class corvette

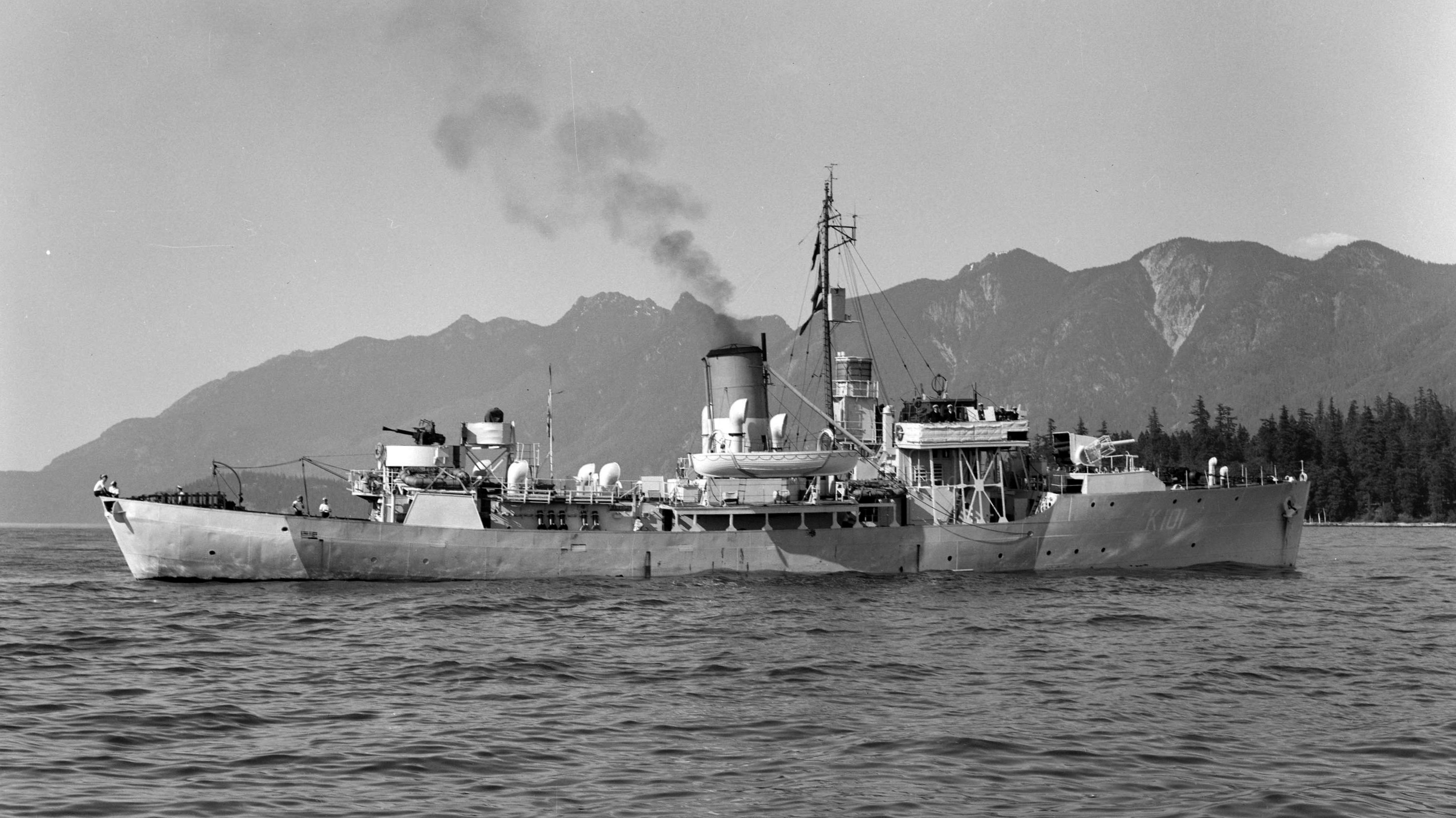
- HMCS Nanaimo

History

Canada
- Name: Nanaimo
- Namesake: Nanaimo, British Columbia
- Ordered: 14 February 1940
- Builder: Yarrows Ltd., Esquimalt
- Laid down: 27 April 1940
- Launched: 28 October 1940
- Commissioned: 26 April 1941
- Out of service: 28 September 1945
- Identification: Pennant number: K101
- Honours and awards: Atlantic 1941–44 Gulf of St. Lawrence 1944
- Fate: Sold for mercantile use 1953. Scrapped 1966.

General characteristics
- Class & type: Flower-class corvette (original)
- Displacement: 925 long tons (940 t; 1,036 short tons)
- Length: 205 ft (62.48 m)o/a
- Beam: 33 ft (10.06 m)
- Draught: 11.5 ft (3.51 m)
- Propulsion: Single shaft; 2 × fire tube Scotch boilers; 1 × 4-cycle triple-expansion reciprocating steam engine; 2,750 ihp (2,050 kW)
- Speed: 16 knots (29.6 km/h)
- Range: 3,500 nautical miles (6,482 km) at 12 knots (22.2 km/h)
- Complement: 85
- Sensors & processing systems: 1 × SW1C or 2C radar; 1 × Type 123A or Type 127DV sonar
- Armament: 1 × BL 4 in (102 mm) Mk.IX single gun; 2 × .50 cal machine gun (twin); 2 × Lewis .303 cal machine gun (twin); 2 × Mk.II depth charge throwers; 2 × depth charge rails with 40 depth charges; Originally fitted with minesweeping gear, later removed

HMCS Nanaimo was a Flower-class corvette that served with the Royal Canadian Navy during the Second World War. She served on both coasts during the war. She was named for Nanaimo, British Columbia.

== Background ==
Flower-class corvettes like Nanaimo serving with the Royal Canadian Navy during the Second World War were different from earlier and more traditional sail-driven corvettes. The "corvette" designation was created by the French for classes of small warships; the Royal Navy borrowed the term for a period but discontinued its use in 1877. During the hurried preparations for war in the late 1930s, Winston Churchill reactivated the corvette class, needing a name for smaller ships used in an escort capacity, in this case based on a whaling ship design. The generic name "flower" was used to designate the class of these ships, which – in the Royal Navy – were named after flowering plants.

Corvettes commissioned by the Royal Canadian Navy during the Second World War were named after communities for the most part, to better represent the people who took part in building them. This idea was put forth by Admiral Percy W. Nelles. Sponsors were commonly associated with the community for which the ship was named. Royal Navy corvettes were designed as open sea escorts, while Canadian corvettes were developed for coastal auxiliary roles which was exemplified by their minesweeping gear. Eventually the Canadian corvettes would be modified to allow them to perform better on the open seas.

== Construction ==
Nanaimo was ordered 14 February 1940 as part of the 1939-1940 Flower-class building program. She was laid down by Yarrows Ltd. at Esquimalt, British Columbia on 27 April 1940 and launched 28 October later that year. She was commissioned 26 April 1941 at Esquimalt.

Nanaimo only underwent one significant refit. From December 1944 until 21 February 1945, she was in the shipyards at Esquimalt. Nanaimo was one of the few Flower-class corvettes never to receive an upgraded fo'c'sle.

== Service history ==
After commissioning Nanaimo was sent to Halifax on the east coast, arriving on 27 June 1941. She spent the next three months carrying out local escort duties. She was reassigned to Newfoundland Command in October 1941, escorting convoys between St. John's and Iceland.

In March 1942, Nanaimo was assigned to the Western Local Escort Force (WLEF). In June 1943, when the escort groups were formed, she was initially a part of group W-9. On 10 June 1942 she picked up 86 survivors from the British merchant Port Nicholson that was torpedoed and sunk by U-87 northeast of Cape Cod. She was transferred to W-7 in April 1944 and remained with them for the rest of her posting with WLEF.

In November 1944, Nanaimo was ordered to join Pacific Coast Command. She arrived at Esquimalt 7 December 1944. She immediately underwent a refit completing on 21 February and only returning to service in March 1945. She remained with the Pacific fleet until the end of the war.

Nanaimo was paid off for disposal at Esquimalt on 28 September 1945. She was sold for mercantile conversion. She was converted to a whale-catcher at Kiel in 1953 with a gross register tonnage of 713 tons. She reappeared under a Dutch flag with the new name Rene W. Vinke. She was broken up at Cape Town, South Africa by South African Metal & Machinery Co Pty Ltd in 1966.
