= German submarine U-105 =

U-105 may refer to one of the following German submarines:

- SM U-105, a Type U 93 submarine launched in 1917 that served in the First World War, and surrendered in 1918; became French submarine Jean Autric.
  - During the First World War, Germany also had these submarines with similar names:
    - SM UB-105, a Type UB III submarine launched in 1917 and surrendered in 1919.
    - SM UC-105, a Type UC III submarine launched in 1918 and surrendered the same year.
- German submarine U-105 (1940), a Type IXB submarine that served in the Second World War and was sunk in 1943.
