= Wolfpack Kreuzotter =

Wolfpack Kreuzotter (Common Viper) was a wolfpack of German U-boats that operated during 1942 in the World War II Battle of the Atlantic.
