= German submarine U-522 =

German World War II submarine

Coordinates: 31°27′N 26°22′W

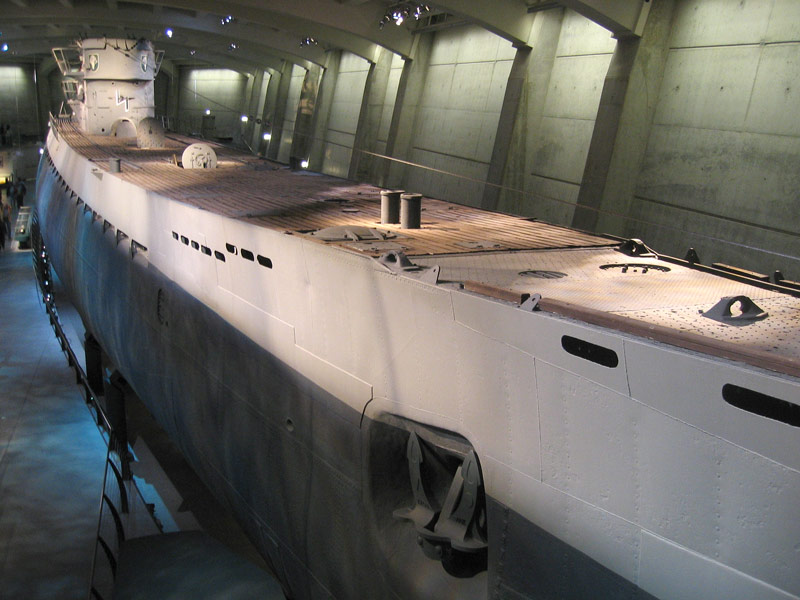
- U-505, a typical Type IXC boat

History

Nazi Germany
- Name: U-522
- Ordered: 14 February 1940
- Builder: Deutsche Werft, Hamburg
- Yard number: 337
- Laid down: 9 July 1941
- Launched: 1 April 1942
- Commissioned: 11 June 1942
- Fate: Sunk on 23 February 1943

General characteristics
- Class & type: Type IXC submarine
- Displacement: 1,120 t (1,100 long tons) surfaced; 1,232 t (1,213 long tons) submerged
- Length: 76.76 m (251 ft 10 in) o/a; 58.75 m (192 ft 9 in) pressure hull
- Beam: 6.76 m (22 ft 2 in) o/a; 4.40 m (14 ft 5 in) pressure hull
- Height: 9.60 m (31 ft 6 in)
- Draught: 4.70 m (15 ft 5 in)
- Installed power: 4,400 PS (3,200 kW; 4,300 bhp) (diesels); 1,000 PS (740 kW; 990 shp) (electric)
- Propulsion: 2 shafts; 2 × diesel engines; 2 × electric motors
- Speed: 18.3 knots (33.9 km/h; 21.1 mph) surfaced; 7.3 knots (13.5 km/h; 8.4 mph) submerged
- Range: 13,450 nmi (24,910 km; 15,480 mi) at 10 knots (19 km/h; 12 mph) surfaced; 64 nmi (119 km; 74 mi) at 4 knots (7.4 km/h; 4.6 mph) submerged
- Test depth: 230 m (750 ft)
- Complement: 4 officers, 44 enlisted
- Armament: 6 × torpedo tubes (4 bow, 2 stern); 22 × 53.3 cm (21 in) torpedoes; 1 × 10.5 cm (4.1 in) SK C/32 deck gun (180 rounds); 1 × 3.7 cm (1.5 in) SK C/30 AA gun; 1 × twin 2 cm FlaK 30 AA guns

Service record
- Part of: 4th U-boat Flotilla 11 June – 30 September 1942; 2nd U-boat Flotilla 1 October 1942 – 23 February 1943
- Identification codes: M 06 857
- Commanders: Kptlt. Herbert Schneider; 11 June 1942 – 23 February 1943
- Operations: 2 patrols: 1st patrol: 8 October – 2 December 1942; 2nd patrol: 31 December 1942 – 23 February 1943
- Victories: 7 merchant ships sunk (45,826 GRT); 2 merchant ships damaged (12,479 GRT)

German submarine U-522 was a Type IXC U-boat of Nazi Germany's Kriegsmarine during World War II.

She was laid down at the Deutsche Werft (yard) in Hamburg as yard number 337 on 9 July 1941, launched on 1 April 1942 and commissioned on 11 June with Kapitänleutnant Herbert Schneider in command.

U-522 began her service career with training as part of the 4th U-boat Flotilla from 11 June 1942. She was reassigned to the 2nd flotilla for operations on 1 October 1942.

She carried out two patrols and sank seven ships. She damaged two more. She was sunk on 23 February 1943 in mid-Atlantic west of Madeira by a British warship.

== Design ==
German Type IXC submarines were slightly larger than the original Type IXBs. U-522 had a displacement of 1,120 tonnes (1,100 long tons) when at the surface and 1,232 tonnes (1,213 long tons) while submerged. The U-boat had a total length of 76.76 m (251 ft 10 in), a pressure hull length of 58.75 m (192 ft 9 in), a beam of 6.76 m (22 ft 2 in), a height of 9.60 m (31 ft 6 in), and a draught of 4.70 m (15 ft 5 in). The submarine was powered by two MAN M 9 V 40/46 supercharged four-stroke, nine-cylinder diesel engines producing a total of 4,400 metric horsepower (3,240 kW; 4,340 shp) for use while surfaced, two Siemens-Schuckert 2 GU 345/34 double-acting electric motors producing a total of 1,000 shaft horsepower (1,010 PS; 750 kW) for use while submerged. She had two shafts and two 1.92 m (6 ft) propellers. The boat was capable of operating at depths of up to 230 metres (750 ft).

The submarine had a maximum surface speed of 18.3 knots (33.9 km/h; 21.1 mph) and a maximum submerged speed of 7.3 knots (13.5 km/h; 8.4 mph). When submerged, the boat could operate for 63 nautical miles (117 km; 72 mi) at 4 knots (7.4 km/h; 4.6 mph); when surfaced, she could travel 13,450 nautical miles (24,910 km; 15,480 mi) at 10 knots (19 km/h; 12 mph). U-522 was fitted with six 53.3 cm (21 in) torpedo tubes (four fitted at the bow and two at the stern), 22 torpedoes, one 10.5 cm (4.13 in) SK C/32 naval gun, 180 rounds, and a 3.7 cm (1.5 in) SK C/30 as well as a 2 cm (0.79 in) C/30 anti-aircraft gun. The boat had a complement of forty-eight.

== Service history ==
=== First patrol ===
The boat departed Kiel on 8 October 1942, moved through the North Sea, negotiated the gap between Iceland and the Faroe Islands and entered the Atlantic Ocean.

She opened her account when she damaged the Hartington about 450 nautical miles (830 km; 520 mi) east of Belle Isle (off the main island of Newfoundland) on 2 November 1942. The abandoned Hartington was sunk later that same day by U-521.

U-522 sank the Martima 500 nautical miles (930 km; 580 mi) northeast of St. Johns on the same day as the attack on the Hartington and went on to sink the Parthenonn.

She entered Lorient, on the French Atlantic coast, on 2 December 1942.

=== Second patrol and loss ===
U-522's second foray took her to the mid-Atlantic once again. She sank the Norvik 500 nautical miles (930 km; 580 mi) west of Teneriffe on 9 January 1943. Two days later, she damaged the British Dominion "northeast of the Canary Islands".

She was sunk west of Madeira on 23 February 1943 by depth charges dropped by the sloop (ex-US Coast Guard Cutter) HMS Totland.

Fifty-one men died; there were no survivors.

=== Wolfpacks ===
U-522 took part in two wolfpacks, namely:

- Kreuzotter (8 – 22 November 1942)
- Delphin (3 January – 14 February 1943)

== Summary of raiding history ==
Date	Ship name	Nationality	Tonnage (GRT)	Fate
2 November 1942	Hartington	United Kingdom	5,496	Damaged
2 November 1942	Martima	United Kingdom	5,801	Sunk
2 November 1942	Mount Pelion	Greece	5,655	Sunk
2 November 1942	Parthenonn	Greece	3,189	Sunk
18 November 1942	Yaka	United States	5,432	Sunk
9 January 1943	Minister Wedel	Norway	6,833	Sunk
9 January 1943	Norvik	Panama	10,034	Sunk
11 January 1943	British Dominion	United Kingdom	6,983	Damaged
23 February 1943	Athelprincess	United Kingdom	8,882	Sunk

== Bibliography ==
- Busch, Rainer; Röll, Hans-Joachim (1999). German U-boat commanders of World War II: a biographical dictionary. Translated by Brooks, Geoffrey. London, Annapolis, Md: Greenhill Books, Naval Institute Press. ISBN 1-55750-186-6.
- Busch, Rainer; Röll, Hans-Joachim (1999). Deutsche U-Boot-Verluste von September 1939 bis Mai 1945 [German U-boat losses from September 1939 to May 1945]. Der U-Boot-Krieg (in German). Vol. IV. Hamburg, Berlin, Bonn: Mittler. ISBN 3-8132-0514-2.
- Gröner, Erich; Jung, Dieter; Maass, Martin (1991). U-boats and Mine Warfare Vessels. German Warships 1815–1945. Vol. 2. Translated by Thomas, Keith; Magowan, Rachel. London: Conway Maritime Press. ISBN 0-85177-593-4.
- Kemp, Paul (1997). U-Boats Destroyed - German Submarine Losses in the World Wars. Arms & Armour. ISBN 1-85409-515-3.
