= German submarine U-87 (1941) =

German World War II submarine

Coordinates: 41°36′N 13°31′W

History

Nazi Germany
- Name: U-87
- Ordered: 9 June 1938
- Builder: Flender Werke AG
- Yard number: 283
- Laid down: 18 April 1940
- Launched: 21 June 1941
- Commissioned: 19 August 1941
- Fate: Sunk, 4 March 1943

General characteristics
- Class & type: Type VIIB submarine
- Displacement: 753 tonnes (741 long tons) surfaced; 857 t (843 long tons) submerged
- Length: 66.50 m (218 ft 2 in) o/a; 48.80 m (160 ft 1 in) pressure hull
- Beam: 6.20 m (20 ft 4 in) o/a; 4.70 m (15 ft 5 in) pressure hull
- Height: 9.50 m (31 ft 2 in)
- Draught: 4.74 m (15 ft 7 in)
- Installed power: 2,800–3,200 PS (2,100–2,400 kW; 2,800–3,200 bhp) (diesels); 750 PS (550 kW; 740 shp) (electric)
- Propulsion: 2 shafts; 2 × diesel engines; 2 × electric motors
- Speed: 17.9 knots (33.2 km/h; 20.6 mph) surfaced; 8 knots (15 km/h; 9.2 mph) submerged
- Range: 9,400 nmi (17,400 km; 10,800 mi) at 10 knots (19 km/h; 12 mph) surfaced; 90 nmi (170 km; 100 mi) at 4 knots (7.4 km/h; 4.6 mph) submerged
- Test depth: 220 m (720 ft); Crush depth: 230–250 m (750–820 ft)
- Complement: 4 officers, 40–56 enlisted
- Sensors & processing systems: Gruppenhorchgerät
- Armament: 5 × 53.3 cm (21 in) torpedo tubes (four bow, one stern); 14 × torpedoes or 26 TMA mines; 1 × 8.8 cm (3.46 in) deck gun (220 rounds); 1 × 2 cm (0.79 in) C/30 anti-aircraft gun

Service record
- Part of: 6th U-boat Flotilla; 19 August 1941 – 4 March 1943
- Identification codes: M 00 111
- Commanders: Oblt.z.S. / Kptlt. Joachim Berger; 19 August 1941 – 4 March 1943
- Operations: 5 patrols: 1st patrol: 24 December 1941 – 30 January 1942; 2nd patrol: 22 February – 27 March 1942; 3rd patrol: 19 May – 8 July 1942; 4th patrol: 31 August – 20 November 1942; 5th patrol: 9 January – 4 March 1943
- Victories: 5 merchant ships sunk (38,014 GRT)

German submarine U-87 was a Type VIIB U-boat of Nazi Germany's Kriegsmarine during World War II. The submarine was laid down on 18 April 1940 at the Flender Werke (yard) at Lübeck as yard number 283 and launched on 21 June 1941. She was commissioned on 21 June under the command of Kapitänleutnant Joachim Berger. U-87 trained with 6th U-boat Flotilla until 1 December 1941, when she was put on front-line service.

U-87 sank five ships in her one-year career; she was a member of five wolfpacks.

She was sunk off the coast of Leixões in Portugal during her fifth combat patrol, in March 1943, by warships of the Canadian Navy.

== Design ==
German Type VIIB submarines were preceded by the shorter Type VIIA submarines. U-87 had a displacement of 753 tonnes (741 long tons) when at the surface and 857 tonnes (843 long tons) while submerged. She had a total length of 66.50 m (218 ft 2 in), a pressure hull length of 48.80 m (160 ft 1 in), a beam of 6.20 m (20 ft 4 in), a height of 9.50 m (31 ft 2 in), and a draught of 4.74 m (15 ft 7 in). The submarine was powered by two Germaniawerft F46 four-stroke, six-cylinder supercharged diesel engines producing a total of 2,800 to 3,200 metric horsepower (2,060 to 2,350 kW; 2,760 to 3,160 shp) for use while surfaced, two AEG GU 460/8-276 double-acting electric motors producing a total of 750 metric horsepower (550 kW; 740 shp) for use while submerged. She had two shafts and two 1.23 m (4 ft) propellers. The boat was capable of operating at depths of up to 230 metres (750 ft).

The submarine had a maximum surface speed of 17.9 knots (33.2 km/h; 20.6 mph) and a maximum submerged speed of 8 knots (15 km/h; 9.2 mph). When submerged, the boat could operate for 90 nautical miles (170 km; 100 mi) at 4 knots (7.4 km/h; 4.6 mph); when surfaced, she could travel 8,700 nautical miles (16,100 km; 10,000 mi) at 10 knots (19 km/h; 12 mph). U-87 was fitted with five 53.3 cm (21 in) torpedo tubes (four fitted at the bow and one at the stern), fourteen torpedoes, one 8.8 cm (3.46 in) SK C/35 naval gun, 220 rounds, and one 2 cm (0.79 in) anti-aircraft gun The boat had a complement of between forty-four and sixty.

== Service history ==
=== First patrol ===
U-87 sailed from Kiel on 24 December 1941, and headed out into the Atlantic via the North Sea. On the evening of 31 December, the boat encountered the Cardita, which was straggling behind convoy HX 166, bound for Shellhaven. A single torpedo hit the vessel, resulting in the deaths of twenty-seven crew members. The thirty-three survivors were picked up on 3 January by HMS Onslow and HMS Sabre.

Meanwhile, U-87 completed her voyage around the British isles and crossed the Atlantic, where on 17 January, the submersible struck again. The Norwegian vessel Nyholt was nearing the completion of convoy ON 52's journey from Reykjavík to New York. While passing the Newfoundland coast, Nyholt was struck amidships after she left the safety of her convoy, which had been harassed by U-86 and U-553 over the previous two days. Attempting to divert further from their course to reach Newfoundland, U-87 reacted poorly to the movement and four subsequent torpedoes missed. Another two hits failed to sink the tanker, and U-87 was forced to surface for its crew to fire the deck gun as the ship's crew took to their lifeboats, not to be rescued for another nine days.

U-87 was damaged by gunfire from the tanker, and re-crossed the Atlantic, to arrive at La Pallice in France on 30 January 1942 after 38 days at sea.

=== Second patrol ===
U-87 sailed on 22 February 1942 for a second trip to the east coast of North America, but was held in the Western Approaches to support an attack by the German battleship Tirpitz on convoy PQ 12. Neither Tirpitz nor U-87 sank any ships; the submarine returned to France, but to St. Nazaire on 27 March.

=== Third patrol ===
U-87 sailed on 19 May 1942 and laid a field of 15 TMB mines off Boston. No ships were lost in the minefield; the Allies remained unaware of the mines until after the war. After reloading her tubes with torpedoes, U-87 sank the 8,402 GRT British freighter SS Port Nicholson and the 5,896 GRT American cargo liner Cherokee from convoy XB 25 on 15 June. Eighty-six military personnel drowned. The Port Nicholson was documented to be carrying about 1,707,000 troy ounces of platinum. On 22 June U-87 was damaged off Halifax Harbour, by depth charges from Lockheed Hudson aircraft of 11 Squadron Royal Canadian Air Force. The boat was unable to continue the patrol and returned to port on 8 July.

=== Fourth patrol ===
U-87 sailed on 31 August 1942 to patrol off Freetown, where she sank the 7,392 GRT British freighter Agapenor before docking in Brest on 20 November 1942.

=== Fifth patrol and loss ===
U-87 sailed on 9 January 1943, and was sunk by depth charges from Canadian warships, the corvette HMCS Shediac and the destroyer HMCS St. Croix during an unsuccessful 4 March attack on convoy KMS 10G. On this last patrol she had 50 crewmen on board, none of whom survived the sinking.

=== Wolfpacks ===
U-87 took part in five wolfpacks, namely:

- Zieten (6 – 17 January 1942)
- Westwall (2 – 12 March 1942)
- Iltis (6 – 23 September 1942)
- Delphin II (20 January – 9 February 1943)
- Rochen (9 – 26 February 1943)

== Summary of raiding history ==
Date	Ship	Nationality	Tonnage	Fate
31 December 1941	Cardita	United Kingdom	8,237	Sunk
17 January 1942	Nyholt	Norway	8,087	Sunk
16 June 1942	Cherokee	United States	5,896	Sunk
16 June 1942	Port Nicholson	United Kingdom	8,402	Sunk
11 October 1942	Agapenor	United Kingdom	7,392	Sunk

== Bibliography ==
- Blair, Clay (1996). Hitler's U-Boat War: The Hunters, 1939–1942. Random House. ISBN 0-394-58839-8.
- Blair, Clay (1998). Hitler's U-Boat War: The Hunted 1942–1945. Random House. ISBN 0-679-45742-9.
- Busch, Rainer; Röll, Hans-Joachim (1999). German U-boat commanders of World War II: a biographical dictionary. Translated by Brooks, Geoffrey. London, Annapolis, Md: Greenhill Books, Naval Institute Press. ISBN 1-55750-186-6.
- Busch, Rainer; Röll, Hans-Joachim (1999). Der U-Boot-Krieg, 1939-1945: Deutsche U-Boot-Verluste von September 1939 bis Mai 1945 [German U-boat losses from September 1939 to May 1945] (in German). Vol. IV. Hamburg, Berlin, Bonn: Mittler. ISBN 3-8132-0514-2.
- Gröner, Eric; Jung, Dieter; Maass, Martin (1991). German Warships 1815-1945: U-boats and Mine Warfare Vessels. Vol. 2. Translated by Thomas, Keith; Magowan, Rachel. London: Conway Maritime Press. ISBN 0-85177-593-4.
