= HMS Havelock (H88) =

British H-class destroyer

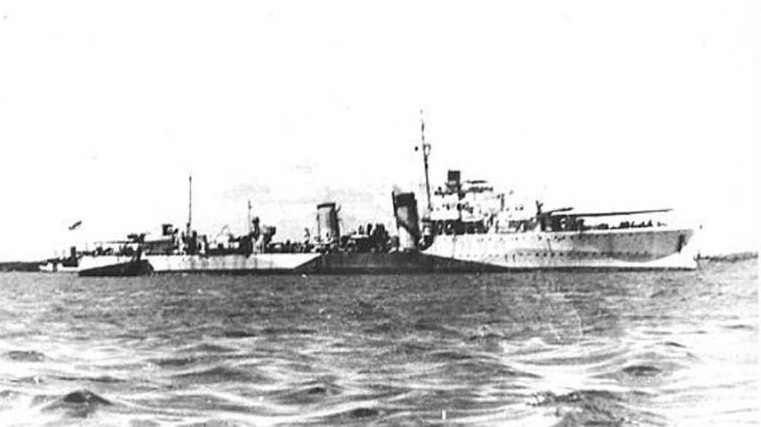
- Havelock in camouflage

History

Brazil
- Name: Jutahy
- Ordered: 8 December 1937
- Builder: J. Samuel White, Cowes
- Laid down: 30 March 1938
- Fate: Purchased by the United Kingdom, 5 September 1939

United Kingdom
- Name: HMS Havelock
- Launched: 16 October 1939
- Acquired: 5 September 1939
- Commissioned: 10 February 1940
- Identification: Pennant number: H88
- Fate: Scrapped, 31 October 1946

General characteristics (as built)
- Class & type: Brazilian H-class destroyer
- Displacement: 1,350 long tons (1,370 t) (standard); 1,883 long tons (1,913 t) (deep load)
- Length: 323 ft (98.5 m)
- Beam: 33 ft (10.1 m)
- Draught: 12 ft 5 in (3.8 m)
- Installed power: 34,000 shp (25,000 kW)
- Propulsion: 2 shafts; Parsons geared steam turbines; 3 Admiralty water-tube boilers
- Speed: 36 knots (67 km/h; 41 mph)
- Range: 5,530 nmi (10,240 km; 6,360 mi) at 15 knots (28 km/h; 17 mph)
- Complement: 152
- Sensors & processing systems: ASDIC
- Armament: 3 × 1 - QF 4.7-inch (120 mm) Mk IX guns; 2 × 4 - .50 cal machine guns; 2 × 4 - 21 inch (533 mm) torpedo tubes; 110 × depth charges, 3 rails and 8 throwers

HMS Havelock was an H-class destroyer that had originally been ordered by the Brazilian Navy with the name Jutahy in the late 1930s, but was bought by the Royal Navy after the beginning of the Second World War in September 1939 and later renamed. She participated in the Norwegian Campaign in May 1940 and was assigned to convoy escort and anti-submarine patrols with the Western Approaches Command afterwards. The ship was briefly assigned to Force H in 1941, but her anti-aircraft armament was deemed too weak and she rejoined Western Approaches Command. Havelock became flotilla leader of Escort Group B-5 of the Mid-Ocean Escort Force in early 1942 and continued to escort convoys in the North Atlantic for the next two years. The ship was converted to an escort destroyer and sank one submarine during the war. After the end of the war, she escorted the ships carrying the Norwegian government in exile back to Norway and served as a target ship through mid-1946. Havelock was scrapped beginning in late 1946.

== Description ==
Havelock displaced 1,350 long tons (1,370 t) at standard load and 1,883 long tons (1,913 t) at deep load. The ship had an overall length of 323 feet (98.5 m), a beam of 33 feet (10.1 m) and a draught of 12 feet 5 inches (3.8 m). She was powered by Parsons geared steam turbines, driving two shafts, which developed a total of 34,000 shaft horsepower (25,000 kW) and gave a maximum speed of 36 knots (67 km/h; 41 mph). Steam for the turbines was provided by three Admiralty 3-drum water-tube boilers. Havelock carried a maximum of 470 long tons (480 t) of fuel oil, giving her a range of 5,530 nautical miles (10,240 km; 6,360 mi) at 15 knots (28 km/h; 17 mph). The ship's complement was 152 officers and ratings.

The vessel was designed for four 45-calibre 4.7-inch Mk IX guns in single mounts, designated 'A', 'B', 'X', and 'Y' from front to rear, but 'Y' gun was removed to compensate for the additional depth charges added. For anti-aircraft (AA) defence, Havelock had two quadruple Mark I mounts for the 0.5 inch Vickers Mark III machine gun. She was fitted with two above-water quadruple torpedo tube mounts for 21-inch (533 mm) torpedoes. One depth charge rail and two throwers were originally fitted, but this was increased to three sets of rails and eight throwers while fitting-out. The ship's load of depth charges was increased from 20 to 110 as well.

Havelock was completed without a director-control tower (DCT) so the three remaining 4.7-inch low-angle guns fired in local control using ranges provided by a rangefinder. She was fitted with an ASDIC set to detect submarines by reflections from sound waves beamed into the water.

=== Wartime modifications ===
Havelock was fitted with a HF/DF radio direction finder before completion and she had her rear torpedo tubes replaced by a 12-pounder AA gun by October 1940. The ship's short-range AA armament was later augmented by two Oerlikon 20 mm guns on the wings of the ship's bridge and the .50-calibre machine gun mounts were replaced by a pair of Oerlikons. It is uncertain if the ship's director-control tower was installed before a Type 271 target indication radar was installed above the bridge. At some point, the ship was converted to an escort destroyer. 'A' gun was replaced by a Hedgehog anti-submarine spigot mortar and additional depth charge stowage replaced the 12-pounder high-angle gun. A Type 286 short-range surface search radar was fitted and the HF/DF installation was moved to a pole mainmast.

== History ==
Jutahy was ordered by Brazil on 8 December 1937 from J. Samuel White, Cowes. The ship was laid down on 31 May 1938 and was purchased by the British on 5 September 1939 after the beginning of the Second World War and renamed HMS Havelock. She was launched on 16 October and commissioned on 10 February 1940. After working up, the ship was assigned to the 9th Destroyer Flotilla of the Western Approaches Command. Havelock was detached to Home Fleet during the Norwegian Campaign and supported the Allied landings on 12–13 May at Bjerkvik during the Battle of Narvik. During the initial stages of this battle, she mounted a French mortar battery on her forecastle. She continued to provide fire support during the battle for the rest of the month. During the nights of 30 and 31 May, the ship helped to evacuate troops from Bodø to Harstad and Borkenes to await further evacuation. Havelock was one of the ships that escorted the troop ships evacuating the troops from the Narvik area on 7 and 8 June. She was commanded by Capt. E. Barry Stevens, DSC.

Later in June, the ship rejoined the 9th Destroyer Flotilla and spent most of the next two years escorting convoys. Late in 1940 the Flotilla was redesignated as the 9th Escort Group. Havelock was attached to Force H in Gibraltar to reinforce the escort during Operations Tiger in May 1941. The ship returned to the Western Approaches command afterwards as her anti-aircraft capability was believed by Admiral James Somerville to be too weak for operations in the Mediterranean.

In March 1942, Havelock became flotilla leader of Escort Group B-5 of the Mid-Ocean Escort Force and continued to escort convoys in the North Atlantic until early 1944. From 28 December to 14 January 1943, the escort group defended Convoy TM 1, a group of nine oil tankers sailing from Trinidad to Gibraltar. The convoy was attacked by several U-boat wolfpacks en route and lost seven of its ships. Havelock only managed to damage U-436 with depth charges whilst escorting this convoy. Havelock and her consorts escorted Convoy SC 122 through the largest convoy battle of the war some two months later. In mid-1943, the escort group was deployed to the Bay of Biscay to attack U-boats in cooperation with the Royal Air Force (RAF) as they left their bases on the French Atlantic coast. In late September to early October, the group escorted ships carrying 247 Group to the Azores to begin setting up airbases there.

In early 1944, Havelock was transferred to the 14th Escort Group which was given the task of protecting the convoys supporting Operation Overlord, the impending invasion of Western Europe, in British coastal waters, captained by Earl H. Thomas. Together with the destroyers Fame and Inconstant, the ship sank U-767 on 18 June. She was refitted in Liverpool from July to September and rejoined the group upon completion. Havelock was under repair again in February–April 1945, but they were completed by 30 April when the ship, together with her sister Hesperus, attacked the wreck of U-246 northwest of the island of Anglesey thinking that it was U-242 which had been spotted by a Short Sunderland flying boat earlier that day.

Two weeks later, Havelock and the 14th Escort Group escorted a group of surrendered German U-boats from Loch Alsh to Lough Foyle. On 27 May, the ship, together with Hesperus, escorted the exiled Norwegian government back to Oslo and remained there until 1 June. Later that month, she began service as an aircraft target, a role that lasted for the next year. The ship was approved for scrapping on 18 February 1946 and was placed in Category C reserve on 2 August. Havelock was sold on 31 October and scrapped at Inverkeithing.
