= German submarine U-463 =

German World War II submarine

Coordinates: 45°57′N 11°40′W

History

Nazi Germany
- Name: U-463
- Ordered: 15 August 1940
- Builder: Deutsche Werke, Kiel
- Yard number: 294
- Laid down: 8 March 1941
- Launched: 20 December 1941
- Commissioned: 2 April 1942
- Fate: Sunk on 16 May 1943

General characteristics
- Class & type: Type XIV ocean-going submarine tanker
- Displacement: 1,688 t (1,661 long tons) surfaced; 1,932 t (1,901 long tons) submerged
- Length: 67.10 m (220 ft 2 in) o/a; 48.51 m (159 ft 2 in) pressure hull
- Beam: 9.35 m (30 ft 8 in) o/a; 4.90 m (16 ft 1 in) pressure hull
- Height: 11.70 m (38 ft 5 in)
- Draught: 6.51 m (21 ft 4 in)
- Installed power: 2,800–3,200 PS (2,100–2,400 kW; 2,800–3,200 bhp) (diesels); 750 PS (550 kW; 740 shp) (electric)
- Propulsion: 2 shafts; 2 × diesel engines; 2 × electric motors
- Speed: 14.4–14.9 knots (26.7–27.6 km/h; 16.6–17.1 mph) surfaced; 6.2 knots (11.5 km/h; 7.1 mph) submerged
- Range: 12,350 nmi (22,870 km; 14,210 mi) at 10 knots (19 km/h; 12 mph) surfaced; 55 nmi (102 km; 63 mi) at 4 knots (7.4 km/h; 4.6 mph) submerged
- Test depth: 240 m (790 ft)
- Complement: 6 officers and 47 enlisted
- Armament: 2 × 3.7 cm (1.5 in) SK C/30 anti-aircraft guns; 1 × 2 cm (0.79 in) C/30 AA gun

Service record
- Part of: 4th U-boat Flotilla; 2 April – 31 July 1942; 10th U-boat Flotilla; 1 August – 31 October 1942; 12th U-boat Flotilla; 1 November 1942 – 16 May 1943
- Identification codes: M 41 387
- Commanders: K.Kapt. Leo Wolfbauer; 2 April 1942 – 16 May 1943
- Operations: 5 patrols: 1st patrol: 11 July – 3 September 1942; 2nd patrol: 28 September – 11 November 1942; 3rd patrol: 6 December 1942 – 26 January 1943; 4th patrol: 4 March – 17 April 1943; 5th patrol: 10 – 16 May 1943
- Victories: None

German submarine U-463 was a Type XIV supply and replenishment U-boat ("Milchkuh") of Nazi Germany's Kriegsmarine during World War II.

Her keel was laid down on 8 March 1941 by Deutsche Werke of Kiel. She was launched on 20 December 1941 and commissioned on 2 April 1942 with Korvettenkapitän Leo Wolfbauer in command. Wolfbauer remained in charge for the boat's entire career.

== Design ==
German Type XIV submarines were shortened versions of the Type IXDs they were based on. U-463 had a displacement of 1,688 tonnes (1,661 long tons) when at the surface and 1,932 tonnes (1,901 long tons) while submerged. The U-boat had a total length of 67.10 m (220 ft 2 in), a pressure hull length of 48.51 m (159 ft 2 in), a beam of 9.35 m (30 ft 8 in), a height of 11.70 m (38 ft 5 in), and a draught of 6.51 m (21 ft 4 in). The submarine was powered by two Germaniawerft supercharged four-stroke, six-cylinder diesel engines producing a total of 2,800–3,200 metric horsepower (2,060–2,350 kW; 2,760–3,160 shp) for use while surfaced, two Siemens-Schuckert 2 GU 345/38-8 double-acting electric motors producing a total of 750 metric horsepower (550 kW; 740 shp) for use while submerged. She had two shafts and two propellers. The boat was capable of operating at depths of up to 240 metres (790 ft).

The submarine had a maximum surface speed of 14.4–14.9 knots (26.7–27.6 km/h; 16.6–17.1 mph) and a maximum submerged speed of 6.2 knots (11.5 km/h; 7.1 mph). When submerged, the boat could operate for 120 nautical miles (220 km; 140 mi) at 2 knots (3.7 km/h; 2.3 mph); when surfaced, she could travel 12,350 nautical miles (22,870 km; 14,210 mi) at 10 knots (19 km/h; 12 mph). U-463 was not fitted with torpedo tubes or deck guns, but had two 3.7 cm (1.5 in) SK C/30 anti-aircraft guns with 2500 rounds as well as a 2 cm (0.79 in) C/30 guns with 3000 rounds. The boat had a complement of fifty-three.

== Operational career ==
U-463 conducted five patrols. As a supply boat, she avoided combat.

=== First patrol ===
U-463 departed Kiel on her first patrol on 11 July 1942, arriving at St. Nazaire in occupied France on 3 September. She had gone the 'long' way round the British Isles, by way of the gap between Iceland and the Faeroe Islands, heading out into mid-Atlantic toward the Caribbean.

=== Second, third and fourth patrols ===
Her second foray took her into the middle of the Atlantic again, between 28 September 1942 and 11 November.

The submarine's next sortie was further south, passing the Azores on the outward journey to the north and to the south on the return. By now she was based at St. Nazaire once more.

Another uneventful patrol began on 4 March 1943, but when the U-boat returned to France on 17 April, she moved into Bordeaux.

=== Fifth patrol and loss ===
U-463's fifth patrol began with her departure from Le Verdon, (north of Bordeaux): She had barely cleared the Bay of Biscay, when she was attacked and sunk on 16 May 1943 by depth charges dropped by a British Halifax from 58 Squadron RAF Coastal Command, piloted by Wing Commander Wilfrid Oulton. All 57 of her crew died.

=== Wolfpacks ===
U-463 took part in one wolfpack, namely:

- Delphin (11 – 14 January 1943)

== Bibliography ==
- Busch, Rainer; Röll, Hans-Joachim (1999). German U-boat commanders of World War II : a biographical dictionary. Translated by Brooks, Geoffrey. London, Annapolis, Md: Greenhill Books, Naval Institute Press. ISBN 1-55750-186-6.
- Busch, Rainer; Röll, Hans-Joachim (1999). Deutsche U-Boot-Verluste von September 1939 bis Mai 1945 [German U-boat losses from September 1939 to May 1945]. Der U-Boot-Krieg (in German). Vol. IV. Hamburg, Berlin, Bonn: Mittler. ISBN 3-8132-0514-2.
- Edwards, Bernard (1996). Dönitz and the Wolf Packs – The U-boats at War. Cassell Military Classics. p. 178. ISBN 0-304-35203-9.
- Gröner, Erich; Jung, Dieter; Maass, Martin (1991). U-boats and Mine Warfare Vessels. German Warships 1815–1945. Vol. 2. Translated by Thomas, Keith; Magowan, Rachel. London: Conway Maritime Press. ISBN 0-85177-593-4.
