= German submarine U-436 =

German World War II submarine

History

Nazi Germany
- Name: U-436
- Ordered: 16 October 1939
- Builder: Schichau-Werke, Danzig
- Yard number: 1478
- Laid down: 25 April 1940
- Launched: 21 June 1941
- Commissioned: 27 September 1941
- Fate: Sunk on 26 May 1943

General characteristics
- Class & type: Type VIIC submarine
- Displacement: 769 tonnes (757 long tons) surfaced; 871 t (857 long tons) submerged
- Length: 67.10 m (220 ft 2 in) o/a; 50.50 m (165 ft 8 in) pressure hull
- Beam: 6.20 m (20 ft 4 in) o/a; 4.70 m (15 ft 5 in) pressure hull
- Height: 9.60 m (31 ft 6 in)
- Draught: 4.74 m (15 ft 7 in)
- Installed power: 2,800–3,200 PS (2,100–2,400 kW; 2,800–3,200 bhp) (diesels); 750 PS (550 kW; 740 shp) (electric)
- Propulsion: 2 shafts; 2 × diesel engines; 2 × electric motors
- Speed: 17.7 knots (32.8 km/h; 20.4 mph) surfaced; 7.6 knots (14.1 km/h; 8.7 mph) submerged
- Range: 8,500 nmi (15,700 km; 9,800 mi) at 10 knots (19 km/h; 12 mph) surfaced; 80 nmi (150 km; 92 mi) at 4 knots (7.4 km/h; 4.6 mph) submerged
- Test depth: 230 m (750 ft); Crush depth: 250–295 m (820–968 ft)
- Complement: 4 officers, 40–56 enlisted
- Armament: 5 × 53.3 cm (21 in) torpedo tubes (four bow, one stern); 14 × torpedoes; 1 × 8.8 cm (3.46 in) deck gun (220 rounds); 1 x 2 cm (0.79 in) C/30 AA gun

Service record
- Part of: 5th U-boat Flotilla; 27 September 1941 – 31 January 1942; 7th U-boat Flotilla; 1 February – 30 June 1942; 11th U-boat Flotilla; 1 July – 31 August 1942; 6th U-boat Flotilla; 1 September 1942 – 26 May 1943
- Identification codes: M 17 108
- Commanders: Kptlt. Günther Seibicke; 27 September 1941 – 26 May 1943
- Operations: 8 patrols: 1st patrol: 2 – 17 February 1942; 2nd patrol: 26 February – 24 March 1942; 3rd patrol: 7 – 20 April 1942; 4th patrol: 29 April – 4 May 1942; 5th patrol: a. 12 – 27 May 1942; b. 30 May – 1 June 1942; c. 7 – 11 June 1942; d. 12 – 13 June 1942; e. 20 – 21 September 1942; 6th patrol: 6 October – 12 November 1942; 7th patrol: 17 December 1942 – 19 February 1943; 8th patrol: 25 April – 26 May 1943
- Victories: 6 merchant ships sunk (36,208 GRT); 1 warship sunk (291 tons); 2 merchant ships damaged (15,575 GRT)

German submarine U-436 was a Type VIIC U-boat of Nazi Germany's Kriegsmarine during World War II.

She carried out eight patrols.

She sank seven ships, total 36,208 gross register tons (GRT) and 291 tons; Two ships were damaged, totalling 15,575 GRT.

She was a member of ten wolfpacks.

She was sunk by Allied warships in mid-Atlantic on 26 May 1943.

== Design ==
German Type VIIC submarines were preceded by the shorter Type VIIB submarines. U-436 had a displacement of 769 tonnes (757 long tons) when at the surface and 871 tonnes (857 long tons) while submerged. She had a total length of 67.10 m (220 ft 2 in), a pressure hull length of 50.50 m (165 ft 8 in), a beam of 6.20 m (20 ft 4 in), a height of 9.60 m (31 ft 6 in), and a draught of 4.74 m (15 ft 7 in). The submarine was powered by two Germaniawerft F46 four-stroke, six-cylinder supercharged diesel engines producing a total of 2,800 to 3,200 metric horsepower (2,060 to 2,350 kW; 2,760 to 3,160 shp) for use while surfaced, two AEG GU 460/8–27 double-acting electric motors producing a total of 750 metric horsepower (550 kW; 740 shp) for use while submerged. She had two shafts and two 1.23 m (4 ft) propellers. The boat was capable of operating at depths of up to 230 metres (750 ft).

The submarine had a maximum surface speed of 17.7 knots (32.8 km/h; 20.4 mph) and a maximum submerged speed of 7.6 knots (14.1 km/h; 8.7 mph). When submerged, the boat could operate for 80 nautical miles (150 km; 92 mi) at 4 knots (7.4 km/h; 4.6 mph); when surfaced, she could travel 8,500 nautical miles (15,700 km; 9,800 mi) at 10 knots (19 km/h; 12 mph). U-436 was fitted with five 53.3 cm (21 in) torpedo tubes (four fitted at the bow and one at the stern), fourteen torpedoes, one 8.8 cm (3.46 in) SK C/35 naval gun, 220 rounds, and a 2 cm (0.79 in) C/30 anti-aircraft gun. The boat had a complement of between forty-four and sixty.

== Service history ==
The submarine was laid down on 25 April 1940 at Schichau-Werke in Danzig (now Gdansk, Poland) as yard number 1478, launched on 21 June 1941 and commissioned on 27 September 1941 under the command of Kapitänleutnant Günther Seibicke.

She served with the 5th U-boat Flotilla from 27 September 1941 for training and the 7th flotilla from 1 February 1942 for operations. She was reassigned, first to the 11th flotilla on 1 July, then the 6th flotilla on 1 September.

=== First patrol ===
U-436's first patrol was from Kiel in Germany and took in the Norwegian and Barents Seas. She docked at Kirkenes, not far from the border between Norway and the Soviet Union on 17 February 1942.

=== Second and third patrols ===
The boat's initial success came when she sank the Soviet trawler RT-19 Komitern on 1 March 1942 east of Murmansk.

The submarine's third sortie commenced with her departure from Kirkenes on 7 April 1942. On the 13th, she sank the Soviet Kiev north of the North Cape. The vessel went down in seven minutes.

=== Fourth and fifth patrols ===
U-436 carried out her fourth and fifth patrols from Kirkenes and Trondheim. They were followed by a series of journeys which were not recognized as patrols. At their end, she was back in Kiel.

=== Sixth patrol ===
The U-boat left Kiel once more on 6 October 1942, but this time she was headed for the Atlantic Ocean, via the gap separating the Faroe and Shetland Islands.

On the 27th, she torpedoed, but did not sink, the Norwegian Frontenac in mid-Atlantic. The ship's bow section was badly damaged, so much so that her propeller was raised out of the water. The accompanying fire was extinguished by a large wave; the ship was pumped out and she was capable of moving under her own power. During the same attack, she sank the Sourabaya. Also lost was the landing craft HMS LCT-2281 which had been carried on deck. Two days later, the boat sank the Barrwhinn.

She arrived at Lorient in occupied France on 12 November.

=== Seventh patrol ===
Patrol number seven saw U-436 sink the Albert L. Ellsworth south of the Azores on 8 January 1943. The ship had been abandoned after being hit by a torpedo but remained afloat. The wreck was sunk by gunfire from the U-boat the following evening.

=== Eighth patrol and loss ===
By now based at St. Nazaire, she left the French port on 25 April 1943. On 26 May 1943 she was attacked and sunk west of Cape Ortegal in northwest Spain by depth charges from the frigate HMS Test and the corvette HMS Hyderabad.

Forty-seven men went down with U-436; there were no survivors.

=== Wolfpacks ===
U-436 took part in ten wolfpacks, namely:

- Umbau (7 – 16 February 1942)
- Umhang (10 – 16 March 1942)
- Robbenschlag (7 – 14 April 1942)
- Blutrausch (15 – 19 April 1942)
- Strauchritter (29 April – 1 May 1942)
- Greif (14 – 26 May 1942)
- Puma (16 – 29 October 1942)
- Natter (30 October – 6 November 1942)
- Delphin (26 December 1942 – 12 February 1943)
- Drossel (29 April – 15 May 1943)

== Summary of raiding history ==
Date	Ship Name	Nationality	Tonnage (Note: Merchant ship tonnages are in gross register tons. Military vessels are listed by tons displacement.)	Fate
1 March 1942	RT-19 Komintern	Soviet Union	577	Sunk
13 April 1942	Kiev	Soviet Union	5,823	Sunk
27 October 1942	Frontenac	Norway	7,350	Damaged
27 October 1942	Gurney E. Newlin	United States	8,225	Damaged
27 October 1942	Sourabaya	United Kingdom	10,107	Sunk
27 October 1942	HMS LCT-2281 (Note: Carried by Sourabaya.)	Royal Navy	291	Sunk
29 October 1942	Barrwhin	United Kingdom	4,998	Sunk
8 January 1943	Albert L. Ellsworth	Norway	8,309	Sunk
8 January 1943	Oltenia II	United Kingdom	6,394	Sunk

== Bibliography ==
- Busch, Rainer; Röll, Hans-Joachim (1999). German U-boat commanders of World War II : a biographical dictionary. Translated by Brooks, Geoffrey. London, Annapolis, Md: Greenhill Books, Naval Institute Press. ISBN 1-55750-186-6.
- Busch, Rainer; Röll, Hans-Joachim (1999). Deutsche U-Boot-Verluste von September 1939 bis Mai 1945 [German U-boat losses from September 1939 to May 1945]. Der U-Boot-Krieg (in German). Vol. IV. Hamburg, Berlin, Bonn: Mittler. ISBN 3-8132-0514-2.
- Gröner, Erich; Jung, Dieter; Maass, Martin (1991). U-boats and Mine Warfare Vessels. German Warships 1815–1945. Vol. 2. Translated by Thomas, Keith; Magowan, Rachel. London: Conway Maritime Press. ISBN 0-85177-593-4.
- Kemp, Paul (1999). U-Boats Destroyed – German Submarine Losses in the World Wars. London: Arms & Armour. ISBN 1-85409-515-3.
