= Convoy RS 3 =

Battle of the Atlantic South Atlantic convoy

- Part of the Battle of the Atlantic
- North Atlantic ocean showing the west African coast
Date	22–31 March 1943
Location	South-east of the Canary Islands
Result	German victory

Belligerents
Germany	United States; United Kingdom

Commanders and leaders
Karl Dönitz	Harold Milne

Strength
7 U-boats	1 Sloop; 1 Corvette; 3 Merchant ships; 1 Cable layer; 4 Seagoing tugs

Casualties and losses
	3 Merchant ships

Convoy RS 3 was a South Atlantic convoy from 22 to 31 March 1943 between Gibraltar and Freetown in Sierra Leone. A convoy series that ran from 1943 to 1945. The convoy was part of the Battle of the Atlantic in the Second World War. The convoy lost its three biggest ships to U-boat attacks.

In March 1943 most of the 108 ships (627,000 GRT) sunk by U-boats were in convoy, that led to a crisis in Allied shipping. By April, more escort groups were available and shipping losses declined. Some U-boats were diverted from the Atlantic to West Africa.

== Background ==
=== Kriegsmarine ===
Map of the Canary Islands (circled in red)

Wolfpack Unverzagt (Unshrinking) and Wolfpack Wohlgemut (Cheerful) were on the way to form patrol lines off the Azores to attack a UGS convoy (United States to Gibraltar Slow) a series of slow convoys run from the United States to Gibraltar beginning with Operation Torch (8–16 November 1942). The convoy had been revealed by B-Dienst, a code-breaking department of the German Naval Intelligence Service (Marinenachrichtendienst [MND]). (Note: Unverzagt: U-106, U-130, U-167, U-172, U-513 and U-515. Wohlgemut: U-67, U-103, U-109, U-159 and U-534.)

==== Convoy UGS 6 ====
Before the expected convoy was spotted, U-130 found Convoy UGS 6 of 45 ships, protected by the US destroyers Wainwright, Trippe, Champlin, Mayrant, Rowan, Rhind and Hobby. Champlin detected the U-boat and sank it. With the sea so calm, it was difficult for the U-boats to close on the convoy because the destroyers had centimetric radar but lacked High-frequency direction finding (huff-duff) to pinpoint U-boat wireless broadcasts. Late on 13 March, U-172 sank SS Benjamin Harrison (7,191 GRT) a straggler and Wolfpack Tümmler (Porpoise) joined the attack. (Note: Tümmler (Porpoise): U-43, U-66, U-202, U-504, U-521 and U-558.)

That day, attacks by U-513, U-167 and U-172 were defeated by the convoy escorts and the U-boats were forced to retire. On 14 September U-106, U-167 and U-513 were driven off and U-515 was damaged by depth charging. On 15 March U-159 and U-524 attacked the convoy submerged in daylight and U-524 sank Wyoming (8,062 GRT). On 16 March U-106 directed nine U-boats to the convoy but the escorts thwarted their attempts to attack the convoy. U-524, with U-172, made a simultaneous submerged attack in the evening. On the evening of 17 March U-167 torpedoed Molly Pitcher (7,200 GRT) which was sunk later by U-521.

=== Allied air cover ===
On the next day, the convoy received air cover; U-524 maintained contact but was unable to attack and the convoy operation was terminated. U-524 was caught on the surface and sunk by the depth-charges of a B-24 bomber from the 2nd Antisubmarine Squadron on 22 March. Karl Dönitz the commander of U-boats (Befehlshaber der U-Boote, BdU) sent the remaining seven U-boats to form a cordon from the west to the south-east of the Canary Islands to attack another UGS convoy. No UGS convoys were found and BdU moved the U-boats into the area between the African coast and the islands, along with U-123 that was en route to Freetown in Sierra Leone with the name gruppe Seeräuber (Pirate) based on reports from B-Dienst. The US Navy had established Fleet Air Wing 15 at Naval Air Station Port Lyautey in Morocco, in January, with the patrol squadrons VPB-73 and VPB-92, each with twelve Catalina flying boats. In March the United States Army Air Forces (USAAF) 1st Antisubmarine Squadron and the 2nd Antisubmarine Squadron of the 2037th Antisubmarine Wing (Provisional) with twelve B-24 Liberator bombers each, joined the naval aircraft at Port Lyautey.

=== Convoy RS 3 ===
Sierra Leone, the destination of Convoy RS 3

The RS convoy series ran from Gibraltar to Freetown in Sierra Leone during 1943, the reciprocal SR convoys from 1943 to 1944. When Convoy RS 3 left Gibraltar for Freetown, it consisted of the merchant ships SS Lagosian, SS Moanda, MV Silverbeech, the cable layer SS Lady Denison-Pender, whose captain, Harold Milne, was the convoy commodore, the tugs HMS Alligator, HMS Crocodile, the Seagoing Tugs ST Empire Ace and ST Empire Oberon. Lady Denison-Pender was returning after laying a cable between Gibraltar and Casablanca for communications at the Casablanca Conference. The convoy was escorted by the Bridgewater-class sloop HMS Bridgewater and the Flower-class corvette HMS Burdock.

== Prelude ==
U-513 made contact with the convoy on 28 March between the Canary Islands and Dakar. The Allied commanders did not know that the convoy was in danger and on the morning of 28 March, the convoy escorts Bridgewater and Burdock were diverted to reinforce the escort of a northbound convoy, leaving Convoy RS 3 to aircraft anti-submarine patrols.

== 28–30 March ==
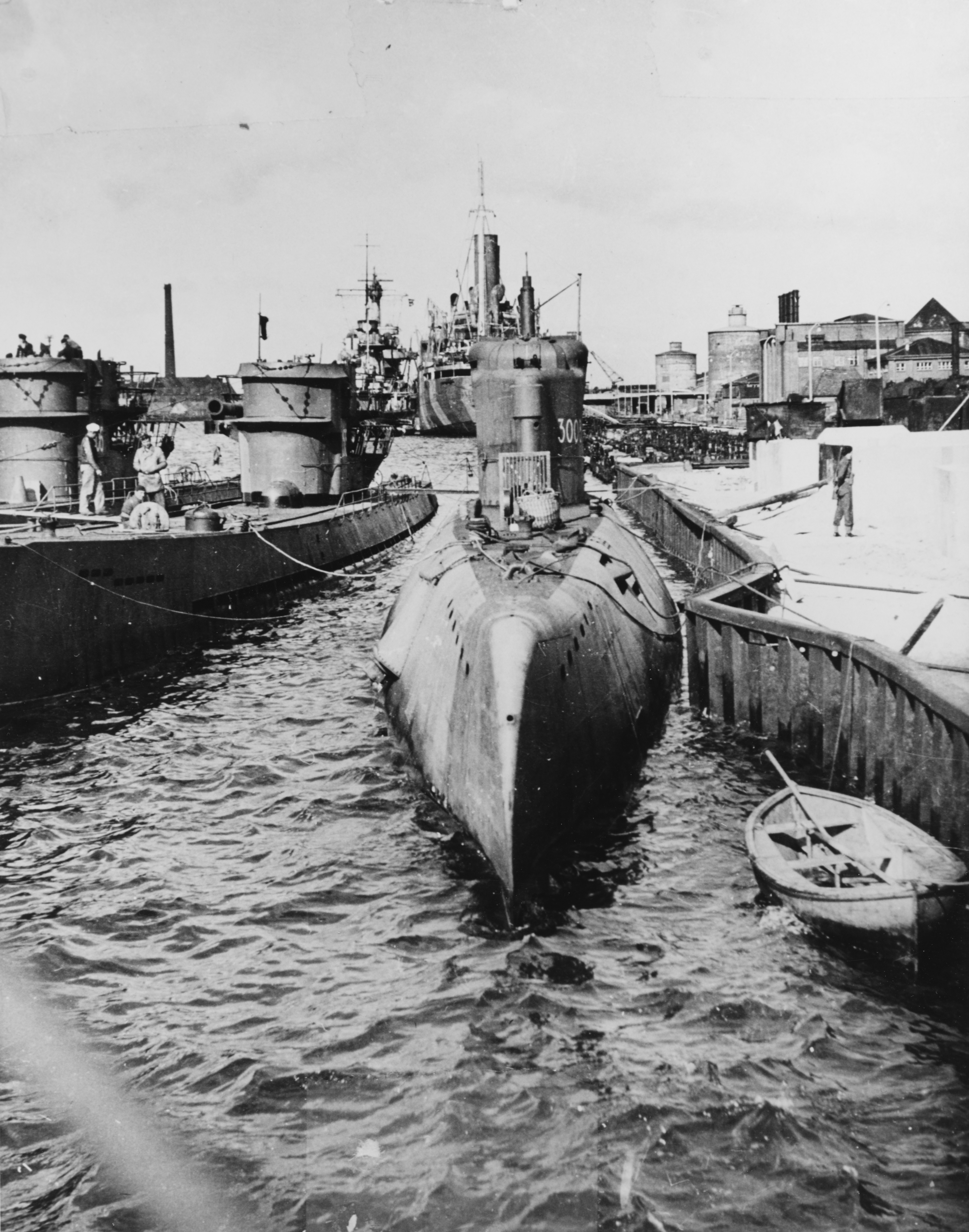
Example of a Type IX U-boat, photographed later in the war

Shortly after the escorts left, U-159 attacked and torpedoed the 5,414 GRT, SS Lagosian at 31°12′N, 15°43′W, with seven crew killed and 39 survivors. The ship broke amidships and sank within seven minutes. Eleven survivors were rescued by the tug Empire Denis. The convoy started zig-zagging and tried to increase speed but the tugs could not keep up and speed was reduced to seven kn (13 km/h; 8.1 mph). At 15:00 U-172 torpedoed the 5,311 GRT Silverbeech which exploded and sank at 25°20′N, 15°55′W with 62 killed and 7 survivors. As the ships were in shallow waters, the convoy commodore was not sure whether they should run into a protective coastal minefield or fight the U-boats. A few minutes later U-172 launched a salvo of four torpedoes that missed. As night fell at 20:00 the convoy stopped zig-zagging.

U-172 caught up with the convoy and its first attack with one torpedo missed but then U-167 torpedoed MV Moanda (4,511 GRT) with a second attack with two torpedoes. The ship sank at 02:00 the next morning at 24°44′N, 16°48′W with 29 killed and 27 survivors. Aircraft on convoy patrol attacked the U-boats and U-67 was sent out of control by a depth-charge attack, descending to 750 ft (230 m) before the crew regained control. After surfacing the crew found that six torpedo containers on deck and much of the superstructure were missing. U-159 was forced by air attack 698 ft (213 m) below the surface before the crew got the boat back under control. U-172 stayed with U-67 while it was inspected; when it was judged capable of returning to base its captain gave surplus fuel to U-515, which took over the patrol to Dakar instead of U-159 that was diverted to a quiet spot off the Azores. On 29 March the U-boats lost contact and the attack was abandoned on 30 March when the convoy reached Freetown.

== Aftermath ==
=== Analysis ===
March was a good month for the U-boat arm, Convoy SC 121 lost 13 ships from 7 to 11 March for no U-boat losses. Convoy SC 122 and Convoy HX 229 were attacked by forty U-boats and from 16 to 20 March, 21 freighters were sunk. With losses elsewhere 108 Allied merchant ships of 627,000 GRT were sunk. By the end of the month support groups became operational and despite more determined attacks by the U-boats, shipping losses declined. U-boats were sent to west Africa, one boat sinking seven of nine ships in Convoy TS 37, a Takoradi−Sierra Leone convoy. Convoy HX 233 (from Halifax Nova Scotia) was sent by a more southerly route to Britain with a large escort and only one ship was sunk.

=== Casualties ===
The crew of Lagosian suffered seven killed of 46 men, 63 of the 69 crew members of Silverbeech were killed and the loss of Moanda cost 29 killed with 27 survivors.

=== Subsequent operations ===
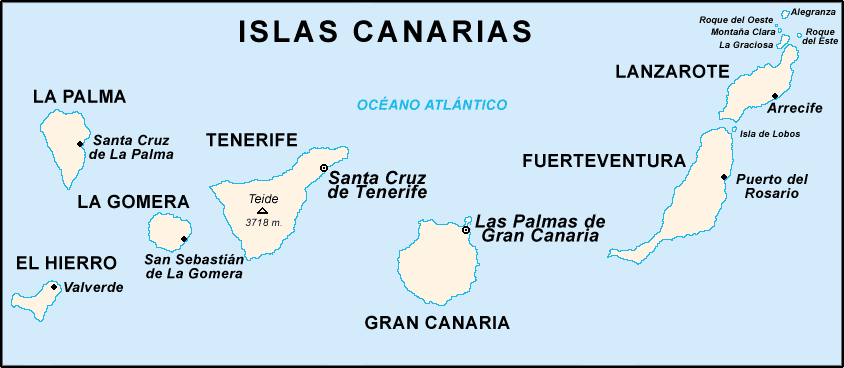
Map of the Canary Islands, showing Gran Canaria, centre

After gruppe Seeraüber was disbanded on 30 March, the U-boats operated individually off Freetown. U-124 attacked Convoy OS 45 on 2 April and sank two ships of 9,547 GRT but was then sunk by the 37th Escort Group. U-167 was attacked on 6 April by two Hudsons of 233 Squadron from Gibraltar and was scuttled after the crew disembarked, about fifty of the men getting ashore on Gran Canaria. After much diplomatic haggling, the survivors were released and transported on a tug on the night of 13/14 April to a rendezvous with U-455, some later to be accommodated in U-159 and U-518 for the return to France. An Italian U-boat, Giuseppe Finzi, sank two independently sailing ships of a total of 9,264 GRT. U-455 and U-117 planted mines off Casablanca on 10 and 11 April, that sank one ship and damaged two. The rest of the U-boats reached Freetown in early April.

== Allied order of battle ==
=== Convoyed ships ===
Merchant ships
Ship	Year	Flag	GRT	Notes
HMS Alligator	1941	Royal Navy	395	Seagoing tug
HMS Crocodile	1940	Royal Navy	395	Seagoing tug
ST Empire Ace	1942	United Kingdom	275	Ministry of War Transport tug
ST Empire Oberon	1943	United Kingdom	244	Ministry of War Transport tug
SS Lady Denison-Pender	1920	United Kingdom	1,984	Cable layer
SS Lagosian	1930	United Kingdom	5,412	Sunk, 28 March, U-159, 25°33′N, 15°43′W, 7† 39 saved
MV Moanda	1937	Belgium	4,621	Sunk 28 March, U-167, 24°44′N, 16°48°W, 29† 27 saved
MV Silverbeech	1926	United Kingdom	5,319	Sunk, 28 March, U-172, 25°20′N, 15°55′W, 62† 7 saved

=== Convoy escorts ===
Escorts
Name	Navy	Class	Notes
HMS Bridgewater	Royal Navy	Bridgewater-class sloop	
HMS Burdock	Royal Navy	Flower-class corvette	

== Kriegsmarine order of battle ==
=== Gruppe Seeraüber ===
gruppe Seeraüber
Name	Flag	Type	Notes
U-67	Kriegsmarine	Type IXC submarine	
U-123	Kriegsmarine	Type IXB submarine	
U-159	Kriegsmarine	Type IXC submarine	
U-167	Kriegsmarine	Type IXC/40 submarine	
U-172	Kriegsmarine	Type IXC submarine	
U-513	Kriegsmarine	Type IXC submarine	
U-515	Kriegsmarine	Type IXC submarine	
U-524	Kriegsmarine	Type IXC submarine	Sunk 22 March

=== Gruppe Unverzagt ===
gruppe Unverzagt
Name	Flag	Type	Notes
U-106	Kriegsmarine	Type IXB submarine	
U-130	Kriegsmarine	Type IXC submarine	
U-167	Kriegsmarine	Type IXC/40 submarine	
U-172	Kriegsmarine	Type IXC submarine	
U-513	Kriegsmarine	Type IXC submarine	
U-515	Kriegsmarine	Type IXC submarine	

=== Gruppe Wohlgemut ===
gruppe Wohlgemut
Name	Flag	Type	Notes
U-67	Kriegsmarine	Type IXC submarine	
U-103	Kriegsmarine	Type IXB submarine	
U-109	Kriegsmarine	Type IXB submarine	
U-159	Kriegsmarine	Type IXC submarine	
U-534	Kriegsmarine	Type IXC/40	

=== Gruppe Tümmler ===
gruppe Tümmler
Name	Flag	Type	Notes
U-43	Kriegsmarine	Type IX submarine	
U-66	Kriegsmarine	Type IXC submarine	
U-202	Kriegsmarine	Type VIIC submarine	
U-504	Kriegsmarine	Type IXC submarine	
U-521	Kriegsmarine	Type IXC submarine	
U-558	Kriegsmarine	Type VIIC submarine	

== Regia Marina order of battle ==
=== Submarines ===
Giuseppe Finzi
Name	Flag	Type	Notes
Giuseppe Finzi	Regia Marina	Calvi-class submarine	Sank Granicos and Celtic Star

=== Ships sunk by Giuseppe Finzi ===
Merchant ships
Ship	Year	Flag	GRT	Notes
SS Celtic Star	1918	United Kingdom	5,575	Sunk 29 March, 04°16′N, 17°44′W, 2†, 1 pow, 63 saved
SS Granicos	1916	Greece	3,689	Sunk 28 March, 02°N, 15°30′W, 30†, 1 pow, 1 saved

== Bibliography ==
- Allen, Tony (2018). "SS Granicos". Wrecksite.
- Blair, Clay (2000) [1998]. Hitler's U-Boat War: The Hunted 1942–1945. Vol. II (pbk. repr. ed.). London: Cassell. ISBN 0-304-35261-6.
- Hague, Arnold (2000). The Allied Convoy System 1939–1945: Its Organisation, Defence and Operation. London: Chatham. ISBN 1-86176-147-3.
- Jordan, Roger W. (2006) [1999]. The World's Merchant Fleets 1939: The Particulars and Wartime Fates of 6,000 Ships (2nd ed.). London: Chatham/Lionel Leventhal. ISBN 978-1-86176-293-1.
- Kindell, Don (2024). "Convoy RS.3". Arnold Hague Convoy Database: Shorter Convoy Series.
- Machielsen, Roger (1991). De Belgische koopvaardij in de Tweede Wereldoorlog [Belgian Merchant Shipping during the Second World War] (in Dutch). Antwerpen: Pattyn, Veurne. ISBN 90-74023-01-0.
- Rohwer, Jürgen; Hümmelchen, Gerhard (2005) [1972]. Chronology of the War at Sea, 1939–1945: The Naval History of World War Two (3rd rev. ed.). London: Chatham Publishing. ISBN 1-86176-257-7.
- Roskill, Stephen (1998) [1960]. The Navy at War 1939–1945 (pbk. facs. repr. Wordsworth Editions, Ware ed.). London: Collins. ISBN 978-1-85-326697-3.
