= Convoy TS 37 =

South Atlantic convoy

Convoy TS.37
- Part of World War II
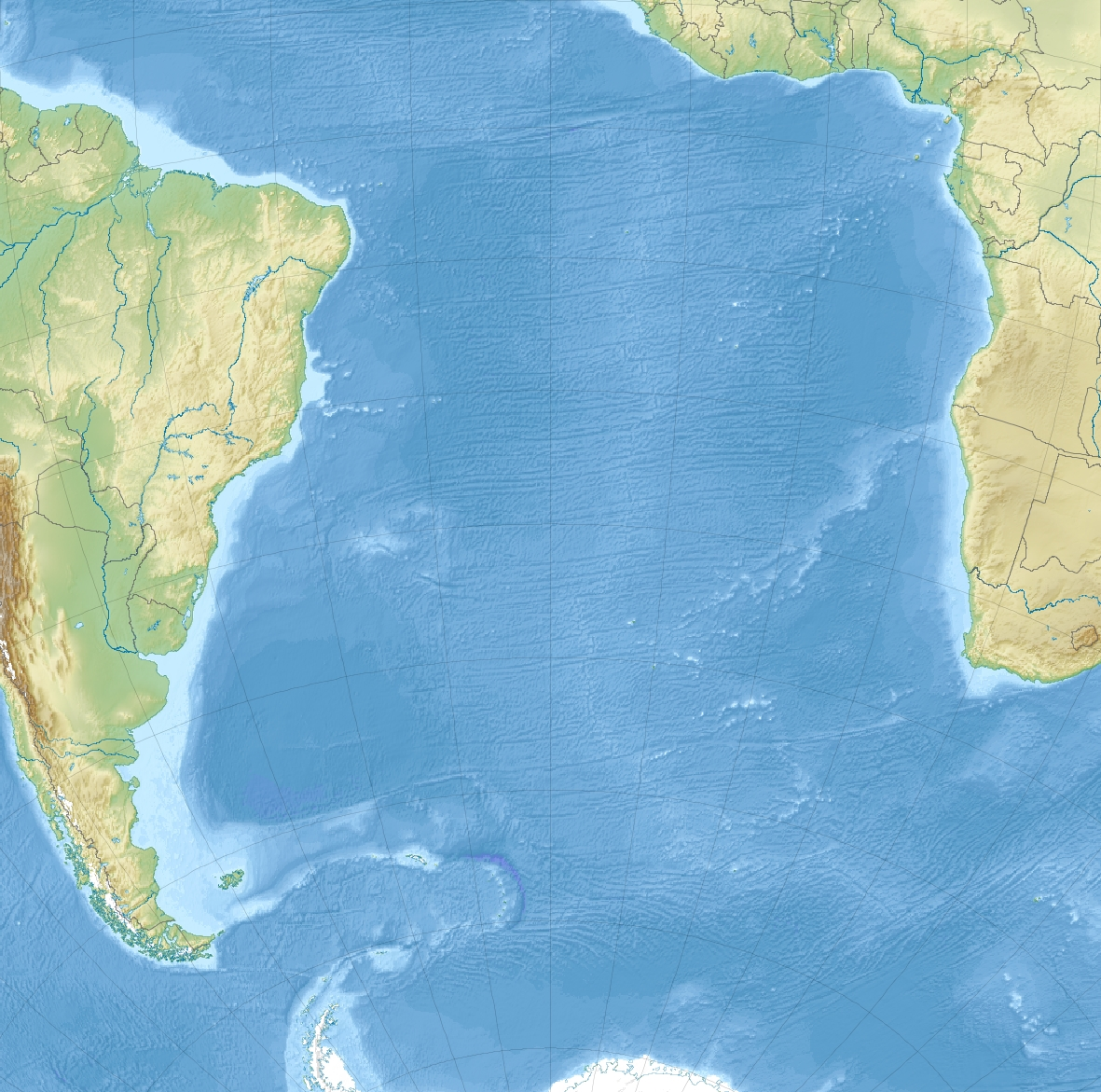
- The South Atlantic Ocean
Date	30 April – 1 May 1943
Location	South Atlantic
Result	German victory

Belligerents
Germany	United Kingdom

Commanders and leaders
Karl Dönitz; Werner Henke	Frank Pegram; Norman Gill

Strength
1 U-boat	19 merchant ships; 4 escorts; 3 destroyers

Casualties and losses
Nil	22 killed; 7 ships sunk

Convoy TS 37 was a South Atlantic convoy from 30 April – 1 May 1943. The TS series ran during the Second World War from Takoradi in Ghana to Freetown in Sierra Leone. The convoy route was a milk run and Convoy TS 37 had to make do with four small escort ships and relays of aircraft from the airfields along the West African coast.

Storms blew up during the late afternoon; the convoy patrol aircraft had to turn back and the overnight convoy patrol aircraft was cancelled because of the storms and a moonless night. Towards night on 29 April the German submarine U-515 spotted the convoy, got inside the columns of ships, from where it fired a salvo of two torpedoes from the stern tubes and missed. The captain Werner Henke fired four torpedoes from the forward tubes that which hit and sank four ships. One of the escorts attacked the U-boat but it escaped.

The U-boat crew reloaded three of the forward tubes, got back into the convoy and sank another three ships. Three destroyers were sent to reinforce the convoy escorts but arrived too late and were only able to take part in the rescue operation. Twenty-two men were killed in the sinkings or in the water but the rest survived. U-515 returned to Germany after a patrol of 124 days, Henke was awarded Oak Leaves to his Knight's Cross.

In London, the Prime Minister, Winston Churchill, wanted an explanation for the disaster and was told that the air escort was thwarted by stormy weather and the Admiralty explained that 743 ships had made the voyage without loss before convoy TS 37 and that when the Germans attacked in areas that had been free from attack, losses were unavoidable. German U-boats in the area had no more success.

== Background ==
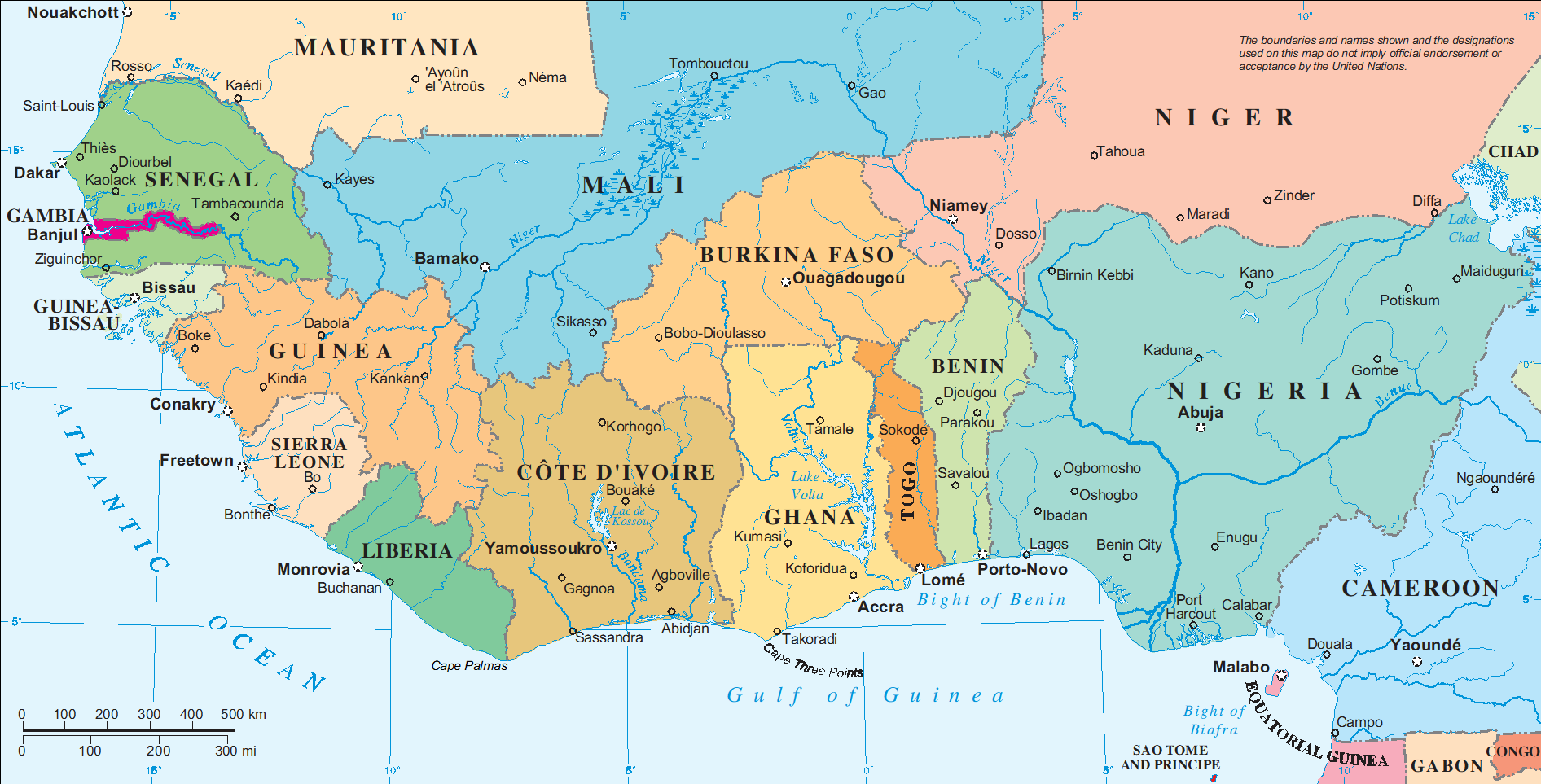
Map showing Takoradi in Ghana and Freetown in Sierra Leone

=== West Africa convoys ===
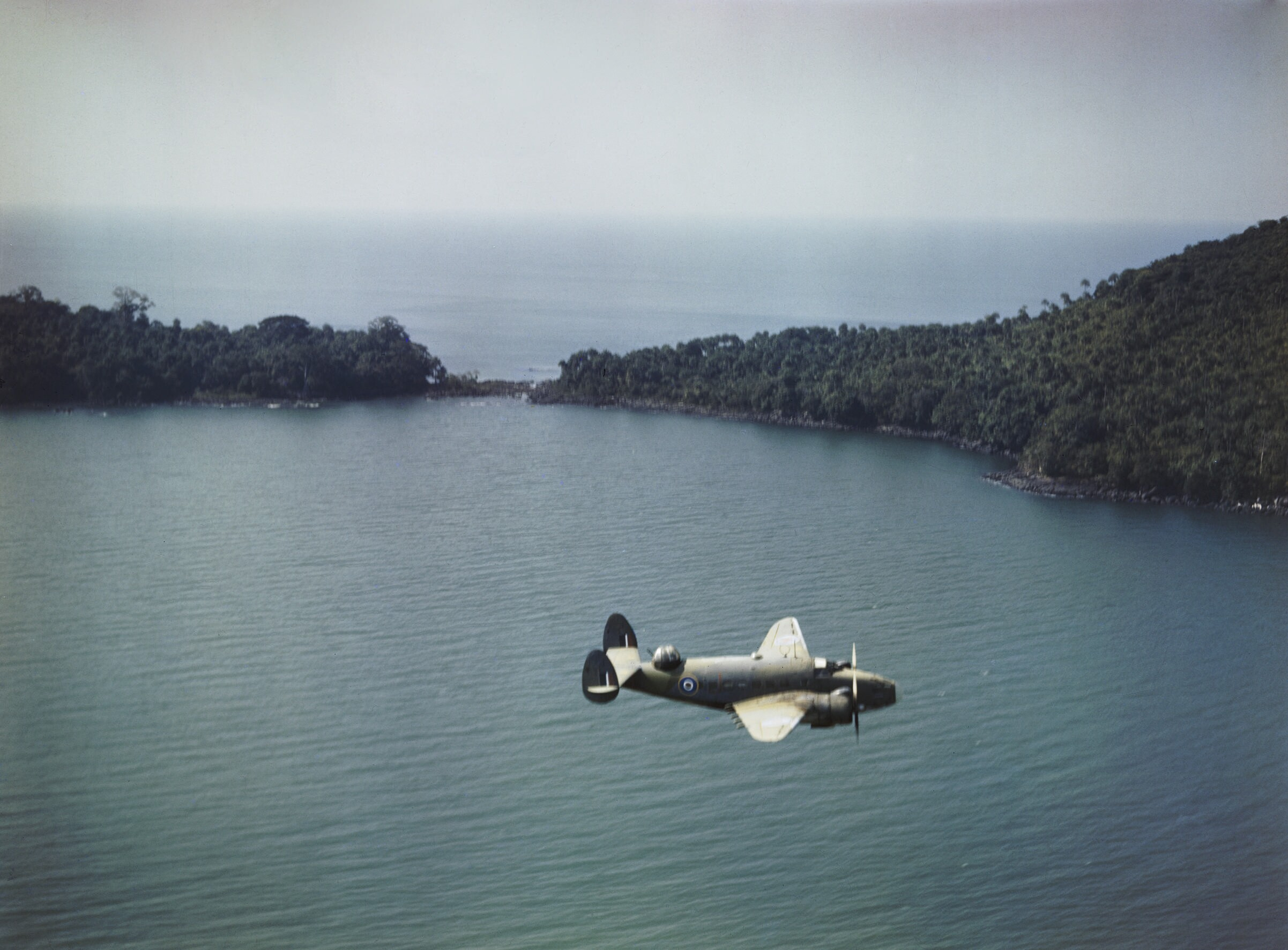
An RAF Hudson J-Jig of 200 Squadron based in The Gambia, March 1943

Convoy TS 37 was part of the TS–ST series, organised to protect merchant traffic between Takoradi on the Gold Coast (now Ghana) in the Gulf of Guinea and Freetown, Sierra Leone. Freetown was the main naval base for the Flag Officer, West Africa and was the departure and dispersal point for SL and OS convoys to Britain. The TS series had been established in September 1942 against U-boat attacks on independently routed shipping off the coast of West Africa.

The Flag Officer, Vice-Admiral Frank Pegram, relied on the aircraft of Air Headquarters West Africa based along the route, to supplement the few escort ships available for the route. A squadron of Hudson maritime reconnaissance aircraft and two of Sunderland flying boats were based at Bathurst (now Banjul in The Gambia), a squadron of Catalinas at Freetown and a flight of Wellington bombers at Takoradi, there were detachments of Hudsons at Port-Étienne (now Nouadhibou, Mauritania) and Lagos in Nigeria.

== Prelude ==
=== Convoy TS 37 ===
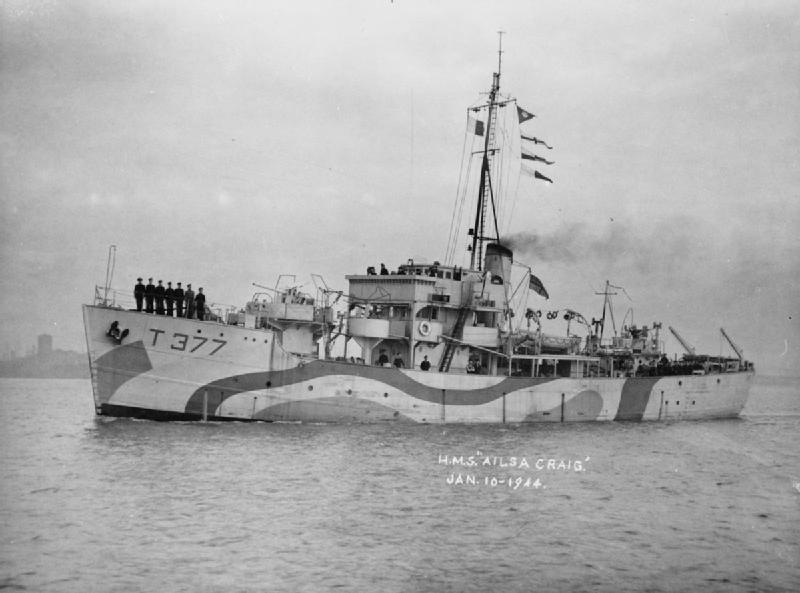
HMT Ailsa Craig, an example of an Isles-class trawler like HMT Arran

The convoy comprised 19 merchant ships, escorted by HMS Bellwort, a Flower-class corvette and the ASW trawlers, HMT Arran, Birdlip and Fandango. The Senior Officer (Escort) was Lieutenant Norman Gill, the captain of Bellwort. Convoy TS 37 departed Takoradi on 26 April but one ship dropped out and was forced to return, escorted by Fandango.

=== U-boats ===
In early April 1943, Admiral Karl Dönitz, the commander of U-boats (BdU, Befehlshaber der U-Boote) sent a wave of Type IX submarines towards Freetown in Sierra Leone. U-124 attacked Convoy OS 45 on 2 April and sank Gogra (5,190 GRT) Katha (4,357 GRT) and was then sunk by Escort Group 37. U-117 and U-455 laid mines off Casablanca on 10 and 11 April that sank one ship of 3,777 GRT and damaged two ships of 14,269 GRT. The rest of the U-boat wave arrived off Freetown between early April and mid-May. U-515 (Kapitanleutnant Werner Henke) had sunk MV California Star (8,300 GRT) on 4 March and MV Bamako (2,357 GRT) on 9 April. U-123 sank the British submarine HMS P615 and four ships of 24,200 GRT, U-105 had sunk a 4,669 GRT ship and U-126 had had no success.

== Voyage ==
=== 26–29 April ===
Convoy TS 37 departed Takoradi on 26 April and by 29 April was about 120 nmi (220 km; 140 mi) from Freetown, where it was sighted by U-515. The commander of the escort intercepted a U-boat W/T Morse transmission and kept radio silence, sending a coded message via a Hudson patrolling over the convoy. The Hudson crew put the message into its routine report, not knowing its contents and it did not reach the Flag Officer, West Africa before the convoy was attacked. Three destroyers were sent urgently to reinforce the convoy escort but they arrived too late. At 6:20 p.m. GST (4:20 p.m. GMT) nearly three hours before nightfall, an aircraft due to patrol over Convoy TS 37 ran into severe storms and had to turn back. The stormy weather on a moonless night, led the RAF to cancel night operations.

=== Night, 29 April/1 May ===
A Torpedo Fire Control Triangle

U-515 had fought off a Catalina with its 20 mm anti-aircraft gun. The moonless night of 29 April was black with lightning on the horizon. There were overcast sky, squalls of rain, good visibility with a moderate sea and a light westerly wind. As U-515 closed on the convoy its Metox apparatus detected metric radar transmissions from an escort ship but Henke continued for nearly three hours. He exploited a squall to get through the rear of the convoy, into the middle. At steerageway (the minimum speed to steer) at an oblique angle north-east to the course of the convoy.

The watch officer took bearing, range and bow angle on two ships in port columns astern for a torpedo salvo (Mehrfach). The data was put into the Torpedovorhaltrechner (deflection calculator) by the Second Watch Officer and in the aft torpedo room the outer doors of torpedo tubes 5 and 6 were opened to flood them for launch. Set to a depth of 5 m (16 ft) the torpedoes were fired at 10:56 p.m. and a stopwatch started. The Second Watch Officer began the aiming calculations on four ships ahead in the starboard columns and four torpedoes were fired from the forward tubes.

==== Kota Tjandi ====
White hit by torpedo rockets were fired by ships in the convoy, followed by star shells from the escorts searching for a U-boat. Lookouts on the U-boat saw a small patrol vessel and "a destroyer" to port and "a destroyer" to starboard attacking head on. Henke ordered a crash-dive and U-515 submerged to 170 m (560 ft). Depth-charge explosions were heard, probably from Bellwort, in the distance. The U-boat hydrophone operator reported the sound of collapsing bulkheads as the crew loaded three more torpedoes. Both of the stern torpedoes missed but the four from the forward tubes, fired over 6.5 minutes, hit the British-chartered Dutch MS Kota Tjandi (7,295 GRT) en route from Haifa to Britain with 7,453 long tons (7,573 t) of potash, rubber waste and 1,000 long tons (1,000 t) of tea, via Table Bay, Takoradi and Freetown. The torpedo hit the port side and of 91 crew and eight naval and army gunners, six men were killed.

==== Nagina ====
To the starboard of Kota Tjandi, the British ship Nagina, 6,551 GRT, carrying cargo including 2,750 long tons (2,790 t) of pig iron was hit. The crew comprised 93 men with eight naval and two army gunners. Captain W. Bird saw a torpedo approaching on the port beam and hit between holds 1 and 2, destroying No. 2 lifeboat and a raft, the ship taking on an immediate list of around 10° to port. Bird ordered 'stop engines' and as the list got worse, he ordered "abandon ship". The five remaining lifeboats were lowered but one capsized; three rafts were got away and everyone was off the ship in seven minutes, the ship sinking at 9:13 p.m. (GMT). At 10:30 p.m. GMT, the trawler Birdlip, rescued the occupants of two of the lifeboats. On 3 May, five survivors were found by a destroyer from Freetown and on 4 May an aircraft crew spotted a lifeboat and the survivors were rescued by a motor launch; two of the crew were killed in the sinking.

==== Bandar Shahpour ====
The third ship to be hit, the British SS Bandar Shahpour, 5,236 GRT, on a voyage from Abadan, Mormugao, Takoradi and Freetown to Britain, with general cargo of 3,000 long tons (3,000 t) tons of manganese ore, oil seeds, rubber, copra and 2,002 bags of mail. The ship had a crew of 62 men including four naval and four army gunners. The ship also had eight passengers, two women, a child and five officers of the Merchant Navy. The captain, W. A. Chappell, reported that two gunners saw the torpedo, too late to avoid. The torpedo explosion blew many of the 2,002 bags of mail into the air and the main mast fell on the wireless room. Chappell fired white hit by torpedo flares and sent a distress call that was received by the Convoy Commodore, before ordering the ship to be abandoned. Three lifeboats were lowered but No. 4 boat capsized. After about half an hour, the survivors, less one man killed, were rescued by Birdlip, now carrying 253 survivors, the ship sank at 11:00 .p.m. GMT.

==== Corabella ====
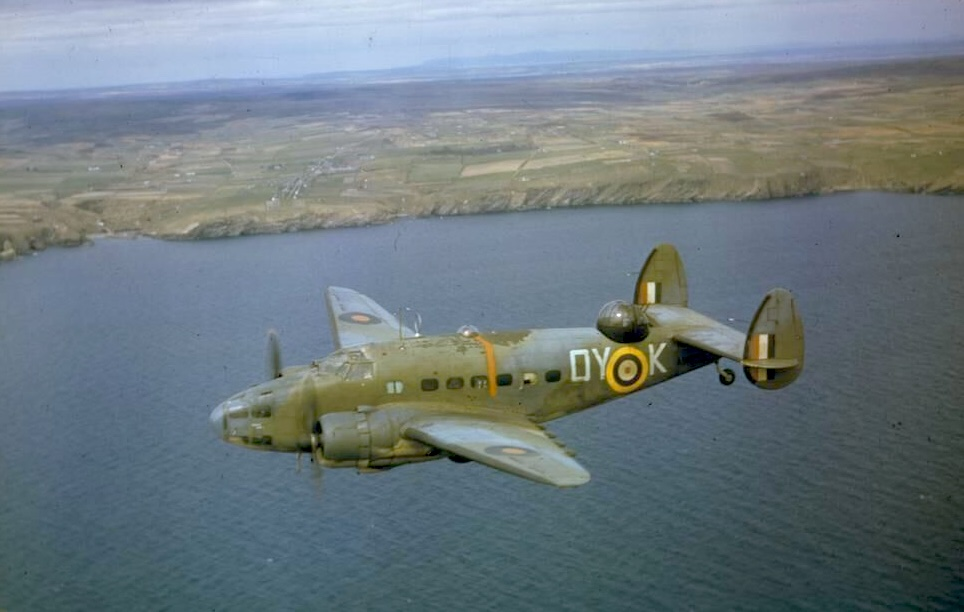
A Hudson, similar to those flown in West Africa by 200 Squadron

The last ship to be torpedoed was the British MS Corabella, 5,681 GRT, carrying 8,035 long tons (8,164 t) of manganese ore with a crew of 48 including six naval and two army gunners. Corabella was making 8.5 kn (15.7 km/h; 9.8 mph) on a course 295°, when hit in No. 2 hold on the port side. Having struggled on deck, the captain, P. Leggett, found that the bridge, the wireless room and the transmitter had been crushed by the mast and wireless aerial. As the ship listed to port and settled by the bow, Leggett ordered an abandon ship. The lifeboat to starboard got away with 25 men but the other boat fouled its davits and a raft were swept away.

Leggett called "Every man for himself!", going over the side after the rest of the crew, the wreckage floating around helping him remain afloat. Birdlip came up after about two hours and rescued thirty of the crew. Five men were rescued on 1 May and just before sunset four men were seen clinging to wreckage by the crew of an RAF aircraft. A rubber dinghy was dropped and two men swam to the dinghy, put in the other two men who were seriously injured and took turns swimming and splashing around to keep sharks and barracuda off. The men were rescued during the morning of 2 May and taken to Freetown; nine men from the crew had been killed.

=== 1 May ===
==== Mokambo ====
At 1:30 a.m. GST, U-515 surfaced and lit by the lightning, Henke saw débris, lifeboats and rafts showing lights and Birdlip rescuing survivors. (Note: At 2:00 a.m. on Monday 29 March 1943, German clocks had been advanced by an hour to 3:00 a.m. to save daylight.) Henke claimed later to have attacked Birdlip but it was not hit despite being stationary. When three of the bow tubes had been loaded, Henke headed northwards and at 5:13 a.m. caught up with the convoy again. After half an hour, the night still dark and visibility declining, U-515 got into the starboard columns of the convoy and aimed at three ships to port as the convoy made about 7 kn (13 km/h; 8.1 mph). The torpedoes were set to run at 7 m (23 ft) and at 5:49 a.m. a torpedo hit the Belgian freighter Mokambo, 4,996 GRT, from Matadi, Takoradi to Freetown and Britain with 1,139 long tons (1,157 t) of palm oil, 1,520 long tons (1,540 t) of kernels, 440 long tons (450 t) of copal, 2,000 long tons (2,000 t) of cotton, 2,000 long tons (2,000 t) of copper and 38 long tons (39 t) of aluminium ore. There was cloud and showers, the night was still dark and there was a slight swell with a westerly wind.

==== City of Singapore ====
The next ship to be hit was the British SS City of Singapore, 6,555 GRT, sailing from Calcutta and Takoradi for Freetown and Liverpool with a 9,000 long tons (9,100 t) cargo of 2,750 long tons (2,790 t) of pig iron and 2,750 long tons (2,790 t) of general cargo and mail, the rest being made up of jute, linseed and groundnuts. A torpedo hit abaft (more than 90 degrees from the bow) the main mast to starboard. Hatches and beams from 5 Hold were smashed, 4 Hold flooded; the deck gun was blown onto the deck and one of the six lifeboats was destroyed, the rest being covered with oil from the tanks. Captain A. G. Freeman stopped engines; broadcast a distress signal, fired two white rockets, showed the red light and when the ship had almost stopped, threw the confidential books overboard. Freeman ordered an Abandon Ship and was the last to leave, in No. 2 boat, once certain that everyone had gone. Minutes after the ship had been abandoned it folded in two and sank. After 90 minutes adrift, Birdlip and Arran rescued all 89 crew and gunners.

==== Clan Macpherson ====
The British freighter Clan Macpherson, 6,940 GRT, from Calcutta, Durban and Takoradi for Freetown and Britain with 8,421 long tons (8,556 t) of general cargo made up of 2,750 long tons (2,790 t) of pig iron, with zinc, mica, jute, linseed, tea and groundnuts, had a crew of 140 men and gunners. The torpedo hit 2 Hold on the starboard side that was 100 ft (30 m) long. Captain Gough ordered Abandon Ship immediately, put on the red light, sent up two white hit by torpedo rockets, made a distress call and jettisoned the confidential books.

All my men lined up like soldiers... no one attempted to do anything without orders, and within ten minutes the five lifeboats and the one small boat were clear of the ship.

— Captain Gough

The ship did not quickly sink and the occupants of No. 2 bridge boat were rescued by Silver Ash. The men in the other five boats, keeping together by shining torches, were approached by Arran. The trawler waited for daylight and the crew re-embarked on Clan Macpherson, started pumps and the engineers raised steam.

By 9:20 a.m. the ship was under way on a heading of 047° for Freetown, about 67 nmi (124 km; 77 mi) away. Before long it was obvious that 1 hold was filling and the ship had to be trimmed. Gough ordered the engine room crew to fill tanks 4 and 5 to bring the boat down by the stern. When complete, the ship had a list to starboard and the sea was lapping at the fore deck. Gough hoped to be towed in backwards by Arran but it was too late and abandon ship was ordered again. Gough told the engine room crew to get out and two minutes after the boats were away, the ship reared up for a moment and sank, taking the Chief, Second, Fourth and Fifth Engineers down with it. Gough later commended six lascars (Indian sailors) who had gone into 1 hold to reinforce a bulkhead with bags. Gough wrote that had the bulkhead collapsed, "all would have most certainly been drowned". The survivors landed Freetown at 8:15 p.m. GMT on 1 May.

== Aftermath ==
=== Analysis ===
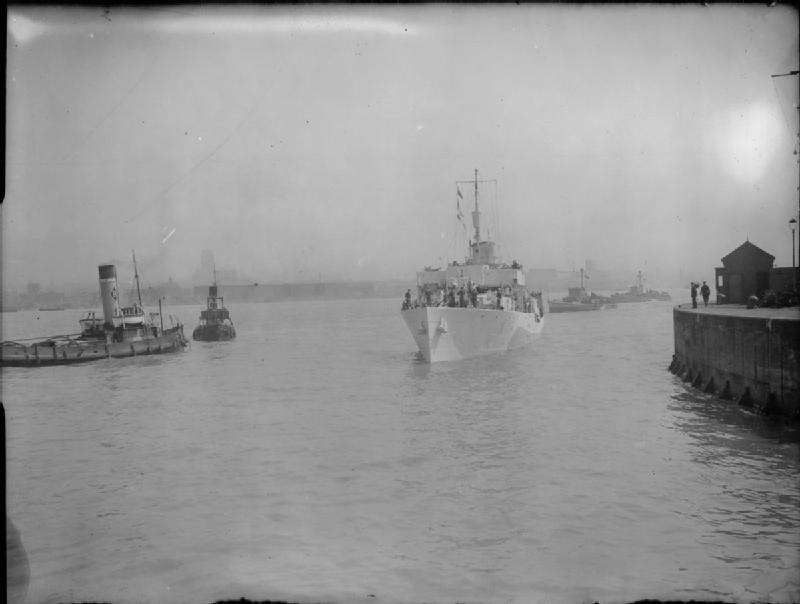
HMS Bellwort entering port during the war

In 2000, Clay Blair wrote that Henke's attack was "one of the most remarkable convoy attacks of the war" similar to the attack by Joachim Schepke on Convoy SC 11 and that by Otto Kretschmer on Convoy SC 7. During the evening of 1 May, Henke received a Funkspruch (wireless signal) from BdU in Berlin acknowledging his report of the sinkings, "BRAVO". On 24 June, after an "arduous but productive" 124-day patrol, one of the longest undertaken by the U-boat Arm, Henke was awarded Oak Leaves to his Knight's Cross. The Germans kept U-boats off Freetown until June but these had no success.

The Prime Minister, Winston Churchill, called the sinkings deplorable. Sir Archibald Sinclair, the Secretary of State for Air told the Anti-U-Boat Warfare Committee that "Bad weather was responsible for the absence of air escort during the night on which the seven ships had been sunk". The Admiralty noted that when the Germans attacked in areas that had been free from attack, losses were unavoidable. Convoy TS 37 had been the only TS convoy to be attacked since the series had begun in September 1942 and 743 ships had been convoyed safely. During the voyage of Convoy TS 37, a WS troop convoy was en route to Sicily through the area, a floating dock was on tow from Gibraltar to Freetown, an OS convoy with 21 ships was also heading for Freetown and a twenty-ship ST convoy was on the reciprocal route from Freetown to Takoradi and all had been untroubled.

=== Casualties ===
The British ships suffered casualties of 22 men killed and several injured in the sinkings.

=== Subsequent operations ===
After taking on supplies from U-460, U-515, U-126 and U-105 continued their patrols and found several convoys but only U-126 managed to attack, torpedoing two ships of 13,374 GRT, one of which sank. On 2 June, U-105 was sunk by a Free French Potez-CAMS 141 flying-boat (Antarès) of Escadrille 4E from Dakar. Off the port, U-214 laid mines and damaged a 6,507 GRT ship.

== Allied order of battle ==
=== Convoyed ships ===
Merchant ships
Name	Year	Flag	GRT	Notes
SS Bandar Shahpour	1927	Merchant Navy	5,236	Sunk, 30 April, U-515, 07°15′N, 13°49′W, 1† 69 surv
Baron Ramsay	1929	Merchant Navy	3,650	
Blairclova	1938	Merchant Navy	5,083	
Buteshire	1912	Merchant Navy	6,590	
SS City Of Derby	1921	Merchant Navy	6,616	
City Of Singapore	1923	Merchant Navy	6,555	Sunk 1 April, U-515, 07°55′N, 14°16′W, all 97 surv
Clan Macpherson	1929	Merchant Navy	6,940	1 April, U-515, 07°58′N, 14°14′W, sunk 08°04′N, 14°12′W 4†, 139 surv
MS Corabella	1937	Merchant Navy	5,682	Sunk, 30 April, U-515, 07°14′N, 13°48′W 9† 39 surv
Empire Voice	1940	Merchant Navy	6,828	
Glenpark	1939	Merchant Navy	5,136	
Glenwood	1940	Merchant Navy	4,897	
Kota Tjandi	1930	Netherlands	7,295	Sunk, 30 April, U-515 07°15′N, 13°49′W, 6† 93 surv
Matadian	1936	Merchant Navy	4,275	
Mokambo	1938	Belgium	4,878	1 May, U-515, 07°40′N, 14°05′W, 0† 58 surv, foundered off Freetown
Nagina	1921	Merchant Navy	6,551	Sunk 30 April, U-515, 07°19′N, 13°50′W, 2† 11 surv
Norton	1941	Merchant Navy	7,195	
MV Silverash	1926	Merchant Navy	5,311	
Strategist	1937	Merchant Navy	6,255	
Zarembo	1919	United States	4,957	

=== Convoy escorts ===
Escorts
Name	Flag	Type	Notes
Escorts (26 April – 1 May)
HMS Bellwort	Royal Navy	Flower-class corvette	
HMT Arran	Royal Navy	Isles-class trawler	
HMT Birdlip	Royal Navy	Hill-class trawler	
HMT Fandango	Royal Navy	Dance-class trawler	
Destroyer reinforcements (from 1 May)
HMS Rapid	Royal Navy	R-class destroyer	
HMS Malcolm	Royal Navy	Scott-class destroyer	
HMS Wolverine	Royal Navy	W-class destroyer	

== Kriegsmarine ==
=== U-boats ===
U-boats
Boat	Flag	Type	Notes
U-105	Kriegsmarine	Type IXB submarine	
U-117	Kriegsmarine	Type IXB submarine	
U-123	Kriegsmarine	Type IXB submarine	
U-124	Kriegsmarine	Type IXB submarine	
U-126	Kriegsmarine	Type IXC submarine	
U-455	Kriegsmarine	Type VIIC submarine	
U-460	Kriegsmarine	Type XIV submarine	Milchkuh (Milch Cow)
U-515	Kriegsmarine	Type IXC submarine	Werner Henke

== Bibliography ==
- Blair, Clay (2000) [1998]. Hitler's U-Boat War: The Hunted 1942–1945 (pbk. repr. 2nd ed.). London: Cassell. ISBN 0-304-35261-6.
- Gannon, Michael (2011) [1998]. Black May. London: HarperCollins e-books. ISBN 978-0-06-203946-0.
- Jordan, Roger W. (2006) [1999]. The World's Merchant Fleets 1939: The Particulars and Wartime Fates of 6,000 Ships (2nd ed.). London: Chatham/Lionel Leventhal. ISBN 978-1-86176-293-1.
- Kindell, Don (2026). "Convoy TS.37".
- Rohwer, Jürgen; Hümmelchen, Gerhard (2005) [1972]. Chronology of the War at Sea, 1939–1945: The Naval History of World War Two (3rd rev. ed.). London: Chatham. ISBN 978-1-86176-257-3.
- Roskill, S. W. (1962) [1956]. The Period of Balance. History of the Second World War United Kingdom Military Series: The War at Sea 1939–1945. Vol. II (3rd impr. ed.). London: HMSO. OCLC 174453986 – via Archive Foundation.
- Sharpe, Peter (1998). U-Boat Fact File. Leicester: Midland Publishing. ISBN 1-85780-072-9.
