= U67 =

U67, U-67 or U 67 may refer to:

- U 67 (film), a 1931 American film directed by William Nigh
- German submarine U-67, various vessels
- HMIS Indus (U67), a sloop of the Royal Indian Navy
- Neumann U 67, a condenser microphone
- Nonconvex great rhombicosidodecahedron
- Small nucleolar RNA SNORA67
