= U66 =

U66 may refer to:

- German submarine U-66, various vessels
- Great stellated truncated dodecahedron
- HMS Starling (U66), a sloop of the Royal Navy
- Small nucleolar RNA SNORA66
