= U43 =

U43 may refer to:

== Naval vessels ==
- German submarine U-43, various vessels
- HMS Bideford (U43), a sloop of the Royal Navy
- U-43-class submarine (Austria-Hungary), of the Austro-Hungarian Navy
  - SM U-43 (Austria-Hungary), the lead boat of the class

== Other uses ==
- Monticello Airport (Utah)
- Small ditrigonal dodecicosidodecahedron
- Small nucleolar RNA SNORD43
- U43, a line of the Dortmund Stadtbahn
