= NRP Gonçalves Zarco =

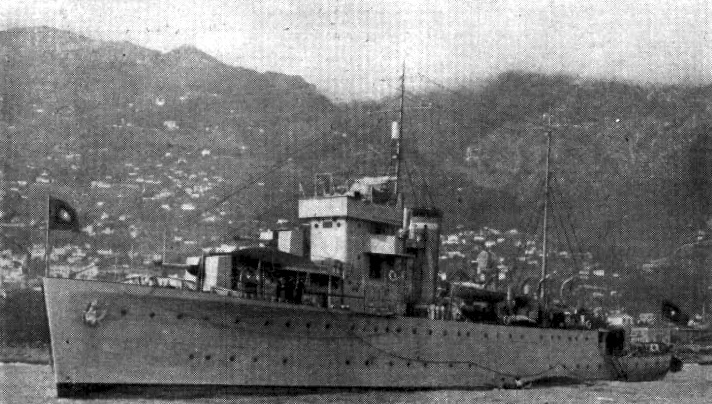
- Gonçalves Zarco in the 1940s

History

Portugal
- Name: Gonçalves Zarco
- Builder: Hawthorn-Leslie (UK)
- Laid down: 9 October 1931
- Launched: 28 November 1932
- Fate: Discarded 1969

General characteristics
- Class & type: Gonçalo Velho-class sloop
- Displacement: 950 t (930 long tons) standard; 1,414 t (1,392 long tons) full load
- Length: 81.69 m (268 ft 0 in)
- Beam: 10.82 m (35 ft 6 in)
- Draught: 3.43 m (11 ft 3 in)
- Propulsion: 2 turbines; 2,000 hp (1,500 kW)
- Speed: 16.5 knots (30.6 km/h; 19.0 mph)
- Range: 6,000 nmi (11,000 km; 6,900 mi) at 10 knots (19 km/h; 12 mph)
- Complement: 142
- Armament: 3 × single 120 mm (4.7 in) guns; 4 × single 40 mm (1.6 in) guns

NRP Gonçalves Zarco was a second class Gonçalo Velho-class sloop (aviso de 2ª classe) of the Portuguese Navy. She was designed to operate in the overseas territories of Portugal. The ship entered service in 1933 and was among the core of the fleet until the late 1940s. Following World War II, new ships were acquired and Gonçalves Zarco was discarded 1969.

== Design and description ==
Gonçalves Zarco was a sloop of the Gonçalo Velho class. They were based on the Royal Navy's Bridgewater-class sloops, but with a heavier armament and omitting the minelaying equipment of the British ships. Gonçalves Zarco's hull was 81.69 metres (268 ft 0 in) long overall and 76.20 m (250 ft 0 in) between perpendiculars, with a beam of 10.82 m (35 ft 6 in) and a draught of 3.43 m (11 ft 3 in). Two Yarrow boilers fed Parsons geared steam turbines, giving 2,000 shaft horsepower (1,500 kW) and driving two propeller shafts, with a design speed of 16.5 knots (30.6 km/h; 19.0 mph). 470 tons of oil were carried giving a range of 6,000 nautical miles (11,000 km; 6,900 mi) at 11 knots (20 km/h; 13 mph). They had a standard displacement of 950 tonnes (930 long tons) and 1,414 t (1,392 long tons) at full load. They had a crew of 142 initially, but this was later reduced to 128.

Armament consisted of three 120-millimetre (4.7 in) guns in single mounts on the ship's centreline, with two forward and one aft. Four 2-pounder (40 mm) pom-pom anti-aircraft (AA) guns were fitted, while four depth charge throwers provided an anti-submarine armament. In 1943, the 40 mm guns were removed and replaced by five single-mounted 20 mm (0.79 in) AA cannon.

== Construction and career ==
In 1930, Portugal set up a ten-year plan to modernise its navy. As part of this programme, a contract was placed with the British shipbuilder Hawthorn Leslie for two sloops, to be named Gonçalo Velho and Gonçalves Zarco. Gonçalves Zarco was laid down on 9 October 1931, and launched on 28 November 1932. Construction was completed in May 1933.

The two sloops were among the ships that formed the core of the fleet until the late 1940s. They were tasked with coastal defence and defence of Portugal's colonial possessions. Following World War II, the ship was reclassified as a frigate. Portugal acquired new ships in the postwar era and Gonçalves Zarco was discarded in 1969.
