= Small nucleolar RNA SNORA48 =

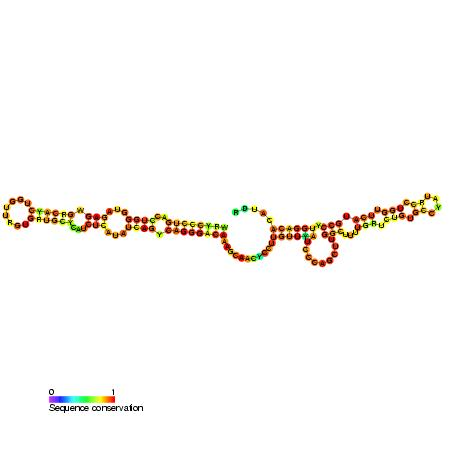
- Predicted secondary structure and sequence conservation of SNORA48

Identifiers
- Symbol: SNORA48
- Alt. Symbols: snoACA48
- Rfam: RF00554

Other data
- RNA type: Gene; snRNA; snoRNA; H/ACA-box
- Domain: Eukaryota
- GO: GO:0006396 GO:0005730
- SO: SO:0000594
- PDB structures: PDBe

In molecular biology, Small nucleolar RNA SNORA48 is a pseudouridylation guide H/ACA box snoRNA. This snoRNA was cloned in 2004 from a HeLa cell extract immunoprecipitated with an anti-GAR1 antibody. It is predicted to guide the pseudouridylation of residue U3797 of 28S rRNA.

The pseudouridylation of this residue had been reported in 1997. The H/ACA box snoRNAs ACA48 and U67, and the C/D box snoRNA mgU6-77, share the same host gene (EIF4A1).
