= NRP Gonçalo Velho =

2nd class sloop

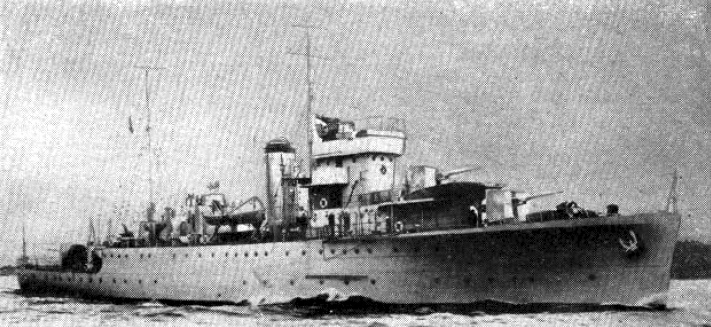
- Gonçalo Velho in the 1940s

History

Portugal
- Name: Gonçalo Velho
- Builder: Hawthorn-Leslie (UK)
- Laid down: 9 October 1931
- Launched: 3 August 1932
- Fate: Broken up June 1961

General characteristics
- Class & type: Gonçalo Velho-class sloop
- Displacement: 950 t (930 long tons) standard; 1,414 t (1,392 long tons) full load
- Length: 81.69 m (268 ft 0 in)
- Beam: 10.82 m (35 ft 6 in)
- Draught: 3.43 m (11 ft 3 in)
- Propulsion: 2 turbines; 2,000 hp (1,500 kW)
- Speed: 16.5 knots (30.6 km/h; 19.0 mph)
- Range: 6,000 nmi (11,000 km; 6,900 mi) at 10 knots (19 km/h; 12 mph)
- Complement: 142
- Armament: 3 × single 120 mm (4.7 in) guns; 4 × single 40 mm (1.6 in) guns

NRP Gonçalo Velho was a second class Gonçalo Velho-class sloop (aviso de 2ª classe) of the Portuguese Navy. She was designed to operate in the overseas territories of Portugal. The ship entered service in 1933 and was among the core of the fleet until the late 1940s. Following World War II, new ships were acquired and Gonçalo Velho was broken up for scrap in 1961.

== Design and description ==
Gonçalo Velho was a sloop of the Gonçalo Velho class. They were based on the Royal Navy's Bridgewater-class sloops, but with a heavier armament and omitting the minelaying equipment of the British ships. Gonçalo Velho's hull was 81.69 metres (268 ft 0 in) long overall and 76.20 metres (250 ft 0 in) between perpendiculars, with a beam of 10.82 metres (35 ft 6 in) and a draught of 3.43 metres (11 ft 3 in). Two Yarrow boilers fed Parsons geared steam turbines, giving 2,000 shaft horsepower (1,500 kW) and driving two propeller shafts, with a design speed of 16.5 knots (30.6 km/h; 19.0 mph). 470 tons of oil were carried giving a range of 6,000 nautical miles (11,000 km; 6,900 mi) at 11 knots (20 km/h; 13 mph). They had a standard displacement of 950 tonnes (930 long tons) and 1,414 t (1,392 long tons) at full load. They had a crew of 142 initially, but this was later reduced to 128.

Armament consisted of three 120-millimetre (4.7 in) guns in single mounts on the ship's centreline, with two forward and one aft. Four 2-pounder (40 mm) pom-pom anti-aircraft (AA) guns were fitted, while four depth charge throwers provided an anti-submarine armament. In 1943, the 40 mm guns were removed and replaced by five single-mounted 20 mm (0.79 in) AA cannon.

== Construction and career ==
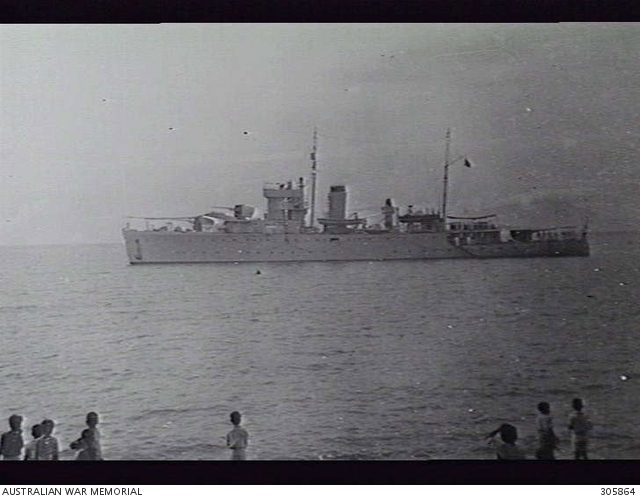
Gonçalo Velho in the Port of Dili, Portuguese Timor, in April 1945

In 1930, Portugal set up a ten-year plan to modernise its navy. As part of this programme, a contract was placed with the British shipbuilder Hawthorn Leslie for two sloops, to be named Gonçalo Velho and Gonçalves Zarco. Gonçalo Velho was laid down on 9 October 1931, and launched on 3 August 1932. Construction was completed in May 1933.

The two ships were among those that formed the core of the fleet until the late 1940s. They were tasked with coastal defence and defence of Portugal's colonial possessions.

Following World War II, the ships were reclassified as frigates. Portugal acquired new ships in the postwar era and Gonçalo Velho was broken up for scrap in June 1961.
