= SS Molly Pitcher =

Liberty ship of WWII

History

United States
- Name: Ward Hunt, before 14 October 1942; Molly Pitcher, renamed 14 October 1942
- Namesake: Ward Hunt; Molly Pitcher
- Owner: War Shipping Administration (WSA)
- Operator: Prudential Steamship Corporation
- Ordered: as type (EC2-S-C1) hull, MCE hull 935
- Awarded: 30 January 1942
- Builder: Bethlehem-Fairfield Shipyard, Baltimore, Maryland
- Cost: $1,074,267
- Yard number: 2085
- Way number: 9
- Laid down: 12 December 1942
- Launched: 30 January 1943
- Completed: 22 February 1943
- Identification: Call sign: KEXY
- Fate: Torpedoed and sunk in Atlantic Ocean, 17 March 1943

General characteristics
- Class & type: Liberty ship; type EC2-S-C1, standard
- Tonnage: 10,865 LT DWT; 7,176 GRT
- Displacement: 3,380 long tons (3,434 t) (light); 14,245 long tons (14,474 t) (max)
- Length: 441 feet 6 inches (135 m) oa; 416 feet (127 m) pp; 427 feet (130 m) lwl
- Beam: 57 feet (17 m)
- Draft: 27 ft 9.25 in (8.4646 m)
- Installed power: 2 × Oil fired 450 °F (232 °C) boilers, operating at 220 psi (1,500 kPa); 2,500 hp (1,900 kW)
- Propulsion: 1 × triple-expansion steam engine, (manufactured by General Machinery Corp., Hamilton, Ohio); 1 × screw propeller
- Speed: 11.5 knots (21.3 km/h; 13.2 mph)
- Capacity: 562,608 cubic feet (15,931 m^{3}) (grain); 499,573 cubic feet (14,146 m^{3}) (bale)
- Complement: 38–62 USMM; 21–40 USNAG
- Armament: Varied by ship; Bow-mounted 3-inch (76 mm)/50-caliber gun; Stern-mounted 4-inch (102 mm)/50-caliber gun; 2–8 × single 20-millimeter (0.79 in) Oerlikon anti-aircraft (AA) cannons and/or, 2–8 × 37-millimeter (1.46 in) M1 AA guns

SS Molly Pitcher was a Liberty ship built in the United States during World War II. She was named after Molly Pitcher, a nickname given to a woman who fought in the American Revolutionary War. She is most often identified as Mary Ludwig Hays, who fought in the Battle of Monmouth in June 1778. Another possibility is Margaret Corbin, who helped defend Fort Washington in New York, in November 1776.

== Construction ==
Molly Pitcher was laid down on 12 December 1942, under a Maritime Commission (MARCOM) contract, MCE hull 935, by the Bethlehem-Fairfield Shipyard, Baltimore, Maryland; she was launched on 30 January 1943.

== History ==
She was allocated to Prudential Steamship Corporation, on 22 February 1943.

On 17 March 1943, while traveling in a Convoy UGS 6 to Casablanca, from New York, she was struck by a torpedo, fired from U-167, approximately 500 miles (800 km) west of Lisbon. The torpedo struck in her #3 hold, on the port side, which damaged the bulkhead between #2 and #3 holds, resulting in both holds flooding. She had been carrying 5,600 long tons (5,700 t) of general cargo, which included sugar, coffee, explosives, coal, in addition to tractors, trucks, and ambulances. The helmsman of the Molly Pitcher deserted his post which caused her to veer to port and the center of the convoy. Before the ship was brought to a stop, the master ordered the ship to be abandoned, but 17 men were left behind in the confusion, with 2 officers and 2 armed guards drowning. The ship then began turning in circles with the engines still running. The remaining men were able to avoid the survivors and get the ship underway at 10 knots (19 km/h; 12 mph), but the compass had been damaged so they were unable to locate the convoy and later abandoned the ship at 23:30. The survivors were picked up by the Champlin, SS William Johnson, and Rowan, with Champlin trying, unsuccessfully, to sink Molly Pitcher with a torpedo. She was finally finished off at 05:50, on 18 March, by U-521. The master's license was later suspended on charges of misconduct during the attack on Molly Pitcher.

Wreck location: 38°21′N 19°54′W

== Bibliography ==
- "Bethlehem-Fairfield, Baltimore MD". www.ShipbuildingHistory.com. 7 August 2021.
- Maritime Administration. "Molly Pitcher". Ship History Database Vessel Status Card. U.S. Department of Transportation, Maritime Administration.
- Davies, James (May 2004). "Specifications (As-Built)" (PDF). p. 23.
- "SS Molly Pitcher".
- "Molly Pitcher".
