= Celtic Star =

Celtic Star may refer to a number of ships.

- MS Celtic Star a ro/ro ferry entering service in 2008 with Seatruck Ferries.
- SS Celtic Star (1918), a cargo ship torpedoed and sunk in 1943.
- SS Celtic Star (1942), a refrigerated cargo ship which served with Blue Star Line in 1946.
