= ST Empire Ace =

History
- Name: Empire Ace (1942–47); Diligent (1947–61); Empire Ace (1961–71)
- Owner: Ministry of War Transport (1942–46); Ministry of Transport (1946–47); Admiralty (1947–61); Ministry of Defence (1961–71)
- Operator: Owner operated except: US Navy (1961–64)
- Port of registry: (United Kingdom) Goole (1942–47); (United Kingdom) London (1947–71)
- Builder: Cochrane & Sons Ltd, Selby
- Yard number: 1255
- Launched: 19 September 1942
- Completed: 22 December 1942
- Out of service: 11 November 1968
- Identification: UK official number 169078; call sign MFLY (1942–47)
- Fate: Scrapped 1971

General characteristics
- Tonnage: 274 GRT
- Length: 105.2 ft (32.1 m)
- Beam: 26.6 ft (8.1 m)
- Depth: 12.2 ft (3.7 m)
- Installed power: 132 NHP
- Propulsion: 1 × triple-expansion engine; 1 × screw

Empire Ace was a 275-ton tug which was built in 1942 for the Ministry of War Transport (MoWT). She was transferred to the Admiralty in 1947 and renamed Diligent. She was transferred to the Ministry of Defence in 1961 and reverted to Empire Ace. She ran aground in 1968 and was scrapped in 1971.

== History ==
Empire Ace was built by Cochrane & Sons Ltd, Selby as yard number 1255. She was launched on 12 September 1942 and completed on 22 December 1942. She was built for the MoWT. Empire Ace was sent to Malta.

She was member of Convoy RS 3 in March 1943. She was a member of Convoy KMS 25 which passed Gibraltar on 19 September 1943. She had sailed from Algiers with an unrecorded destination, but likely to have been Malta. Empire Ace was sunk in an air raid on Malta on 15 March 1944. On 10 May she was salvaged and repairs were carried out. In 1947 she was transferred to the Admiralty and renamed Diligence. In 1961, Diligence was transferred to the Ministry of Defence and reverted to Empire Ace. She was loaned to the US Navy from December 1961 to December 1964, serving in Scotland. On 11 November 1968, she ran aground at Campbeltown in heavy seas and was abandoned. Empire Ace was refloated in June 1969 but declared a constructive total loss. She was scrapped at Campbeltown in 1971.

== Official number and code letters ==
Official Numbers were a forerunner to IMO Numbers. Empire Ace had the UK official number 1690781 and call sign MFLY.
