= HMS Sandwich (L12) =

Sloop of the Royal Navy

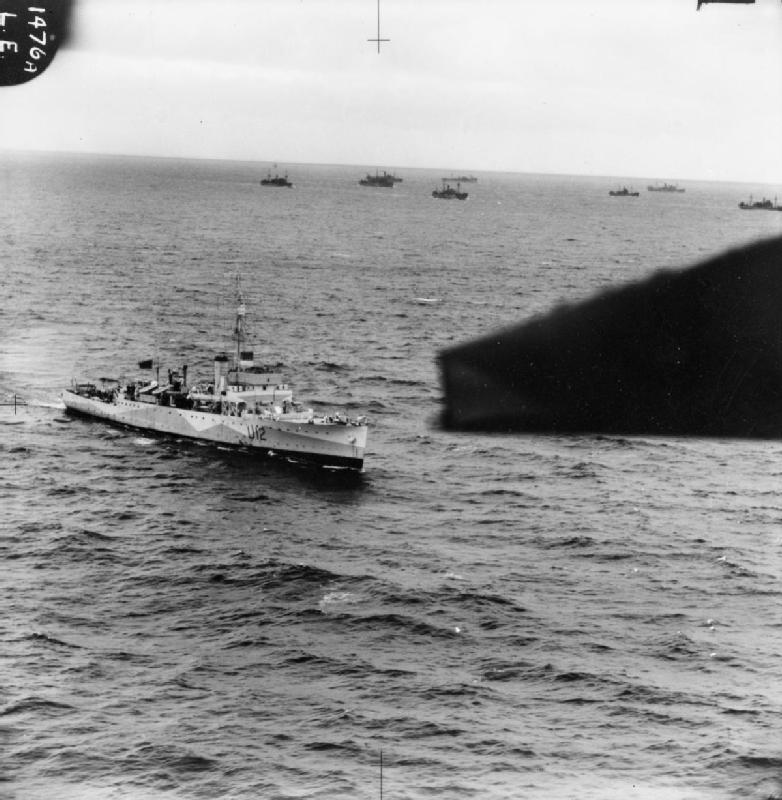
- HMS Sandwich, with a second world war convoy.

History

United Kingdom
- Name: HMS Sandwich
- Namesake: Town of Sandwich, Kent
- Owner: Royal Navy
- Builder: Hawthorn Leslie, Newcastle upon Tyne
- Launched: 28 September 1928
- Out of service: 1944
- Honours and awards: Atlantic
- Fate: sold in 1946

General characteristics
- Displacement: 1,045 tons
- Length: 250 ft (76 m)
- Beam: 34 ft (10 m)
- Draught: 8.7 ft (2.7 m)
- Speed: 16 kn (30 km/h)
- Complement: 100
- Armament: 2 x 4-inch (102 mm)

HMS Sandwich (L12) was a Bridgewater-class sloop built by Hawthorn Leslie, Newcastle. After a decade of peacetime service on the China Station, she escorted Atlantic convoys through World War II.

== Construction and design ==
HMS Sandwich was ordered from Hawthorn Leslie on 19 September 1927, one of two Bridgwater-class sloops ordered from Hawthorn Leslie that day. The Bridgewaters were intended as replacements for the Flower-class sloops, and were to combine the role of peacetime patrol work at distant overseas stations (with the Bridgewaters being specifically intended for service in the Persian Gulf) with a wartime role as minesweepers.

Sandwich was 266 feet 4 inches (81.18 m) long overall and 250 feet (76 m) between perpendiculars, with a beam of 34 feet (10 m) and a draught of 11 feet 5 inches (3.48 m). Displacement was 1,045 long tons (1,062 t) standard and 1,600 long tons (1,600 t) full load. The ship was powered by two Parsons geared steam turbines, each driving one propeller shaft, using steam provided by two Admiralty three-drum boiler. The turbines developed a total of 2,000 shaft horsepower (1,500 kW) and were designed to give a maximum speed of 16.5 knots (30.6 km/h; 19.0 mph). The main armament consisted of a pair of QF four-inch (102 mm) Mk V guns on the ship's centreline, one forward and one aft, with the forward gun on a high-angle mount, capable of anti-aircraft fire and the second gun on a low-angle mount, for anti-surface use only. Two 3-pounder saluting guns were also carried, while the anti-submarine armament initially consisted of four depth charges. The ship's crew consisted of 96 officers and ratings.

Sandwich was laid down at Hawthorn Leslie's Tyneside shipyard on 9 February 1928 and was launched without ceremony on 29 September. Sandwich reached a speed of 17.27 knots (31.98 km/h; 19.87 mph) during sea trials and was commissioned on 23 March 1929.

In 1938, the aft four-inch gun was replaced by one on a high-angle mounting and the two saluting guns were exchanged for a pair of quadruple Vickers 0.5 in (12.7 mm) anti-aircraft (AA) machinegun mounts. By the outbreak of the Second World War, the ship had been fitted with ASDIC, and the depth charge outfit was increased to 15 charges.

== Service ==
=== China Station ===
While ordered for service in the Persian Gulf, both Sandwich and her sister ship Bridgewater were first deployed to the China Station, replacing the old sloops Foxglove and Bluebell. She was recommissioned with a new crew at Hong Kong in October 1931, remaining on the China Station. Sandwich, along with the cruiser Cornwall was based at Shanghai during the Shanghai Incident in early 1932. On 23 March 1932, while still at Shanghai, the American destroyer USS Stewart collided with Sandwich and two Chinese barges. While Sandwich suffered minimal damage, Stewart ended up with a length of anchor chain off one of the barges wrapped around a propeller, requiring the propeller to be replaced. Sandwich again received a new crew at Hong Kong in April 1934. When the British owned steamer Tungchow went missing on 31 January 1935 on a voyage between Shanghai and Yantai, having been seized by pirates, Sandwich was one of several warships despatched to search for the missing ship. The pirates abandoned Tungchow when the ship was spotted by aircraft from the aircraft carrier Hermes.

In January 1938, as the Second Sino-Japanese War continued, Sandwich landed men at Weihaiwei to protect British property against rioting as Japanese forces advanced towards the city. The ship was refitted at Hong Kong from April to October 1938, recommissioning with a fresh crew in March 1939.

=== Second World War ===
Sandwich was based at Hong Kong when war was declared, and patrolled the Tsushima Strait for German merchant shipping before sailing east in November 1939 to return to the United Kingdom in December with convoy HG 11. She escorted convoys between Liverpool and Gibraltar until May 1940 and then coastal and Western Approaches convoys rescuing survivors from the sunken freighters King Idwal and Anten of convoy OB 244 in November 1940.

Sandwich began refit at Tilbury in December and resumed convoy escort duties in April 1941 assigned to the 43rd Escort Group. Type 271 radar was installed during refit at Belfast from January through March 1942, and the original .50 caliber anti-aircraft machine guns were replaced with Oerlikon 20 mm cannon during a shorter refit in October. Sandwich was credited with sinking U-213 while escorting convoy OS 35, and then escorted convoys in support of Operation Torch until refit on the River Tyne from February through July 1943.

Upon completion of trials and workup, Sandwich escorted convoys between Liverpool and Sierra Leone as part of the 38th Escort Group from August 1943 until retirement in June 1944. Planned refit at Brindisi was not completed, and the ship was towed to Bizerte in 1945.

=== Convoys escorted ===
Convoy	Escort Group	Dates	Notes
HG 11		16–24 December 1939	52 ships escorted without loss from Gibraltar to Liverpool
OG 16F		26-31 January 1940	23 ships outbound to Gibraltar
HG 17F		31 January-5 February 1940	25 ships escorted without loss from Gibraltar to Liverpool
SL 19		17-20 February 1940	28 ships inbound to Western Approaches
OA 98		26-27 February 1940	19 ships outbound from Western Approaches
HG 20F		28 February-3 March 1940	30 ships inbound to Western Approaches
OG 21F		5-11 March 1940	45 ships outbound to Gibraltar
HG 24		28 March-7 April 1940	41 ships escorted without loss from Gibraltar to Liverpool
OG 26F		14-20 April 1940	54 ships outbound to Gibraltar
HG 29		7-17 May 1940	45 ships escorted without loss from Gibraltar to Liverpool
OB 154		24-27 May 1940	12 ships outbound from Western Approaches
HX 43		27-30 May 1940	43 ships inbound to Western Approaches
OB 159		1-4 June 1940	23 ships outbound from Western Approaches
HX 45		5-7 June 1940	63 ships inbound to Western Approaches
OB 164		9-12 June 1940	29 ships outbound from Western Approaches
HX 47		14-17 June 1940	2 ships lost from 57 inbound to Western Approaches
OB 169		17-20 June 1940	32 ships outbound from Western Approaches
HX 49		20-24 June 1940	1 ship lost from 50 inbound to Western Approaches
OB 174		25-28 June 1940	64 ships outbound from Western Approaches
HX 51		29 June-2 July 1940	35 ships inbound to Western Approaches
OB 180		7-10 July 1940	47 ships outbound from Western Approaches
HX 54		11-14 July 1940	43 ships inbound to Western Approaches
OA 186		17-21 July 1940	39 ships outbound from Western Approaches
HX 57		23-26 July 1940	51 ships inbound to Western Approaches
OA 192		30 July-3 August 1940	18 ships outbound from Western Approaches
HX 60		4-7 August 1940	3 ships lost from 60 inbound to Western Approaches
OA 199		15-19 August 1940	1 ship torpedoed of 29 outbound from Western Approaches
HX 64		20-23 August 1940	62 ships inbound to Western Approaches
OA 206		29 August-3 September 1940	1 ship torpedoed of 48 outbound from Western Approaches
SL 44		3-7 September 1940	1 ship lost from 29 inbound to Western Approaches
OA 214		14-19 September 1940	29 ships outbound from Western Approaches
OA 223		2-6 October 1940	17 ships outbound from Western Approaches
SC 8		15-31 October 1940	40 ships escorted without loss from Sydney to Liverpool
OB 244		17-22 November 1940	3 ships sunk of 46 outbound from Western Approaches
OB 254		4-7 December 1940	13 ships outbound from Western Approaches
OG 59	43rd EG	15-28 April 1941	44 ships escorted without loss from Liverpool to Gibraltar
HG 61	43rd EG	6-20 May 1941	23 ships from Gibraltar to Liverpool; U-96 sank Empire Ridge
OB 332	43rd EG	10-19 June 1941	43 ships escorted without loss from Liverpool to Iceland
HX 134	43rd EG	26 June-4 July 1941	48 ships escorted without loss from Iceland to Liverpool
SC 36	43rd EG	13-17 July 1941	40 ships inbound to Western Approaches
OS 2	43rd EG	4-19 August 1941	17 ships escorted without loss from Liverpool to Sierra Leone
SL 85	43rd EG	28 August-11 September 1941	11 ships from Sierra Leone to Gibraltar; bomber sank Daru
HG 72	43rd EG	11-17 September	17 ships escorted without loss from Gibraltar to Liverpool
OS 8	43rd EG	4-20 October 1941	46 ships escorted without loss from Liverpool to Sierra Leone
SL 91	43rd EG	27 October-19 November 1941	Sierra Leone to Liverpool
OS 13	43rd EG	1-18 December 1941	45 ships escorted without loss from Liverpool to Sierra Leone
SL 96	43rd EG	28 December 1941 – 13 January 1942	35 ships from Sierra Leone to dispersal
OS 23	43rd EG	25 March-11 April 1942	45 ships escorted without loss from Liverpool to Sierra Leone
SL 107	43rd EG	16 April-5 May 1942	32 ships escorted without loss from Sierra Leone to Liverpool
OS 29	43rd EG	22 May-10 June 1942	44 ships escorted without loss from Liverpool to Sierra Leone
SL 113	43rd EG	15-29 June 1942	41 ships escorted without loss from Sierra Leone to Liverpool
OS 35	43rd EG	25 July-12 August 1942	51 ships escorted without loss from Liverpool to Sierra Leone sank U-213
SL 119	43rd EG	14 August-5 September 1942	Sierra Leone to Liverpool; two ships torpedoed and sunk
OS 41	43rd EG	20 September-1 October 1942	41 ship Liverpool to dispersal
SL 123	43rd EG	4-10 October 1942	27 ships escorted without loss from Sierra Leone to Liverpool
KMS 2	43rd EG	26 October-12 November 1942	1 ship sunk of 51 from Loch Ewe to Operation Torch
TE 7	43rd EG	28 November 1942	Gibraltar to North Africa
GUF 3	43rd EG	30 December 1942 – 1 January 1943	North Africa to Gibraltar
CF 10	43rd EG	5-8 January 1943	Cape Town to United Kingdom
GUS 3	43rd EG	18-19 January 1943	North Africa to Gibraltar
MKS 7	43rd EG	8-17 February 1943	Algiers to Liverpool
SL 137	38th EG	23 September-17 October 1943	49 ships escorted without loss from Sierra Leone to Liverpool
OS 57	38th EG	31 October-18 November 1943	78 ships escorted without loss from Liverpool to Sierra Leone
SL 141	38th EG	23 November-12 December 1943	14 ships escorted without loss from Sierra Leone to Liverpool
OS 61	38th EG	19-29 December 1943	42 ships escorted without loss from Liverpool to Sierra Leone
SL 145	38th EG	1-12 January 1944	33 ships escorted without loss from Sierra Leone to Liverpool
OS 65	38th EG	26 January-6 February 1944	41 ships escorted without loss from Liverpool to Sierra Leone
SL 149	38th EG	11-22 February 1944	47 ships escorted without loss from Sierra Leone to Liverpool
OS 69	38th EG	5-15 March 1944	47 ships escorted without loss from Liverpool to Sierra Leone
SL 153	38th EG	22 March-2 April 1944	47 ships escorted without loss from Sierra Leone to Liverpool
OS 73	38th EG	16-25 April 1944	44 ships escorted without loss from Liverpool to Sierra Leone
SL 157	38th EG	1-10 May 1944	45 ships escorted without loss from Sierra Leone to Liverpool
OS 77	38th EG	23 May-2 June 1944	31 ships escorted without loss from Liverpool to Sierra Leone
SL 161	38th EG	11-22 June 1944	41 ships escorted without loss from Sierra Leone to Liverpool

== Disposal and fate ==
Sandwich was sold at Bizerte in 1946 for £3,050 to local interests for mercantile service. Some hold that she was scrapped after conversion was abandoned. Others say that she was renamed Prince Albert in 1946, then owned by Hui Bon Hua of Tunis and registered at that port as the mercantile Amoy. On 18 February 1948 Amoy foundered outside Port La Nouvelle, on a voyage from Oran to Sète with a cargo of oranges. Two lives were lost; 28 crew and 6 passengers were rescued. The wreck was cleared later in 1948.

== See also ==
- Clearance of the wreck of Amoy in 1948 (Port La Nouvelle official site)
