= German submarine U-167 =

U-167 may refer to one of the following German submarines:

- SM U-167, a Type U 93 submarine launched in 1918; served in World War I until surrendered on 18 April 1919; broken up at Grays in 1921
- German submarine U-167 (1942), a Type IXC/40 submarine that served in World War II until scuttled on 6 April 1943; raised in 1951 and transferred to Spain; used commercially for filming; broken up
