= Arthur Palliser =

Royal Navy Admiral (1890–1956)

Admiral Sir Arthur Palliser KCB DSC
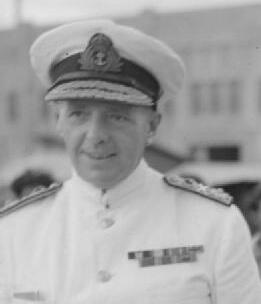
- Rear Admiral Arthur Palliser on the quayside at Singapore Naval Base, 2 December 1941
- Born: 20 July 1890; Richmond, Surrey
- Died: 22 February 1956 (aged 65); Kensington, London
- Military career
- Allegiance: United Kingdom
- Branch: Royal Navy
- Service years: 1907–1948
- Rank: Admiral
- Commands: East Indies Station
- Conflicts: First World War; Second World War
- Awards: Knight Commander of the Order of the Bath; Distinguished Service Cross; Mentioned in Despatches

Admiral Sir Arthur Francis Eric Palliser, KCB, DSC (20 July 1890 – 22 February 1956) was a prominent Royal Navy officer during the Second World War.

== Early life and career ==
Palliser was born in Richmond, Surrey, the son of Arthur Palliser and Hester Brenda Boord. He was educated at Bradfield College, joined the Royal Navy (RN) as a naval cadet in 1905 and was trained at the Royal Naval College, Dartmouth and Royal Naval College, Greenwich. By 1911, he had achieved the rank of lieutenant.

Following service during the First World War, Palliser was awarded the Distinguished Service Cross and Croix de Guerre avec Palme in 1917. He was promoted to lieutenant commander in 1919. In 1921, Palliser married Margaret Eva King Salter, with whom he had a son and a daughter. From 1923 to 1925 he attended HMS Excellent, a gunnery school at Portsmouth. In 1927–1928, Palliser attended a staff course at the Royal Naval Staff College, Greenwich. During 1930–1932, he achieved the rank of captain and spent brief periods as fleet gunnery officer, Mediterranean, executive officer of the battlecruiser HMS Tiger, with the Atlantic Fleet and as commander of the destroyer HMS Blanche, in the Mediterranean.

During 1934–1935, he attended the Royal Naval War College at Greenwich, followed by an appointment as chief of staff to the Commander-in-Chief, China (1936–1938). Palliser returned to the gunnery school at Excellent, as commander, in 1938–1940.

== Second World War ==
Palliser commanded the battleship HMS Malaya in 1940–1941 and was an Aide de Camp to King George VI during the same period. In 1941, he was appointed Chief of Staff to the Commander-in-Chief of the British Eastern Fleet, Admiral Sir Thomas Phillips. During early 1942, as a rear admiral, Palliser became deputy commander of Naval Forces, in the American-British-Dutch-Australian Command (ABDACOM) – a short-lived joint command for Allied forces in South East Asia and the South West Pacific – under the US Admiral Thomas C. Hart and the Dutch admiral Conrad Helfrich. Later that year, he was appointed Flag Officer and Fortress Commander at Trincomalee Garrison and also served in a staff position with the Royal Indian Navy at New Delhi. On 2 February 1943 he was Mentioned in Despatches for "good services in the South West Pacific" (a term used in British circles for ABDACOM).

During 1943, he returned to the UK to command the 1st Cruiser Squadron. In 1944, Palliser was made Fourth Sea Lord and Chief of Supplies and Transport, a position he held until 1946. From 1946 he held the position of Commander-in-Chief, East Indies Station. Palliser was made Knight Commander of the Bath in 1945, and was made an admiral in 1947. Palliser retired in 1948 and died on 22 February 1956 in Kensington, London.

== Notes ==
Military offices
Preceded by Frank Pegram	Fourth Sea Lord; 1944–1946	Succeeded by Sir Douglas Fisher
Preceded by Sir Clement Moody	Commander-in-Chief, East Indies Station; 1946–1948	Succeeded by Sir Charles Woodhouse
