= LÉ Cliona =

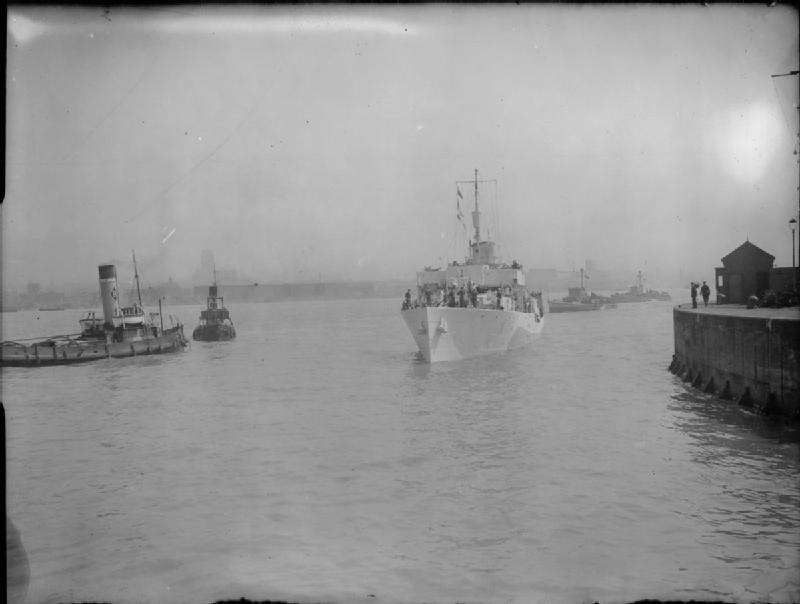
- HMS Bellwort entering Victoria Wharf, Birkenhead during World War II

History

United Kingdom
- Name: HMS Bellwort
- Namesake: Bellwort
- Ordered: 12 December 1939
- Yard number: J1160
- Laid down: 17 September 1940
- Launched: 11 August 1941
- Commissioned: 20 November 1941
- Decommissioned: 1947
- Identification: Pennant number: K114
- Fate: Sold to the Irish Naval Service, 1946

Ireland
- Name: LÉ Cliona
- Namesake: Cliodhna
- Acquired: 3 February 1947
- Commissioned: 3 February 1947
- Decommissioned: 2 November 1970
- Identification: Pennant number: 03
- Fate: Scrapped, 1970

General characteristics
- Class & type: Flower-class corvette
- Displacement: 925 long tons
- Length: 205 ft (62 m)
- Beam: 33 ft (10 m)
- Draught: 11 ft 6 in (3.51 m)
- Propulsion: single shaft; 2 × fire tube Scotch boilers; 1 × 4-cycle triple-expansion reciprocating steam engine; 2,750 ihp (2,050 kW)
- Speed: 16 knots (30 km/h; 18 mph)
- Armament: 1 × BL 4 inch Mk IX naval gun; 2 × .50 cal machine gun (twin); 2 × Lewis .303 cal machine gun (twin); 2 × Mk.II depth charge throwers; 2 × Depth charge rails with 40 depth charges; originally fitted with minesweeping gear, later removed

LÉ Cliona was a Flower-class corvette in the Irish Naval Service. She was named after Cliodhna, an ancient Irish goddess of love; she was the former HMS Bellwort. She was one of three Flowers sold to Ireland in 1946 and was handed over to the Irish Naval Service on 3 February 1947 and commissioned Cliona by Lieutenant Walter J. Reidy the same day. She was sold to Haulbowline Industries for scrap on 4 November 1970.

== Construction ==
Bellwort was built by George Brown & Co of Greenock, Scotland. After wartime service in the Royal Navy she was handed over to the Naval Service on 3 February 1947 and commissioned Cliona by Lieutenant Walter J. Reidy the same day. She was sold to Haulbowline Industries for scrap and was removed to Passage West on 4 November 1970.

== Service history ==
From March 1942 onwards Bellwort served with close escort groups on South Atlantic convoys, stationed at Freetown. In three years Bellwort sailed with 42 trade convoys (outbound and homebound), contributing to the safe and timely arrival of more than 800 merchant ships. She was involved in one major convoy battle, around Convoy TS 37 in April 1943, which saw the loss of seven ships in one night. With the end of hostilities Bellwort was decommissioned and in 1946 she was sold.

== Fire incident ==
On 29 May 1962, Cliona was participating in an annual exercise south off Roches Point. Cliona had a press party including a number of RTÉ cameras embarked to do some filming for the new national broadcaster. The ship initially carried out a successful Hedgehog mortar exercise. During her second pattern of depth charges, she suffered a premature explosion from a charge dropped from the port stern rail. The resulting explosion lifted the stern of the ship out of the water and the concussion ruptured fuel oil feed pipes in the after boiler room.

The leaking oil resulted in a serious fire which rapidly accelerated out of control. Stoker William Mynes closed the feed valves, isolating the supply of fuel to the fire. The Executive Officer, Lt. Pat O'Mahony, then entered the aft boiler room where he fought the fire for at least another thirty minutes. The fire was eventually extinguished, despite the Marine Rescue Coordination centre dispatching an oceangoing tugboat, Clonmel to the scene to assist, Cliona was able to proceed to Haulbowline under her own steam for an investigation and repairs. At the time, neither Mynes or O'Mahoney were recognised for the bravery they showed in their fire fighting effort. However, 'scrolls of commendation' were issued in recognition of the crew member's efforts some decades later.
