= HMS Bridgewater (L01) =

Royal Navy ship

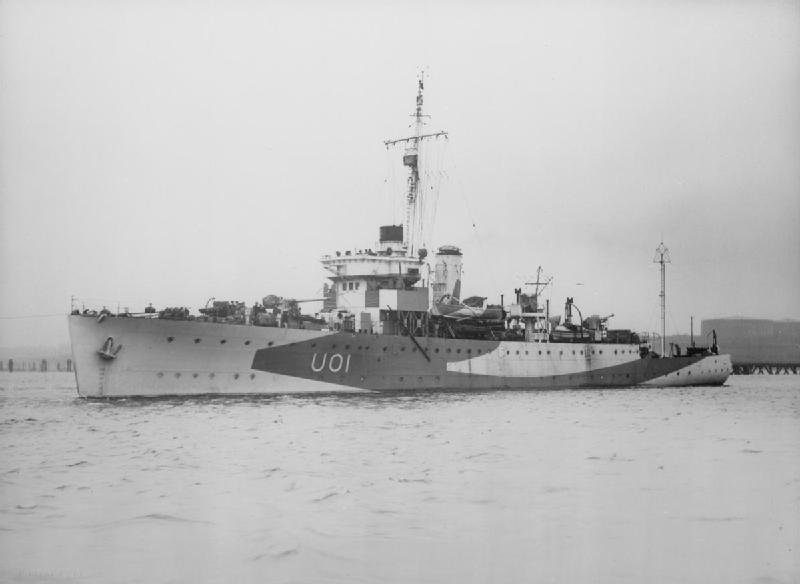
- Bridgewater at anchor, January 1943

History

United Kingdom
- Name: Bridgewater
- Namesake: Town of Bridgwater
- Ordered: 19 September 1927
- Builder: Hawthorn Leslie, Newcastle upon Tyne
- Laid down: 6 February 1928
- Launched: 14 September 1928
- Commissioned: 14 March 1929
- Out of service: July 1945
- Honours and awards: North Sea 1942; Atlantic 1942–43
- Fate: Sold for scrap, 22 May 1947
- Badge: On a Field Gold, three castles on a bridge, all Silver, below a star and a fleur-de-lys Gold.

General characteristics (as built)
- Class & type: Bridgewater-class sloop
- Displacement: 1,045 long tons (1,062 t) (standard); 1,600 long tons (1,600 t) (full load)
- Length: 266 ft 4 in (81.2 m) (o/a)
- Beam: 34 ft (10.4 m)
- Draft: 11 ft 5 in (3.5 m) (deep load)
- Installed power: 2,000 shp (1,500 kW); 2 Admiralty 3-drum boilers
- Propulsion: 2 shafts; 2 geared steam turbine sets
- Speed: 16.5 knots (30.6 km/h; 19.0 mph)
- Complement: 96
- Armament: 2 × single QF 4 in (102 mm) Mk V guns; 4 × depth charges, 2 chutes

HMS Bridgewater (L01) was the lead ship of her class of sloops built for the Royal Navy in the 1920s. Completed in 1929, the ship was initially assigned to the China Station and then joined the Commander-in-Chief, Africa in 1935. During the Second World War, Bridgewater spent most of her time on convoy escort duties off the West African coast although she did play a minor role in the Battle of Dakar in 1940. She was replaced in that role before the end of the war by more modern ships and was relegated to training duties in the UK. The ship was reduced to reserve shortly after the end of the war and was sold for scrap in 1947.

== Construction and design ==
HMS Bridgewater was ordered from Hawthorn Leslie on 19 September 1927, one of two Bridgwater-class sloops ordered from Hawthorn Leslie that day. The Bridgewaters were intended as replacements for the Flower-class sloops, and were to combine the role of peacetime patrol work at distant overseas stations (with the Bridgewaters being specifically intended for service in the Persian Gulf) with a wartime role as minesweepers.

Bridgewater was 266 feet 4 inches (81.18 m) long overall and 250 feet (76 m) between perpendiculars, with a beam of 34 feet (10 m) and a draught of 11 feet 5 inches (3.48 m). Displacement was 1,045 long tons (1,062 t) standard and 1,600 long tons (1,600 t) full load. The ship was powered by two Parsons geared steam turbines, each driving one propeller shaft, using steam provided by two Admiralty three-drum boiler. The turbines developed a total of 2,000 shaft horsepower (1,500 kW) and were designed to give a maximum speed of 16.5 knots (30.6 km/h; 19.0 mph). The main armament consisted of a pair of QF four-inch (102 mm) Mk V guns on the ship's centreline, one forward and one aft, with the forward gun on a high-angle mount, capable of anti-aircraft fire and the second gun on a low-angle mount, for anti-surface use only. Two 3-pounder saluting guns were also carried, while the anti-submarine armament initially consisted of four depth charges. The ship's crew consisted of 96 officers and ratings.

Bridgewater was laid down at Hawthorn Leslie's Tyneside shipyard on 6 February 1928 and was launched without ceremony on 14 September. Bridgewater reached a speed of 17.24 knots (31.93 km/h; 19.84 mph) during sea trials and was commissioned on 14 March 1929.

In 1938, the aft four-inch gun was replaced by one on a high-angle mounting and the two saluting guns were exchanged for a pair of quadruple Vickers 0.5 in (12.7 mm) anti-aircraft (AA) machineguns mounts. By the outbreak of the Second World War, the ship had been fitted with ASDIC, and the depth charge outfit was increased to 15 charges.

== Service ==
While ordered for service in the Persian Gulf, both Bridgewater and her sister ship Sandwich were first deployed to the China Station. In early August 1930, Bridgewater ferried troops of the Green Howards to Hankou, formerly site of a British concession, in response to threats posed by the fighting of the Central Plains War to foreigners. In 1931 Bridgewater, along with the survey ships Herald and Iroquois carried out a survey of the shallow area of the South China Sea known as the Dangerous Ground as part of a search for potential secret seaplane bases in case of war. In August 1931 she took part in the search for the missing cargo ship Kwong Sang, which had been sunk by a typhoon off Taichow Island.

Bridgewater remained on the China Station until 1935, when she came under the Commander-in-Chief, Africa (who in September 1939 became Commander-in-Chief, South Atlantic). The ship returned to Devonport Dockyard on 1 September 1936 for a month's refit and then returned to Simonstown. Bridgewater had her second high-angle four-inch gun installed during a refit there. It was interrupted by the Munich Crisis of September 1938 when she was ordered to Freetown, Sierra Leone. The ship later resumed her refit and remained in South Africa until she returned to Devonport for another refit on 13 April 1939. It was completed on 17 May when Bridgewater began a leisurely cruise back to South Africa and arrived there in August.

=== Second World War ===
When the Second World War began in the following month, the ship was briefly transferred to Freetown for convoy escort duties before returning to South Africa. She returned to Freetown in January 1940 and remained there until she needed her bottom cleaned in June. On 13 September, Bridgewater rendezvoused with a convoy that was carrying troops intended to capture Dakar from the Vichy French, and resumed her former duties after its unsuccessful conclusion. The lack of docking facilities in Freetown forced the ship to return to Simonstown to have her hull cleaned in February 1941 and January 1942. In July, she escorted a convoy to the UK and then began a lengthy refit that saw her Vickers .50 machine guns replaced by a pair of 20-millimeter (0.8 in) Oerlikon light AA guns, a Type 271 surface-search radar was installed and she also received a HF/DF radio direction finder mounted on a pole mainmast. (Note: Hague appears to have accidentally switched the dates between Bridgewater and her sister, Sandwich, in his book because the dates for the armament and sensor changes as they do not match when the ships were docked for refits.)

Bridgewater returned to Freetown on 9 October, having covered Convoy OS 42 en route. In December, she escorted the badly damaged light cruiser Phoebe to Trinidad and returned in January 1943. End March 1943 she was part of the escort of the badly mauled convoy RS-3. In September 1943 the ship escorted Convoy SL 136 to Liverpool and began a refit at Southampton that was intended to prepare her for convoy work with the 40th Escort Group in the Atlantic Ocean. Bridgewater's radar suite was upgraded with an improved Type 271Q radar and the addition of a Type 291 aircraft search radar. Her light AA armament was augmented by another pair of Oerlikons and she received a Hedgehog anti-submarine spigot mortar. However, the ship proved to be too worn out for her intended duties and she was transferred to the 3rd Submarine Flotilla where she served as a target ship for the rest of the war. Bridgewater was reduced to reserve in July 1945 at Ardrossan and was subsequently used for static bomb trials. The ship was sold for scrap on 22 May 1947 and subsequently broken up at Gelliswick Bay, Milford Haven by Howells.
