= German submarine U-159 =

U-159 may refer to one of the following German submarines:

- SM U-159, a Type U 158 submarine launched in 1918 during World War I but unfinished at the end of the war; broken up
- German submarine U-159 (1941), a Type IXC submarine that served in the Second World War until sunk on 28 July 1943
