= German submarine U-130 =

U-130 may refer to one of the following German submarines:

- SM U-130, a Type U 127 submarine laid down during the First World War but unfinished at the end of the war; broken up incomplete 1919–20
  - During the First World War, Germany also used this submarine with a similar name:
    - SM UB-130, a Type UB III submarine launched in 1918 and that served in the First World War until surrendered on 26 November 1918; used for French underwater explosion tests; broken up at Toulon in July 1921
- German submarine U-130 (1941), a Type IXC submarine that served in the Second World War until it was sunk on 12 March 1943
