= German submarine U-126 =

U-126 may refer to one of the following German submarines:

- SM U-126, a Type UE II submarine launched in 1918 that served in the First World War until surrendered on 22 November 1918; broken up at Upnor in 1923.
  - During the First World War, Germany also had this submarine with a similar name:
    - SM UB-126, a Type UB III submarine launched in 1918 and surrendered on 24 November 1918; used for French underwater explosion tests; broken up at Toulon in July 1921.
- German submarine U-126 (1940), a Type IXC submarine that served in the Second World War until sunk on 3 July 1943.
