= Frank Pegram =

Royal Navy admiral

Vice-Admiral Frank Pegram CB DSO
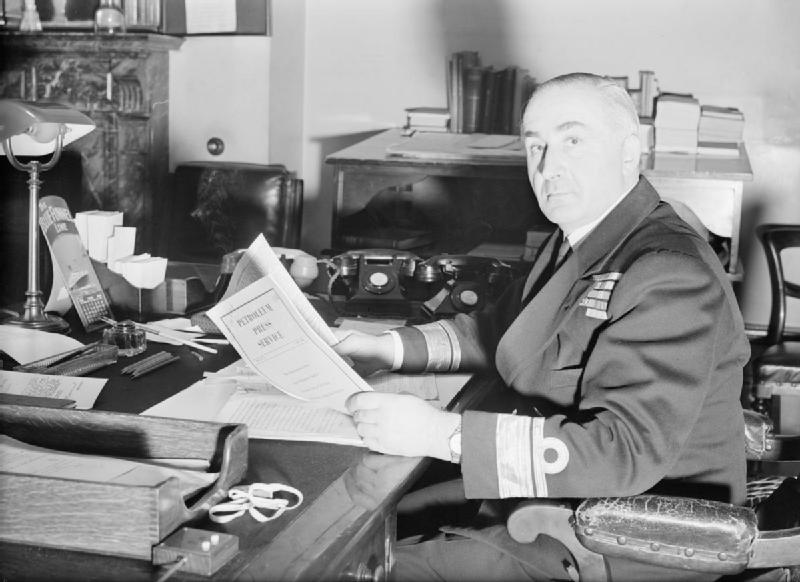
- Born: 25 February 1890; Lancashire, England
- Died: 8 March 1944 (aged 53); Bristol, England
- Military career
- Allegiance: United Kingdom
- Branch: Royal Navy
- Rank: Vice-Admiral
- Commands: HMS Glasgow; Flag Officer, West Africa; Fourth Sea Lord and Chief of Naval Supplies and Transport
- Conflicts: World War II
- Awards: Companion of the Order of the Bath

Vice-Admiral Frank Henderson 'Rammer' Pegram, CB, DSO (25 February 1890 – 8 March 1944) was a British Royal Navy officer who played a prominent role in the Norwegian campaign during World War II, and became Fourth Sea Lord and Chief of Naval Supplies and Transport.

== Naval career ==
Pegram was born in Lancashire, England and joined the navy in 1905. He served in World War I aboard the predreadnought HMS Hibernia and was present during the Gallipoli bombardment. In 1917 he served aboard the battlecruiser HMS Lion and in 1918 he was Gunnery Officer aboard HMS General Craufurd, a monitor bombarding German targets along the Belgian coast. For this service he received the Belgian Croix de guerre.

Between the wars Pegram had a number of shore and seagoing appointments, including a period as executive officer of the battleship HMS Malaya.

On 10 July 1939, Pegram took up his appointment as commanding officer of HMS Glasgow, a cruiser, and held this position until April 1940. As such, he saw active service in the battles surrounding the German invasion of Norway. The Glasgow was in the waters off Scandinavia early in the war and participated in the search for the German passenger liner SS Bremen. In February 1940, she captured the German trawler Herrlichkeit off Tromsø.

Pegram made three daring voyages into Norwegian ports with the threat of German air attack. The first was to land troops at Harstad in the far north of the country. Pegram then took the Glasgow into Namsos and landed a detachment of Royal Marines to block enemy troops until the main British forces arrived, during the Namsos Campaign. Finally, Pegram made a bold run under air attack into Molde in southern Norway to evacuate King Haakon VII, much of the Norwegian Cabinet and senior government leaders as well as a good portion of the gold reserves of Norway.

From 1940 to 1942, Pegram commanded Royal Navy forces, first in the South Atlantic and then appointed Flag Officer, West Africa from August 1942 to May 1943, flying his flag from HMS Cumberland.

In May 1943 he was appointed Fourth Sea Lord and Chief of Naval Supplies and Transport until March 1944. He died in the Royal Naval Hospital in Bristol on 8 March 1944, leaving his widow, Rosali Benoni (nee Addison). He was cremated at Golders Green Crematorium, London.

Military offices
Preceded by Sir John Cunningham	Fourth Sea Lord; 1943–1944	Succeeded by Sir Arthur Palliser
