= Flag Officer, West Africa =

- Active: 1942−1945
- Country: United Kingdom
- Branch: Royal Navy
- Type: Fleet
- Part of: Admiralty
- Garrison/HQ: Freetown, Sierra Leone

The Flag Officer, West Africa (FOWA) was a military command of the British Royal Navy during the Second World War. It existed from 1942 to 1945.

== The Royal Navy's prior history in West Africa ==
During the 19th century, the West Africa Squadron was created, primarily as an anti-slavery effort. Later the Cape of Good Hope Station at Simonstown, South Africa, merged with the West Coast of Africa Station to create the Cape of Good Hope and West Africa Station for the periods 1857–1865 and 1867–1920.

- 1807: British slave trade illegal
- 1808: First RN anti-slavery patrol, West Africa Squadron, ships on "particular service"
- 1819: West African Station an independent command under a Commodore
- 1840: West African Station still independent, but not under a Commodore
- 1842: West African Station once more commanded by a Commodore
- 1857-1865: West African Station again combined with Cape of Good Hope Station
- 1866: West African Station an independent command again
- 1867 West Africa/Preventative Squadron is disbanded
- 1867-1920 Ships in West Africa under control of Commander-in-Chief, Cape of Good Hope Station and West Africa Station
- 1942-1945 Flag Officer, West Africa operated from Freetown, Sierra Leone

== The Second World War ==
In 1941, escort forces began to be built up at Freetown. The post of Flag Officer, West Africa was established in August 1942 as part of the Admiralty re-organisation of commands. He initially controlled two corvettes and a few Free French ships. This was due to the growing importance of Freetown as a major base for convoy escorts. It existed until 1945.

== Flag Officers, West Africa ==
Post holders included:

	Rank	Flag	Name	Term	Notes
Flag Officer, West Africa
1	Vice-Admiral	Vice-Admiral - Royal Navy	Frank Pegram	August 1942 – May 1943	
2	Vice-Admiral	Vice-Admiral - Royal Navy	Bernard Rawlings	May – November 1943	
3	Vice-Admiral	Vice-Admiral - Royal Navy	Arthur Peters	November 1943–1945	

== Components ==
Distribution of units attached to station included:

	Unit	Date	Notes
1	18th Destroyer Flotilla	July 1941 – January 1942	2 sloops, 18 corvettes
2	18th Destroyer Flotilla	January–August 1942	2 sloops, 24 corvettes
3	18th Destroyer Flotilla	August 1942 – July 1943	2 sloops, 23 corvettes
4	18th Destroyer Flotilla	July 1943 – February 1944	15 destroyers, 2 sloops, 15 corvettes
5	18th Destroyer Flotilla	February–September 1944	6 destroyers, 7 sloops & frigates, 7 corvettes
6	55th Escort Group	September 1944 – May 1945	4/5 escort destroyers
7	56th Escort Group	September 1944 – May 1945	4/5 escort destroyers
8	57th Escort Group	September 1944 – May 1945	4/5 escort destroyers
9	58th Escort Group	September 1944 – May 1945	4/5 escort destroyers, 15 corvettes
10	59th Escort Group	September 1944 – May 1945	4/5 escort destroyers
11	60th Escort Group	September 1944 – May 1945	4/5 escort destroyers
