= German submarine U-106 =

U-106 may refer to one of the following German submarines:

- SM U-106, a Type U 93 submarine launched in 1917 and that served in the First World War until sunk on 7 October 1917 60 kilometres (37 mi) north of Terschelling in Netherlands.
  - During the First World War, Germany also had this submarine with a similar name:
    - SM UB-106, a Type UB III submarine launched in 1917 and surrendered on 26 November 1918; dumped on beach at Falmouth after explosive trials 1921 and broken up in situ
- German submarine U-106 (1940), a Type IXB submarine that served in the Second World War until sunk on 2 August 1943
