= Small nucleolar RNA SNORD43 =

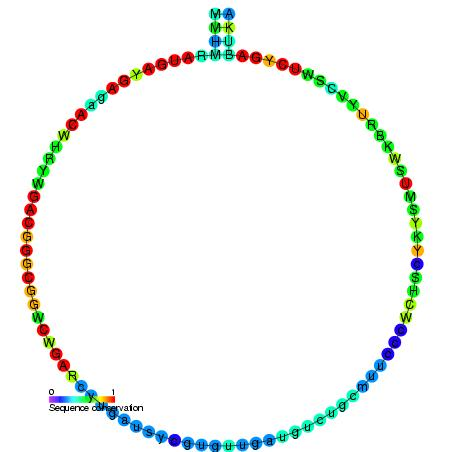
- Predicted secondary structure and sequence conservation of SNORD43

Identifiers
- Symbol: SNORD43
- Alt. Symbols: U43
- Rfam: RF00221

Other data
- RNA type: Gene; snRNA; snoRNA; CD-box
- Domain: Eukaryota
- GO: GO:0006396 GO:0005730
- SO: SO:0000593
- PDB structures: PDBe

In molecular biology, snoRNA U43 (also known as SNORD43) is a non-coding RNA (ncRNA) molecule which functions in the modification of other small nuclear RNAs (snRNAs). This type of modifying RNA is usually located in the nucleolus of the eukaryotic cell which is a major site of snRNA biogenesis. It is known as a small nucleolar RNA (snoRNA) and also often referred to as a guide RNA.

snoRNA U43 belongs to the C/D box class of snoRNAs which contain the conserved sequence motifs known as the C box (UGAUGA) and the D box (CUGA). Most of the members of the box C/D family function in directing site-specific 2'-O-methylation of substrate RNAs.

U43 is encoded in intron 1 of the ribosomal protein L3 gene in human and cow. Three other snoRNAs ( U82, U83a and U83b) are also encoded in the same host gene but from different introns. The Arabidopsis thaliana homologue is called snoR41 in the public sequence databases (Genbank). The rice homologue is expressed from a cluster also containing snoR16.

U43 is hypothesised to guide methylation of 2'-O-ribose residues on 18S ribosomal RNA.
