= SS Empire Galahad =

World War II merchant ship of the UK

- Murillo, seen here sometime between 1946 and 1952, was a later name of Empire Galahad.

History
- Name: SS Empire Galahad (1942–46); SS Celtic Star (1946); SS Murillo (1946–52); SS Bogliasco (1952–54); MV Bogliasco (1954–63); MV Ocean Peace (1963–67)
- Namesake: Sir Galahad (1942–46); Bartolomé Esteban Murillo (1946–52); Bogliasco, Italy (1954–63)
- Owner: MoWT (1942–46); Blue Star Line (1946); Lamport and Holt (1946–52); Industriale Maritime, Genoa (1952–63); Ocean Shipping & Enterprises (1963–67)
- Operator: Blue Star Line (1942–52); Thereafter owner-operated.
- Port of registry: (United Kingdom) Greenock (1942–52); (Italy) Genoa (1952–63); Panama (1963–67)
- Builder: Lithgows, Port Glasgow
- Yard number: 970
- Launched: 18 May 1942
- Completed: July 1942
- Out of service: 13 September 1967
- Identification: UK official number 168985 (1942–52); Call sign BDYN (1942–52)
- Fate: Scrapped at Kaohsiung, Taiwan, 1967

General characteristics
- Tonnage: 7,046 GRT; tonnage under deck; 4,230 NRT; 9,170 dwt
- Length: 432.2 ft (131.7 m)
- Beam: 56.2 ft (17.1 m)
- Draught: 36 ft 10 in (11.23 m)
- Depth: 34.2 ft (10.4 m)
- Propulsion: Until 1954 – 1 × triple-expansion steam engine, (J Kincaird & Co, Greenock).; After 1954 – 1 × 6-cylinder 2SC SA marine Diesel engine, (Cantieri Riuniti dell' Adriatico, Trieste).
- Speed: 10.5 knots (19.4 km/h)
- Sensors & processing systems: wireless direction finding; echo sounding device
- Armament: DEMS (1942–45)

SS Empire Galahad was a refrigerated cargo ship built in 1942 and scrapped in 1967. She was also called SS Celtic Star (1946), SS Murillo (1946–52), SS Bogliasco (1952–54), MV Bogliasco (1954–63) and MV Ocean Peace (1963–67). She was built as a steamship, but in 1954 she was converted into a motor ship. She was scrapped in Taiwan in 1967.

== Background ==
Empire ships were civilian vessels in UK Government service. Their names were all prefixed with "Empire". Mostly they were used during World War II by the Ministry of War Transport (MoWT), who owned the ships but contracted out their management to various shipping lines. Some ships requisitioned during the Suez Crisis were also given the Empire prefix. They were acquired from a number of sources. Many were built for the MoWT, others obtained from the USA, still others were captured or seized from enemy powers.

== History ==
Lithgows in Port Glasgow built Empire Galahad for the MoWT. She was launched on Monday 18 May 1942 and completed in July. Empire Galahad spent the war years under the management of Blue Star Line.

=== War service ===
Empire Galahad took part in the following convoys:

- SL 123, which sailed from Freetown, Sierra Leone on 23 September 1942 and arrived in the UK on 13 October 1942.
- SC 122, which sailed from New York on 5 March 1943 and arrived at Liverpool on 24 March. Empire Galahad was carrying general cargo, meat and a passenger. She joined this convoy from convoy HX 228.
- MKS 22, which sailed from Freetown on 14 August 1943 and arrived at Liverpool on 6 September. Empire Galahad was carrying a refrigerated cargo and also linseed.
- SL 143, which sailed from Freetown, Sierra Leone on 12 December 1943 and arrived in the UK on 5 January 1944.
- SL 157, which sailed from Freetown, Sierra Leone on 1 May 1944 and arrived in the UK on 23 May 1944.
- SL 169, which sailed from Freetown, Sierra Leone on 29 August 1944 and arrived in the UK on 16 September 1944.
- MKS 74, which sailed from Mediterranean on 31 December 1944 and arrived in the UK on 8 January 1945.
- KMS 83, which sailed from Liverpool on 6 February 1945 and arrived at Gibraltar on 12 February. Empire Galahad was in ballast, and sailed from Milford Haven, with an eventual destination of the River Plate She was armed with a 4.7 inches (120 mm) gun and eight machine guns.

=== Post war ===
In 1946 Blue Star bought her and renamed her Celtic Star, after a previous Celtic Star sunk by enemy action in 1943. Blue Star was part of the Vestey Group, and the ship was quickly transferred to another company in the group, Lamport and Holt. She was renamed Murillo, making her the second Lamport and Holt ship to carry that name.

In 1952 she was sold to Industriale Maritime, renamed Bogliasco and registered in Italy. In 1954, the original triple-expansion steam engine made by JG Kincaid of Glasgow was replaced with a six-cylinder two-stroke single cycle single-acting marine Diesel engine made by Cantieri Riuniti dell' Adriatico, Trieste. She served for a total of nine years before being sold in 1963 to Ocean Shipping & Enterprises, who renamed her Ocean Peaceand registered her in Panama.

She was sold for scrap in 1967, and arrived at Kaohsiung, Taiwan for scrapping on 12 September 1967.

== Official number and call sign ==
Official Numbers were a forerunner of IMO Numbers.

Empire Galahad's UK official number was 168985 and her call sign was BDYN.
