= German submarine U-103 =

U-103 may refer to one of the following German submarines:

- SM U-103, a Type U 57 submarine launched in 1917 and that served in the First World War until sunk 12 May 1918
  - During the First World War, Germany also had these submarines with similar names:
    - SM UB-103, a Type UB III submarine launched in 1917 and sunk after 14 August 1918
    - SM UC-103, a Type UC III submarine launched in 1918 and surrendered on 22 November 1918; broken up at Cherbourg in 1921
- German submarine U-103 (1940), a Type IXB submarine that served in the Second World War until taken out of service in March 1944; sunk on 15 April 1945
