= German submarine U-167 (1942) =

German World War II submarine

Coordinates: 06.20°S 111.28°E

History

Nazi Germany
- Name: U-167
- Ordered: 15 August 1940
- Builder: DeSchiMAG, Bremen
- Yard number: 706
- Laid down: 12 March 1941
- Launched: 5 March 1942
- Commissioned: 4 July 1942
- Fate: Scuttled, 6 April 1943

General characteristics
- Class & type: Type IXC/40 submarine
- Displacement: 1,144 t (1,126 long tons) surfaced; 1,257 t (1,237 long tons) submerged
- Length: 76.76 m (251 ft 10 in) o/a; 58.75 m (192 ft 9 in) pressure hull
- Beam: 6.86 m (22 ft 6 in) o/a; 4.44 m (14 ft 7 in) pressure hull
- Height: 9.60 m (31 ft 6 in)
- Draught: 4.67 m (15 ft 4 in)
- Installed power: 4,400 PS (3,200 kW; 4,300 bhp) (diesels); 1,000 PS (740 kW; 990 shp) (electric)
- Propulsion: 2 shafts; 2 × diesel engines; 2 × electric motors
- Speed: 19 knots (35 km/h; 22 mph) surfaced; 7.3 knots (13.5 km/h; 8.4 mph) submerged
- Range: 13,850 nmi (25,650 km; 15,940 mi) at 10 knots (19 km/h; 12 mph) surfaced; 63 nmi (117 km; 72 mi) at 4 knots (7.4 km/h; 4.6 mph) submerged
- Test depth: 230 m (750 ft)
- Complement: 4 officers, 44 enlisted
- Armament: 6 × torpedo tubes (4 bow, 2 stern); 22 × 53.3 cm (21 in) torpedoes; 1 × 10.5 cm (4.1 in) SK C/32 deck gun (180 rounds); 1 × 3.7 cm (1.5 in) SK C/30 AA gun; 1 × twin 2 cm FlaK 30 AA guns

Service record
- Part of: 4th U-boat Flotilla; 4 July – 30 November 1942; 10th U-boat Flotilla; 1 December 1942 – 6 April 1943
- Commanders: Kptlt. Kurt Neubert; 4 July 1942 – 8 February 1943; Lt.z.S. Günter Zahnow; 8 – 16 January 1943; K.Kapt. Kurt Sturm; 5 February – 6 April 1943
- Operations: 2 patrols: 1st patrol: 21 December 1942 – 16 January 1943; 2nd patrol: 27 February – 6 April 1943
- Victories: 1 merchant ship sunk (5,449 GRT); 1 merchant ship damaged (7,200 GRT)

German submarine U-167 was a Type IXC/40 U-boat of Nazi Germany's Kriegsmarine built for service during World War II. Her keel was laid down on 12 March 1941 by the Deutsche Schiff- und Maschinenbau AG in Bremen as yard number 706. She was launched on 5 March 1942 and commissioned on 4 July with Kapitänleutnant Kurt Neubert in command.

The U-boat's service began with training as part of the 4th U-boat Flotilla. She then moved to the 10th flotilla on 1 December 1942 for operations. She was a member of three wolfpacks. She sank one ship of 5,449 gross register tons (GRT) and damaged another of 7,200 GRT.

She was scuttled on 6 April 1943.

== Design and construction ==
German Type IXC/40 submarines were slightly larger than the original Type IXCs. U-167 had a displacement of 1,144 tonnes (1,126 long tons) when at the surface and 1,257 tonnes (1,237 long tons) while submerged. The U-boat had a total length of 76.76 m (251 ft 10 in), a pressure hull length of 58.75 m (192 ft 9 in), a beam of 6.86 m (22 ft 6 in), a height of 9.60 m (31 ft 6 in), and a draught of 4.67 m (15 ft 4 in). The submarine was powered by two MAN M 9 V 40/46 supercharged four-stroke, nine-cylinder diesel engines producing a total of 4,400 metric horsepower (3,240 kW; 4,340 shp) for use while surfaced, two Siemens-Schuckert 2 GU 345/34 double-acting electric motors producing a total of 1,000 metric horsepower (740 kW; 990 shp) for use while submerged. She had two shafts and two 1.92 m (6 ft) propellers. The boat was capable of operating at depths of up to 230 metres (750 ft).

The submarine had a maximum surface speed of 18.3 knots (33.9 km/h; 21.1 mph) and a maximum submerged speed of 7.3 knots (13.5 km/h; 8.4 mph). When submerged, the boat could operate for 63 nautical miles (117 km; 72 mi) at 4 knots (7.4 km/h; 4.6 mph); when surfaced, she could travel 13,850 nautical miles (25,650 km; 15,940 mi) at 10 knots (19 km/h; 12 mph). U-167 was fitted with six 53.3 cm (21 in) torpedo tubes (four fitted at the bow and two at the stern), 22 torpedoes, one 10.5 cm (4.13 in) SK C/32 naval gun, 180 rounds, and a 3.7 cm (1.5 in) SK C/30 as well as a 2 cm (0.79 in) C/30 anti-aircraft gun. The boat had a complement of forty-eight.

U-167 was laid down on 12 March 1941 at Seebeckwerft's Wesermünde shipyard, was launched on 5 March 1942 and commissioned on 4 July 1942.

== Service history ==
On commissioning, U-167 joined the 4th U-boat Flotilla at Stettin, Prussia (now Szczecin, Poland) for crew training. In December 1942, the submarine was assigned to the operational 10th U-boat Flotilla, leaving Kiel in Germany on 1 December and arriving at Bergen in Norway on 8 December 1942.

=== First patrol ===
The submarine's first patrol took her from Bergen on 21 December 1942, across the North Sea and into the Atlantic Ocean through the gap between Iceland and the Faroe Islands. U-167 joined Group Falke, a group of 14 U-boats deployed in a line south-east of Greenland intended to intercept westbound convoys. The weather was extremely poor, and on 8 January 1943 U-167 lost a man overboard when heavy seas hit the submarine, while the boat's commander, Kapitänleutnant Kurt Neubert, was badly injured, causing the patrol to be abandoned, with U-167 arriving at Lorient in occupied France, on 16 January.

=== Second patrol and loss ===
On 27 February 1943, U-167 left Lorient on her second patrol, with a new commanding officer, Korvettenkapitän Kurt Sturm. U-167 was directed to join attacks on the New York to Gibraltar convoy UGS 6. After sunset on 17 March 1943, U-167 attacked the convoy, torpedoing the American Liberty ship Molly Pitcher east of the Azores. Sturm claimed to have sunk Molly Pitcher, but the American ship remained afloat, and was sunk by U-521 next morning. U-167 was sent to join a patrol line south of the Canary Islands which was then moved to between the Canaries and North Africa to intercept the south-bound convoy RS-3. The convoy was sighted on 28 March, and that night U-167 sank the Moanda. (Note: U-boat.net states that U-167 sank the Lagosian, while Moanda was sunk by U-172.) Operations against RS 3 were abandoned on 30 March owing to the convoy having strong air cover, with U-167 remaining in the area between the Canaries and the African mainland.

On 5 April 1943, U-167 was attacked twice by Lockheed Hudson patrol aircraft of No. 233 Squadron RAF heavily damaging the submarine and badly wounding Sturm. As a result, the submarine was scuttled east of Gran Canaria on 6 April, with U-167's crew making their way ashore. They were briefly interned before being released for repatriation, being picked up by the submarine U-455 on the night of 13/14 April and being returned to France.

=== Post-war ===
The boat was raised in 1951 and taken to Spain. The submarine was used as a film set before being broken up.

== Summary of raiding history ==
Date	Ship	Nationality	Tonnage (GRT)	Fate
17 March 1943	Molly Pitcher	United States	7,200	Damaged
28 March 1943	Lagosian	United Kingdom	5,449	Sunk

== Bibliography ==
- Blair, Clay (2000). Hitler's U-Boat War: The Hunted 1942–1945. New York: Modern Library. ISBN 0-679-64033-9.
- Busch, Rainer; Röll, Hans-Joachim (1999). German U-boat commanders of World War II : a biographical dictionary. Translated by Brooks, Geoffrey. London, Annapolis, Md: Greenhill Books, Naval Institute Press. ISBN 1-55750-186-6.
- Busch, Rainer; Röll, Hans-Joachim (1999). Deutsche U-Boot-Verluste von September 1939 bis Mai 1945 [German U-boat losses from September 1939 to May 1945]. Der U-Boot-Krieg (in German). Vol. IV. Hamburg, Berlin, Bonn: Mittler. ISBN 3-8132-0514-2.
- Gröner, Erich; Jung, Dieter; Maass, Martin (1991). U-boats and Mine Warfare Vessels. German Warships 1815–1945. Vol. 2. Translated by Thomas, Keith; Magowan, Rachel. London: Conway Maritime Press. ISBN 0-85177-593-4.
- Kemp, Paul (1997). U-Boats Destroyed – German Submarine Losses in the World Wars. Arms & Armour Press. ISBN 1-85409-321-5.
- Wynn, Kenneth (2003) [1997]. U-Boat Operations of the Second World War: Volume 1: Career Histories, U1—U510. London: Caxton Editions. ISBN 1-84067-525-X.
