= German submarine U-67 =

U-67 may refer to one of the following German submarines:

- SM U-67, a Type U 66 submarine launched in 1915 and that served in the First World War until surrendered on 20 November 1918; broken up at Fareham in 1921
  - During the First World War, Germany also had these submarines with similar names:
    - SM UB-67, a Type UB III submarine launched in 1917 and surrendered on 24 November 1918; broken up at Swansea in 1922
    - SM UC-67, a Type UC II submarine launched in 1916 and surrendered on 16 January 1919; broken up at Briton Ferry in 1919–20
- German submarine U-67 (1940), a Type IXC submarine that served in the Second World War until sunk on 16 July 1943
