= German submarine U-117 =

U-117 may refer to one of the following German submarines:

- SM U-117, a Type UE II submarine launched in 1917 that served in World War I and was surrendered in 1918
  - During World War I, Germany also had this submarine with a similar name:
    - SM UB-117, a Type UB III submarine launched in 1917 and was surrendered in 1918
- German submarine U-117 (1941), a Type XB submarine that served in the Second World War and sank on 7 August 1943
