= German submarine U-43 =

U-43 may refer to one of the following German submarines:

- SM U-43 (Germany), the lead ship of the Type U 43 class of submarines; launched in 1914 and that served in the First World War until surrendered on 20 November 1918
  - During the First World War, Germany also had these submarines with similar names:
    - SM UB-43, a Type UB II submarine launched in 1916; transferred to Austria-Hungary and renamed U-43; surrendered on 6 November 1918
    - SM UC-43, a Type UC II submarine launched in 1916 and sunk on 10 March 1917
- German submarine U-43 (1939), a Type IX submarine that served in the Second World War until sunk on 30 July 1943
