= German submarine U-66 =

U-66 may refer to one of the following German submarines:

- SM U-66, the lead ship of the Type U 66 class of submarines; launched in 1915 and that served in the First World War until sunk on 3 September 1917
  - During the First World War, Germany also had these submarines with similar names:
    - SM UB-66, a Type UB III submarine launched in 1917 and went missing after 18 January 1918
    - SM UC-66, a Type UC II submarine launched in 1916 and sunk on 12 June 1917
- German submarine U-66 (1940), a Type IXC submarine that served in the Second World War until sunk on 6 May 1944
