= German submarine U-123 =

U-123 may refer to one of the following German submarines:

- SM U-123, a Type UE II submarine launched in 1918 and that served in World War I until surrendered on 22 November 1918; sunk on east coast of England on way to be broken up in 1921
  - During World War I, Germany also had this submarine with a similar name:
    - SM UB-123, a Type UB III submarine launched in 1918 and probably sunk by a mine on 19 October 1918
- German submarine U-123 (1940), a Type IXB submarine that served in World War II until she was taken out of service on 17 June 1944; scuttled on 19 August 1944; raised and became the French submarine Blaison (Q165); stricken on 18 August 1959
