= Small nucleolar RNA SNORA67 =

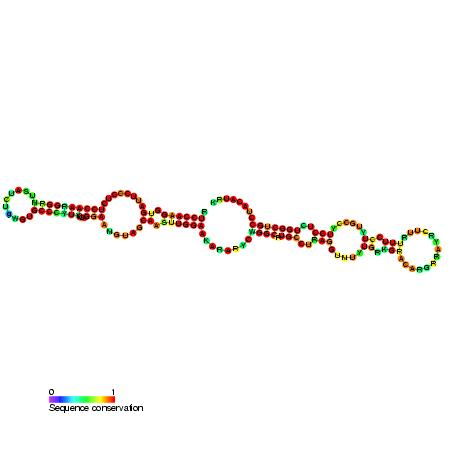
- Predicted secondary structure and sequence conservation of SNORA67

Identifiers
- Symbol: SNORA67
- Alt. Symbols: U67
- Rfam: RF00272

Other data
- RNA type: Gene; snRNA; snoRNA; HACA-box
- Domain: Eukaryota
- GO: GO:0006396 GO:0005730
- SO: SO:0000594
- PDB structures: PDBe

In molecular biology, snoRNA U67 is a non-coding RNA molecule that belongs to the H/ACA class of snoRNAs which are thought to guide the sites of modification of uridines to pseudouridines. This snoRNA guides pseudouridylation of position U1445 in 18S rRNA. This RNA is expressed from the intron of the host gene EIF4A1.
