= Bridgewater-class sloop =

1929 class of British sloops-of-war

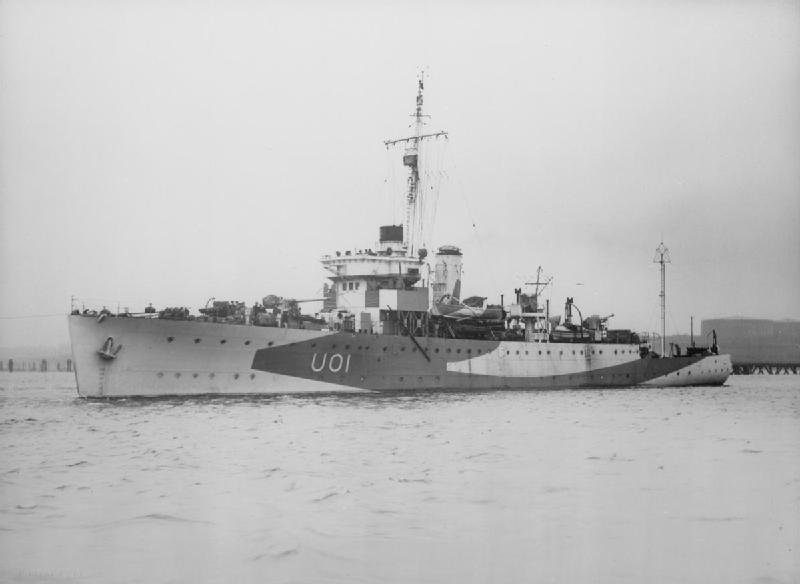
- HMS Bridgewater, pictured in January 1943

Class overview
- Name: Bridgewater class
- Builders: Hawthorn Leslie and Company, Hebburn
- Operators: Royal Navy
- Preceded by: 24 class
- Succeeded by: Hastings class
- In commission: 1929-1946
- Completed: 2
- Retired: 2

General characteristics
- Type: Sloop
- Displacement: 1,045 tons
- Length: 250 ft (76 m)
- Beam: 34 ft (10 m)
- Speed: 17 kn (31 km/h)
- Armament: 2 × 4-inch (102 mm)

The Bridgewater-class sloop was a class composed of two sloops built for the Royal Navy, HMS Bridgewater and HMS Sandwich. The ships were part of the Royal Navy's 1927 Build Programme as replacements for the Flower-class sloop.

== Design ==
The Bridgewater class displaced 1,045 tons and were armed with two 4-inch (102 mm). They could achieve speeds of 17 kn (31 km/h).

== Service ==
Both ships were ordered from Hawthorn Leslie and Company, Hebburn in September 1927. They entered service in 1929 and were based at first on the China Station. Bridgewater was moved to the Cape in 1935, while Sandwich remained in China until the outbreak of the Second World War in 1939. Both ships were active in the Battle of the Atlantic, Bridgewater being based at Freetown carrying out patrols and escorting convoys until November 1943, when she moved to cover the Western Approaches. For the last two years of the war she was used in submarine training activities. Sandwich was also used in home waters, being based out of Plymouth, Liverpool, and Freetown between 1940 and 1944, though by 1945 her condition had deteriorated so much that she was kept at Bizerta. Both ships were decommissioned after the war, with Sandwich being sold for scrapping in early 1946. Bridgewater was retained for slightly longer, being used for static bomb trials during 1946 and 1947, until being sold and broken up in May 1947.

== Ships ==
Name	Pennant	Ordered	Laid Down	Launched	Commissioned	Fate
Bridgewater	L01/U01	19 September 1927	6 February 1928	14 September 1928	14 March 1929	Sold on 22 May 1947
Sandwich	L12/U12	19 September 1927	9 February 1928	29 September	23 March 1929	Sold on 8 January 1946
