= List of U-boat flotillas =

The List of U-boat flotillas includes the German U-boat flotillas that served during both World Wars. The bases listed are those where the flotillas spent most of their operational careers. During World War II, submarine flotillas were often deployed for tactical purposes, unlike the surface flotillas of the Kriegsmarine, which were primarily administrative.

== World War I ==
This list contains the German U-boats flotillas during the First World War.

U-boat flotillas of World War I
Name	Type	Base
High Seas Fleet Flotillas	*	Wilhelmshaven
Flanders Flotillas	*	Bruges
Pola Flotilla (Adriatic)	*	Pula, Cattaro
Kurland Flotilla Baltic Sea	*	Libau
Constantinople Flotilla (Black Sea)	*	Constantinople

== World War II ==
This list contains the German U-boats flotillas during the Second World War. After 1941, the U-boat flotillas were in turn organized into U-boat regions.

U-boat flotillas of World War II
Emblem	Name	Type	Base
	1st U-boat Flotilla	Combat	Brest
	2nd U-boat Flotilla	Combat	Lorient
	3rd U-boat Flotilla	Combat	La Rochelle
	4th U-boat Flotilla	Training	Stettin
	5th U-boat Flotilla	Training	Kiel
	6th U-boat Flotilla	Combat	St. Nazaire
	7th U-boat Flotilla	Combat	St. Nazaire
	8th U-boat Flotilla	Training	Danzig
	9th U-boat Flotilla	Combat	Brest
	10th U-boat Flotilla	Combat	Lorient
	11th U-boat Flotilla	Combat	Bergen
	12th U-boat Flotilla	Combat	Bordeaux
	13th U-boat Flotilla	Combat	Trondheim
	14th U-boat Flotilla	Combat	Narvik
	18th U-boat Flotilla	Training	Hela
	19th U-boat Flotilla	Training	Pillau
	20th U-boat Flotilla	Training	Pillau
	21st U-boat Flotilla	Training	Pillau
	22nd U-boat Flotilla	Training	Gotenhafen
	23rd U-boat Flotilla	Combat/Training	Salamis/Danzig
	24th U-boat Flotilla	Training	Memel
	25th U-boat Flotilla	Training	Libau
	26th U-boat Flotilla	Training	Pillau
	27th U-boat Flotilla	Training	Gotenhafen
	29th U-boat Flotilla	Combat	La Spezia
	30th U-boat Flotilla	Combat	Konstanza
	31st U-boat Flotilla	Training	Hamburg
	32nd U-boat Flotilla	Training	Königsberg
	33rd U-boat Flotilla	Combat	Flensburg
