= List of U-boat regions =

The following list of U-boat regions pertains to the higher echelon commands for the U-boat flotillas during World War II. The regions were organized between 1941 and 1944 and were commanded by an officer known as the Führer der Unterseeboote for his particular region. Regions could contain as few as two flotillas with as many as ten.

== History ==
Before the outbreak of World War II, individual U-boat flotillas were under the direct command of a single Führer der Unterseeboote (F.d.U.) in the person of Karl Dönitz, who had also acted as commander of the 1st U-boat Flotilla. In 1939, Dönitz's title was renamed as the Befehlshaber der Unterseeboote (B.d.U.), to which all the flotillas directly reported.

The first U-boat region was created in Italy in November 1941 to provide local command authority for the U-boat flotillas operating in the Mediterranean Sea. The largest region, "Region West" headquartered in Paris, was established in 1942 to oversee U-boat activity during the Battle of the Atlantic.

Later war U-boat regions were created between 1943 and 1944 due to the various operational needs of the U-boat flotillas. The standard rank for a U-boat region commander was either Fregattenkapitän or Kapitän zur See. Towards the end of the war, a new office known as Kommandierender Admiral der Unterseeboote, was established by the Kriegsmarine to direct overall submarine operations. An office known as the Operationsabteilung (b.d.U.op) coordinated specific U-boat tactics.

In the last weeks of the war, when U-boat operations were mostly restricted to the North Sea around Norway, the Oberkommando der Marine (OKM) became the direct commander for the U-boat regions. Some flotillas overlapped between regions due to shifting base assignments and operational tasking.

== Atlantic U-boat regions ==
U-boat Region West - Führer der Unterseeboote West (F.d.U.West)

The F.d.U. West region was the largest U-boat command established during the Second World War. The region began in July 1942 as a legal affairs office known as the Gericht des Führer der Unterseeboote West. In 1943, the U-boat region was expanded under the command of Kapitän zur See Hans-Rudolf Rösing and moved its command to Angers.

At its height, the U-boat Region West held authority over ten U-boat flotillas. Day-to-day operations were overseen by two staff officers (1. und 2. Admiralstabsoffizier). The command also maintained an engineering office, an administrative office, and a medical department, as well as the original legal office.

Specific assigned flotillas were:

- 1st U-boat Flotilla
- 2nd U-boat Flotilla
- 3rd U-boat Flotilla
- 6th U-boat Flotilla
- 7th U-boat Flotilla
- 9th U-boat Flotilla
- 10th U-boat Flotilla
- 11th U-boat Flotilla
- 12th U-boat Flotilla
- 13th U-boat Flotilla

In August 1944, as the Germans withdrew from France, the staff of region west evacuated to Norway. The command technically existed until the end of the war, although its authority now overlapped with the North Sea U-boat regions.

U-boat Region Central - Führer der Unterseeboote Mitte (F.d.U.Mitte)

This U-boat region was formed in May 1944 solely for combating the anticipated Allied invasion of France. No flotillas were ever assigned, and the region disbanded after the Invasion of Normandy.

== Mediterranean U-boat regions ==
U-boat Region Italy - Führer der Unterseeboote Italien (F.d.U.Italien)

Existed from 1941 to 1943 before being renamed as the U-boat Region Mediterranean.

- 23rd U-boat Flotilla
- 29th U-boat Flotilla

U-boat Region Mediterranean - Führer der Unterseeboote Mittelmeer (F.d.U.Mittelmeer)

Received the 23rd and 29th flotillas from the Italian region due to restructuring in 1943. Eventually dwindled to only three U-boats assigned to the entire region. By the end of the war, the region was a paper command placed under the authority of the "Admiral Ägäis Division", part of Marinegruppenkommando Süd.

== North Sea U-boat regions ==
U-boat Region East - Führer der Unterseeboote Ost (B.d.U.Ost)

- 4th U-boat Flotilla
- 8th U-boat Flotilla
- 31st U-boat Flotilla
- 32nd U-boat Flotilla

U-boat Region Norway - Führer der Unterseeboote Norwegen (F.d.U.Norwegen)

The last U-boat region to be in operation was as of May 1945 when Germany surrendered.

- 11th U-boat Flotilla
- 13th U-boat Flotilla
- 14th U-boat Flotilla
- 29th U-boat Flotilla

U-boat Region North Sea - Führer der Unterseeboote Nordmeer (F.d.U.Nordmeer)

Made up of retreating U-boat flotillas during the German withdrawal from Occupied France. Shared exactly the same operational area with U-boat Region Norway and technically had command over the same flotillas.

== Asian U-boat regions ==
U-boat Area Southeast Asia - Chef im Südraum

This was a special U-boat region established in December 1944 and was an operational command authority for the Monsun Gruppe. The region was headquartered in Penang and was under the command of Fregattenkapitän Wilhelm Dommes.

== Training flotillas ==
The U-boat training flotillas were originally organized under a single U-boat training division (Unterseebootslehrdivisionen) and were later placed under the command of an office known as the F.d.U. Ausb. - Führer der U-Ausbildungsflottillen.

- 5th U-boat Flotilla – Training flotilla in Kiel
- 18th U-boat Flotilla – Training flotilla in Poland which performed combat operations in the Baltic Sea
- 19th U-boat Flotilla – Training flotilla in Kiel for prospective U-boat commanders
- 20th U-boat Flotilla – Training flotilla in the Baltic (Baltiysk)
- 21st U-boat Flotilla – Primary "basic training" flotilla for the U-boat service
- 22nd U-boat Flotilla – Training flotilla in Wilhelmshaven
- 24th U-boat Flotilla – Training flotilla in Danzig
- 25th U-boat Flotilla – Naval artillery training flotilla in Danzig
- 26th U-boat Flotilla – The U-boat service's torpedo training school
- 27th U-boat Flotilla – U-boat tactical operations training school

== Unassigned flotillas ==
Flotillas 15, 16, and 17 were scheduled for activation between 1942 and 1943 but were never organized and thus never assigned to a region. Flotilla 28 was ordered in 1944 and, likewise, never formed.

The 30th U-boat Flotilla operated independently in the Black Sea and was never assigned to a U-boat region. The last flotilla of the war (the 33rd U-boat Flotilla) also operated independently of a region.
