= List of shipwrecks in January 1943 =

The list of shipwrecks in January 1943 includes ships sunk, foundered, grounded, or otherwise lost during January 1943.

== 1 January ==
List of shipwrecks: 1 January 1943
Ship	State	Description
Arthur Middleton	United States	World War II: Convoy UGS 3: The Liberty ship was torpedoed and sunk in the Mediterranean Sea (35°45′N 0°45′W) by U-73 (Kriegsmarine) with the loss of 24 gunners, 43 crew, and twelve passengers, including all eleven crew of USS LCT-21 (United States Navy; on board as deck cargo). Three gunners were rescued by HMS Boreas (Royal Navy).
Brageland	Sweden	World War II: The cargo ship was torpedoed and sunk in the Atlantic Ocean (0°19′N 37°26′W) by U-163 (Kriegsmarine). Her 28 crew survived.
Empire March	United Kingdom	World War II: The cargo ship was torpedoed and sunk in the South Atlantic 150 nautical miles (280 km; 170 mi) north west of Tristan da Cunha by Michel (Kriegsmarine). Thirty-three of her crew were killed. Her master, and 24 of her crew were taken as prisoners of war.
Empire Panther	United Kingdom	World War II: The Design 1016 ship struck a mine and sank in the Irish Sea eight nautical miles (15 km; 9.2 mi) off Strumble Head, Pembrokeshire. Of the 48 men aboard, one sailor and three gunners were drowned.
Eros	Sweden	The Red Cross ship ran aground on the north west point of Polykandros, Greece and was wrecked. Her crew were rescued.
Hamildoc	Canada	The cargo ship broke in two while at anchor off Venezuela (9°10′N 60°30′W) and sank. There were no casualties.
MTB 105	Royal Navy	World War II: The Thornycroft MTB-104-class motor torpedo boat was scuttled by the Flower-class corvette HMCS Woodstock (Royal Canadian Navy) in the Atlantic Ocean after floating away from the sinking Special Service Vessel HMS Fidelity (Royal Navy), sunk by U-435 (Kriegsmarine) on 30 December 1942. Her eight crew were rescued.
Muansa	Germany	World War II: The cargo ship was torpedoed and sunk in Kongsfjord by L-20 (Soviet Navy). Nineteen of her crew were killed.
Novelist	United Kingdom	World War II: The cargo ship was bombed and damaged at Bône, Algeria. She was subsequently repaired and returned to service.
Renzan Maru	Japan	World War II: The cargo ship was torpedoed and sunk in the Pacific Ocean off Ruorisaki lighthouse, Honshū (39°11′N 141°44′E) by USS Porpoise (United States Navy) with the loss of 47 of her crew. Survivors were rescued by Delhi Maru (Imperial Japanese Navy).
Rhakotis	Germany	World War II: The blockade runner was shelled and sunk in the Atlantic Ocean 200 nautical miles (370 km; 230 mi) north west of Cape Finisterre, Spain by HMS Scylla (Royal Navy). Amongst those killed was one of the three survivors from City of Cairo at (23°30′S 5°30′W) (United Kingdom). The other two survivors were rescued by U-410 (Kriegsmarine) and were taken as prisoners of war.

== 2 January ==
List of shipwrecks: 2 January 1943
Ship	State	Description
HMS Alarm	Royal Navy	World War II: The Algerine-class minesweeper was bombed in the port of Bône, Algeria by Luftwaffe aircraft, and was later declared a total loss.
Ballot	Panama	The cargo ship ran aground off Kildin Island, Soviet Union. She was declared a total loss.
Ebon Maru	Imperial Japanese Navy	World War II: The guard ship (198 GRT) was torpedoed and sunk in the Bismarck Sea (4°30′S 151°30′E) by USS Argonaut (United States Navy).
Empire Metal	United Kingdom	World War II: The cargo ship was bombed and sunk at Bône by Junkers Ju 87 aircraft of II Staffeln, Sturzkampfgeschwader 3, Luftwaffe and Focke-Wulf Fw 190 aircraft of III Staffeln, Schlachtgeschwader 10, Luftwaffe. Six crew were killed. She was raised in August 1949, but broke in two and was subsequently scrapped.
F 162	Kriegsmarine	World War II: The MFP-A landing craft was sunk by a mine in the Kerch Strait with the loss of two of her crew.
USS Grebe	United States Navy	The fleet tug, a former Lapwing-class minesweeper, was destroyed by a typhoon during 1–2 January 1943 at Vuata Vatoa, Fiji Islands after becoming grounded while attempting to salvage Thomas A. Edison (United States).
St. Merriel	United Kingdom	World War II: The cargo ship was bombed and sunk at Bône by Junkers Ju 88 aircraft of the Luftwaffe. Five or six of her 58 crew were killed. She was bombed again on 9 February 1943 and broke in two. St. Merriel was refloated on 12 December 1948 and beached at "Grenovillere". The stern section sank off Cape Noli on 4 August 1950 while in tow to the breakers.
Thomas A. Edison	United States	The Liberty ship was destroyed by a typhoon during 1–2 January 1943 at Vuata Vatoa, Fiji Islands after becoming grounded on 4 December 1942.

== 3 January ==
List of shipwrecks: 3 January 1943
Ship	State	Description
Baron Dechmont	United Kingdom	World War II: The cargo ship was torpedoed and sunk in the Atlantic Ocean north west of Cape San Roque, Brazil (3°11′S 38°41′W) by U-507 (Kriegsmarine) with the loss of seven of her 44 crew. Her captain was taken prisoner and died when U-507 was sunk on 13 January 1943.
British Vigilance	United Kingdom	World War II: Convoy TM 1: The tanker straggled behind the convoy. She was torpedoed and damaged in the Caribbean Sea approximately 900 nautical miles (1,700 km; 1,000 mi) north east of Barbados (20°58′N 44°40′W) by U-514 (Kriegsmarine) with the loss of 27 of her 54 crew. The ship was abandoned and the survivors were rescued by HMS Saxifrage (Royal Navy). British Vigilance was torpedoed and sunk on 24 January (approximately 21°N 45°W) by U-105 (Kriegsmarine).
HMS LCP(L) 17	Royal Navy	The landing craft personnel (large) was destroyed by fire at Chittagong, India.
Ulpio Traiano	Regia Marina	World War II: Operation Principal: The Capitani Romani-class cruiser was sunk at Palermo, Sicily by a Royal Navy human torpedo.
Viminale	Italy	World War II: Operation Principal: The troopship was severely damaged at Palermo, Italy by a Chariot manned torpedo.

== 4 January ==
List of shipwrecks: 4 January 1943
Ship	State	Description
Barrister	United Kingdom	The cargo ship ran aground at Inishark, County Galway, Ireland and broke in two. She was declared a total loss.
HNoMS Bodø	Royal Norwegian Navy	World War II: The naval whaler struck a mine and sank in the North Sea off Aberdeen, United Kingdom. Thirty of her 32 crew lost their lives, the survivors being rescued by a British trawler. HNoMS Bodø was returning from a special operation to Norway.
Hellas	Norway	The cargo ship sank in a storm in Benghazi harbour, Libya. She was a total loss. There were no casualties.
Jenny Moller	United Kingdom	The cargo ship was beached at Benghazi. She was declared a constructive total loss.
Lyeemoon	Hong Kong	The cargo ship was driven ashore during a gale at Benghazi and became a wreck.
M 4242	Kriegsmarine	World War II: The minesweeper was torpedoed and sunk in the Bay of Biscay (43°55′N 00°42′W) by USS Shad (United States Navy).
Schokland	Kriegsmarine	The Dutch cargo ship, under German command, carrying sacks of cement and iron girders and 284 troops returning from leave, sank after hitting a reef one mile (1.6 km) off Portelet Bay, Jersey, Channel Islands. One hundred and six of the troops, who had been in a hold, died.

== 5 January ==
List of shipwrecks: 5 January 1943
Ship	State	Description
Keifuku Maru	Imperial Japanese Army	World War II: The Daifuku Maru No. 1-class auxiliary transport ship was bombed and sunk at Rabaul, New Britain by Boeing B-17 Flying Fortress and Consolidated B-24 Liberator aircraft of the United States Fifth Air Force. Three of her crew were killed.
John Marshall	United States	The Liberty ship ran aground 3 nautical miles (5.6 km) south of Portpatrick, Wigtownshire, United Kingdom. She was refloated on 7 January and towed to the Clyde for repairs.
HMS LCP(M) 17	Royal Navy	The landing craft personnel (medium) was lost off the Isle of Wight.

== 6 January ==
List of shipwrecks: 6 January 1943
Ship	State	Description
Kotohira Maru	Japan	World War II: United States Army Air Force aircraft sank the cargo ship off Holtz Bay on the coast of Attu Island in the Aleutian Islands, Territory of Alaska. There were 120 dead and only two survivors.
HMS LCT 106	Royal Navy	The Mk. 2 landing craft, tank was sunk by heavy weather in the port of Benghazi, Libya.
HMS LCT 107	Royal Navy	The Mk. 2 landing craft, tank was sunk by heavy weather in the port of Benghazi, Libya.
Montreal Maru	Imperial Japanese Army	World War II: The Nanman Maru-class auxiliary transport ship was sunk in the Bering Sea north of Kiska, Territory of Alaska (53°28′N 177°52′E) by a United States Navy Consolidated PBY Catalina flying boat. There were no survivors. She was carrying 831 passengers including 216 soldiers of the Imperial Japanese Army's 302 Independent Battalion, 76 engineers, 23 field hospital men, 64 gunners and 93 crewmen.
U-164	Kriegsmarine	World War II: The Type IXC submarine was depth charged and sunk in the Atlantic Ocean off Pernambuco, Brazil (1°58′S 39°22′W) by a Consolidated PBY Catalina aircraft of the United States Navy with the loss of 54 of her 56 crew.
USS YP-492	United States Navy	The patrol boat was sunk in the Atlantic Ocean off the east coast of Florida in a collision with USS YP-6713 (United States Navy).

== 7 January ==
List of shipwrecks: 7 January 1943
Ship	State	Description
Akabahra	Norway	World War II: Convoy MKS 5: The cargo ship was torpedoed and sunk in the Mediterranean Sea (37°07′N 4°38′E) by aircraft of Kampfgeschwader 26, Luftwaffe. Her 25 crew were rescued.
Benalbanach	United Kingdom	World War II: Convoy MKS 5: The troopship was torpedoed and sunk in the Mediterranean Sea (37°07′N 4°38′E) by aircraft of Kampfgeschwader 26, Luftwaffe with the loss of 410 of the 472 people on board. She was on a voyage from the Clyde to Bône, Algeria.
Bersagliere	Regia Marina	World War II: The Soldati-class destroyer was sunk by American aircraft at Palermo, Sicily, with the loss of 59 of her crew.
HMT Horatio	Royal Navy	World War II: The Shakespearian-class trawler was torpedoed and sunk in the Mediterranean Sea off Cape de Garde, Algeria by S 58 (Kriegsmarine). Only two of her 33 crew survived the sinking; they were rescued by S 58 and made prisoners of war.
HMT Jura	Royal Navy	World War II: The Isles-class trawler was torpedoed and sunk in the Mediterranean Sea 35 nautical miles (65 km) north east of Algiers, Algeria (36°58′N 03°48′E) by U-371 (Kriegsmarine) with the loss of seventeen of her 37 crew. Survivors were rescued by HMT Stronsay (Royal Navy).
Majestic	United States	The cargo ship was stranded at Key West, Florida.
Myoko Maru	Imperial Japanese Army	Myoko Maru World War II: Operation 18: The troopship was bombed and damaged by Allied aircraft and was beached at Malahang, Papua New Guinea (06°49′S 147°04′E). She was bombed again the next day and destroyed. Two gunners were killed.
Nichiryu Maru	Imperial Japanese Army	World War II: Operation 18: The cargo ship was bombed and sunk off Lae, New Guinea (06°30′S 149°00′E) by a Consolidated PBY Catalina of 11 Squadron. Royal Australian Air Force. Survivors were rescued by Maikaze (Imperial Japanese Navy). According to one source, there were 456 dead and missing and 85 wounded. According to another 29 crew and 589 soldiers died.

== 8 January ==
List of shipwrecks: 8 January 1943
Ship	State	Description
RFA Albert L. Ellsworth	Royal Fleet Auxiliary	World War II: Convoy TM 1: The tanker was torpedoed and damaged (27°57′N 28°50′W) by U-436 (Kriegsmarine). Afire from bow to stern, she was abandoned by her 42 crew, who were rescued by HMS Havelock (Royal Navy). RFA Albert L. Ellsworth was shelled and sunk by U-436 the next day.
M 489	Kriegsmarine	World War II: The Type 1940 minesweeper was sunk at Rotterdam by sabotage. She was raised on 10 January, repaired, and returned to service.
Meliskerk	Netherlands	The cargo ship ran aground off Port St. Johns, Union of South Africa. She was a total loss.
Oltenia II	United Kingdom	World War II: Convoy TM 1: The tanker was torpedoed and sunk in the Caribbean Sea (27°59′N 28°50′W) by U-436 (Kriegsmarine) with the loss of seventeen of her 60 crew. Survivors were rescued by HMS Havelock (Royal Navy).
RD 56	Regia Marina	World War II: The RD-class minesweeper was bombed and damaged at Bizerta, Tunisia by Allied aircraft. There were no casualties. She was run aground, to prevent her from sinking, but sank the next day. RD 56 was later raised, but was bombed and sunk again three months later.
Yorkwood	United Kingdom	World War II: The cargo ship was torpedoed and sunk in the Atlantic Ocean off Macau, Brazil (4°10′S 35°30′W) by U-507 (Kriegsmarine) with the loss of one of her 48 crew. Her captain was taken aboard U-507 as a prisoner of war and died when U-507 was sunk on 13 January 1943.

.

== 9 January ==
List of shipwrecks: 9 January 1943
Ship	State	Description
Birmingham City	United States	World War II: Convoy TB 1: The cargo ship was torpedoed and sunk in the Atlantic Ocean (7°23′N 55°48′W) by U-124 (Kriegsmarine) with the loss of ten of her 56 crew. Survivors were rescued by USS PC-577 (United States Navy)
Brasil	Sweden	World War II: The cargo ship struck a mine and sank in the North Sea south of Stavanger, Norway. Her 42 crew survived.
Broad Arrow	United States	World War II: Convoy TB 1: The tanker was torpedoed and sunk in the Atlantic Ocean (7°35′N 55°45′W) by U-124 (Kriegsmarine) with the loss of 23 of her 47 crew. Survivors were rescued by USS PC-577 (United States Navy).
Collingsworth	United States	World War II: Convoy TB 1: The cargo ship was torpedoed and sunk in the Atlantic Ocean (7°12′N 55°37′W) by U-124 (Kriegsmarine) with the loss of twelve of her 55 crew. Survivors were rescued by Dalvangen (Norway) and USS PC-577 (United States Navy).
Corsaro	Regia Marina	World War II: The Soldati-class destroyer struck a mine and sank in the Mediterranean Sea with the loss of 187 lives. There were 48 survivors.
Emilio Morandi	Italy	World War II: The cargo ship was torpedoed and sunk in the Mediterranean Sea off the coast of Tunisia by HMS Umbra (Royal Navy). There were 66 dead and 32 survivors.
Empire Lytton	United Kingdom	World War II: Convoy TM 1: The Norwegian-type tanker was torpedoed and sunk in the Atlantic Ocean (28°08′N 28°20′W) by U-442 with the loss of fourteen of her 48 crew. Survivors were rescued by HMS Havelock and HMS Saxifrage (both Royal Navy).
Empire Spruce	United Kingdom	The Maple type tug collided with a Royal Navy ship and sank in the Firth of Clyde with the loss of four of her six crew. She was refloated on 23 February. Subsequently repaired and returned to service.
Louise Lykes	United States	World War II: The Type C2-F cargo ship was torpedoed and sunk in the Atlantic Ocean (56°15′N 22°00′W) by U-384 (Kriegsmarine) with the loss of all 83 crew.
RFA Minister Wedel	Royal Fleet Auxiliary	World War II: Convoy TM 1: The tanker was torpedoed and sunk in the Atlantic Ocean (28°08′N 28°20′W) by U-522 (Kriegsmarine). Her 38 crew were rescued by HMS Havelock (Royal Navy).
Minotaur	United States	World War II: Convoy TB 1: The cargo ship was torpedoed and sunk in the Atlantic Ocean (7°12′N 55°37′W) by U-124 (Kriegsmarine) with the loss of six of her 52 crew. Survivors were rescued by USS PC-577 (United States Navy).
Norvik	Panama	World War II: Convoy TM 1: The tanker was torpedoed and sunk in the Atlantic Ocean 500 nautical miles (930 km) west of Tenerife, Spain (28°08′N 28°20′W) by U-522 (Kriegsmarine) with the loss of two of her 45 crew.
S-104	Kriegsmarine	World War II: The Type 1939/40 schnellboot was sunk by a mine in the English Channel. One of her crew was killed and four were wounded.
Sveajarl	Sweden	World War II: The cargo ship struck a mine and sank in the North Sea south of Stavanger (58°48′N 3°36′E) with the loss of 37 of her 40 crew. Seven more sailors from the cargo ship Ecuador (Sweden) died while trying to help the shipwrecked from Sveajarl.
William Wilberforce	United Kingdom	World War II: The cargo ship was torpedoed and sunk in the Atlantic Ocean west of the Canary Islands, Spain (29°20′N 26°53′W) by U-511 (Kriegsmarine) with the loss of three of her 63 crew. Survivors were rescued by Monte Arnabal (Spain).
Yoshinogawa Maru	Imperial Japanese Navy	World War II: The Keishin Maru-class auxiliary transport ship was torpedoed and sunk east of Bougainville Island, Papua New Guinea (6°10′S 156°00′E) by USS Nautilus (United States Navy). Eight crewmen were killed. Survivors were rescued by Kisaragi Maru (Imperial Japanese Navy).

== 10 January ==
List of shipwrecks: 10 January 1943
Ship	State	Description
USS Argonaut	United States Navy	World War II: The Argonaut-class submarine was depth charged, shelled and sunk in the Pacific Ocean south of the Bismarck Archipelago, Papua New Guinea by Hamakaze, Isokaze and Maikaze (all Imperial Japanese Navy). There were no survivors from her 102 crew.
Calino	Italy	World War II: The cargo ship was sunk by an Italian mine in the Mediterranean Sea off Capri (42°32′N 14°10′E). Five of her crew were killed.
Dalny	Germany	World War II: The cargo ship was torpedoed and damaged in the Mediterranean Sea off San Remo, Italy, by HMS Tribune, and was beached. Her crew were rescued. The wreck was attacked several times by submarines and aircraft, including Aréthuse (French Navy) before being towed to Toulon and scuttled there in August 1944. The wreck was scrapped in 1945.
Dorothy	United States	The scow sank off Fort Glenn, on the northeast coast of Umnak Island in the Aleutian Islands, Territory of Alaska.
Empire Ford	United Kingdom	The coaster ran aground off Seahouses, Northumberland and was abandoned by her crew. She floated off the next day, but came ashore in the Farne Islands and sank. She was refloated on 27 February. Subsequently repaired and returned to service.
Marie Ferndinand	Germany	World War II: The cargo ship struck a mine off Steinort. She was declared a total loss.
Norwalk	United States	The cargo ship was sunk north of Cuba (23°18′N 80°00′W) in a collision with Nidareid (Norway). A crew member was killed.
Ocean Vagabond	United Kingdom	The Ocean ship was torpedoed and sunk in the Atlantic Ocean (57°17′N 20°11′W) by U-186 (Kriegsmarine).
Okikaze	Imperial Japanese Navy	Okikaze sinking, seen through the periscope of USS Trigger World War II: The Minekaze-class destroyer was torpedoed and sunk in the Pacific Ocean off Katsura (35°02′N 140°12′E) by USS Trigger (United States Navy) with the loss of most of her 148 crew.

== 11 January ==
List of shipwrecks: 11 January 1943
Ship	State	Description
British Dominion	United Kingdom	World War II: Convoy TM 1: The tanker straggled behind the convoy. She was torpedoed and damaged in the Atlantic Ocean by U-522 (Kriegsmarine) with the loss of 37 of her 53 crew. Survivors abandoned ship and were rescued by HMS Godetia (Royal Navy). British Dominion was later torpedoed and sunk (30°30′N 19°55′W) by U-620 (Kriegsmarine).
Erie Maru	Japan	World War II: The cargo ship was torpedoed and sunk in the South China Sea (32°56′N 132°02′E by USS Sturgeon (United States Navy).
Ocean Vagabond	United Kingdom	World War II: Convoy SC 115: The Ocean ship straggled behind the convoy. She was torpedoed and sunk in the Atlantic Ocean (57°17′N 20°11′W) by U-186 (Kriegsmarine) with the loss of one of her 47 crew. Survivors were rescued by HMS Wanderer (Royal Navy).
USS PT-43	United States Navy	World War II: The Elco 77' PT boat was shelled and damaged off Guadalcanal, Solomon Islands (09°15′S 159°42′E) by Hatsukaze, and Tokitsukaze (both Imperial Japanese Navy). A crew member was killed. The empty boat grounded on Japanese-held shore and was destroyed the next day by gunfire from the corvette HMNZS Kiwi (Royal New Zealand Navy).
USS PT-112	United States Navy	World War II: The Elco 80' PT boat was shelled and sunk off Guadalcanal, (09°15′S 159°42′E) by Hatsukaze, and Tokitsukaze (both Imperial Japanese Navy). Her crew survived.
Vittoria Beraldo	Italy	World War II: The coaster was torpedoed and sunk in the Mediterranean Sea by HMS Turbulent (Royal Navy).

== 12 January ==
List of shipwrecks: 12 January 1943
Ship	State	Description
Ardente	Regia Marina	The Ciclone-class torpedo boat was sunk in a collision with Grecale (Regia Marina) off Capo San Vito, Sicily. One hundred and eighteen of her 162 crew were killed, as were five crew from Grecale and around 70 German soldiers aboard her.
C. S. Flight	United Kingdom	World War II: The sailing ship was shelled and sunk in the Caribbean Sea (12°25′N 63°00′W) by U-105 (Kriegsmarine) with the loss of 49 of her 72 crew.
HMT Kingston Jacinth	Royal Navy	World War II: The naval trawler struck a mine and sank in the English Channel off Plymouth, Devon. Twenty of her crew were killed.
Patrol Boat No. 1	Imperial Japanese Navy	World War II: The patrol boat, a former Minekaze-class destroyer, was torpedoed and sunk in the Pacific Ocean off New Hanover Island, Bismarck Archipelago (02°51′S 149°43′E) by the submarine USS Guardfish (United States Navy).
USS PT-28	United States Navy	The Elco 77' PT boat ran aground at Dora Harbor, Unimak Island, Territory of Alaska, without casualties. Attempts to recover her in the next days failed and she was wrecked.
USS Worden	United States Navy	USS Worden The Farragut-class destroyer was driven onto rocks at Constantine Harbor, Amchitka Island, Territory of Alaska and was wrecked with the loss of fourteen of her 186 crew.

== 13 January ==
List of shipwrecks: 13 January 1943
Ship	State	Description
Ailsa	United Kingdom	World War II: The steel sailing barge (67 GRT) was sunk by a mine in Whittaker Channel, England. Both crew were saved.
Iwasiro Maru	Japan	World War II: The cargo ship was torpedoed and sunk in the Pacific Ocean between Kwajalein and Truk, Marshall Islands (09°54′N 167°07′E) by USS Wahoo (United States Navy) with the loss of 23 of her crew (probably all hands).
U-224	Kriegsmarine	World War II: The Type VIIC submarine was depth charged, rammed and sunk in the Mediterranean Sea west of Algiers, Algeria (36°28′N 0°49′E) by HMCS Ville de Quebec (Royal Canadian Navy) with the loss of 45 of her 46 crew.
U-507	Kriegsmarine	World War II: The Type IXC submarine was depth charged and sunk in the Atlantic Ocean 330 nautical miles (610 km; 380 mi) off Cape Saint Rocque, Brazil (1°38′S 39°52′W) by a Consolidated PBY Catalina aircraft of the United States Navy with the loss of all 54 people aboard.
Unnamed fishing vessel	Japan	World War II: The fishing vessel was sunk in the Mayu River by HMIS ML 438 and HMIS ML 476 both (Royal Indian Navy).
Virgo	Sweden	World War II: The cargo ship struck a mine and sank in the North Sea off Borkum, Germany, with the loss of one of her 27 crew. One of the survivors later died from his wounds.

== 14 January ==
List of shipwrecks: 14 January 1943
Ship	State	Description
Ganjitsu Maru No. 1 Go	Imperial Japanese Navy	World War II: The auxiliary submarine chaser was torpedoed and sunk in the Pacific Ocean by USS Searaven (United States Navy). Sixteen sea rescue sailors, three gunners and about eight crewmen were killed.
Narvalo	Regia Marina	World War II: The submarine was torpedoed and sunk in the Mediterranean Sea south east of Malta (34°08′N 16°04′E) by HMS Pakenham (Royal Navy) and a Bristol Beaufort aircraft of the Royal Air Force. Twenty-nine crew, eleven Italian military passengers and eight Allied prisoners of war were killed. The British rescued 32 crew and 3 prisoners of war.
Oued Tiflet	Germany	World War II: The cargo ship was torpedoed and sunk in the Mediterranean Sea off Loano, Italy by HMS Sahib (Royal Navy). There were seventeen survivors and one person reported missing.
Shiraha Maru	Imperial Japanese Army	World War II: The Shiraha Maru-class auxiliary transport was torpedoed and sunk in the Pacific Ocean (9°32′N 130°42′E) by USS Searaven (United States Navy). Sixteen passengers and eleven of her crew were killed.
UJ 1107 Star XX	Kriegsmarine	The submarine chaser/naval whaler collided with Dessau (Germany) and sank off the Rotvær Lighthouse, Norway. One source gives four of her crew were killed, another says there were sixteen dead and 21 survivors.
V 703 Henry Fricke	Kriegsmarine	The Vorpostenboot ran aground during a storm in the port of Alderney, Channel Islands, and was wrecked. Her crew were rescued.
Wyetown	United Kingdom	The cargo ship (624 GRT) sprang a leak in bad weather, foundered and sank off the Suffolk coast (52°13′N 1°56′W). All 14 crew were rescued.

== 15 January ==
List of shipwrecks: 15 January 1943
Ship	State	Description
Annitsa	Greece	World War II: The cargo ship was torpedoed and sunk in the Mediterranean Sea (33°02′N 21°58′E) by U-617 (Kriegsmarine) with the loss of one of her 34 crew. Survivors were rescued by HMT Southern Isles (Royal Navy).
Harboe Jensen	Norway	World War II: The cargo ship was torpedoed and sunk in the Mediterranean Sea (33°04′N 21°50′E) by U-617 (Kriegsmarine) with the loss of eighteen of her 24 crew. The survivors were rescued by HMT Southern Isles (Royal Navy).
HMS LCP(L) 80	Royal Navy	The landing craft personnel (large) sank in a storm in English waters.
Mapele	United States	The cargo ship was wrecked at Cape Devine (55°22′45″N 160°09′00″W) in the Shumagin Islands, Territory of Alaska. A crew member and one of the embarked United States Navy Armed Guard perished; the other 48 people aboard were rescued by USS Discoverer (United States Navy).
Nichimei Maru	Imperial Japanese Army	World War II: Convoy S-28: The cargo ship was carrying Japanese troops and Allied prisoners of war. She was sunk 200 nautical miles (370 km) south southwest of Rangoon, Burma (13°30′N 97°30′E) by Consolidated B-24 Liberator aircraft of the 7th Bombardment Group's 9th Bomb Squadron, Tenth Air Force, United States Army Air Force. Five gunners and crewmen, 97 Japanese soldiers and 39 Dutch prisoners were killed. Nine hundred and twenty-five prisoners and 1,465 Japanese were rescued by Moji Maru (Imperial Japanese Army).
Ocean Courage	United Kingdom	World War II: The Ocean ship was torpedoed and sunk in the Atlantic Ocean 200 nautical miles (370 km; 230 mi) south of the Cape Verde Islands, Portugal (10°52′N 23°28′W) by U-182 (Kriegsmarine) with the loss of 52 of her 58 crew. Survivors were rescued by Silverwalnut (United Kingdom).
UJ 1406	Kriegsmarine	World War II: The Mob-FD-class naval trawler/submarine chaser was bombed and sunk at Lorient, Morbihan, France during a Royal Air Force air raid.

== 16 January ==
List of shipwrecks: 16 January 1943
Ship	State	Description
D'Annunzio	Italy	World War II: The cargo ship was shelled and sunk in the Mediterranean Sea south of Lampedusa (33°44′N 11°30′E) by HMS Kelvin and HMS Nubian (both Royal Navy). There were ten survivors from around 300 men aboard.
Emma	Italy	World War II: The cargo ship was torpedoed the day before in the Mediterranean Sea (40°37′N 13°47′E) by HMS Splendid (Royal Navy) and heavily damaged. The submarine torpedoed her again in the morning while she was being towed to Naples and this time her ammunition cargo exploded and she sank southwest of Capri. Only seven of the around 350 men aboard (crew and Italian and German soldiers) survived. The explosion also killed eight men and wounded 22 aboard the two tugs that were towing her.
F 174	Kriegsmarine	The MFP-A landing craft sank in a storm in the Baltic Sea (59°02′N 21°38′W) while under tow by the icebreaker Nordlicht (Estonia), which rescued her crew.
Kimposan Maru	Imperial Japanese Navy	World War II: The Kinjosan Maru-class auxiliary transport was torpedoed and sunk in the Pacific Ocean south west of Kavieng, New Ireland, eight nautical miles (15 km; 9.2 mi) north east of Los Reyes Island (02°47′S 149°10′E) by USS Greenling (United States Navy). Thirty-one of her crew were killed. Survivors were rescued by CH-17 (Imperial Japanese Navy).
Northholm	Canada	The cargo ship (447 GRT) foundered and sank in a gale northwest of Cape Scott, Vancouver Island, Canada. Fifteen of her crew died and only two survived.
Schenectady	United States	Schenectady The T2 tanker broke in two at Portland, Oregon. She was subsequently repaired and entered service in April 1943.
Tihuku Maru	Japan	World War II: The cargo ship was torpedoed and sunk in the Pacific Ocean north of Kavieng (04°03′N 151°55′E) by USS Growler (United States Navy). A crew member was killed.
UJ 2103	Kriegsmarine	The submarine chaser ran aground and was wrecked off Euboea, Greece.

== 17 January ==
List of shipwrecks: 17 January 1943
Ship	State	Description
Bombardiere	Regia Marina	World War II: The Soldati-class destroyer was torpedoed and sunk in the Mediterranean Sea northwest of Marettimo (38°15′S 11°43′E) by HMS United (Royal Navy). There were 175 dead and 49 survivors.
Heiyo Maru	Imperial Japanese Navy	World War II: The requisitioned cargo liner was torpedoed and sunk in the Pacific Ocean about 216 nautical miles (400 km; 249 mi) north of Truk, Caroline Islands (10°10′N 151°25′E) by USS Whale (United States Navy). Nine hundred troops and 44 of her crew were killed. Asayama Maru and Ataka Maru (both Imperial Japanese Navy) rescue 1,021 troops and 70 crew on 21 January.
Llanashe	United Kingdom	World War II: The cargo ship was torpedoed and sunk in the Indian Ocean south of Cape St. Francis, Union of South Africa (34°00′S 28°30′E) by U-182 (Kriegsmarine) with the loss of 33 of her 42 crew. Survivors were rescued by Tarakan (Netherlands). (Look 17/02/1943)
Ostende	Belgium	World War II: Convoy SC 115: The cargo ship either suffered an onboard explosion and sank in the Atlantic Ocean, or struck a mine in Loch Lathaich and was beached on the Isle of Mull. Her cargo of ammunition exploded. Two of her 48 crew were killed.
Polo	United Kingdom	The cargo ship exploded and caught fire at Bougie, Algeria. She was towed out of port the next day, before being shelled and sunk on 19 January.
Tevere	Regia Marina	World War II: The hospital ship ran aground at Tripoli, Libya. She was scuttled as a blockship on 20 January. She was refloated on 16 January 1950 and scrapped.
Tokachi Maru	Imperial Japanese Navy	World War II: The Tokachi Maru-class auxiliary collier was sunk by a Japanese mine west of Soerabaja, Java, Netherlands East Indies (06°50′S 112°12′E).
Vestfold	Panama	World War II: Convoy HX 222: The whale factory ship was torpedoed and sunk in the Atlantic Ocean (61°25′N 26°12′W) by U-268 (Kriegsmarine) with the loss of nineteen of the 75 people aboard. Survivors were rescued by Rathlin (United Kingdom). Three landing craft on board Vestfold, HMS LCT-2239, HMS LCT-2267 and HMS LCT-2344 (all Royal Navy), were also lost.
Yachiyo Maru	Japan	World War II: The coaster was torpedoed and sunk in the Pacific Ocean off the coast of Japan by USS Finback (United States Navy).
Zenobia Martini	Italy	World War II: The cargo ship was torpedoed and sunk in the Mediterranean Sea (33°56′N 11°06′E) by HMS Unseen (Royal Navy). There were seven dead and 48 survivors.

== 18 January ==
List of shipwrecks: 18 January 1943
Ship	State	Description
Algeria	Sweden	World War II: The cargo ship was bombed and sunk in the North Sea off Den Helder, North Holland, Netherlands by Allied aircraft with the loss of two of her 21 crew.
Ankara	Germany	World War II: The cargo ship struck a mine and sank in the Mediterranean Sea 5 nautical miles (9.3 km) north-east of Cani Island, Tunisia. All 109 crew and 118 passengers were rescued.
Favør	Germany	World War II: The cargo ship was torpedoed and sunk in the Mediterranean Sea south east of Sardinia, Italy, by HMS Loyal (Royal Navy).
Jan Mayen	Norway	The whaler ran aground off Leirabodi, Reykjavík, Iceland and was abandoned. Salvage was abandoned on 26 January and she subsequently broke up and sank.
Kalingo	Australia	World War II: The cargo ship was torpedoed and sunk in the Tasman Sea off the coast of New South Wales(34°07′S 153°15′E) by I-21 (Imperial Japanese Navy).
Lipscomb Lykes	United States	The cargo ship ran aground on the Durand Reef, south east of the Loyalty Islands, New Caledonia. She was a total loss.
Senzan Maru	Imperial Japanese Navy	World War II: The Tenzan Maru-class auxiliary transport was bombed and sunk in the Pacific Ocean off Kavieng, New Ireland (03°29′S 149°02′E) by a Consolidated B-24 Liberator aircraft of the United States Army Air Forces. Seven of her crew were killed. Survivors were rescued by CH-16 (Imperial Japanese Navy).
Sportivo	Italy	World War II: The cargo ship was torpedoed and sunk in the Mediterranean Sea (33°00′N 12°08′E) by HMS Unseen (Royal Navy). Her crew were rescued.
Tōei Maru	Imperial Japanese Navy	World War II: The auxiliary transport was torpedoed and sunk in the Pacific Ocean 100 miles (160 km) south west (06°21′N 150°23′E) of Truk, Caroline Islands by USS Silversides (United States Navy). Four of her crew were killed.
Yamafuku Maru	Japan	World War II: The cargo ship was bombed and sunk in the Shortland Islands, Solomon Islands by Boeing B-17 Flying Fortress and Bell P-39 Airacobra aircraft of the United States Army Air Force.

== 19 January ==
List of shipwrecks: 19 January 1943
Ship	State	Description
Commercio	Italy	World War II: The coaster was torpedoed and sunk in the Mediterranean Sea by HMS Splendid (Royal Navy).
Cleopatra	Regia Marina	World War II: The minesweeper was torpedoed and sunk in the Mediterranean Sea by HMS Splendid (Royal Navy).
Edda	Italy	World War II: The cargo ship was torpedoed in the Mediterranean Sea by HMS Unbroken (Royal Navy) and then sunk (33°45′N 11°12′E) by British aircraft. All 69 men aboard (43 crew, 22 gunners and four passengers) survived.
Eso	Regia Marina	World War II: The Galeb-class minelayer was bombed and sunk in the Mediterranean Sea off Tunis, Tunisia by British aircraft. There were 24 dead and 75 survivors.
Genyo Maru	Japan	World War II: The tanker was torpedoed and sunk in the Pacific Ocean off the coast of Japan by USS Haddock (United States Navy).
HH 05 Deli	Kriegsmarine	World War II: The naval drifter/patrol boat was torpedoed and sunk in the North Sea off the Hook of Holland, South Holland, Netherlands by Allied aircraft.
Myoho Maru	Imperial Japanese Army	World War II: Convoy No. 6 Go transportation convoy, Convoy No. 35, Part C: The Myoken Maru-class auxiliary transport ship was torpedoed and sunk in the Pacific Ocean north north east of Buin, Papua New Guinea (05°38′S 156°20′E) by USS Swordfish (United States Navy). Sixty-one troops and three of her crew were killed. Eight hundred survivors were rescued by Shigure (Imperial Japanese Navy).
San Giovanni Battista	Italy	World War II: The cargo ship, severely damaged by a torpedo in January 1942 and not repaired since, was scuttled as a blockship at Tripoli. She was later refloated and scrapped.
Seikai Maru	Japan	World War II: The cargo ship was torpedoed and sunk in the Pacific Ocean off the coast of Japan by USS Pollack (United States Navy).
Stromboli	Regia Marina	World War II: The military transport ship was shelled and sunk in the Mediterranean Sea by HMS Kelvin, HMS Nubian (both Royal Navy) and Vasilissa Olga (Hellenic Navy). There were seventeen dead and sixteen survivors.
Tritone	Regia Marina	World War II: The Flutto-class submarine was sunk in the Mediterranean Sea east of Algiers, Algeria (37°06′N 05°22′E) by HMS Antelope (Royal Navy) and HMCS Port Arthur (Royal Canadian Navy). Twenty-six crew were lost, 25 survivors were rescued and became prisoners of war.

== 20 January ==
For the loss of the American tanker Brilliant on this day, see the entry for 18 November 1942.

List of shipwrecks: 20 January 1943
Ship	State	Description
Assiria	Italy	World War II: The cargo ship was scuttled at Tripoli, Libya.
Asta	Sweden	World War II: The auxiliary sailboat was sunk by a mine off Råå. Both crew survived.
Giulia	Italy	World War II: The cargo ship was sunk at Tripoli by a limpet mine placed by Chariot XIII, operating from HMS Thunderbolt (Royal Navy).
Irma	Italy	World War II: The cargo ship was shelled and sunk in the Mediterranean Sea off Zuara, Libya by HMS Kelvin and HMS Jaguar (both Royal Navy).
Jean Jadot	Belgium	World War II: Convoy KMS 7: The cargo ship was torpedoed and sunk in the Mediterranean off Cape Ténès, Algeria by U-453 (Kriegsmarine) with the loss of 15 of the 414 people aboard. Survivors were rescued by HMS Verity (Royal Navy) and the fishing trawler Duguay Trouin (France).
Marco Foscarini	Italy	World War II: The cargo ship was scuttled at Tripoli.
Maria Angeletta	Regia Marina	World War II: The guard ship was torpedoed and sunk in the Mediterranean Sea by HMS Saracen (Royal Navy).
Marrochino	Italy	World War II: The cargo ship was scuttled at Tripoli.
Meiu Maru	Imperial Japanese Army	World War II: Convoy No. 6 Go transportation convoy, Convoy No. 35, Part C: The auxiliary transport ship was torpedoed and sunk in the Pacific Ocean 286 miles (460 km) off Truk, Caroline Islands (03°52′N 153°56′E) by USS Silversides (United States Navy). Four hundred troops and a crewman were killed. Survivors were rescued by CH-11 and Choun Maru No. 2 Go (both Imperial Japanese Navy).
Santorre Santarosa	Regia Marina	World War II: The submarine ran aground in the Mediterranean off Tripoli (32°55′N 13°11′E) on 19 January and then was torpedoed and severely damaged on 20 January by HMS MTB 260 (Royal Navy). Two of her crew were killed. Santorre Santarosa was scuttled on 21 January.
Somedomo Maru	Japan	World War II: The cargo ship was torpedoed and sunk in the Pacific Ocean (3°52′N 153°56′E) bu USS Silversides (United States Navy).
Surabaya Maru	Imperial Japanese Army	World War II: Convoy No. 6 Go transportation convoy, Convoy No. 35, Part C: The Indus Maru-class auxiliary transport was torpedoed and damaged in the Pacific Ocean (03°52′N 153°56′E) by USS Silversides (United States Navy). Four hundred and sixty-two troops, her captain and 36 crewmen were killed. Survivors were rescued by CH-11 and Choun Maru No. 2 Go (both Imperial Japanese Navy). Surabaya Maru was later scuttled by Asagumo (Imperial Japanese Navy).
Tanja	Germany	The coaster ran aground at Kirkenes, Norway and was wrecked.
Tevere	Italy	World War II: The cargo ship was scuttled at Tripoli.
Vesta	Sweden	World War II: The fishing boat was sunk by an underwater explosion, probably due to a mine, in the Kattegat. Her four crew were rescued.

== 21 January ==
List of shipwrecks: 21 January 1943
Ship	State	Description
Asama Maru	Japan	World War II: The cargo ship was torpedoed and sunk in the Pacific Ocean off the coast of Japan by USS Pollack (United States Navy).
Città di Genova	Regia Marina	World War II: The armed merchant cruiser was torpedoed and sunk in the Adriatic Sea by HMS Tigris (Royal Navy)
City of Marseilles	United Kingdom	The cargo ship was driven ashore off Batticaloa, Ceylon. She was a total loss.
Hampton Lodge	United Kingdom	World War II: The cargo ship was bombed and sunk in the Mediterranean Sea off the coast of Algeria (36°44′N 1°50′E) by aircraft of III Staffeln, Kampfgeschwader 26, Luftwaffe.
Kenkon Maru	Imperial Japanese Army	World War II: Convoy No. 6 Go transportation convoy, Convoy No. 35, Part B: The Kaihei Maru-class transport was torpedoed and damaged in the Pacific Ocean off New Georgia, Solomon Islands (6°12′S 155°51′E) by USS Gato (United States Navy). Thirty-six troops, seven of her crew, and an unknown number of passengers were killed. Survivors were rescued by Shirayuki (Imperial Japanese Navy). Convoy escorts scuttled Kenkon Maru.
No. 012	Soviet Navy	World War II: The MO-4-class patrol vessel was sunk on this date.
RD 31, RD 36, RD 37, and RD 39	Regia Marina	World War II: The RD-class minesweepers were sunk by HMS Kelvin and HMS Javelin (both Royal Navy) while trying to escape from Tripoli, Libya.
Saturno	Italy	World War II: The tanker was torpedoed and sunk in the Mediterranean Sea (37°16′N 10°28′E) by British aircraft based on Malta.
USS SC-709	United States Navy	The SC-497-class submarine chaser was wrecked at Louisbourg, Cape Breton Island, Nova Scotia, Canada.
Taiyu Maru No. 3	Imperial Japanese Navy	World War II: The picket ship was sunk in an air attack at Rabaul, New Guinea.
Tetsuzan Maru	Japan	World War II: The cargo ship was sunk in an air attack at Karavia Bay, Rabaul.
U-301	Kriegsmarine	World War II: The Type VIIC submarine was torpedoed and sunk in the Mediterranean Sea west of Bonifacio, Corsica, France (41°27′N 7°04′E) by HMS Sahib (Royal Navy) with the loss of 45 of her 46 crew.
Victory	United States	The fishing vessel was destroyed by fire near Gravina Point, just south of Ketchikan, Territory of Alaska (55°17′N 131°37′W).
William Hansen	Norway	World War II: The cargo ship was torpedoed and sunk in the Atlantic Ocean (46°56′N 52°47′W) by U-754 (Kriegsmarine) with the loss of ten of her nineteen crew.

== 22 January ==
List of shipwrecks: 22 January 1943
Ship	State	Description
D. J. Thornhill	Newfoundland	The schooner (147 GRT) sprang a leak in a gale and sank 50 miles off White Head, Nova Scotia. The whole crew was rescued by HMCS Dundas (Royal Canadian Navy).
Giuditta	Italy	World War II: The auxiliary sailboat/transport was captured by a Partisan boat and was burned.
Hassu Maru	Japan	World War II: The cargo liner was torpedoed and sunk in the Banda Sea by USS Tautog (United States Navy).
Mount Mycale	Greece	World War II: Convoy SC 117: The cargo ship straggled behind the convoy. She was torpedoed and sunk in the Atlantic Ocean (52°00′N 50°30′W) by U-413 (Kriegsmarine) with the loss of all 31 crew.
Neva	Sweden	World War II: Convoy UR 59: The cargo ship was torpedoed and sunk in the Atlantic Ocean south of Iceland (61°35′N 14°15′W) by U-358 (Kriegsmarine) with the loss of nineteen of her 21 crew. Survivors were rescued by HMT Cape Portland (Royal Navy).
HMAS Patricia Cam	Royal Australian Navy	World War II: The naval trawler was bombed and sunk off the Wessel Islands by a Japanese floatplane. Five of her crew and three aboriginal passengers were killed, drowned or died of wounds. Another passenger was captured by the Japanese, and was executed on 4 May 1943.
RD 33	Regia Marina	The RD-class minesweeper (207 GRT) foundered in a storm north of Plana Island, off the east coast of Tunisia with the loss of 18 of her 34 crew.
RD 43	Regia Marina	The RD-class minesweeper (203 GRT) foundered in a storm north of Plana Island, off the east coast of Tunisia with the loss of 3 of her crew.
Ruhr	Kriegsmarine	World War II: The transport ship was bombed and sunk off Bizerta, Tunisia by Allied aircraft with the loss of four lives.
Yashima Maru	Japan	World War II: The cargo ship was torpedoed and sunk in the Pacific Ocean by USS Tautog (United States Navy).

== 23 January ==
List of shipwrecks: 23 January 1943
Ship	State	Description
Alexandria	Egypt	World War II: The sailing ship was sunk in the Mediterranean Sea by U-431 (Kriegsmarine).
Benjamin Smith	United States	World War II: The Liberty ship was torpedoed and sunk in the Atlantic Ocean 50 nautical miles (93 km) off Cape Palmas, Liberia (4°05′N 7°50′W) by U-175 (Kriegsmarine). Her 66 crew survived.
D L Co. No. XXXIII	United States	The barge sank off Four Mountains Island, Aleutian Islands, Territory of Alaska (53°18′N 168°25′W).
F 152	Kriegsmarine	World War II: The Type A MFP landing craft was sunk by Allied fighter-bombers off Cap Bon, Tunisia. One of her crew was wounded.
Galilea	Germany	World War II: The cargo ship was torpedoed and sunk in the Mediterranean Sea off Tripoli, Libya by HMS Unseen (Royal Navy).
Hakaze	Imperial Japanese Navy	World War II: The Minekaze-class destroyer was torpedoed and sunk in the Gazelle Channel south of Kavieng, Papua New Guinea (2°47′S 150°38′E) by USS Guardfish (United States Navy). Thirteen of her crew were killed, 124 survivors were rescued by Akitsushima (Imperial Japanese Navy).
Luni	Italy	World War II: The tug was torpedoed and sunk in the Mediterranean Sea by HMS Unbending (Royal Navy).
R-44	Kriegsmarine	World War II: The Type R-41 minesweeper was bombed and sunk at Brest, Finistère, France by United States Eighth Air Force aircraft.
Viminale	Italy	World War II: The troopship was torpedoed and further damaged in the Mediterranean Sea (37°53′N 15°43′E) by HMS Unbending (Royal Navy). Viminale ran aground at Melito di Porto Salvo. She was under tow from Palermo, Sicily to Taranto.
USS YP-577	United States Navy	The yard patrol boat was destroyed by an explosion at the Great Lakes Naval Training Center, Illinois.

== 24 January ==
List of shipwrecks: 24 January 1943
Ship	State	Description
F 323	Kriegsmarine	World War II: The MFP-A landing craft was sunk by a mine in the Kerch Strait off "Eltingen" with the loss of thirteen of her fifteen crew.
Hans Schmidt	Germany	World War II: The cargo ship struck a mine and sank off Pola, Italy.
Harusame	Imperial Japanese Navy	Harusame after attack by USS Wahoo, photographed through Wahoo's periscope. World War II: The Shiratsuyu-class destroyer was torpedoed by USS Wahoo (United States Navy) and was beached to avoid sinking. She was salvaged and returned to service in late November 1943.
Kollbjørg	Norway	World War II: Convoy HX 223: The tanker broke in two in a storm and sank in the Atlantic Ocean (58°28′N 41°34′W) with the loss of eleven of her 36 crew. Survivors were rescued by Pan Maryland (United States). The bow section was scuttled on 26 January at 58°20′N 39°30′W by U-594 (Kriegsmarine).
Pistoia	Italy	World War II: The cargo ship was torpedoed and sunk in the Mediterranean Sea north north west of Ustica, Sicily by British aircraft based on Malta.
Ringstad	Norway	World War II: Convoy ON 55: The cargo ship straggled behind the convoy. She was torpedoed and sunk in the Atlantic Ocean 85 nautical miles (157 km) south east of Cape Race, Dominion of Newfoundland (45°50′N 51°04′W) by U-333 (Kriegsmarine) with the loss of 30 of her 43 crew. Survivors were rescued by USS Swanson (United States Navy). (Look 24/01/1942)
Teddy	United States	The fishing vessel sank in the Gulf of Alaska near Kodiak, Territory of Alaska.
Unnamed launch	Imperial Japanese Navy	World War II: The armed launch was sunk by HMIS ML 477 (Royal Indian Navy) off the coast of Burma.
Unnamed launch	Imperial Japanese Navy	World War II: The armed launch was damaged by HMIS ML 477 (Royal Indian Navy) off the coast of Burma and was beached.
Verona	Italy	World War II: The cargo ship was torpedoed and sunk in the Mediterranean Sea north west of Ustica by aircraft based on Malta.
Ville de Tamatave	United Kingdom	The passenger ship foundered in the Atlantic Ocean (50°17′N 40°55′W) with the loss of all 88 people on board.

== 25 January ==
List of shipwrecks: 25 January 1943
Ship	State	Description
City of Flint	United States	World War II: The cargo ship was torpedoed and sunk in the Atlantic Ocean off the Azores (34°47′N 31°18′W) by U-575 (Kriegsmarine) with the loss of six of her 65 crew.. One of the survivors was taken as a prisoner of war.
HMS Corncrake	Royal Navy	The Fish-class trawler/minelayer foundered in the North Atlantic in a storm with the loss of all 23 crew.
HMS LCM 58	Royal Navy	The landing craft mechanized was lost off the coast of Libya.
Lackenby	United Kingdom	World War II: Convoy SC 117: The cargo ship straggled behind the convoy. She was torpedoed and sunk in the Atlantic Ocean south of Cape Farewell, Greenland (55°00′N 37°50′W) by U-624 (Kriegsmarine) with the loss of all 46 crew.
Mouyassar	Syria	World War II: The sailing ship was shelled and sunk in the Mediterranean Sea by U-431 (Kriegsmarine). There were no casualties.
Omar el Kattab	Syria	World War II: The sailing ship was rammed and sunk in the Mediterranean Sea east of Cyprus by U-431 (Kriegsmarine). There were no casualties.
Tōkō Maru No. 2 Go	Imperial Japanese Navy	The Hokkai Maru-class naval trawler/auxiliary storeship ran aground about 12 nautical miles (22 km; 14 mi) west south west of Banjo Zaki, North Paramushiro, Kurile Islands (50°39′N 155°51′E) and was wrecked.

== 26 January ==
List of shipwrecks: 26 January 1943
Ship	State	Description
Asama Maru	Japan	World War II: The cargo ship was torpedoed and sunk in the South China Sea (2°37′N 139°14′E) by USS Wahoo (United States Navy).
Buyo Maru	Imperial Japanese Army	World War II: The Yoshida Maru No. 1-class auxiliary transport ship was torpedoed and sunk in the Pacific Ocean a few miles north of Dutch New Guinea (01°54′N 134°57′E) by USS Wahoo (United States Navy). Wahoo surfaced and sank 20 boats with her 4-inch (100 mm) gun and .50-caliber machine guns. Eighty-six troops, 269 British Indian Army prisoners of war, and a crew member were killed. Between 750 and more than 1,000 survivors were rescued by Chuko Maru No. 2 Go (Imperial Japanese Navy).
Emily	United States	The boat was wrecked at Juneau, Territory of Alaska.
Fukurei Maru No.2	Japan	World War II: The cargo ship was torpedoed and sunk in the Pacific Ocean 270 nautical miles (500 km; 310 mi) north of Dutch New Guinea (02°04′N 140°10′E) by USS Wahoo (United States Navy).
Hassan	Syria	World War II: The sailing ship was rammed and sunk by gunfire in the Mediterranean Sea by U-431 (Kriegsmarine).
Krasnyj Partizan	Soviet Union	World War II: The cargo ship was torpedoed and sunk in the Barents Sea (73°45′N 17°30′E) by U-255 (Kriegsmarine) with the loss of all 51 crew.
Lewis Cass	United States	The Liberty ship was driven ashore and wrecked on Guadalupe Island, Mexico.
Nortind	Norway	World War II: Convoy HX 223: Straggling behind the convoy, the tanker was torpedoed and sunk in the Atlantic Ocean east of Cape Farewell, Greenland (58°30′N 34°00′W) by U-358 (Kriegsmarine) with the loss of all 42 people aboard. Nortind was on a voyage from Curaçao, Curaçao and Dependencies to Gibraltar.
Tokai Maru	Imperial Japanese Navy	World War II: The Kenai Maru-class auxiliary transport ship was torpedoed and sunk in shallow water with her decks are still above water in Apra Harbor, Guam, Mariana Islands (13°27′N 144°37′E) by USS Flying Fish (United States Navy). A crew member was killed. Her wreck was torpedoed again and further damaged on 5 May 1943 by USS Permit (United States Navy). She was refloated in early August 1943.
Ushio Maru	Japan	World War II: The cargo ship was torpedoed and sunk in the Philippine Sea west of Luzon, Philippines, by USS Grayling (United States Navy).
Unnamed	Japan	World War II: The ship was sunk in the Myebon Creek, Burma by HMIS ML 440 and HMIS ML 441 (both Royal Indian Navy).
V 1105 Ernst Gröschel	Kriegsmarine	World War II: The Vorpostenboot struck a mine and sank in the North Sea. Ten of her crew were killed.

== 27 January ==
List of shipwrecks: 27 January 1943
Ship	State	Description
Cape Decision	United States	World War II: The Type C1 ship was torpedoed and sunk in the Atlantic Ocean (22°57′N 47°28′W) by U-105 (Kriegsmarine). All 77 people aboard survived and reached land in their lifeboats.
Julia Ward Howe	United States	World War II: Convoy UGS 4: The Liberty ship straggled behind the convoy. She was torpedoed and sunk in the Atlantic Ocean off the Azores, Portugal (35°29′N 29°10′W) by U-442 (Kriegsmarine) with the loss of four of her 74 crew. Survivors were rescued by NRP Lima (Portuguese Navy).
Montgomery	United States	The lighter sank off "The Keyhole", Key Biscayne, Florida (25°30′N 80°12′W).
MZ 702, and MZ 725	Regia Marina	World War II: The MZ-A landing craft were beached near Pisida, Libya, after an air attack. Engineers blew them on the beach on 29 January during the Axis retreat from the area.
U-769, and U-770	Germany	World War II: The Type VII submarines were severely damaged in an air raid on Wilhelmshaven by Boeing B-17 Flying Fortress aircraft of the United States Eighth Air Force. Construction of both vessels was abandoned.
Unnamed steamships	Japan	World War II: Two small steamships were sunk by HMIS ML 440 and HMIS ML 441 (both Royal Indian Navy) off the coast of Burma.

== 28 January ==
List of shipwrecks: 28 January 1943
Ship	State	Description
Charles C. Pinckney	United States	World War II: Convoy UGS 4: The Liberty ship straggled behind the convoy. She was torpedoed and damaged late in the evening of 27 January. Return fire from the Armed Guard temporarily drove off her attacker U-514 (Kriegsmarine), which returned and sank her in the early hours of 28 January, in the Atlantic Ocean off the Azores, Portugal (36°37′N 30°55′W) with the loss of 56 of her 70 crew. Survivors were rescued by Caritas I (Switzerland).
F 359	Kriegsmarine	World War II: The MFP-A landing craft was sunk in an American bombing raid in the port of Sfax, Tunisia. Two of her crew were wounded ashore.
SF 36 Goldbutt	Kriegsmarine	World War II: The Siebel ferry was sunk in an American bombing raid in the port of Sfax.

== 29 January ==
List of shipwrecks: 29 January 1943
Ship	State	Description
USS Chicago	United States Navy	World War II: Battle of Rennell Island: The Northampton-class cruiser was torpedoed and damaged in the Pacific Ocean between Rennell Island and Guadalcanal, Solomon Islands, just before midnight. She was torpedoed again the next day and sunk (11°25′S 160°56′E) by Imperial Japanese Navy aircraft.
I-1	Imperial Japanese Navy	I-1 World War II: The J1 type submarine was rammed and wrecked in Kamimbo Bay, Guadalcanal by HMNZS Kiwi and HMNZS Moa (both Royal New Zealand Navy).
Kaldnes	Kriegsmarine	World War II: The cargo ship was torpedoed and sunk 10 nautical miles (19 km) south west of Stavanger, Norway by Handley Page Hampden aircraft of 489 Squadron, Royal New Zealand Air Force with the loss of fourteen lives.
M 4606	Kriegsmarine	World War II: The auxiliary minesweeper was bombed and sunk at St Peter Port, Guernsey, Channel Islands by Allied aircraft.
Mosstrand	Germany	World War II: The cargo ship was bombed and sunk 10 nautical miles (19 km) south west of Stavanger by British aircraft.
Nichiun Maru	Imperial Japanese Army	World War II: The Chowa Maru-class auxiliary transport was torpedoed and sunk in the Pacific Ocean off New Georgia, Solomon Islands (06°22′S 156°04′E) by USS Gato (United States Navy).
HMS Pozarica	Royal Navy	World War II: The flakship was torpedoed north of Beni Ksila, Algeria (37°04′N 4°36′E) by Savoia-Marchetti SM.79 aircraft of the Regia Aeronautica and Heinkel He 111 aircraft of III Staffeln, Kampfgeschwader 26, Luftwaffe. She capsized at Bougie, Algeria on 13 February 1943. HMS Pozarica was refloated on 5 March 1951. The wreck was scrapped in Savona, Italy, from 14 June 1951.
RD 4	Regia Marina	World War II: The RD-class minesweeper was bombed and sunk in "The Narrows" by Allied aircraft.
Samuel Gompers	United States	World War II: The Liberty ship was torpedoed and sunk in the Pacific Ocean off New Caledonia (24°21′S 166°21′W) by I-10 (Imperial Japanese Navy). A gunner and three of her crew were killed. Survivors were rescued by French fishing boats and P-111 (United States Army).
Ufa	Soviet Union	World War II: The cargo ship was torpedoed and sunk in the Barents Sea by U-255 (Kriegsmarine) with the loss of all 39 crew.
Umaria	United Kingdom	World War II, Convoy SL 129: The cargo ship was torpedoed by U-662 (Kriegsmarine) west of Ouessant, Finistère, France. Umaria was on a voyage from Ceylon to London. She was scuttled the next day by HMS Wear (Royal Navy) at 46°44′N 16°38′W. Survivors were rescued by HMS Wear.
V 2018 Vogtland	Kriegsmarine	World War II: The Vorpostenboot struck a mine in the North Sea and was severely damaged.
Vercelli	Italy	World War II: The cargo ship was bombed and damaged in the Mediterranean Sea 30 nautical miles (56 km) off Cape Bon, Tunisia by Allied aircraft. She sank under tow the next day 1 1/2 nautical miles (2.8 km) off Cape Farina, Tunisia.

== 30 January ==
List of shipwrecks: 30 January 1943
Ship	State	Description
Aniello	Italy	World War II: The sailing vessel was sunk in the Mediterranean Sea by HMS Safari (Royal Navy).
Gemma	Italy	World War II: The sailing vessel was sunk in the Mediterranean Sea by HMS Safari (Royal Navy).
Noto	Italy	World War II: The cargo ship was bombed and sunk at Bizerte, Tunisia by Boeing B-17 Flying Fortress aircraft of the United States Twelfth Air Force.
Parma	Italy	World War II: The cargo ship was torpedoed and sunk in the Mediterranean Sea by aircraft based on Malta.
HMS Samphire	Royal Navy	World War II: The Flower-class corvette was torpedoed and sunk in the Mediterranean Sea off Bougie, Algeria by Platino (Regia Marina) with the loss of 45 of her 85 crew.
Toa Maru No. 2 Go	Imperial Japanese Navy	World War II: The Seia Maru-class auxiliary transport was bombed and sunk in the Solomon Sea about 5 N.M.s south of Vella Lavella Island, north of Gizo Island, British Solomon Islands (07°43′S 156°51′E) by Douglas SBD Dauntless dive bombers of Squadron VSMB-233, United States Marine Corps. Two troops and a crew member were killed.
Unie	Regia Marina	World War II: The Galeb-class minelayer was bombed and sunk at Bizerte by Boeing B-17 Flying Fortress aircraft of the United States Twelfth Air Force.
V 1102 Gleiwitz	Kriegsmarine	World War II: The Vorpostenboot was driven ashore and wrecked on Hanstholm, Denmark.
V 1109 Mähren	Kriegsmarine	World War II: The Vorpostenboot was driven ashore on Hanstholm. She was later salvaged.
USS YFD-220	United States Navy	The floating dry dock sank in heavy weather off the coast of California.

== 31 January ==
List of shipwrecks: 31 January 1943
Ship	State	Description
Calypso	Regia Marina	World War II: The Circé-class submarine was bombed and sunk at Bizerte, Tunisia by Boeing B-17 Flying Fortress aircraft of the United States Twelfth Air Force.
Generale Marcello Prestinari	Regia Marina	World War II: The Generali-class torpedo boat was sunk by a mine south-east of Cani Island, Tunisia with the loss of 54 of her crew.
Lisboa	Kriegsmarine	World War II: The transport ship was torpedoed and sunk in the Mediterranean Sea 5 nautical miles (9.3 km) north of Sousse, Tunisia by HMS Unruffled (Royal Navy).
Nautilus	French Navy	World War II: The submarine was bombed and sunk at Bizerte by Boeing B-17 Flying Fortress aircraft of the United States Twelfth Air Force.
Prawn	United States	The fishing vessel was destroyed by fire at Wrangell, Territory of Alaska.
Procellaria	Regia Marina	World War II: The Gabbiano-class corvette was sunk by a mine west of Sicily.
Spoletto	Italy	World War II: The cargo ship was bombed, exploded and sunk at Bizerte by Boeing B-17 Flying Fortress aircraft of the United States Twelfth Air Force.

== Unknown date ==
List of shipwrecks: Unknown date 1943
Ship	State	Description
Himori Maru	Japan	The cargo ship stranded on the southern tip of Mikomotojima on or before 6 January. She was still stranded on 7 January. No further information.
Kalinin	Soviet Union	The cargo ship was sunk at Tuapse in mid-January with the loss of all crew.
HMS LCP(L) 203, HMS LCP(L) 204, HMS LCP(L) 205, and HMS LCP(L) 206	Royal Navy	The landing craft personnel (large) were lost sometime in January.
Outarde	Canada	The cargo ship (2,241 GRT, 1924) ran aground near the mouth of the St Lawrence estuary near St Pierre and Miquelon. She later was refloated, repaired, and returned to service.
Reichenfels	Germany	World War II: The cargo ship was bombed and sunk at Tripoli, Libya by Consolidated B-24 Liberator aircraft of the United States Ninth Air Force between 15 and 21 January.
Teodolinda	Italy	World War II: The tanker was torpedoed and sunk in the Mediterranean Sea by HMS Unruffled (Royal Navy) between 23 and 31 January.
U-337	Kriegsmarine	World War II: The Type VIIC submarine was lost on patrol in the Atlantic Ocean on or after 3 January with the loss of all 47 crew.
U-519	Kriegsmarine	World War II: The Type IXC submarine was declared missing as of 31 January.
U-553	Kriegsmarine	World War II: The Type VIIC submarine was lost on patrol in the Atlantic Ocean on or after 20 January with the loss of all 47 crew.
Two unnamed vessels	Japan	World War II: The fishing vessels were sunk by HMIS ML 439 (Royal Indian Navy) at Kyaukpyu, Burma.
