= German submarine U-268 =

German World War II submarine

History

Nazi Germany
- Name: U-268
- Ordered: 20 January 1941
- Builder: Bremer Vulkan, Bremen-Vegesack
- Yard number: 33
- Laid down: 4 September 1941
- Launched: 9 June 1942
- Commissioned: 29 July 1942
- Fate: Sunk, 19 February 1943

General characteristics
- Class & type: Type VIIC submarine
- Displacement: 769 tonnes (757 long tons) surfaced; 871 t (857 long tons) submerged
- Length: 67.10 m (220 ft 2 in) o/a; 50.50 m (165 ft 8 in) pressure hull
- Beam: 6.20 m (20 ft 4 in) o/a; 4.70 m (15 ft 5 in) pressure hull
- Height: 9.60 m (31 ft 6 in)
- Draught: 4.74 m (15 ft 7 in)
- Installed power: 2,800–3,200 PS (2,100–2,400 kW; 2,800–3,200 bhp) (diesels); 750 PS (550 kW; 740 shp) (electric)
- Propulsion: 2 shafts; 2 × diesel engines; 2 × electric motors
- Speed: 17.7 knots (32.8 km/h; 20.4 mph) surfaced; 7.6 knots (14.1 km/h; 8.7 mph) submerged
- Range: 8,500 nmi (15,700 km; 9,800 mi) at 10 knots (19 km/h; 12 mph) surfaced; 80 nmi (150 km; 92 mi) at 4 knots (7.4 km/h; 4.6 mph) submerged
- Test depth: 230 m (750 ft); Crush depth: 250–295 m (820–968 ft)
- Complement: 4 officers, 40–56 enlisted
- Armament: 5 × 53.3 cm (21 in) torpedo tubes (four bow, one stern); 14 × torpedoes or 26 × TMA or 39 × TMB tube-launched mines; 1 × 8.8 cm (3.46 in) deck gun (220 rounds); 2 × 20 mm AA (4,380 rounds)

Service record
- Part of: 8th U-boat Flotilla; 29 July 1942 – 31 January 1943; 1st U-boat Flotilla; 1 – 19 February 1943
- Identification codes: M 14 594
- Commanders: Oblt.z.S. Ernst Heydemann; 29 July 1942 – 19 February 1943
- Operations: 1 patrol: 10 January – 19 February 1943
- Victories: 1 merchant ship sunk (14,547 GRT); 3 warships sunk (873 tons)

German submarine U-268 was a Type VIIC U-boat built for Nazi Germany's Kriegsmarine for service during World War II.

Commissioned on 29 July 1942, she served with the 8th U-boat Flotilla for training and later served with the 1st U-boat Flotilla from 1 to 19 February 1943.

== Design ==
German Type VIIC submarines were preceded by the shorter Type VIIB submarines. U-268 had a displacement of 769 tonnes (757 long tons) when at the surface and 871 tonnes (857 long tons) while submerged. She had a total length of 67.10 m (220 ft 2 in), a pressure hull length of 50.50 m (165 ft 8 in), a beam of 6.20 m (20 ft 4 in), a height of 9.60 m (31 ft 6 in), and a draught of 4.74 m (15 ft 7 in). The submarine was powered by two Germaniawerft F46 four-stroke, six-cylinder supercharged diesel engines producing a total of 2,800 to 3,200 metric horsepower (2,060 to 2,350 kW; 2,760 to 3,160 shp) for use while surfaced, two AEG GU 460/8–27 double-acting electric motors producing a total of 750 metric horsepower (550 kW; 740 shp) for use while submerged. She had two shafts and two 1.23 m (4 ft) propellers. The boat was capable of operating at depths of up to 230 metres (750 ft).

The submarine had a maximum surface speed of 17.7 knots (32.8 km/h; 20.4 mph) and a maximum submerged speed of 7.6 knots (14.1 km/h; 8.7 mph). When submerged, the boat could operate for 80 nautical miles (150 km; 92 mi) at 4 knots (7.4 km/h; 4.6 mph); when surfaced, she could travel 8,500 nautical miles (15,700 km; 9,800 mi) at 10 knots (19 km/h; 12 mph). U-268 was fitted with five 53.3 cm (21 in) torpedo tubes (four fitted at the bow and one at the stern), fourteen torpedoes, one 8.8 cm (3.46 in) SK C/35 naval gun, 220 rounds, and one twin 2 cm (0.79 in) C/30 anti-aircraft guns. The boat had a complement of between forty-four and sixty.

== Service history ==
U-268 departed Bergen on 10 January 1943 on her first and only patrol. On 17 January she sank the 14,547 GRT Norwegian whale factory ship Vestfold, which was laden with 17,386 tons of fuel oil, and three British landing craft - HMS LCT-2239, LCT-2267 and LCT-2344 (each 291 tons) - as deck cargo. Before sinking, Vestfold, which had been abandoned with her engines still running, steamed in circles, almost colliding with another ship.

== Fate ==
On 19 February 1943 while returning to her new base in occupied France, U-268 was sunk in the Bay of Biscay, west of Saint Nazaire, at position 47°03′N 05°56′W by depth charges dropped from a Vickers Wellington bomber of No.172 Squadron RAF. All 44 hands were lost.

=== Wolfpacks ===
U-268 took part in five wolfpacks, namely:

- Habicht (10 – 15 January 1943)
- Falke (15 – 19 January 1943)
- Haudegen (19 January – 2 February 1943)
- Nordsturm (2 – 9 February 1943)
- Haudegen (9 – 10 February 1943)

== Summary of raiding history ==
Date	Ship Name	Nationality	Tonnage (Note: Merchant ship tonnages are in gross register tons. Military vessels are listed by tons displacement.)	Fate
17 January 1943	Vestfold	Panama	14,547	Sunk
17 January 1943	HMS LCT-2239 (Note: Carried by Vestfold.)	Royal Navy	291	Sunk
17 January 1943	HMS LCT-2267	Royal Navy	291	Sunk
17 January 1943	HMS LCT-2344	Royal Navy	291	Sunk

== Bibliography ==
- Busch, Rainer; Röll, Hans-Joachim (1999). German U-boat commanders of World War II : a biographical dictionary. Translated by Brooks, Geoffrey. London, Annapolis, Md: Greenhill Books, Naval Institute Press. ISBN 1-55750-186-6.
- Busch, Rainer; Röll, Hans-Joachim (1999). Der U-Boot-Krieg, 1939-1945: Deutsche U-Boot-Verluste von September 1939 bis Mai 1945 [German U-boat losses from September 1939 to May 1945] (in German). Vol. IV. Hamburg, Berlin, Bonn: Mittler. ISBN 3-8132-0514-2.
- Gröner, Eric; Jung, Dieter; Maass, Martin (1991). German Warships 1815-1945: U-boats and Mine Warfare Vessels. Vol. 2. Translated by Thomas, Keith; Magowan, Rachel. London: Conway Maritime Press. ISBN 0-85177-593-4.
- Bishop, Chris (2006). Kriegsmarine U-Boats, 1939-45. London: Amber Books. ISBN 978-1-904687-96-2.
