= Wilhelm Dommes =

German U-boat commander

- Born: 16 April 1907; Berent District, West Prussia, German Empire
- Died: 23 January 1990 (aged 82); Hannover, Lower Saxony, West Germany
- Military career
- Allegiance: Nazi Germany
- Branch: Kriegsmarine
- Service years: 1933–45
- Rank: Fregattenkapitän
- Commands: U-431; U-178; Southeast Asia U-boat region
- Awards: Knight's Cross of the Iron Cross

Wilhelm Dommes (16 April 1907 in Berent District, West Prussia – 23 January 1990 in Hannover) was a German U-boat commander in World War II and recipient of the Knight's Cross of the Iron Cross of Nazi Germany. He was the commander of U-boats in the Indian Ocean, whereby German and Japanese forces fought together in the only time in the war. Dommes was the first commander of the U-boat base, in the former British seaplane base in Penang, where he served as head of the Southeast Asia U-boat region.

== Awards ==
- Wehrmacht Long Service Award 3rd Class (23 January 1937)
- The Return of Sudetenland Commemorative Medal of 1 October 1938 (6 September 1940)
- Iron Cross (1939)
  - 2nd Class (29 November 1939)
  - 1st Class (10 February 1942)
- U-boat War Badge (1939) (10 February 1942)
- Medaglia di bronzo al Valore Militare (27 July 1942)
- Medaglia d'Argento al Valor Militare (29 May 1943)
- Knight's Cross of the Iron Cross on 2 December 1942 as Kapitänleutnant and commander of U-431
- War Merit Cross with Swords
  - 2nd Class (30 January 1945)
  - 1st Class (20 April 1945)
- U-boat Front Clasp (5 March 1945)
