= Führer der Unterseeboote =

Commanding officer of U-boat forces

The post of Führer der Unterseeboote (FdU) ("Leader of the U-boats") was the senior commanding officer of U-boat forces in a theatre of war. The submarine service in the Kaiserliche Marine of World War I and the Kriegsmarine of World War II, used the title for several senior commands during those conflicts. It was senior to Flotilla chief (Chef) and was introduced as U-boat forces in an area expanded beyond flotilla size. In 1917 the posts of FdU were themselves subordinated to an overall "Commander of the U-boats" (Befehlshaber der Unterseeboote, or BdU). The post of FdU was revived in the 1930s with German re-armament and was held from January 1936 and until 17 October 1939 by Karl Dönitz. On that date he was named BdU, and two subordinate FdU posts were established, FdU West ("FdU West") and FdU Ost ("FdU East"). In the further course of the war, several further posts were created for the commanders of U-boat regions

== World War I ==
Area	Commando	Rank	Name	Timeframe
North Sea	Uboote der Hochseestreitkräfte	Korvettenkapitän/Fregattenkapitän/Kommodore	Hermann Bauer	21 August 1914 – 4 June 1917
Baltic Sea	OdO	Kapitänleutnant	Hans Adam	August 1914 – March 1915
		Kapitänleutnant	Alfred Schött	July 1915 – 10 December 1917
Channel Coast	U-Flotilla Flanders	Kapitänleutnant/Korvettenkapitän	Karl Bartenbach	29 March 1915 – 30 September 1917
	FdU Flandern	Korvettenkapitän	Karl Bartenbach	1 October – 10 December 1917
Mediterranean Sea	U-Halbflottille Pola	Kapitänleutnant	Hans Adam	1 July – 17 November 1915
	Pola Flotilla	Korvettenkapitän	Waldemar Kophamel	18 November 1915 – 8 June 1917
	FdU Mittelmeer (Pola/Cattaro)	Kapitän zur See/Kommodore	Theodor Püllen	9 June – 29 December 1917
		Kapitän zur See/Kommodore	Kurt Graßhoff	29 December 1917 – Oktober 1918
		Kommodore	Theodor Püllen	October 1918

== World War II ==
In the further course of the war, several further posts were created for the commanders of U-boat regions.

- F.d.U. Ausb. - Führer der U-Ausbildungsflottillen: Head of the training flotillas: Viktor Schütze, 7 February 1942 – May 1945
- F.d.U. Italien - Führer der U-Boote Italien: Head of the U-boats for Italy: Hans-Rudolf Rösing, from July 1942
- F.d.U. Mitte - Führer der U-Boote Mitte: Head of the U-boats for the central sector
- F.d.U. Mittelmeer - Führer der U-Boote Mittelmeer: Head of the U-boats for the Mediterranean: Werner Hartmann, January – August 1944
- F.d.U. Nordmeer - Führer der U-Boote Nordmeer: Head of the U-boats for the North Sea: Reinhard Suhren: January 1943 – May 1944
- F.d.U. Norwegen - Führer der U-Boote Norwegen: Head of the U-boats for Norway
- F.d.U. Ost - Führer der U-Boote Ostsee: Head of the U-boats for the Baltic Sea
- F.d.U. West - Führer der U-Boote im Westraum: Head of the U-boats for the West (France)
