= German submarine U-431 =

German World War II submarine

History

Nazi Germany
- Name: U-431
- Ordered: 23 September 1939
- Builder: Schichau-Werke, Danzig
- Yard number: 1472
- Laid down: 4 January 1940
- Launched: 2 February 1941
- Commissioned: 5 April 1941
- Fate: Sunk on 21 October 1943 near Algiers at position 37°23′N 00°35′E by depth charges from an RAF Wellington bomber of 179 Squadron. All hands were lost.

General characteristics
- Class & type: Type VIIC submarine
- Displacement: 769 tonnes (757 long tons) surfaced; 871 t (857 long tons) submerged
- Length: 67.10 m (220 ft 2 in) o/a; 50.50 m (165 ft 8 in) pressure hull
- Beam: 6.20 m (20 ft 4 in) o/a; 4.70 m (15 ft 5 in) pressure hull
- Height: 9.60 m (31 ft 6 in)
- Draught: 4.74 m (15 ft 7 in)
- Installed power: 2,800–3,200 PS (2,100–2,400 kW; 2,800–3,200 bhp) (diesels); 750 PS (550 kW; 740 shp) (electric)
- Propulsion: 2 shafts; 2 × diesel engines; 2 × electric motors
- Speed: 17.7 knots (32.8 km/h; 20.4 mph) surfaced; 7.6 knots (14.1 km/h; 8.7 mph) submerged
- Range: 8,500 nmi (15,700 km; 9,800 mi) at 10 knots (19 km/h; 12 mph) surfaced; 80 nmi (150 km; 92 mi) at 4 knots (7.4 km/h; 4.6 mph) submerged
- Test depth: 230 m (750 ft); Crush depth: 250–295 m (820–968 ft)
- Complement: 4 officers, 40–56 enlisted
- Armament: 4 × 53.3 cm (21 in) torpedo tubes in the bow; 14 × torpedoes or 26 TMA mines; 1 × 8.8 cm (3.46 in) deck gun (220 rounds); 1 x 2 cm (0.79 in) C/30 AA gun

Service record
- Part of: 3rd U-boat Flotilla; 5 April – 31 December 1941; 29th U-boat Flotilla; 1 January 1942 – 21 October 1943
- Identification codes: M 40 228
- Commanders: Kptlt. Wilhelm Dommes; 5 April 1941 – 6 January 1943; Oblt.z.S. Dietrich Schöneboom; 15 December 1942 – 21 October 1943
- Operations: 16 patrols: 1st patrol: 10 July – 11 August 1941; 2nd patrol: 13 September – 12 October 1941; 3rd patrol: a. 16 November – 20 December 1941; b. 18 – 22 January 1942; 4th patrol: 25 January – 10 February 1942; 5th patrol: 18 March – 15 April 1942; 6th patrol: 14 – 30 May 1942; 7th patrol: 4 – 20 June 1942; 8th patrol: 2 – 27 September 1942; 9th patrol: 29 September – 4 November 1942; 10th patrol: 7 – 22 November 1942; 11th patrol: 7 January – 8 February 1943; 12th patrol: 11 – 29 March 1943; 13th patrol: 20 – 29 May 1943; 14th patrol: 5 – 27 June 1943; 15th patrol: 9 August – 1 September 1943; 16th patrol: 26 September – 21 October 1943
- Victories: 6 merchant ships sunk (7,679 GRT); 2 warships sunk (3,548 tons); 1 auxiliary warship sunk (313 GRT); 1 merchant ship damaged (3,560 GRT); 1 warship damaged (450 tons)

German submarine U-431 was a Type VIIC U-boat built for Nazi Germany's Kriegsmarine for service during World War II. She was laid down on 4 January 1940 by Schichau-Werke in Danzig as yard number 1472, launched on 2 February 1941 and commissioned on 5 April 1941 under Kapitänleutnant Wilhelm Dommes (Knight's Cross).

== Design ==
German Type VIIC submarines were preceded by the shorter Type VIIB submarines. U-431 had a displacement of 769 tonnes (757 long tons) when at the surface and 871 tonnes (857 long tons) while submerged. She had a total length of 67.10 m (220 ft 2 in), a pressure hull length of 50.50 m (165 ft 8 in), a beam of 6.20 m (20 ft 4 in), a height of 9.60 m (31 ft 6 in), and a draught of 4.74 m (15 ft 7 in). The submarine was powered by two Germaniawerft F46 four-stroke, six-cylinder supercharged diesel engines producing a total of 2,800 to 3,200 metric horsepower (2,060 to 2,350 kW; 2,760 to 3,160 shp) for use while surfaced, two AEG GU 460/8-276 double-acting electric motors producing a total of 750 metric horsepower (550 kW; 740 shp) for use while submerged. She had two shafts and two 1.23 m (4 ft) propellers. The boat was capable of operating at depths of up to 230 metres (750 ft).

The submarine had a maximum surface speed of 17.7 knots (32.8 km/h; 20.4 mph) and a maximum submerged speed of 7.6 knots (14.1 km/h; 8.7 mph). When submerged, the boat could operate for 80 nautical miles (150 km; 92 mi) at 4 knots (7.4 km/h; 4.6 mph); when surfaced, she could travel 8,500 nautical miles (15,700 km; 9,800 mi) at 10 knots (19 km/h; 12 mph). U-431 was fitted with four 53.3 cm (21 in) torpedo tubes in the bow, fourteen torpedoes, one 8.8 cm (3.46 in) SK C/35 naval gun, 220 rounds, and a 2 cm (0.79 in) C/30 anti-aircraft gun. The boat had a complement of between forty-four and sixty.

== Service history ==
The boat's service began on 5 April 1941 for training as part of the 3rd U-boat Flotilla. Afterwards she transferred to the 29th flotilla operating in the Mediterranean on 1 January 1942. In 16 patrols she sank or damaged 11 ships in total.

=== Wolfpacks ===
She took part in one wolfpack, namely:

- Brandenburg (15 September – 1 October 1941)

=== Fate ===
She was sunk on 21 October 1943 in the Mediterranean off Algiers at position 37°23′N 00°35′E by depth charges dropped from an RAF Wellington bomber of 179 Squadron, operating out of Gibraltar. All hands were lost.

== Summary of raiding history ==
Date	Ship Name	Nationality	Tonnage (Note: Merchant ship tonnages are in gross register tons. Military vessels are listed by tons displacement.)	Fate
2 October 1941	Hatasu	United Kingdom	3,198	Sunk
13 December 1941	Myriel	United Kingdom	3,560	Damaged
29 January 1942	HMS Sotra	Royal Navy	313	Sunk
20 May 1942	Eocene	United Kingdom	4,216	Sunk
15 June 1942	HMS LCT-119	Royal Navy	450	Damaged
10 November 1942	HMS Martin	Royal Navy	1,920	Sunk
13 November 1942	HNLMS Isaac Sweers	Royal Netherlands Navy	1,628	Sunk
23 January 1943	Alexandria	Egypt	100	Sunk
25 January 1943	Mouyassar	Syria	47	Sunk
25 January 1943	Omar el Kattab	Syria	38	Sunk
26 January 1943	Hassan	Syria	80	Sunk

== See also ==
- Mediterranean U-boat Campaign (World War II)
- List of Knight's Cross of the Iron Cross recipients

== Bibliography ==
- Busch, Rainer; Röll, Hans-Joachim (1999). German U-boat commanders of World War II : a biographical dictionary. Translated by Brooks, Geoffrey. London, Annapolis, Md: Greenhill Books, Naval Institute Press. ISBN 1-55750-186-6.
- Busch, Rainer; Röll, Hans-Joachim (1999). Deutsche U-Boot-Verluste von September 1939 bis Mai 1945 [German U-boat losses from September 1939 to May 1945]. Der U-Boot-Krieg (in German). Vol. IV. Hamburg, Berlin, Bonn: Mittler. ISBN 3-8132-0514-2.
- Gröner, Erich; Jung, Dieter; Maass, Martin (1991). U-boats and Mine Warfare Vessels. German Warships 1815–1945. Vol. 2. Translated by Thomas, Keith; Magowan, Rachel. London: Conway Maritime Press. ISBN 0-85177-593-4.
