= German submarine U-182 =

German World War II submarine

Coordinates: 33°55′N 20°35′W

History

Nazi Germany
- Name: U-182
- Ordered: 15 August 1940
- Builder: DeSchiMAG AG Weser, Bremen
- Yard number: 1022
- Laid down: 7 April 1941
- Launched: 3 March 1942
- Commissioned: 30 June 1942
- Fate: Sunk on 16 May 1943

General characteristics
- Class & type: Type IXD2 submarine
- Displacement: 1,610 tonnes (1,580 long tons) surfaced; 1,799 tonnes (1,771 long tons) submerged
- Length: 87.58 m (287 ft 4 in) (o/a); 68.50 m (224 ft 9 in) (pressure hull)
- Beam: 7.50 m (24 ft 7 in) (o/a); 4.40 m (14 ft 5 in) (pressure hull)
- Height: 10.20 m (33 ft 6 in)
- Draught: 5.35 m (17 ft 7 in)
- Installed power: 9,000 PS (6,620 kW; 8,880 bhp) (diesels); 1,000 PS (740 kW; 990 shp) (electric)
- Propulsion: 2 shafts; 2 × diesel engines; 2 × electric motors; 2 × 1.85 m (6 ft 1 in) propellers
- Speed: 20.8 knots (38.5 km/h; 23.9 mph) surfaced; 6.9 knots (12.8 km/h; 7.9 mph) submerged
- Range: 12,750 nautical miles (23,610 km; 14,670 mi) at 10 knots (19 km/h; 12 mph) surfaced; submerged 115 nmi (213 km; 132 mi) at 4 knots (7.4 km/h; 4.6 mph)
- Test depth: Calculated crush depth: 230 m (750 ft)
- Boats & landing craft carried: 2 dinghies
- Complement: 4-7 officer, 51-57 enlisted
- Armament: 6 × torpedo tubes (four bow, two stern); 24 × 53.3 cm (21 in) torpedoes; 1 × 10.5 cm (4.1 in) SK C/32 deck gun (150 rounds); 1 × 3.7 cm (1.5 in) SK C/30; 1 × 2 cm (0.79 in) C/30 anti-aircraft gun

Service record
- Part of: 4th U-boat Flotilla; 30 June - 30 November 1942; 12th U-boat Flotilla; 1 December 1942 - 16 May 1943
- Identification codes: M 05 593
- Commanders: Kptlt. Asmus Nicolai Clausen; 30 June 1942 - 16 May 1943
- Operations: 1 patrol: 9 December 1942 - 16 May 1943
- Victories: 5 merchant ships sunk (30,071 GRT)

German submarine U-182 was a Type IX D 2 U-boat of Nazi Germany's Kriegsmarine which served in World War II. Her keel was laid down on 7 April 1941 at DeSchiMAG AG Weser, Bremen as yard number 1022; she was launched on 3 March 1942 and commissioned on 30 June of the same year.

She carried out a single war patrol, sinking five merchant vessels and spending 159 days at sea.

U-182 was probably sunk near Madeira on 16 May 1943 by USS MacKenzie. 61 crew members and three prisoners of war died. The boat had been unsuccessfully attacked by a USAAF B-24 Liberator the previous day.

== Design ==
German Type IXD2 submarines were considerably larger than the original Type IXs. U-182 had a displacement of 1,610 tonnes (1,580 long tons) when at the surface and 1,799 tonnes (1,771 long tons) while submerged. The U-boat had a total length of 87.58 m (287 ft 4 in), a pressure hull length of 68.50 m (224 ft 9 in), a beam of 7.50 m (24 ft 7 in), a height of 10.20 m (33 ft 6 in), and a draught of 5.35 m (17 ft 7 in). The submarine was powered by two MAN M 9 V 40/46 supercharged four-stroke, nine-cylinder diesel engines plus two MWM RS34.5S six-cylinder four-stroke diesel engines for cruising, producing a total of 9,000 metric horsepower (6,620 kW; 8,880 shp) for use while surfaced, two Siemens-Schuckert 2 GU 345/34 double-acting electric motors producing a total of 1,000 shaft horsepower (1,010 PS; 750 kW) for use while submerged. She had two shafts and two 1.85 m (6 ft) propellers. The boat was capable of operating at depths of up to 200 metres (660 ft).

The submarine had a maximum surface speed of 20.8 knots (38.5 km/h; 23.9 mph) and a maximum submerged speed of 6.9 knots (12.8 km/h; 7.9 mph). When submerged, the boat could operate for 121 nautical miles (224 km; 139 mi) at 2 knots (3.7 km/h; 2.3 mph); when surfaced, she could travel 12,750 nautical miles (23,610 km; 14,670 mi) at 10 knots (19 km/h; 12 mph). U-182 was fitted with six 53.3 cm (21 in) torpedo tubes (four fitted at the bow and two at the stern), 24 torpedoes, one 10.5 cm (4.13 in) SK C/32 naval gun, 150 rounds, and a 3.7 cm (1.5 in) SK C/30 with 2575 rounds as well as one 2 cm (0.79 in) C/30 anti-aircraft gun with 8100 rounds. The boat had a complement of fifty-five.

== Summary of raiding history ==
Date	Ship	Nationality	Tonnage (GRT)	Fate
15 January 1943	Ocean Courage	United Kingdom	7,173	Sunk
17 February 1943	Llanashe	United Kingdom	4,836	Sunk
10 March 1943	Richard D. Spaight	United States	7,177	Sunk
5 April 1943	Aloe	United Kingdom	5,047	Sunk
1 May 1943	Adelfotis	Greece	5,838	Sunk

== Bibliography ==
- Busch, Rainer; Röll, Hans-Joachim (1999). German U-boat commanders of World War II : a biographical dictionary. Translated by Brooks, Geoffrey. London, Annapolis, Md: Greenhill Books, Naval Institute Press. ISBN 1-55750-186-6.
- Busch, Rainer; Röll, Hans-Joachim (1999). Deutsche U-Boot-Verluste von September 1939 bis Mai 1945 [German U-boat losses from September 1939 to May 1945]. Der U-Boot-Krieg (in German). Vol. IV. Hamburg, Berlin, Bonn: Mittler. ISBN 3-8132-0514-2.
- Gröner, Erich; Jung, Dieter; Maass, Martin (1991). U-boats and Mine Warfare Vessels. German Warships 1815–1945. Vol. 2. Translated by Thomas, Keith; Magowan, Rachel. London: Conway Maritime Press. ISBN 0-85177-593-4.
