= Befehlshaber der U-Boote =

Supreme commander of the German Navy's U-boat Arm during both world wars

Commander of the U-boats
- Befehlshaber der U-Boote
- Kriegsmarine
- Abbreviation: BdU
- Reports to: Oberbefehlshaber der Marine
- Precursor: Führer der Unterseeboote
- Formation: 1917, recreated 17 October 1939
- Abolished: 8 May 1945

The Befehlshaber der Unterseeboote or BdU (Eng: "Commander of the U-boats") was the supreme commander of the German Navy's U-boat Arm (Ubootwaffe) during the First and Second World Wars. The term also referred to the Command HQ of the U-boat arm.

The title was established in June 1917, replacing the role of "Leader of the U-boats" (Führer der Unterseeboote, or FdU) for the High Seas Flotillas. The first incumbent was Kapitan zur See/Kommodore Andreas Michelsen, previously head of the High Seas Fleet’s destroyer force. The post was abolished with the end of the war.

It was revived on 17 October 1939, when Karl Dönitz was promoted to rear admiral (Konteradmiral). His previous title had been FdU, a position he had held from January 1936.

On 31 January 1943 Dönitz was promoted to grand admiral (Großadmiral) and became supreme commander (Oberbefehlshaber der Kriegsmarine) of the entire Kriegsmarine, replacing Erich Raeder. He retained the title, but was replaced as operational commander at BdU by his chief of staff Eberhard Godt.

Godt's successor was Admiral Hans Georg von Friedeburg, who held the position at the end of the war and became commander-in-chief of the German navy when Dönitz became head of Nazi Germany after Hitler's suicide.

== Imperial German Navy (Kaiserliche Marine) ==
- Andreas Michelsen (June 1917 to November 1918)

== Kriegsmarine ==
=== Commander ===
No.	Portrait	Name	Took office	Left office	Time in office	Other positions held
1	Karl Dönitz	Konteradmiral; Karl Dönitz (1891–1980)	17 October 1939	31 January 1943	3 years, 106 days	FdU (January 1936 - September 1939)
2	Eberhard Godt	Konteradmiral; Eberhard Godt (1900–1995)	31 January 1943	8 May 1945	2 years, 97 days	Admiralstabsoffizier (1939-1939); Chef der Operationsabteilung (1939-1945)

=== Subordinate ===
Department Chief

No.	Portrait	Abteilungschef	Took office	Left office	Time in office
1	Hans-Georg von Friedeburg	Kapitän zur See; Hans-Georg von Friedeburg (1895–1945 (Note: committed suicide 23 May 1945))	17 October 1939	11 September 1941	1 year, 10 months

2nd Admiral of the U-boats

No.	Portrait	2. Admiral der Unterseeboote	Took office	Left office	Time in office
1	Hans-Georg von Friedeburg	Konteradmiral; Hans-Georg von Friedeburg (1895–1945)	12 September 1941	30 April 1943	1 year, 7 months

Commanding Admiral of the U-boats

No.	Portrait	Kommandierender Admiral der Unterseeboote	Took office	Left office	Time in office
1	Hans-Georg von Friedeburg	Admiral; Hans-Georg von Friedeburg (1895–1945)	1 February 1943	30 April 1945	2 years, 2 months
2	Kurt Dobratz	Kapitän zur See; Kurt Dobratz (1904–1995)	1 May 1945	8 May 1945	7 days

Dobratz had transferred from navy to Luftwaffe in 1935. He rejoined the Kriegsmarine in 1943 and was given command of U-1232 taking it out on one patrol before becoming chief of staff at BdU.

Chief of Staff of the Commanding Admiral of the U-boats

No.	Portrait	Stabschef des Kommandierenden Admirals der Unterseeboote	Took office	Left office	Time in office
1	Heinz-Ehler Beucke	Fregattenkapitän; Heinz-Ehler Beucke (1904–1979)	March 1943	May 1943	2 months
2	Ernst Kratzenberg	Konteradmiral; Ernst Kratzenberg (1896–1984)	June 1943	April 1945	1 year, 10 months
3	Kurt Dobratz	Kapitän zur See; Kurt Dobratz (1904–1995)	April 1945	April 1945	0 days
4	Ewald Engler	Fregattenkapitän; Ewald Engler (born 1913)	1 May 1945	8 May 1945	7 days

Beucke was withdrawn from command of U-boat (a single patrol with German submarine U-173) in 1942 because his brothers had been killed.
