= HMS Unseen (P51) =

Submarine of the Royal Navy

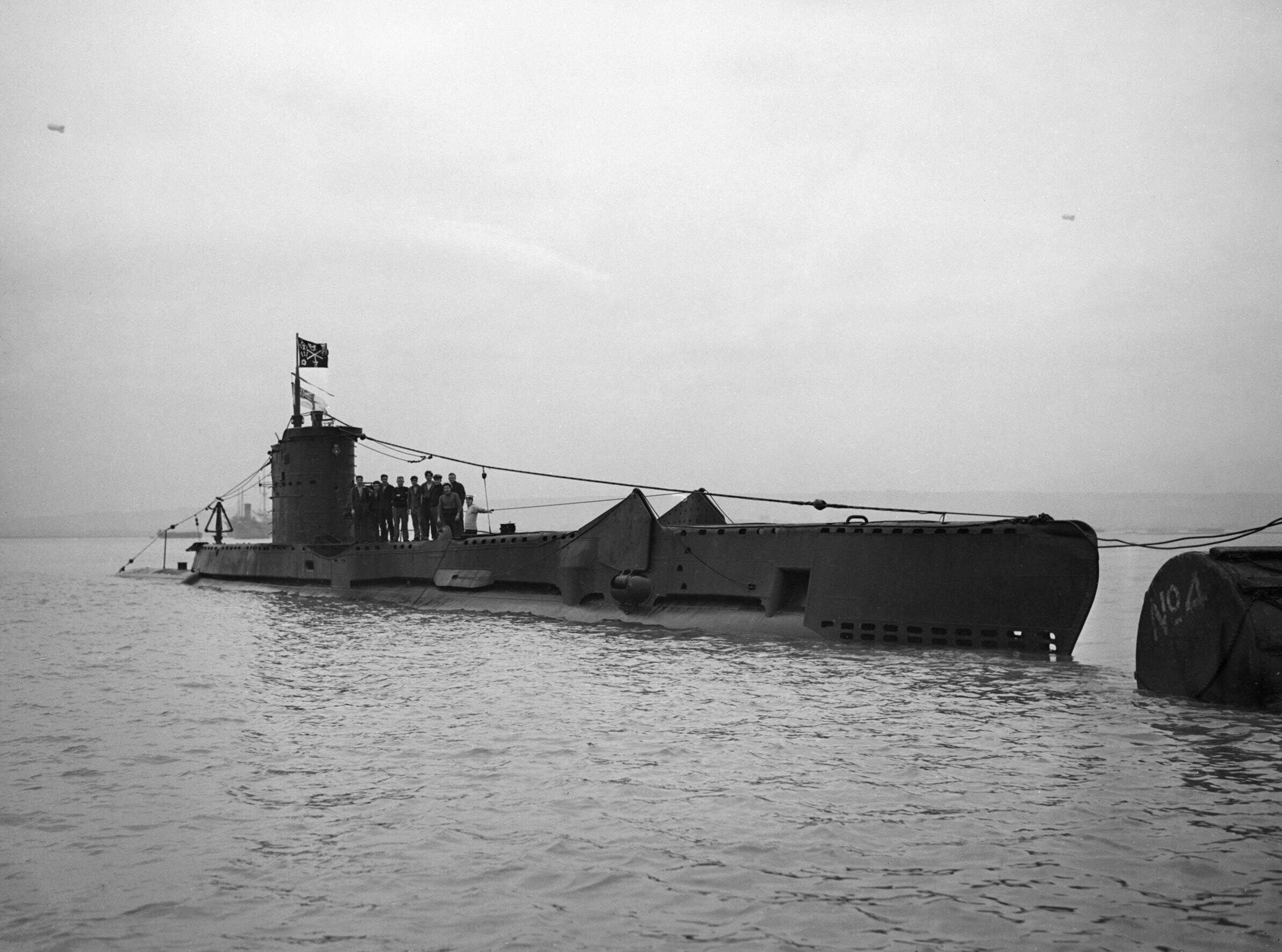

History

United Kingdom
- Name: HMS Unseen
- Builder: Vickers-Armstrongs, Barrow-in-Furness
- Laid down: 30 July 1941
- Launched: 16 April 1942
- Commissioned: 2 July 1942
- Fate: Scrapped September 1949
- Badge

General characteristics
- Class & type: U-class submarine
- Displacement: Surfaced - 540 tons standard, 630 tons full load; Submerged - 730 tons
- Length: 58.22 m (191 ft)
- Beam: 4.90 m (16 ft 1 in)
- Draught: 4.62 m (15 ft 2 in)
- Propulsion: 2 shaft diesel-electric; 2 Paxman Ricardo diesel generators + electric motors; 615 / 825 hp
- Speed: 11.25 knots (20.8 km/h) max surfaced; 10 knots (19 km/h) max submerged
- Complement: 27-31
- Armament: 4 bow internal 21 inch (533 mm) torpedo tubes - 8 - 10 torpedoes; 1 - 3-inch (76 mm) gun

HMS Unseen (P51) was a Royal Navy U-class submarine built by Vickers-Armstrongs at Barrow-in-Furness.

== Career ==
Unseen spent most of her wartime career in the Mediterranean, where she sank the Italian merchants Zenobia Martini, Le Tre Marie and Rastello (the former Greek Messaryas Nomikos), the Italian naval auxiliary Sportivo, the German auxiliary submarine chaser UJ-2205 (the former French Le Jacques Coeur), the Italian sailing vessel Fabiola, the German minelayer Brandenburg (the former French Kita), the German nightfighter direction vessel Kreta (the former French Ile de Beauté) and the German barge F 541. Unseen also destroyed the wreck of the German merchant Macedonia and a salvage barge.

Unseen also launched unsuccessful attacks against the Italian merchant Saluzzo (the former French Tamara), and what is identified as an Italian Capitani Romani class cruiser.

Unseen survived the war and was scrapped at Hayle in September 1949.
