= Danziger Werft =

International Shipbuilding and Engineering Company, Limited
- Industry: Shipbuilding
- Founded: 1919
- Defunct: 1940
- Fate: Taken over by Nazi government during World War II
- Successor: Gdańsk Shipyard
- Headquarters: Free City of Danzig
- Products: Merchant ships Warships; U-boats

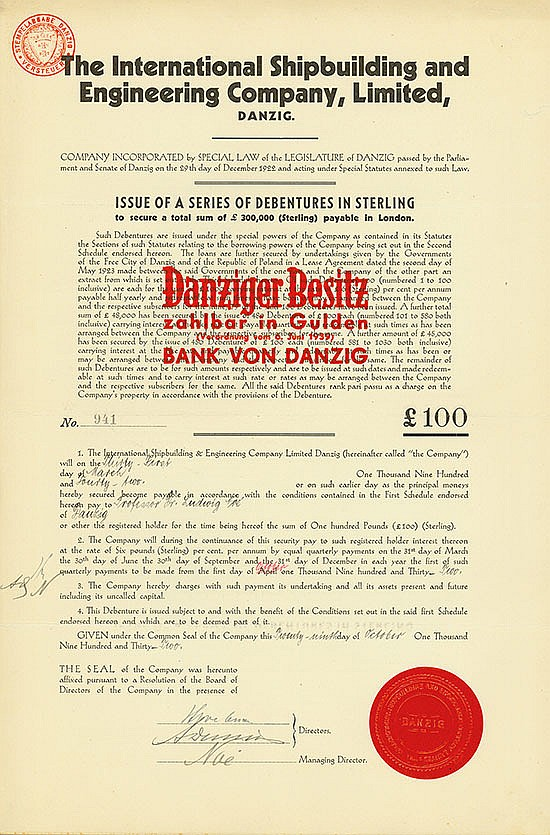
1932 stock certificate of the company

Danziger Werft (English: The International Shipbuilding and Engineering Company Limited, Polish: Stocznia Gdańska) was a shipbuilding company, in Danzig (now Gdańsk, Poland), in what was then the Free City of Danzig. It was founded in 1921 on the site of the former Kaiserliche Werft Danzig that had been closed after World War I.

== History ==
After the World War I ended, Danzig was turned into a free city under indirect control of the League of Nations. While technically an independent state, Danzig was also subject to Treaty of Versailles, other post-war arrangements and demilitarisation of Germany. Because of that, in 1919 former Kaiserliche Werft was banned from producing military vessels. Pending further decisions of the victorious Entente with regards to German arms industry, in October 1919 the new German government officially donated the shipyard and all of its assets to the city of Danzig. The new owners were also forced to scrap the final 33 U-boats still on slips in 1918.

However, as the company lost both its main client (the Kaiserliche Marine) and its raison d'etre, in 1922 it had to be commercialised. It was turned into a joint stock company, with 30% shares held by French Groupement Industriel pour Danzig conglomerate, 30% by British Cravens company, and remaining 40% by local Danziger Privat Aktienbank and Polish Bank Handlowy (20% each). The new company used the name of "International Shipbuilding and Engineering Company Limited", but was most commonly referred to by its simplified German name: Danziger Werft ("Danzig Shipyard") (Note: The full German name of the new company was Danziger Werft und Eisenwerkstatten Aktiengesellschaft, "Danzig Shipyard and Iron Works, Incorporated".).

Although the shipyard was equipped with facilities for construction of ships up to 135 metres (443 ft) of length, initially the market was overflowing with demobilised vessels of the warring nations. One of the first clients of the new company was Poland who ordered four large river monitors in 1920, shortly before Danzig was officially demilitarised. The four units were completed, but no further orders for large ships followed. Until the end of the 1920s the shipyard was working well below capacity, mostly on small merchant ships, tugs and motor boats. By the end of the decade some larger merchant vessels were ordered, but the orders soon plummeted due to the Great Depression.

It was not until the late 1930s when the shipyard finally recovered from the post-war crisis. A new tool shop was built, along with a new boiler plant, compressed air workshop, compressor plant and a new slip for vessels of up to 150 metres (490 ft) in length. License production of MAN ship engines was also started.

Following the outbreak of World War II and the German takeover of Danzig, the shipyard was taken over by Nazi authorities, initially informally, and officially on 30 August 1940. The new company, this time officially known as "Danziger Werft AG" concentrated its activities on the construction of the Type VII U-boats for the Kriegsmarine. The Polish resistance conducted espionage of the Danziger Werft.

After World War II the Danziger Werft, which was considerably damaged by bombing raids, was mostly dismantled by the Soviet Union. Eventually the shipyard was taken over by Polish government and merged with the nearby Schichau-Werke shipyard under the name of Stocznia Gdańska. Since 1990 named Stocznia Gdańsk Spółka Akcyjna or Gdańsk Shipyard it is still in existence today as the largest Polish shipyard.
