= 20th U-boat Flotilla =

20. Unterseebootsflottille
- Active: June 1943–February 1945
- Country: Nazi Germany
- Branch: Kriegsmarine
- Type: U-boat flotilla
- Garrison/HQ: Pillau

Commanders
- Notable commanders: Korvkpt. Ernst Mengersen

20th U-boat Flotilla ("20. Unterseebootsflottille") was a training flotilla ("Ausbildungsflottille ") of Nazi Germany's Kriegsmarine during World War II.

The flotilla was formed in Pillau, in June 1943 under the command of Korvettenkapitän Ernst Mengersen, and specialised in tactical training (Vortaktische Ausbildung). It was disbanded in February 1945.
