= 18th U-boat Flotilla =

- Active: January–March 1945
- Country: Nazi Germany
- Branch: Kriegsmarine
- Type: U-boat flotilla
- Garrison/HQ: Hel, Poland
- Engagements: World War II

The 18th U-boat Flotilla (German 18. Unterseebootsflottille) was a short-lived unit of Nazi Germany's Kriegsmarine during World War II.

The flotilla was formed in Hel, Poland, in January 1945 under the command of Korvettenkapitän Rudolf Franzius. Officially a training flotilla (Ger. Ausbildungsflottille), the four U-boats were in combat in the Baltic Sea. It was disbanded in March 1945.

== Assigned U-boats ==
Four U-boats were assigned to this flotilla during its service.

- U-1008
- U-1161
- U-1162
- UD-4
