= Convoy battles of World War II =

Attacks on warships protecting cargo ships

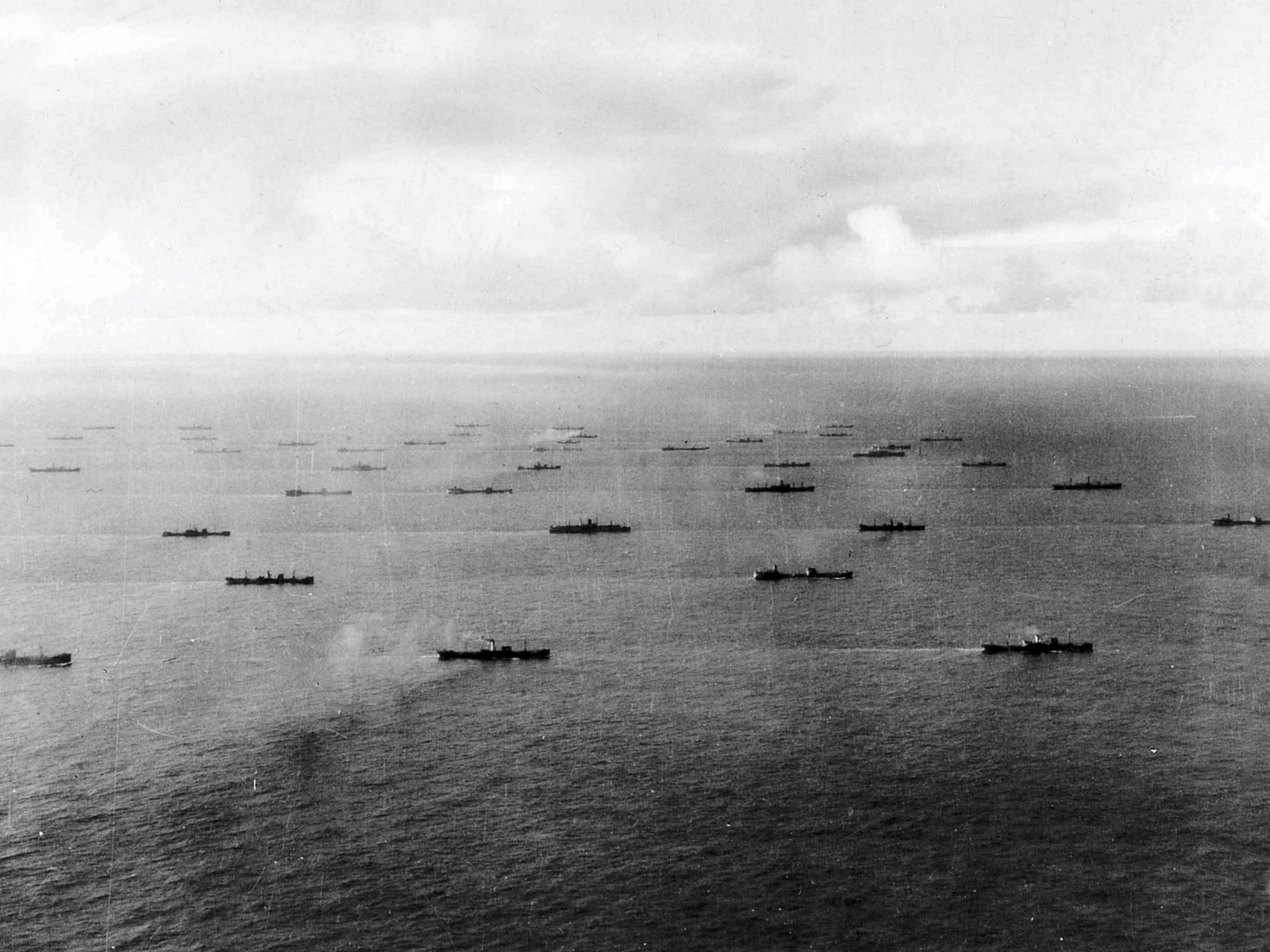
An Allied convoy in mid-Atlantic near Iceland, 1942

Convoy Battles of World War II occurred when convoys of warships protected cargo ships assembled for mutual defence and were attacked by submarines, surface ships and/or aircraft. Most were in the North Atlantic from 1939 to 1943 and involved attacks by U-boat wolfpacks. Convoy battles also occurred in the Arctic Ocean, Mediterranean Sea and western Pacific Ocean.

== Battles ==
Convoy	Escort	Located	Ships	Bombers	U-boats	Sunk	GRT
Convoy HX 65	—	24 August 1940	—	12	3	7	42,311
Convoy HX 72	—	20 September 1940	—	—	9	11	72,727
Convoy SC 7	—	16 October 1940	—	—	7	20	79,592
Convoy HX 79	—	19 October 1940	—	—	5	12	75,069
Convoy HX 84	HMS Jervis Bay	5 November 1940	Scheer	—	—	5	33,331
Convoy HX 90	—	1 December 1940	—	—	7	11	73,958
Convoy HG 53	—	8 February 1941	Hipper	5	1	9	15,218
Convoy SL 64	—	12 February 1941	Hipper	—	—	7	32,806
Convoy OB 293	—	7 March 1941	—	—	4	2	27,206
Convoy HX 112	5th EG	15 March 1941	—	—	5	5	34,505
Convoy SC 26		1 April 1941	—	—	8	10	51,969
Convoy OB 318	3rd EG	7 May 1941	—	—	4	9	50,985
Convoy HX 126	HMS Aurania	19 May 1941	—	—	11	9	51,862
Convoy OG 69	—	24 July 1941	—	—	8	7	11,303
Convoy OG 71	—	17 August 1941	—	—	8	10	15,185
Convoy SC 42	NEF 24th EG	9 September 1941	—	—	19	16	68,259
Convoy HG 73	—	19 September 1941	—	—	5	10	25,818
Operation Halberd	Force H	25 September 1941	2 × BB	62	11	1	12,427
Convoy SC 48	EG 4.1.15	15 October 1941	—	—	9	11	49,835
Convoy HG 76	36th EG	16 December 1941	—	—	10	4	18,383
Convoy NA 2	—	31 January 1942	—	—	4	1	1,190
ON 67	TU 4.1.5	21 February 1942	—	—	5	8	54,750
Second Battle of Sirte (Convoy MW 10)	—	21 March 1942	Littorio	9	3	2	17,031
Convoy PQ 13	—	28 March 1942	—	—	9	2	11,507
Convoy ON 92	A-3	11 May 1942	—	—	6	7	36,284
Convoy ON 100	C-1	8 June 1942	—	—	6	5	20,478
Operation Vigorous (Convoy MW 11)	—	12 June 1942	—	—	6	2	12,915
Operation Harpoon (Convoy GM 4)	Force X	14 June 1942	—	—	—	4	29,129
Convoy PQ 17	1st EG	1 July 1942	—	202 sorties	9	16	102,311
Convoy ON 115	C-3	29 July 1942	—	—	12	3	21,456
Convoy SC 94	C-1	5 August 1942	—	—	17	11	53,421
Operation Pedestal (Convoy WS.5.21.S)	—	10 August 1942	—	316	2	9	88,812
Convoy ON 122	B-6	22 August 1942	—	—	14	4	17,235
Convoy ON 127	C-4	9 September 1942	—	—	12	8	51,619
Convoy PQ 18	—	12 September 1942	—	77	5	3	19,689
Convoy SC 100	C-4	18 September 1942	—	—	17	5	26,331
Convoy QP 14	—	20 September 1942	—	—	7	6	23,474
Convoy RB 1	—	23 September 1942	—	—	9	3	11,525
Convoy SC 104	B-6	12 October 1942	—	—	17	8	43,970
Convoy HX 212	A-3	26 October 1942	—	—	13	6	51,918
Convoy SL 125	—	27 October 1942	—	—	10	12	80,005
Convoy SC 107	C-4	30 October 1942	—	—	16	15	82,817
Convoy ON 144	B-6	15 November 1942	—	—	13	6	26,321
Convoy ON 153	B-7	15 December 1942	—	—	13	4	19,551
Convoy JW 51B	—	24 December 1942	2 × Heavy cruiser	—	1	—	—
Convoy ONS 154	C-1	26 December 1942	0	—	16	14	66,922
Convoy TM 1	B-5	3 January 1943	—	—	14	7	56,453
Convoy SC 118	B-2	4 February 1943	—	—	20	11	59,765
Convoy ON 166	A-3	21 February 1943	—	—	19	14	88,001
Convoy UC 1	44th EG	22 February 1943	—	—	11	3	26,682
Battle of the Bismarck Sea (Convoy 81)	8 × DD	1 March 1943	10 × MTB	114	—	8	37,324
Convoy SC 121	A-3	6 March 1943	—	—	26	12	55,661
Convoy HX 228	B-3	10 March 1943	—	—	19	5	25,515
Convoy UGS 6		12 March 1943	—	—	17	4	28,018
Convoy HX 229	B-4	16 March 1943	—	—	43	13	93,502
Convoy SC 122	B-5	17 March 1943	—	—	43	9	53,094
Convoy RS 3		27 March 1943	—	—	7	3	15,389
Convoy HX 231	B-7	4 April 1943	—	—	11	6	41,494
Convoy ONS 5	B-7	28 April 1943	—	—	55	13	61,958
Convoy TS 37	—	30 April 1943	—	—	1	7	43,255
Convoy SC 130	—	18 May 1943	—	—	25	—	—
Convoy JW 55B	—	22 December 1943	Scharnhorst	—	2	—	—
Convoy JW 56A	—	25 January 1944	—	—	4	3	21,584
Convoy Hi-40	Shimushu	19 February 1944	—	—	2	5	28,075
Convoy Hi-71	6th EG	17 August 1944	—	—	6	5	73,071
Convoy Hi-81	8th EG	15 November 1944	—	1	6	3	36,100
