= Convoy HX 212 =

Convoy during naval battles of the Second World War

- Part of Battle of the Atlantic
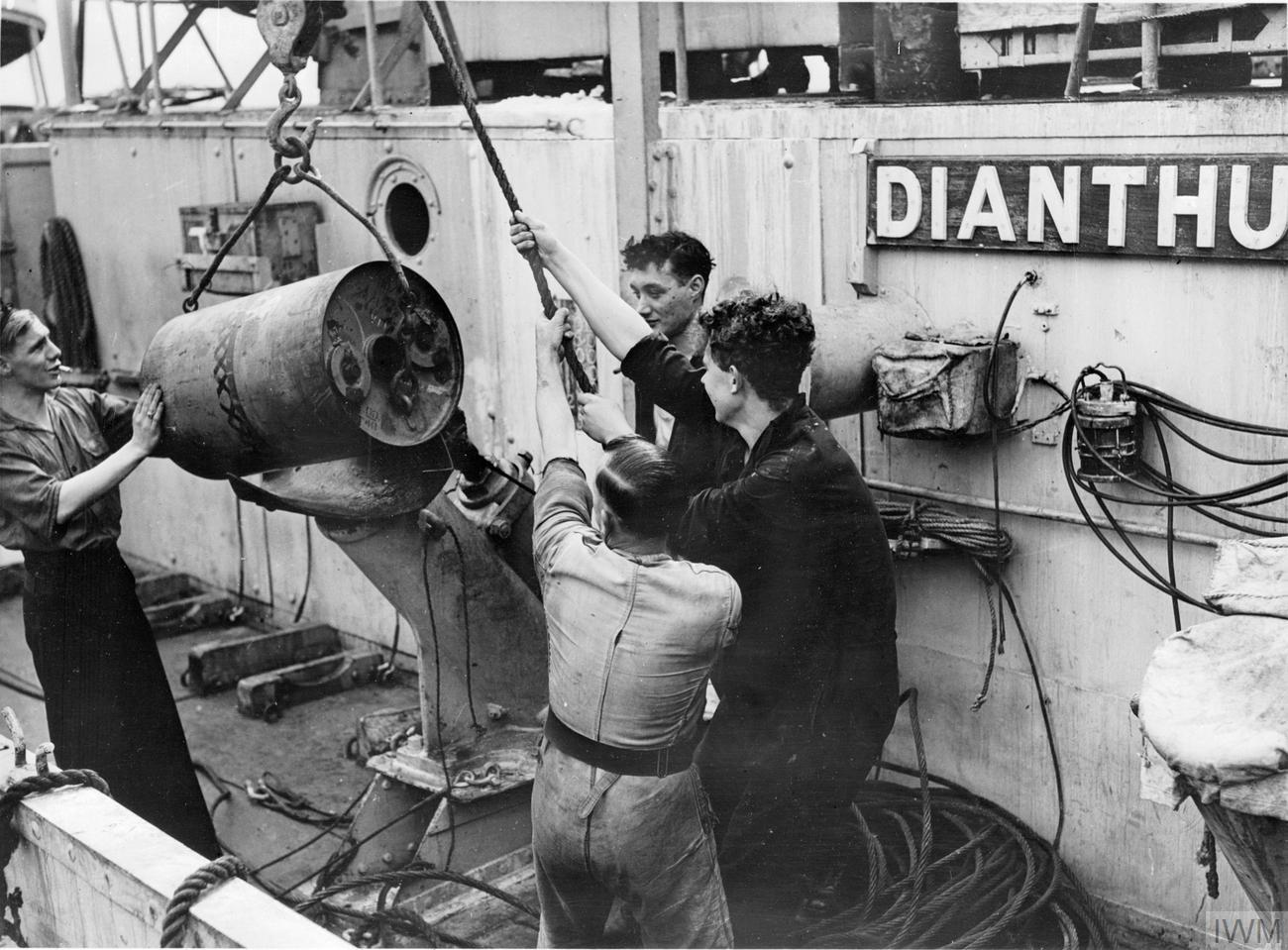
- A depth charge being loaded onto a depth-charge thrower aboard the corvette HMS Dianthus
Date	26–29 October 1942
Location	North Atlantic
Result	German tactical victory

Belligerents
United Kingdom; United States; Canada	Germany

Commanders and leaders
VADM W de M Egerton; CDR T. L. Lewis USCG	Admiral Karl Dönitz

Strength
43 freighters 1 destroyer 1 cutter 6 corvettes	17 submarines

Casualties and losses
6 freighters sunk (51,997 GRT); 243 killed/drowned	

Convoy HX 212 was the 212th of the numbered series of World War II HX convoys of merchant ships from HalifaX to Liverpool. The ships departed New York City on 18 October 1942 and were met on 23 October by Mid-Ocean Escort Force Group A-3 consisting of the United States Coast Guard Treasury-class cutter USCGC Campbell, the destroyer Badger and the Flower-class corvettes Dianthus, Rosthern, Trillium, Dauphin, Alberni, Summerside and Ville de Quebec. The first five escorts had worked together previously, but the last three corvettes were attached to the convoy only for passage to the eastern Atlantic in preparation for assignments on Operation Torch. Summerside was the only escort equipped with modern Type 271 centimeter-wavelength radar.

== Background ==
As western Atlantic coastal convoys brought an end to the second happy time, Admiral Karl Dönitz, the Befehlshaber der U-Boote (BdU) or commander in chief of U-Boats, shifted focus to the mid-Atlantic to avoid aircraft patrols. Although convoy routing was less predictable in the mid-ocean, Dönitz anticipated that the increased numbers of U-boats being produced would be able to effectively search for convoys with the advantage of intelligence gained through B-Dienst decryption of British Naval Cypher Number 3. However, only 20 percent of the 180 trans-Atlantic convoys sailing from the end of July 1942 until the end of April 1943 lost ships to U-boat attack.

== 26 October ==
U-436 reported the convoy and shadowed it without being detected by the convoy escort.

== 27 October ==
U-436 launched five torpedoes at 2110Z hitting Sourabaya, Gurney Newlin and Frontenac. Alberni and Summerside dropped back to rescue survivors from the torpedoed ships.

== 28 October ==
U-606 torpedoed Kosmos II on the starboard side at 0345Z. Barrwhin dropped back to rescue survivors, and both ships were sunk while the convoy proceeded ahead. A patrolling Consolidated B-24 Liberator from No. 120 Squadron RAF in Iceland prevented five U-boats from reaching attack positions during daylight hours but Bic Island and Pan-New York were torpedoed after sunset.

== 29 October ==
Northern routing enabled the convoy to pass through the narrowest portion of the air gap, and continuous daylight air patrols forced the U-boats to lose contact with the convoy. The Naval trawlers Bodo and Molde escorted the convoy through the Western Approaches on 1 November; and the convoy reached Liverpool on 2 November.

== Ships in convoy ==
Name	Flag	Dead	Tonnage (GRT)	Cargo	Notes
Abraham Lincoln (1929)	Norway		5,740	General Cargo	Carried convoy vice-commodore CAPT B B Grant RNR; survived this convoy and convoy HX 229
Arc Light (1906)	United Kingdom		2,949		
Barrwhin (1929)	United Kingdom	24	4,998	8,200 tons grain & stores	Veteran of convoy PQ 11; sunk 29 October by U-436
USS Beaver (AS-5) (1909)	United States		4,670	Explosives	
Belgian Gulf (1929)	Panama		8,237	Petrol	Survived this convoy and convoy HX 229
Bic Island (1917)	United Kingdom		4,000	General Cargo	Straggled and sunk by U-224
British Vigilance (1942)	United Kingdom		8,093	Benzine & 130 passengers	Survived this convoy to be sunk 3 months later in convoy TM 1
C.J.Barkdull (1917)	Panama		6,773	Diesel oil	Survived this convoy to be sunk 1/10/1943 by U 632
Cairnesk (1926)	United Kingdom		5,007	General Cargo	
Cape Breton (1940)	United Kingdom		6,044	Phosphates	
City of Lille (1928)	United Kingdom		6,588	Wheat	
Coptic (1928)	United Kingdom		10,629	Refrigerated & General Cargo	
Cymbula (1938)	United Kingdom		8,082	Petrol	
Dorchester (1926)	United States		5,649		From Newfoundland to Greenland; survived this convoy to be sunk 3 months later in convoy SG 19
Empire Bronze (1940)	United Kingdom		8,142	Paraffin & Aviation Gasoline	
Empire Dickens (1942)	United Kingdom		9,819	Petrol	
Empire Fletcher (1942)	United Kingdom		8,194	Petrol	
Esso Bayway (1937)	United States		7,699	Furnace Fuel Oil	
Exchester (1919)	United States		4,999	Stores	
Exilona (1919)	United States		4,971	Steel	Survived this convoy, convoy ON 166 and convoy HX 300
Fairfax (1926)	United Kingdom		5,649		From Newfoundland to Greenland
Fort a la Corne (1942)	United Kingdom		7,133	General Cargo	
Fort Amherst (1936)	United Kingdom		3,489		
Francis Parkman (1942)	United States		7,176	Stores	Liberty ship
Frontenac (1928)	Norway		7,350	Fuel Oil	Damaged 27 October by U-436, but survived to sail with convoy HX 300
Gdynia (1934)	Sweden		1,636	General Cargo	
Gulfgem (1920)	United States		6,917	Furnace Fuel Oil for Scapa Flow	
Gurney E Newlin (1942)	United States	60	8,225	12,000 tons petrol & paraffin	Sunk 27 October by U-436 & U-606
Helgoy (1920)	Norway		5,614	General Cargo	
Jamaica Planter (1936)	United Kingdom		4,098	Refrigerated & General Cargo	Carried convoy commodore VADM W DE M Egerton
Katy (1931)	Norway		6,825	Petrol	
Kosmos II (1931)	Norway	40	16,966	21,000 tons crude oil	Damaged 27 October by U-436 and sunk on 28 October by U-606 & U-624
Lancastrian Prince (1940)	United Kingdom		1,914	General Cargo	Veteran of convoy ON 67
Laurelwood (1929)	United Kingdom		7,347	furnace fuel oil	
Mahia (1917)	United Kingdom		10,014	Refrigerated	
Matthew Luckenbach (1918)	United States		5,848	Steel & General Cargo	Returned to Canada; sunk 5 months later in convoy HX 229
Ocean Courier (1942)	United Kingdom		7,178	General Cargo	Liberty ship
Pacific Shipper (1924)	United Kingdom		6,290	General Cargo	
Pan-New York (1938)	United States	42	7,701	12,500 tons petrol	Sunk 29 October by U-624
Pan-Rhode Island (1941)	United States		7,742	Aviation Gasoline	Survived this convoy and convoy HX 229
Paul H Harwood (1918)	United States		6,610	Diesel Oil	
R.G.Stewart (1917)	United States		9,229		
Saint Bertrand (1929)	United Kingdom		5,522	General Cargo	
Salinas (1920)	United States		5,422		
Sarpedon (1923)	United Kingdom		11,321	Refrigerated	
Skaraas (1936)	Norway		9,826	Oil	
Snar (1920)	Norway		3,176		
Sourabaya (1915)	United Kingdom	77	10,107	7,800 tons furnace fuel oil	Sunk 27 October by U-436
Southern Princess (1915)	United Kingdom		12,156	Furnace Fuel Oil	Survived this convoy to be sunk 5 months later in convoy HX 229
Thomas B Robertson (1942)	United States		7,176	stores	Liberty ship; survived this convoy and convoy ON 166
Topdalsfjord (1921)	Norway		4,271	Sugar & Timber	
Tudor Prince (1940)	United Kingdom		1,914	General Cargo	
Zacapa (1909)	United States		4,488	Valuable cargo	
Zoella Lykes (1940)	United States		6,829		

== See also ==
- Convoy Battles of World War II
