= K242 =

K242 or K-242 may refer to:

- K-242 (Kansas highway), a former state highway in Kansas
- HMCS Ville de Quebec (K242), a former Canadian Navy ship
- K.242 Piano Concerto No. 7 (Mozart) in F major for three pianos, "Lodron" (1776)
