= MV Chama =

History
- Name: Empire Fletcher (1942–44); Backhuysen (1944–47); Chama (1947–55); Anastasia (1955–59)
- Owner: Ministry of War Transport (1942–44); Dutch Government (1944–47); NV Petroleum Maatschappij (1947–55); Derna Compagnia de Navegacion SA (1955–59)
- Operator: Haldin & Phillips Ltd (1942–44); NV Petroleum Maatschappij (1944–55); J Livanos & Sons Ltd (1955–59)
- Port of registry: Belfast, United Kingdom (1942–44); The Hague, Netherlands (1944–55); Monrovia, Liberia (1955–59)
- Builder: Harland & Wolff, Belfast
- Yard number: 1081
- Launched: 4 April 1942
- Completed: 31 July 1942
- Out of service: 9 September 1959
- Identification: United Kingdom Official Number 185514 (1942–44); Code Letters BDYV (1942–44); Dutch Official Number 6841 (1944–55); Code Letters PCXK (1944-47); Code Letters PDJZ (1947–55)
- Fate: Scrapped

General characteristics
- Class & type: Tanker (1942–55); Bulk carrier (1955–59)
- Tonnage: 8,194 GRT; 4,777 NRT; 11,860 DWT
- Length: 483 ft 0 in (147.22 m) overall; 465 ft 6 in (141.88 m) between perpendiculars
- Beam: 54 ft 2 in (16.51 m)
- Draught: 27 ft 6.25 in (8.39 m)
- Depth: 27 ft 9 in (8.46 m)
- Installed power: 490 nhp diesel engine
- Propulsion: Single screw propeller
- Speed: 11.5 knots (21.3 km/h)

Chama was a 8,194 GRT tanker that was built in 1942 as Empire Fletcher by Harland & Wolff, Belfast, County Down, United Kingdom for the Ministry of War Transport (MoWT). She was transferred to the Dutch Government in 1944 and renamed Backhuysen. She was sold to NV Petroleum Maatschappij in 1947 and renamed Chama. She was sold to Derna Compagnia de Navegacion SA, Liberia in 1955 and renamed Anastasia, serving until scrapped in 1959.

== Description ==
The ship was built in 1942 by Harland & Wolff Ltd, Belfast, County Down, United Kingdom. She was yard number 1081.

The ship was 483 ft 0 in (147.22 m) long overall (465 ft 6 in (141.88 m) between perpendiculars), with a beam of 59 feet 5 inches (18.11 m). She had a depth of 27 feet 9 inches (8.46 m) and a draught of 27 feet 6.25 inches (8.39 m). She was assessed at 8,194 GRT, 4,777 NRT, 11,860 DWT.

The ship was propelled by a four-stroke Single Cycle, Single Action diesel engine, which had six cylinders of 29 1/2 inches (75 cm) diameter by 59 7/16 inches (151 cm) stroke driving a screw propeller. The engine was built by Harland & Wolff Ltd, Glasgow. It was rated at 490 nhp. It could propel her at 11.5 knots (21.3 km/h).

== History ==
The ship was built by Harland & Wolff Ltd, Belfast, County Down, United Kingdom for the MoWT. She was launched on 4 April 1942 and completed in July 1942. The Code Letters BDYV and United Kingdom Official Number 185514 were allocated. Her port of registry was Belfast. She was operated under the management of Haldin & Phillips Ltd.

Empire Fletcher was delivered on 31 July 1942. She sailed on her maiden voyage from the Belfast Lough on 6 August to join Convoy ON 119, which had departed from Liverpool, Lancashire the previous day and arrived at New York on 20 August. She returned to the Belfast Lough due to unspecified defects. She sailed on 29 August to join Convoy ON 125, which had departed from Liverpool the previous day and arrived at New York on 12 September. She sailed on 18 September with Convoy NK 503, which arrived at Key West, Florida on 24 September. She then joined Convoy KH 406, which sailed that day and arrived at Galveston, Texas on 27 September. A cargo of petrol was loaded. Empire Fletcher was a member of Convoy HK 108, which sailed on 2 October and arrived at Key West on 6 October. She sailed that day with Convoy KN 204, which arrived at New York on 12 October. She sailed on 18 October with Convoy HX 212, which arrived at Liverpool on 2 November.

Empire Fletcher sailed on 17 November with Convoy ON 147, which arrived at New York on 4 December. Her destination was Halifax, Nova Scotia, Canada, where she arrived on 3 December. She was loaded with a cargo of petrol and sailed on 5 December with Convoy HX 218, which arrived at Liverpool on 21 December.

Empire Fletcher sailed on 4 January 1943 with Convoy ON 159, which arrived at New York on 20 January. Laden with avgas, she returned with Convoy HX 225, which sailed on 30 January and arrived at Liverpool on 13 February. She left the convoy at the Belfast Lough to join Convoy BB 263, which sailed on 14 February and arrived at Milford Haven, Pembrokeshire the next day. She then joined Convoy WP 296, which sailed on 17 February and arrived at Portsmouth, Hampshire two days later. Her destination was Falmouth, Cornwall, which was reached on 18 February.

Empire Fletcher sailed on 1 March to join Convoy PW 301, which had departed from Portsmouth the previous day and arrived at Milford Haven on 3 March. She then sailed to the Belfast Lough and joined Convoy ON 170, which departed rom Liverpool on 3 March and arrived at New York on 20 March. Empire Fletcher sailed on 2 April to join Convoy UGS 7, which had departed from the Hampton Roads the previous day and arrived at Bône, Algeria on 22 April. Empire Fletcher sailed on 27 April with Convoy ET 19, which arrived at Gibraltar on 2 May. She sailed on 8 May to join Convoy GUS 7, which passed Gibraltar on 9 May and arrived at the Hampton Roads on 26 May. Her destination was New York, which was reached that day. Laden with a cargo of petrol, Empire Fletcher sailed with Convoy HX 242 on 31 May, arriving at Liverpool on 15 June. She left the convoy and arrived at the Belfast Lough that day.

Empire Fletcher sailed on 1 July to join Convoy ON 191, which had sailed from Liverpool that day and arrived at New York on 15 July. She sailed the next day with Convoy NG 374, which arrived at Guantanamo Bay, Cuba on 23 July. Empire Fletcher sailed that day with Convoy GAT 76, which arrived at Trinidad on 29 July. She left the convoy at Curaçao, Netherlands Antilles, arriving on 26 July. She sailed on 1 August to join Convoy GAT 77, which had sailed from Guantanamo Bay on 28 July and arrived at Trinidad on 3 August. She sailed with Convoy TJ 4 on 4 August. The convoy arrived at Rio de Janeiro, Brazil on 24 August, but Empire Fletcher put back, Arriving at Trinidad on 15 August. She sailed on 17 August with Convoy TAG 79, which arrived at Guantanamo Bay on 22 August. Her destination was Curaçao, where she arrived on 20 August. Having loaded a cargo of paraffin and petrol, she sailed four days later to join Convoy TAG 80, which had departed from Trinidad on 22 August and arrived at Guantanamo Bay on 27 August. She sailed that day with Convoy GN 80, which arrived at New York on 3 September. Empire Fletcher was a member of Convoy HX 256, which sailed on 9 September and arrived at Liverpool on 21 September. She sailed on to Avonmouth, Somerset, arriving on 24 September.

Empire Fletcher sailed for Newport, Monmouthshire on 29 September, arriving the next day. She departed two days later for Milford Haven, where she arrived on 4 October. She departed on 5 October to join Convoy ON 205, which departed from Liverpool that day and arrived at New York on 23 October. She sailed on 28 October with Convoy NK 574, which arrived at Key West on 4 November. She sailed that day for New Orleans, Louisiana. She sailed on 11 November and later joined Convoy HK 155, which had departed from Galveston on 11 August and arrived at Key West on 15 November. She joined Convoy KG 670, which sailed that day and arrived at Guantanamo Bay on 18 November. She sailed on 25 November with Convoy GZ 51, which arrived at Cristóbal, Colón, Panama on 30 November. Empire Fletcher departed on 12 December for Aruba, Netherlands Antilles, arriving on 16 December. She sailed the next day to join Convoy GAT 105, which had departed from Guantanamo Bay on 14 December and arrived at Trinidad on 20 December. She departed on 22 December for Rio de Janeiro, where she arrived on 11 January 1944. She may have been a member of Convoy TJ 18. She then sailed to Santos, São Paulo, Brazil, from where she departed on 17 January for Rio de Janeiro, arriving the next day. Empire Fletcher sailed on 27 January with Convoy JT 21, which arrived at Trinidad on 12 February. She departed the next day with Convoy TAG 115, which arrived at Guantanamo Bay on 18 February. She put into Curaçao, arriving on 15 February and sailing five days later to join Convoy TAG 116, which had departed from Trinidad on 18 February and arrived at Guantanamo Bay on 23 February. She sailed that day with Convoy GN 116, which arrived at New York on 29 February. She sailed with Convoy HX 282 on 6 March, arriving at Liverpool on 22 March with a cargo of avgas and petrol.

On 31 March, Empire Fletcher was transferred to the Dutch Government and renamed Backhuysen. The Dutch Official Number 6841 and Code Letters PCXK were allocated. Her port of registry was The Hague. She was placed under the management of NV Petroleum Maatschappij, Den Haag.

Baclhuysen sailed on 7 April with Convoy ON 231, which arrived at New York on 24 April. Laden with avgas, she departed on 27 April with Convoy HX 289, which arrived at Liverpool on 13 May. She left the convoy and put into Loch Ewe, arriving on 14 May. Backhuysen sailed with Convoy WN 582, which sailed that day and arrived at Methil on 16 May. She sailed the next day with Convoy FS 1455, which arrived at Southend on 19 May.

Backhuysen departed from Southend on 24 May with Convoy FN 1367, which arrived at Methil on 26 May. She then joined Convoy EN389, which sailed the next day and arrived at Loch Ewe on 29 May. She then joined Convoy ON 239, which had departed from Liverpool on 3 June and arrived at New York on 22 June. She sailed for the Hampton Roads on 1 July, from where she joined Convoy UGS 47, which sailed on 4 July and arrived at Port Said, Egypt on 29 July. Her destination was Augusta, Sicily, Italy, which was reached on 25 July. She then joined Convoy AH 57, which sailed that day and arrived at Bari on 27 July. Backhuysen later sailed to Brindisi, from where she departed on 6 August to join Convoy HA 59, which had sailed from Bari that day and arrived at Augusta two days later. She sailed that day to join Convoy GUS 48, which had departed from Port Said on 3 August and arrived at the Hampton Roads on 28 August. Backhuysen arrived at New York on 27 August. She sailed on 31 August for the Hampton Roads, departing on 2 September with Convoy UGS 53, which arrived at Port Said on 28 September. Her destination was Toulon, Var, France. She sailed on 3 October with Convoy ARM 10, which arrived at Oran, Algeria on 6 October. Backhuysen departed on 11 October to join Convoy GUS 54, which had sailed from Port Said on 2 October and arrived at the Hampton Roads on 28 October. She arrived a Philadelphia, Pennsylvania later that day and sailed three days later for the Hampton Roads. She departed on 1 November with Convoy UGS 59, which arrived at Port Said on 27 November. Her destination was Oran, which was reached on 19 November. She sailed that day with Convoy OM 21, arriving at Toulon on 22 November. She then sailed to Marseille, Bouches-du-Rhône, from where she departed on 27 November for Oran, arriving two days later. Backhuysen sailed on 3 December with Convoy GUS 60, which arrived at the Hampton Roads on 22 December. She detached from the convoy and arrived at Curaçao on 21 December.

Laden with Benzole, petrol and polymers, Backhuysen sailed on 7 January 1945 and arrived at New York on 15 January. She departed on 18 January with Convoy HX 333, which arrived at Liverpool on 1 February. She sailed on 6 February to join Convoy ON 283, which had departed from Southend the previous day and arrived at New York on 27 February. Backhuysen departed on 3 March for the Hampton Roads. She sailed the next day with Convoy UGS 78, which arrived at Gibraltar on 18 March. She detached from the convoy and arrived at Casablanca, Morocco that day. She sailed the next day with Convoy CG 158 but did not put into Gibraltar, which was the convoy's destination. She continued on to Oran, arriving on 21 March and sailing later that day for Marseille. She departed on 30 March for Algiers, Algeria, arriving on 1 April. Backhuysen later returned to Oran, arriving on 14 April and sailing three days later with Convoy GUS 84, which arrived at the Hampton Roads on 5 May. She detached from the Convoy and arrived at Bermuda on 3 May, sailing four days later for Port Arthur, Texas, where she arrived on 15 May. Backhuysen sailed two days later for New York, arriving on 24 May. She sailed on 29 May for London, United Kingdom, where she arrived on 11 June.

Backhuysen sailed on 19 June for New York, where she arrived on 2 July. She sailed for the Clyde on 9 July, arriving on 23 July. She departed on 26 July for Belfast, arriving two days later. Backhuysen departed on 17 August for New York, where she arrived on 29 August. She sailed two days later for New Orleans, arriving on 7 September and departing four days later for Hull, which was reached on 29 September. She sailed on 13 October for Suez, Egypt, from where she departed on 26 October for Port Said, which was reached two days later. Backhuysen later sailed for Bahrein, where she arrived on 6 November, sailing three days later for Lourenço Marques, Mozambique, where she arrived on 23 November.

In 1947, Backhuysen was sold to NV Petroleum Maatschappij and renamed Chama. The Code Letters PDJZ were allocated.

In 1955, Chama was sold to Derna Compagnia de Navegacion SA, Liberia and renamed Anastasia. Between August and October 1955 she was rebuilt as a bulk carrier in Rotterdam, South Holland. Her port of registry was Monrovia. Anastasia was operated under the management of J Livanos & Sons Ltd, London. She was sold for scrapping during the summer of 1959. Anastasia arrived at Savona, Liguria, Italy on 9 September. She was scrapped there by A.R.D.E.M. SpA.
