= Escort group =

WWII Allied Atlantic convoy escort

During World War II, an escort group consisted of several small warships organized and trained to operate together protecting trade convoys. Escort groups were a tactical innovation in anti-submarine warfare by the Royal Navy to combat the threat of the Kriegsmarine's "wolfpack" tactics. Early escort groups often contained destroyers, sloops, naval trawlers and, later, corvettes of differing specifications lacking the ability to maneuver together as a flotilla of similar warships, but rigorously trained in anti-submarine tactics to use teamwork emphasizing the unique sensors, weapons, speed, and turning radius of each ship. The development of these "escort groups" proved an effective means of defending shipping convoys through the Battle of the Atlantic.

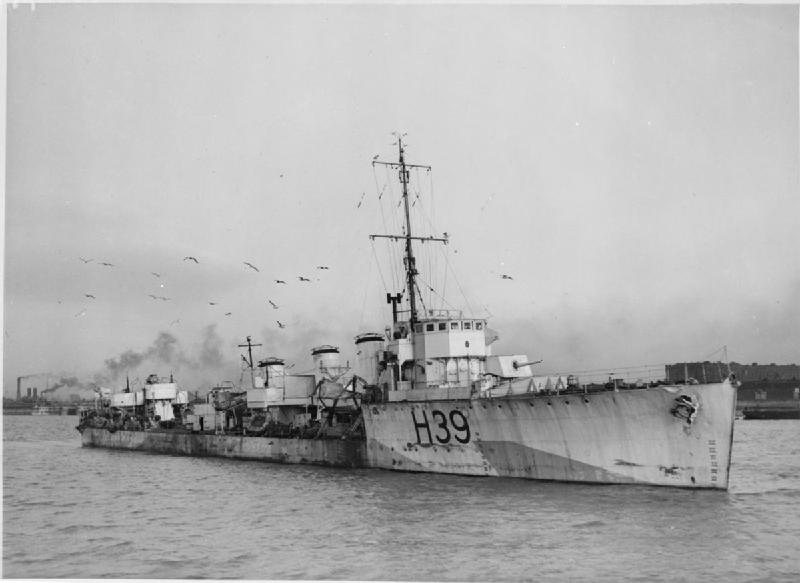
HMS Skate was one of the oldest destroyers in the Royal Navy when assigned convoy protection duty for the Western Approaches Command.

== Background ==
Based on experience during World War I, the Admiralty instituted trade convoys in United Kingdom coastal waters from September 1939. During the first year of the Battle of the Atlantic British convoy protection was the responsibility of the Western Approaches Command (WAC), based first in Plymouth, then, as the focus of the campaign moved after the 1940 Fall of France, in Liverpool. The newest and most capable destroyers were assigned to screen capital ships of the Home Fleet; so, to augment the inadequate number of purpose-designed sloops, WAC was allocated a leftover array of limited production prototypes, ships built to foreign specifications, minesweepers, militarized yachts, and fishing trawlers, and survivors of elderly destroyer classes no longer considered suitable for operation with the Home Fleet. These escorts were not numerous enough or sufficiently long-ranged to accompany convoys across the Atlantic, but would screen convoys to and from meeting points thought to be beyond U-boat range defining the edge of the Western Approaches.

Convoy escorts were initially assigned on an ad hoc basis, dispatched as and when available, and arrived singly or in small groups. Command of the escort force fell to the senior officer present and could change as each new ship arrived. Any tactical arrangements had to be made on the spot and communicated by a signal lamp to each ship in turn. The ships were unaccustomed to working together and often had no common battle plan or tactics.

These deficiencies led to a major defeat in October 1940 when Convoy HX 79 from Halifax to Liverpool was attacked by a wolfpack of five U-boats remaining after an attack on convoy SC 7. Initially unprotected, a force of 11 warships were assembled but 12 ships in the convoy were sunk from attacks during the night while none of the U-boats were damaged.

The loss of ships from both SC 7 and HX 79 gave the impetus for Admiral Percy Noble, the commander-in-chief of WAC, to form discrete groups. These Escort Groups often consisted of mixed types of small warships, but later were sometimes formed from a single class (e.g. the 1st, 3rd, 4th, 5th, 15th, and 21st Escort Groups were composed entirely of Captain-class frigates when these ships became available to replace the older ships originally assigned to those groups.)

== Service history ==
In 1941 WAC had 8 escort groups formed. These typically comprised four to eight ships, under the command of an RN officer, usually a commander or lieutenant commander. By operating together under a single leader, groups were able to develop group tactics and practice their use; with the issue of a single short command the various ships of the group, often out of sight of each other, could be relied upon to act in a coordinated fashion. In ten days in 1941, four U-boats were sunk with the loss of three of Germany's top U-boat commanders. Later these tactics were standardized and taught to all escort group commanders at the Western Approaches Tactical Unit (WATU). The WATU was an RN analysis team founded in early 1942 to study the conduct of convoy operations using wargames and lectures. The unit, made up of naval officers and the young women of the WRNS disseminated instructions to over 5,000 Allied officers with "considerable success".

This level of teamwork was never achieved by the attacking U-boats. Although the wolfpack was co-ordinated in that several boats would be concentrated on a target convoy, once gathered the boats would attack individually without any attempt at further co-operation. It was not unknown for U-boats to get in each other's way whilst attacking or collide with each other. Time and again during the Battle of the Atlantic relatively small, well-handled escort groups were able to frustrate attacks by more numerous groups of U-boats and ensure the "safe and timely arrival" of their charges. In one example, in November 1942, Convoy ON 144 of 33 ships from Britain to North America protected by the Mid-Ocean Escort Force B6 of five Flower-class corvettes, was attacked by a group of ten U-boats. Over the next three days they fought off attacks by the wolfpack for the loss of five ships and one corvette; 28 ships arrived safely. Following this action, the Senior Officer Escort (SOE) – commander of the group – was "warmly congratulated" for preventing what could have been a major disaster, and the contrast with HX 79 was apparent.

In practice, escort group cohesion was impaired by frequent changes of escort personnel and transferring ships between groups. Personnel shuffling was inevitable as trained crewmen with combat experience were promoted and transferred to the expanding fleet of new ships. Shuffling of ships from one escort group to another was often necessary to maintain escort group strength by replacing ships temporarily disabled by battle damage or the frequent machinery breakdowns of older warships. The following list includes some duplication reflecting reassignments at the time of compilation. The original eight escort groups and the Canadian 14th through 25th escort groups were reorganized into the Mid-Ocean Escort Force (MOEF) in February and March 1942 with ships of the 9th Escort Group serving as leaders of MOEF groups B1 through B5. The ships of the earlier groups which had only a short-range and were unsuitable for MOEF duty were reassigned to the Western Local Escort Force or duty with coastal convoys or the arctic convoys supplying the Soviet Union. The 36th through 44th escort groups remained relatively unchanged escorting convoys between Liverpool and Gibraltar and Sierra Leone.

== Organization ==
The following escort groups had been formed prior to United States Navy escort participation in the autumn of 1941:

=== 1st Escort Group ===
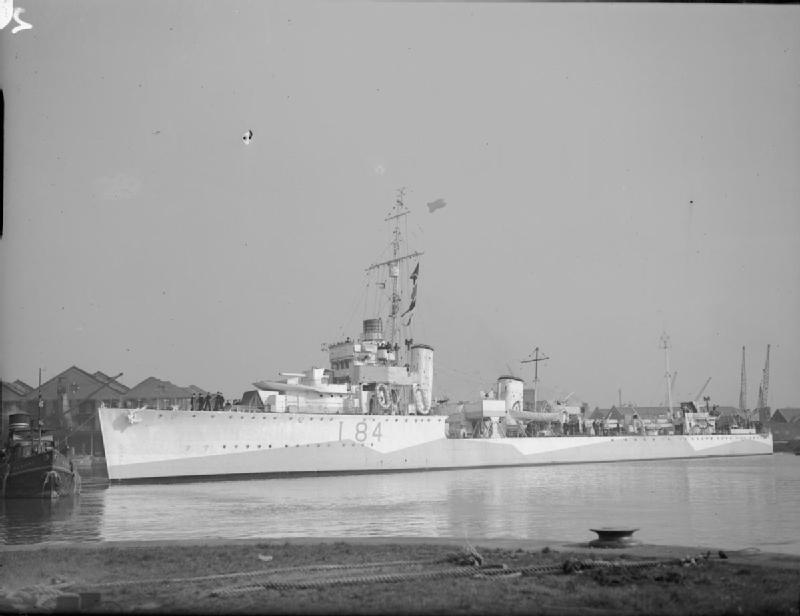
HMS Keppel was a World War I flotilla leader.

- Thornycroft type destroyer leader: HMS Keppel
- V and W-class destroyer: HMS Venomous
- Town-class destroyers: HMS Lincoln & Rockingham
- Admiralty S-class destroyers: HMS Sabre & Shikari
- Flower-class corvettes: HMS Alisma, Dianella, Kingcup & Sunflower

=== 2nd Escort Group ===
Town-class destroyers received in the Destroyers for Bases Agreement were widely distributed among the escort groups.

- Admiralty type flotilla leader: HMS Douglas
- V and W-class destroyer: HMS Veteran
- Town-class destroyers: HMS Leamington & Sherwood
- Admiralty R-class destroyer: HMS Skate
- Admiralty S-class destroyer: HMS Saladin
- Flower-class corvettes: HMS Abelia, Anemone & Veronica

=== 3rd Escort Group ===
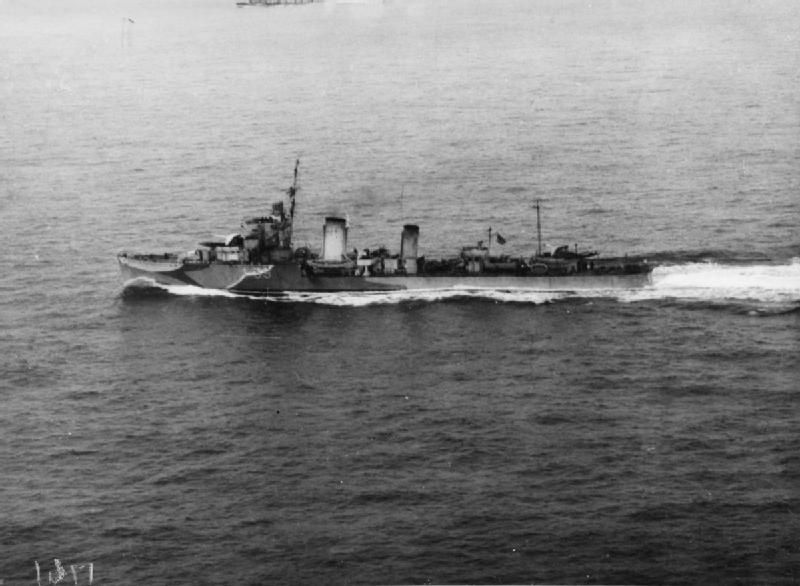
HMS Amazon was a unique prototype.

- Thornycroft prototype destroyer: HMS Amazon
- Yarrow prototype destroyer: HMS Ambuscade
- B-class destroyer: HMS Bulldog
- Town-class destroyers: HMS Belmont & Georgetown
- Flower-class corvettes: HMS Aconite, HMS Aubrietia, Heartsease, Renoncule, & Roselys

=== 4th Escort Group ===
- B-class destroyers: HMS Beagle & Boadicea
- Town-class destroyers: HMS Montgomery, Roxborough & Salisbury
- Flower-class corvettes: HMS Commandant Détroyat, Heather, Lobelia, Narcissus, Orchis, & Snowdrop

=== 5th Escort Group ===
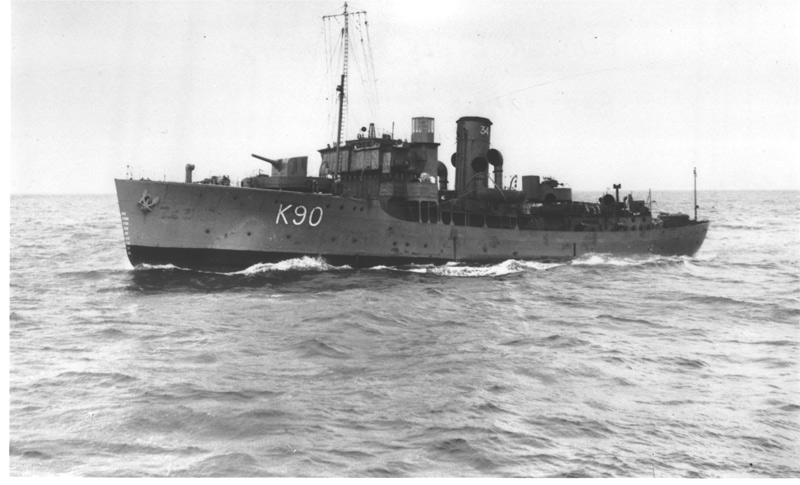
Flower-class corvettes became the most numerous of the ship types assigned to escort groups.

- V and W-class destroyers: HMS Vanoc, Volunteer & Walker
- Town-class destroyer: HMS Caldwell
- Flower-class corvettes: HMS Calendula, Campanula, Gentian, Honeysuckle, & Sweetbriar

=== 6th Escort Group ===
- Thornycroft type destroyer leader: HMS Broke
- V and W-class destroyers: HMS Verity & Wolverine
- Town-class destroyers: HMS Buxton, Chelsea & Mansfield
- Flower-class corvettes: HMS Begonia, Camellia, Clematis, Columbine, Jasmine, & Larkspur

=== 7th Escort Group ===
- V and W-class destroyers: HMS Westcott & Wanderer
- Town-class destroyers: HMS Campbeltown & St Albans
- Flower-class corvettes: HMS Acanthus, Eglantine, Gardenia, Hibiscus, Montbretia & Periwinkle

=== 8th Escort Group ===
- Admiralty type flotilla leader: HMS Malcolm
- V and W-class destroyer: HMS Watchman
- Town-class destroyers: HMS Beverley & Newmarket
- Admiralty S-class destroyers: HMS Sardonyx & Scimitar
- Flower-class corvettes: HMS Arabis, Dahlia, Monkshood, Petunia, Violet & Verbena

=== 9th Escort Group ===
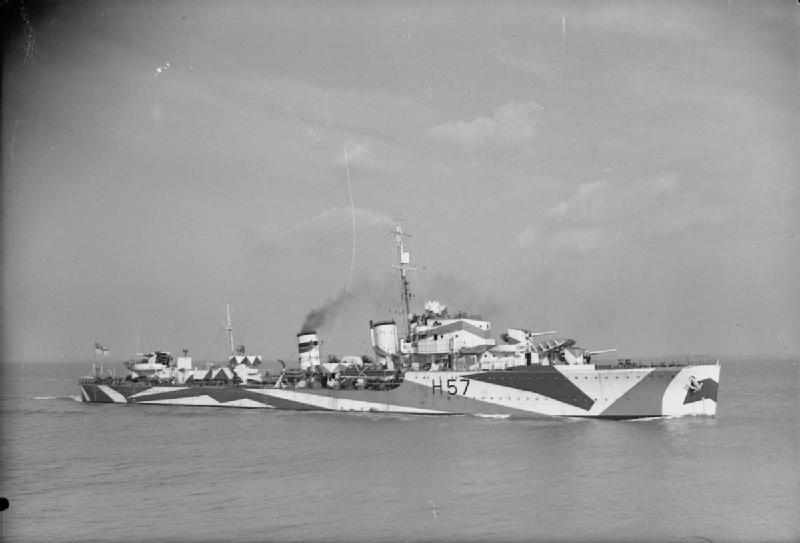
The homogeneous 9th Escort Group of Havant-class destroyers was broken up to provide group leaders for the Mid-Ocean Escort Force.

- Havant-class destroyers: HMS Harvester, Havelock, Hesperus & Highlander

=== 10th Escort Group ===
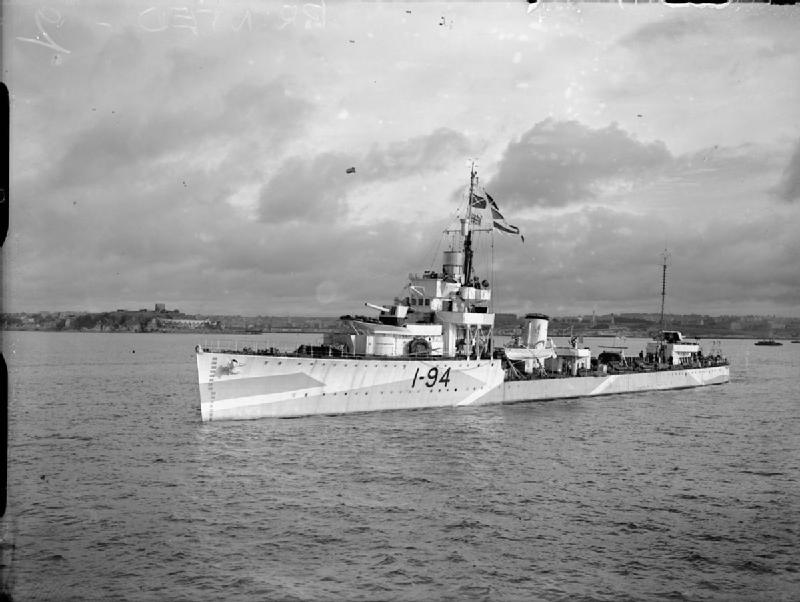
V and W-class destroyers of the homogeneous 10th Escort Group represented the most common class of World War I veteran destroyers in the escort groups.

- V and W-class destroyers: HMS Vanquisher, Witch & Whitehall

=== 11th Escort Group ===
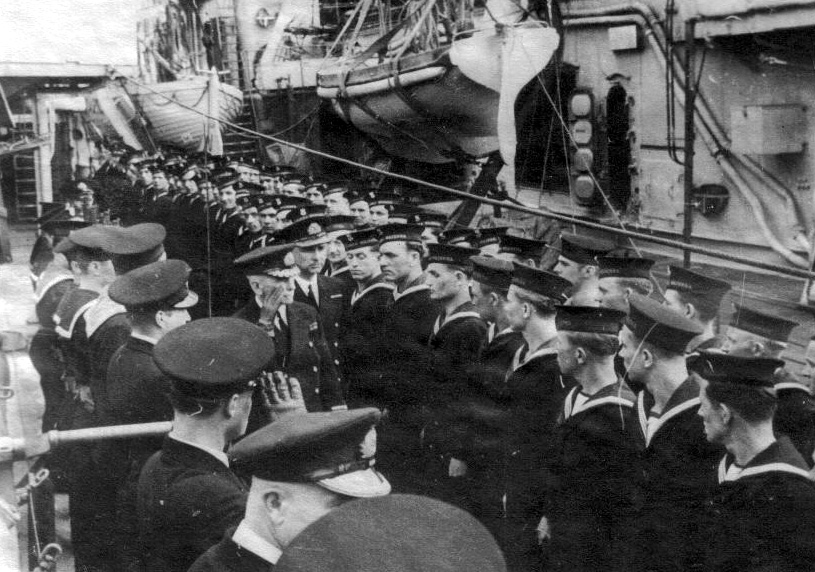
Ships with Polish crews were assigned to the 11th Escort Group.

- G and H-class destroyer: HMS Garland
- N-class destroyer: ORP Piorun

=== 12th Escort Group ===
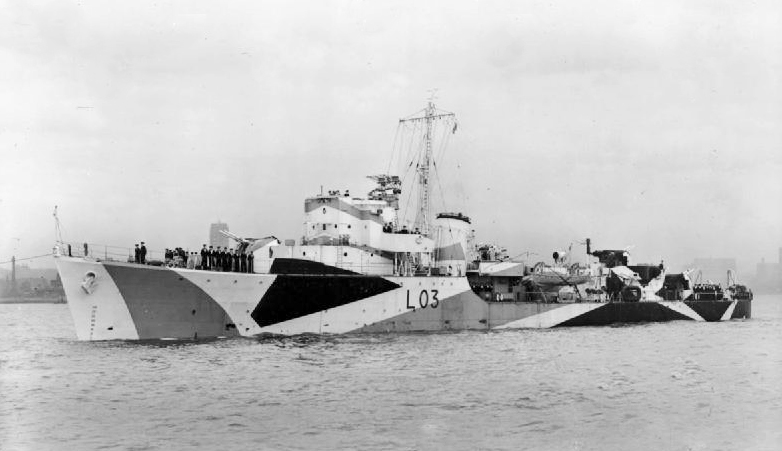
Hunt-class destroyers were assigned to the homogeneous 12th Escort Group.

- Hunt-class destroyers: HMS Badsworth, Blankney, Croome, Exmoor & Lamerton

=== 14th Escort Group ===
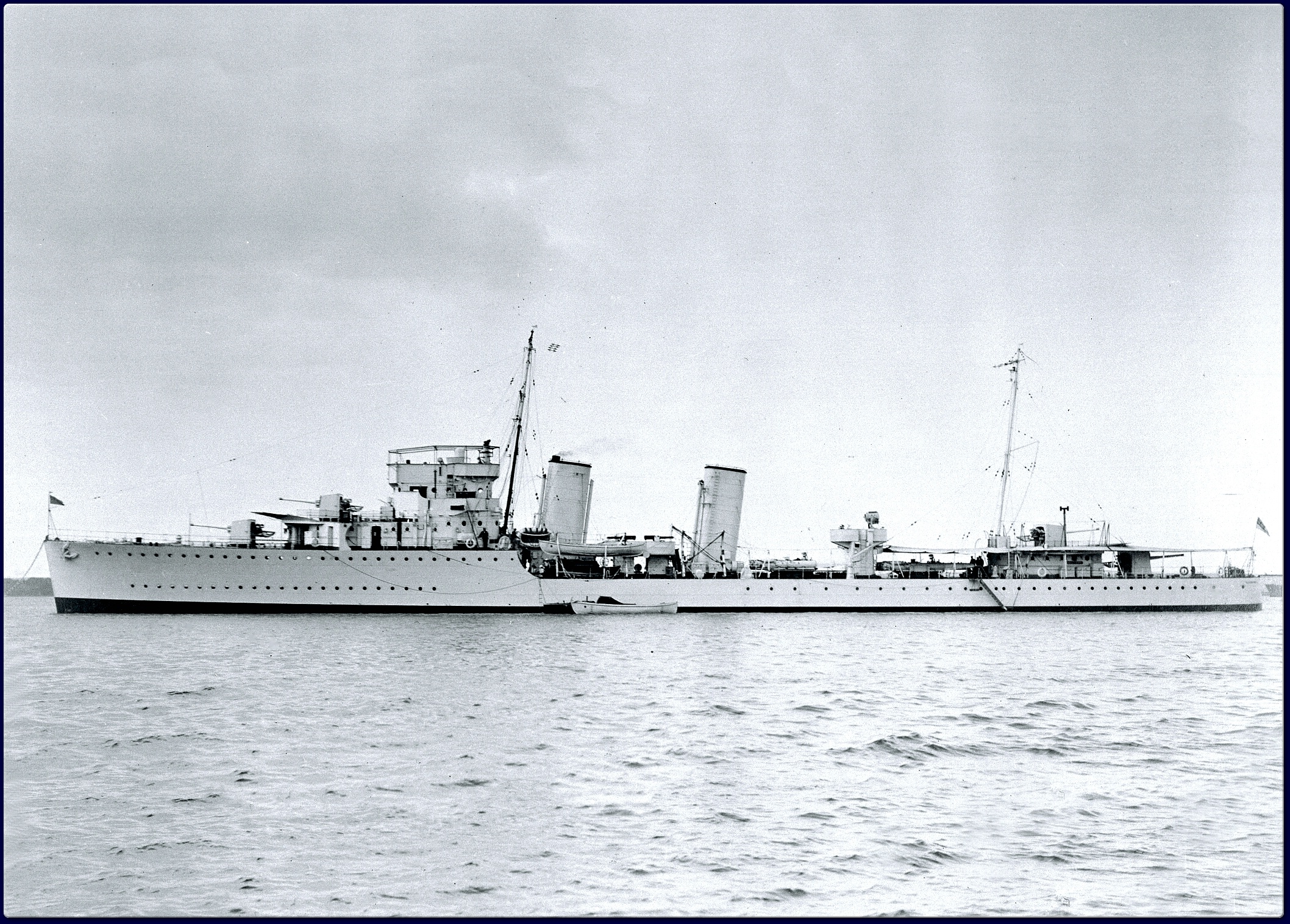
Canadian ships like HMCS Saguenay served with Royal Navy ships in the Canadian 14th through 24th escort groups screening convoys through the western North Atlantic.

- C and D-class destroyers: HMCS Assiniboine & St. Laurent
- Ex-Brazilian destroyers: HMS Harvester & Havelock
- Town-class destroyer: HMS Ripley

=== 15th Escort Group ===
- Canadian River-class destroyer: HMCS Saguenay
- Town-class destroyer: HMS Burwell
- Flower-class corvettes: HMS Dianthus, Honeysuckle & Snowberry

=== 16th Escort Group ===
- Town-class destroyer: HMS Broadwater
- Flower-class corvettes: HMCS Chilliwack, Rimouski & Spikenard

=== 17th Escort Group ===
- Town-class destroyer: HMS Broadway
- Flower-class corvettes: HMS Polyanthus, Cobalt & Trail

=== 18th Escort Group ===
- Town-class destroyer: HMS Churchill
- Flower-class corvettes: HMS Camellia, Arrowhead & Eyebright

=== 19th Escort Group ===
- Town-class destroyer: HMS Burnham
- Flower-class corvettes: HMCS Mayflower, Agassiz & Lévis

=== 20th Escort Group ===
- Town-class destroyer: HMCS Columbia
- Flower-class corvettes: HMS Gladiolus, Mimosa & Wetaskiwin

=== 21st Escort Group ===
- Town-class destroyer: HMCS St. Croix
- Flower-class corvettes: HMCS Chambly, Pictou, Buctouche & Galt

=== 22nd Escort Group ===
- Town-class destroyer: HMS Ramsey
- Flower-class corvettes: HMS Candytuft, Bittersweet & Fennel

=== 23rd Escort Group ===
- Town-class destroyers: HMS Chesterfield & Reading
- Flower-class corvettes: HMCS Hepatica & Prescott

=== 24th Escort Group ===
- Canadian River-class destroyer: HMCS Skeena
- Flower-class corvettes: HMCS Alberni, Orillia & Kenogami

=== 25th Escort Group ===
- Town-class destroyer: HMCS Niagara
- Flower-class corvettes: HMS Alysse, Celandine & Collingwood

=== 36th Escort Group ===
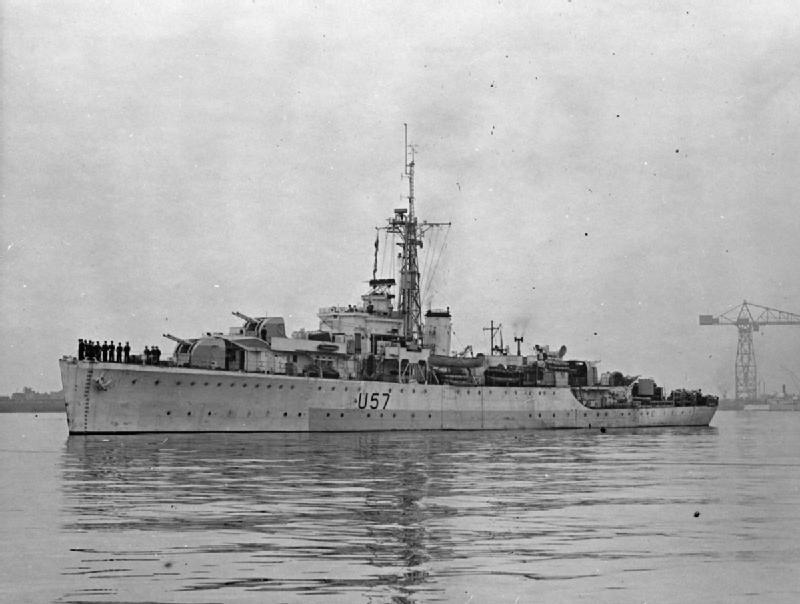
Black Swan-class sloops were among the best of the various classes forming the 36th through 44th escort groups.

- Bittern-class sloop: HMS Stork
- Grimsby-class sloop: HMS Deptford
- Flower-class corvettes: HMS Arbutus, Cowslip, Convolvulus, Marigold, Pentstemon, Rhododendron, Samphire & Vetch

=== 37th Escort Group ===
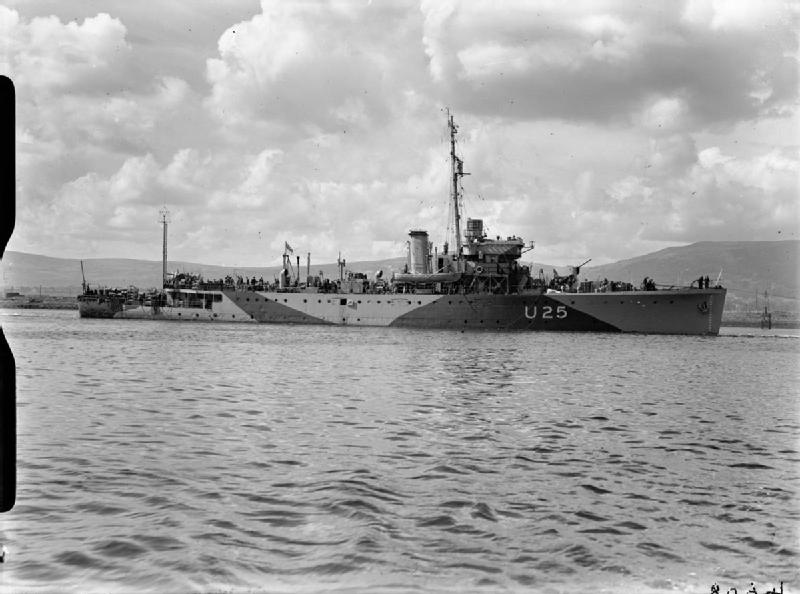
Hastings-class sloops were designed and constructed between the world wars for use as convoy escorts.

- Black Swan-class sloop: HMS Black Swan
- Shoreham-class sloop: HMS Fowey
- Flower-class corvettes: HMS Bluebell, Campion, Carnation, Heliotrope, La Malouine, Mallow, Myosotis & Stonecrop

=== 40th Escort Group ===
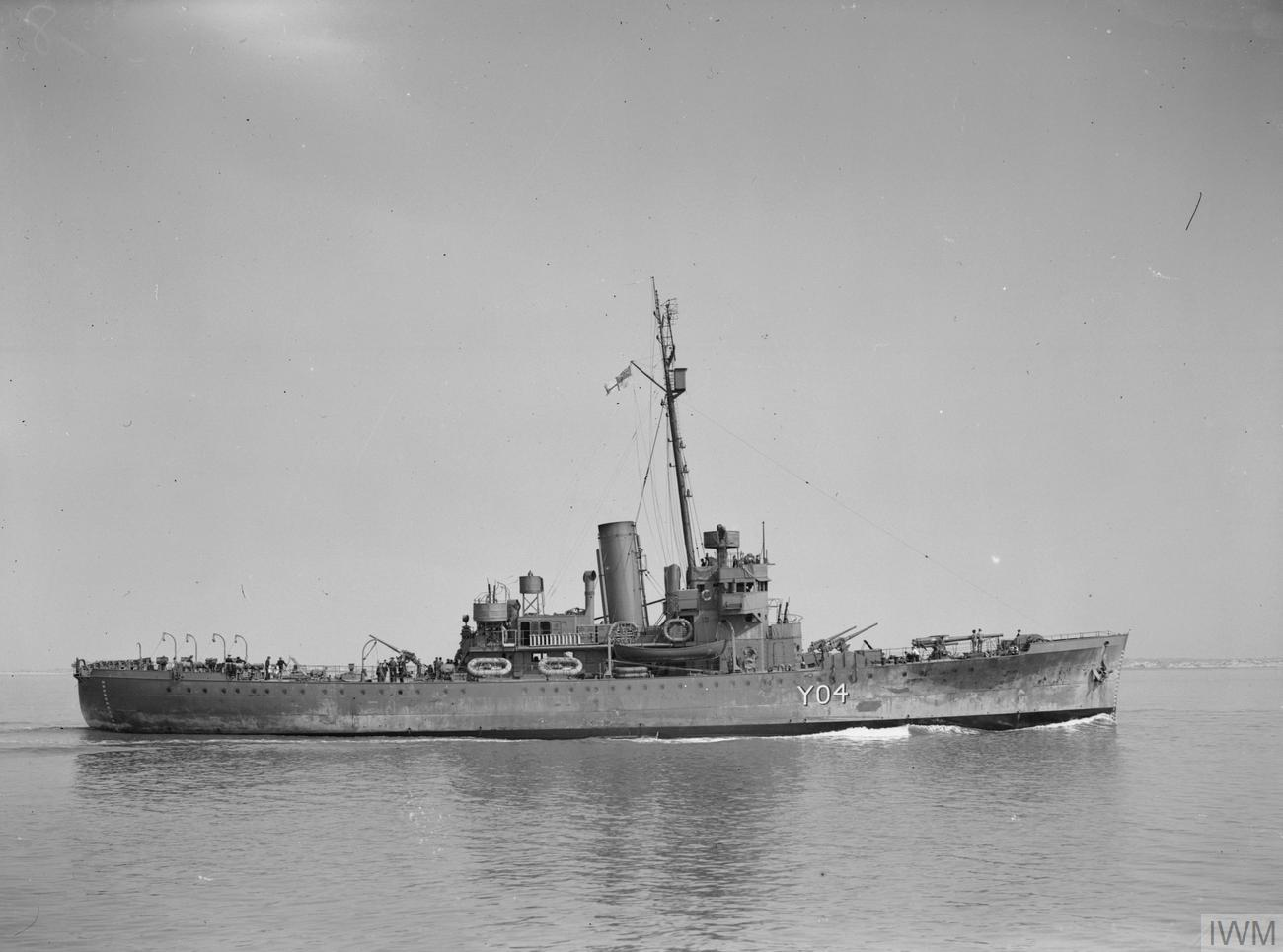
Banff-class sloops were former United States Coast Guard cutters loaned to the Royal Navy in 1941.

- Town-class destroyer: HMS Stanley
- Shoreham-class sloop: HMS Bideford
- Banff-class sloops: HMS Culver, Gorleston, Landguard & Lulworth

=== 41st Escort Group ===
- Town-class destroyer: HMS Clare
- Black Swan-class sloop: HMS Ibis
- Bittern-class sloop: HMS Enchantress
- Grimsby-class sloop: HMS Aberdeen
- Banff-class sloops: HMS Hartland & Walney

=== 42nd Escort Group ===
- Shoreham-class sloop: HMS Weston
- Hastings-class sloop: HMS Folkestone
- Grimsby-class sloops: HMS Londonderry & Wellington
- Banff-class sloops: HMS Sennen & Totland

=== 43rd Escort Group ===
- Town-class destroyer: HMS Newport
- Shoreham-class sloop: HMS Rochester
- Hastings-class sloop: HMS Hastings
- Bridgewater-class sloop: HMS Sandwich
- Grimsby-class sloops: HMS Leith
- Armed yacht: HMS Philante

=== 44th Escort Group ===
- Town-class destroyer: HMS Bradford
- Egret-class sloop: HMS Egret
- Hastings-class sloop: HMS Scarborough
- Grimsby-class sloop: HMS Fleetwood
- Banff-class sloops: HMS Banff & Fishguard

== See also ==
- Mid-Ocean Escort Force
- Escort Group B2
- Escort Group B6
- Escort Group B7
- 5th Escort Group
- 36th Escort Group
- Hunter-killer Group
