= HMS Hastings (L27) =

Sloop of the Royal Navy

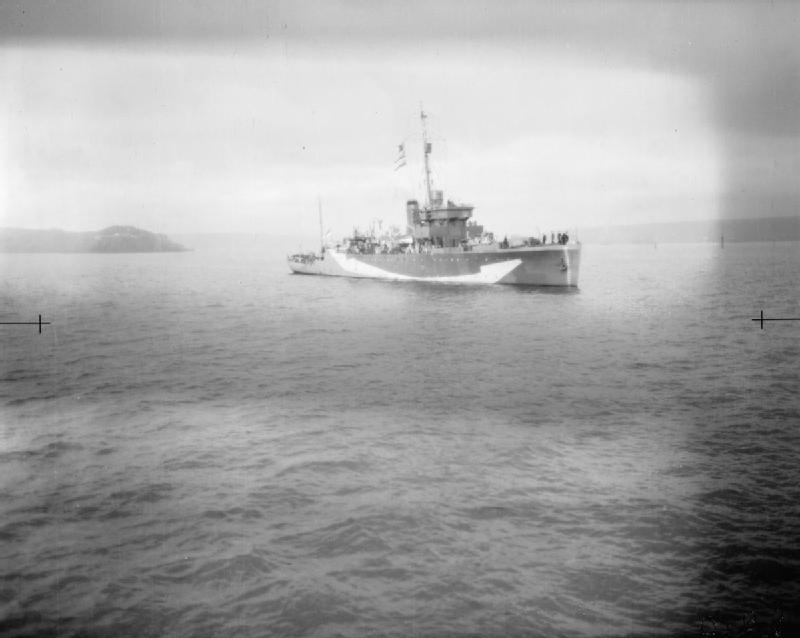
- HMS Hastings in December 1942

History

United Kingdom
- Name: HMS Hastings
- Builder: HM Dockyard Devonport
- Laid down: 29 July 1929
- Launched: 10 April 1930
- Commissioned: 26 November 1930
- Honours and awards: Atlantic (1940–43); Biscay (1943)
- Fate: Sold and broken up April 1946

General characteristics
- Class & type: Hastings-class sloop
- Displacement: 1,045 long tons (1,062 t)
- Length: 250 ft (76 m)
- Beam: 34 ft (10 m)
- Propulsion: Geared turbines, 2 shaft
- Speed: 16 knots (30 km/h; 18 mph)
- Complement: 100
- Armament: 2 × 4 in (100 mm) BL Mk IX guns; 4 × .5" mg guns

HMS Hastings was a Hastings-class sloop of the Royal Navy that saw action in World War II. She was built by HM Dockyard Devonport, laid down on 29 July 1929 and launched on 10 April 1930. She was completed on 26 November 1930 and commissioned that same day by the Honourable Alice Brand. She is the sixth ship to bear the name HMS Hastings. Her pennant number was L27, but changed to U27 in May 1940.

== Pre-war Career ==
Upon completion, she immediately set sail for the Persian Gulf and Red Sea areas where she patrolled until returning to home waters in 1937, when she was deployed with the Fishery Protection Squadron. In a refit as the Second World War was declared in 1939, she was fitted with anti-submarine detection equipment (ASDIC).

== Second World War ==
Hastings was assigned to Rosyth for convoy defence in the North Sea and in waters off the British East Coast from October 1939 until June 1941. During this period, she suffered no damage as a result of enemy action, but was twice involved in collisions with other ships in 1940: HMS Bradman on 11 January and SS Limeslade on 1 December.

In July 1941, she was transferred to Western Approaches Command with the 43rd Escort Group for escort duty between Great Britain and Freetown, Sierra Leone, as well as assisting in Atlantic convoy defence. She was equipped with two Oerlikon 20 mm anti-aircraft cannons for these rôles. By October, she was also equipped with a Type 286M Ex-RAF radar. Hastings transferred to the 44th Escort Group in December and transferred again to the 40th Escort Group in January 1942. In February 1942, the RADAR was upgraded to a Type 271. Hastings transferred to the 42nd Escort Group in July and returned to the 40th Escort Group in February 1943.

In March 1943, she was escorting Convoys HX 229A from St. John's to Great Britain when the convoy came under heavy and sustained attacks from two German U-boat groups totalling 29 attack submarines. Subsequently, she also escorted Convoy ONS 3 and Convoy SC 128 whilst they were being attacked by groups of German attack submarines.

In August of the same year she took part in many anti-submarine operations. The first was on 23 August off Ortegal, Spain. It was led by HMS Bermuda and lasted for two days. On 25 August, a group of frigates and corvettes arrived in the area but were attacked by 14 Dornier Do 217s, seven Junkers Ju 88s and the new German weapon, the Hs 293 glider bomb. The attack was unsuccessful. Two days later, in an operation off Cape Finisterre with RAF Coastal Command led by HMCS Athabaskan, Hastings once again came under glider bomb attack but was undamaged. However, similar glider bombs sunk HMS Egret and severely damaged HMCS Athabaskan, although Athabaskan was saved, the operation was called off. Egret was the first warship sunk by such a glider bomb.

== End of Active Duty ==
After being transferred to the 37th Escort Group in September and the 39th Escort Group in October, Hastings was retired at Belfast on 19 November 1943 after comparison of her age and poor record in the field indicated the advantages of using her crew to man newly constructed warships. She was laid-up briefly at Hartlepool before re-fit as a training target for the 3rd Submarine Squadron in Holy Loch from October 1944 until February 1946. She was paid-off on 16 February and was listed for disposal. She was sold for breaking up in April, and arrived at the breaker's yard at Troon on 10 April 1946 to be broken up by West of Scotland Shipbreakers.
