= Convoy ON 144 =

Convoy during naval battles of the Second World War

- Part of Battle of the Atlantic
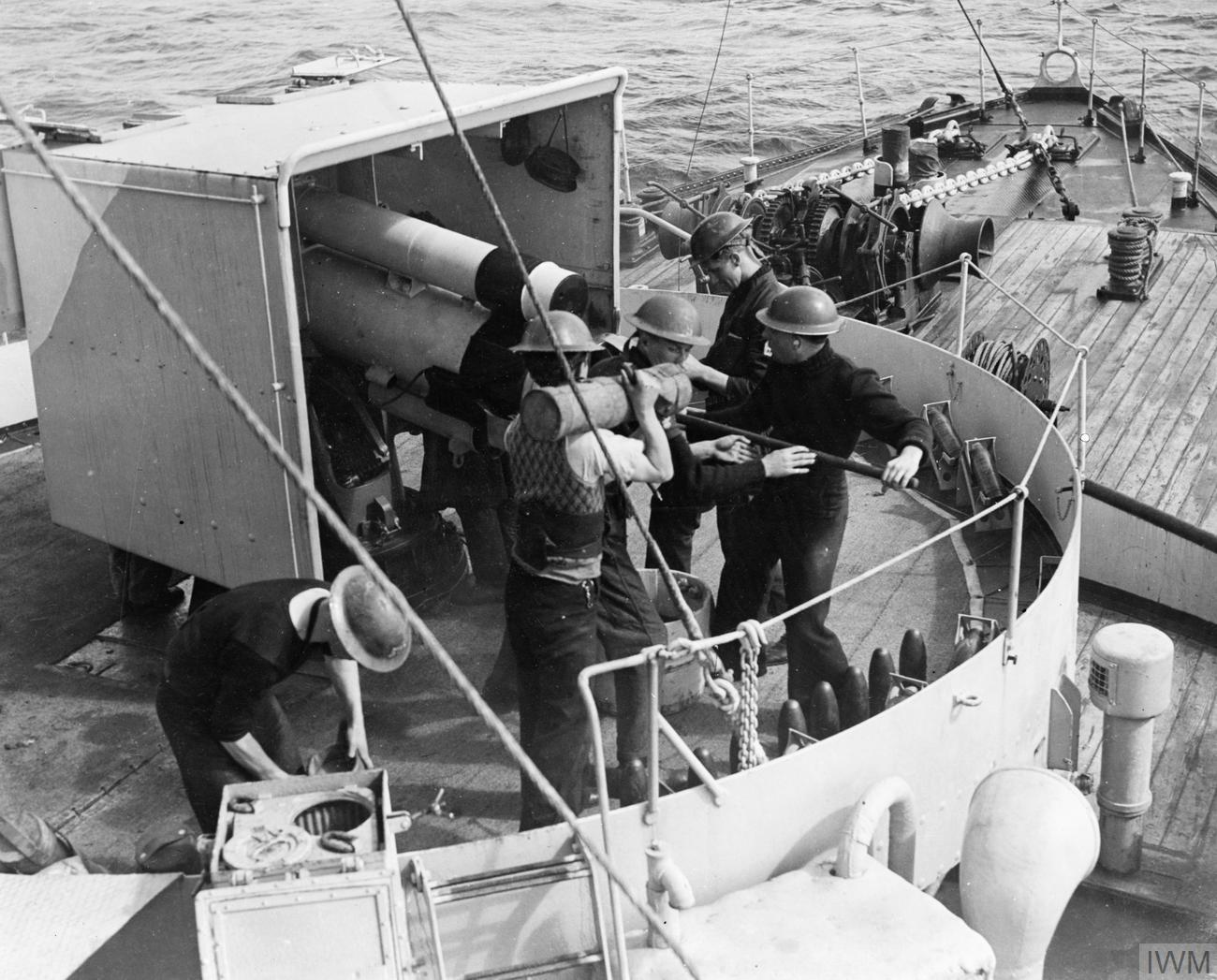
- Bow of the corvette HMS Vervain
Date	15–18 November 1942
Location	North Atlantic
Result	German victory

Belligerents
United Kingdom; Norway; United States	Germany

Commanders and leaders
CAPT J K Brook RNR; LCDR Monssen RNorN	Admiral Karl Dönitz

Strength
33 freighters 5 corvettes	10 submarines

Casualties and losses
5 freighters sunk (25,396 GRT); 86 killed/drowned 1 corvette sunk 47 killed/drowned	1 submarine sunk 50 killed/drowned

Convoy ON 144 was a trade convoy of merchant ships during the Second World War. It was the 144th of the numbered series of ON convoys Outbound from the British Isles to North America. The ships departed Liverpool on 7 November 1942 and were joined on 8 November by Mid-Ocean Escort Force Group B-6 consisting of the Flower-class corvettes Vervain, Potentilla, Eglantine, Montbretia and Rose and the convoy rescue ship Perth. Group B-6 had sailed without the destroyers Fame and Viscount which had been damaged in the battle for eastbound convoy SC 104. The United States Coast Guard cutters Bibb, Duane, and Ingham accompanied the convoy from the Western Approaches with ships that detached for Iceland on 15 November.

== Background ==
As western Atlantic coastal convoys brought an end to the second happy time, Admiral Karl Dönitz, the Befehlshaber der U-Boote (BdU) or commander in chief of U-Boats, shifted focus to the mid-Atlantic to avoid aircraft patrols. Although convoy routing was less predictable in the mid-ocean, Dönitz anticipated that the increased numbers of U-boats being produced would be able to effectively search for convoys with the advantage of intelligence gained through B-Dienst decryption of British Naval Cypher Number 3. However, of the 180 trans-Atlantic convoys sailing from the end of July 1942 until the end of April 1943, only 20 percent lost ships to U-boat attack.

The Norwegian-manned corvettes of escort group B-6 fought three of these convoy battles in sequential voyages with convoys SC 104, ON 144, and HX 217.

== 15 November ==
After rendezvousing with convoys to and from Iceland, Convoy ON 144 was discovered and shadowed by U-521.

== 16 November ==
When initial attempts to summon additional U-boats to the convoy were unsuccessful, U-521 was granted permission to attack, and missed with a salvo of six torpedoes. Rose unsuccessfully counterattacked with depth charges.

== 17 November ==
U-184, U-262 and U-264 found the convoy and launched a simultaneous attack after sunset. U-262 missed with three torpedoes. U-264 sank the 6,696-ton Greek freighter Mount Taurus, and U-184 sank the 3,192-ton British freighter Widestone.

== 18 November ==
U-624, U-522, U-521, U-224, U-383, U-454 and U-753 launched torpedoes in the pre-dawn hours. U-624 sank the 5,344-ton British tanker President Sergent and the 4,732-ton American freighter Parismina and damaged the 5,432-ton American freighter Yaka which was later sunk by U-522. The Type 271 centimeter-wavelength radar-equipped corvettes counterattacked, and U-184 was sunk by one of those attacks. Montbretia was torpedoed by U-262 and sank while still moving forward.

== 19 November ==
The U-boats had broken off the engagement by the time the four surviving corvettes were reinforced by the destroyers HMS Firedrake and USS Badger, and the Western Local Escort Force assumed responsibility for the convoy on 20 November.

== Ships in convoy ==
Name	Flag	Dead	Tonnage (GRT)	Cargo	Notes
Agia Marina (1912)	Greece		4,151		Destination Halifax
Baxtergate (1925)	United Kingdom		5,531		Destination New York City
Bestik (1920)	Norway		2,684		Destination New York City
Borgfred (1925)	Norway		2,183	Coal	Destination Halifax
Cetus (1920)	Norway		2,614		Destination New York City
Dimitros Inglessis (1918)	Greece		5,275		Destination St John, New Brunswick
Empire Stour (1930)	United Kingdom		4,696	Ferro manganese	Destination Sydney, Nova Scotia
Fjallfoss (1919)	Iceland		1,451		Joined from Iceland on 15 November
Godafoss (1921)	Iceland		1,542		Joined from Iceland on 15 November
Governor John Lind (1918)	United States		3,431		Joined from Iceland on 15 November; Destination Halifax
Guido (1920)	United Kingdom		3,921	General cargo	Destination New York City
Ingertre (1921)	Norway		2,462		Destination Halifax
Leonidas N. Condylis (1912)	Greece		3,923		Destination Halifax
Maycrest (1913)	United Kingdom		5,923		Destination New York City; ship's master was convoy vice-commodore
Minister Wedel (1930)	Norway		6,833		Destination New York City
Monkleigh (1927)	United Kingdom		5,203		Destination New York City
Moscha D. Kydoniefs (1915)	Greece		3,874		Destination Halifax
Mount Taurus (1920)	Greece	2	6,696	In Ballast	Sunk by U-624
Nordeflinge (1942)	United Kingdom		2,873		Destination New York City
Norlom (1919)	Norway		6,412		Destination Halifax
Orwell (1905)	Norway		7,920		Destination New York City
Parismina (1908)	United States	22	4,732	In Ballast	Joined from Iceland on 15 November; sunk by U-624 on 18 November
Perth (1915)	United Kingdom		2,259		Convoy rescue ship
President Sergent (1923)	United Kingdom	20	5,344	In Ballast	Carried convoy commodore Capt J K Brook RNR. Sunk by U-624 on 18 November
Reigh Count (1907)	Panama		4,657		Destination New York City
Robert E. Hopkins (1921)	United States		6,625		Destination New York City
Selfoss (1914)	Iceland		775		Joined from Iceland on 15 November
Suderøy (1913)	Norway		7,562		Destination New York City
Tahchee (1914)	United Kingdom		6,508		Destination New York City
Titanian (1924)	Norway		4,880	Coal	Destination Saint John, New Brunswick
Van de Velde (1919)	Netherlands		6,389	Coal	Destination Boston
Widestone (1920)	United Kingdom	42	3,192	3,400 tons coal	Sunk by U-184
Yaka (1920)	United States	0	5,432	In Ballast	Joined from Iceland on 15 November; sunk by U-522
Yemassee (1922)	Panama		2,001		Joined from Iceland on 15 November; Destination New York City

== See also ==
- Convoy Battles of World War II
