= SS Esso Appalachee =

1942 Oil Tanker

History
- Name: Empire Dickens (1942–46); Esso Appalachee (1946–60)
- Owner: Ministry of War Transport (1942–45); Ministry of Transport (1945–46); Anglo-American Oil Co. Ltd (1946–51); Esso Petroleum Co Ltd (1951–60)
- Operator: Davies & Newman Ltd (1942–46); Esso Transportation Co (1946–51); Esso Petroleum Co Ltd (1951–60)
- Port of registry: Middlesbrough, United Kingdom
- Builder: Furness Shipbuilding Co Ltd
- Yard number: 341
- Laid down: 21 April 1941
- Launched: 14 February 1942
- Completed: April 1942
- Maiden voyage: 14 April 1942
- Identification: United Kingdom Official Number 164853; Code Letters BDSG
- Fate: Scrapped

General characteristics
- Class & type: Tanker
- Tonnage: 9,819 GRT; 5,790 NRT; 14,852 DWT
- Length: 483 ft 8 in (147.42 m)
- Beam: 68 ft 3 in (20.80 m)
- Propulsion: Triple expansion steam engine
- Speed: 10.5 knots (19.4 km/h)
- Capacity: 708,554 cubic feet (20,064 m^{3})

Esso Appalachee was a 9,819 GRT tanker that was built in 1942 as Empire Dickens by Furness Shipbuilding Co Ltd, Haverton Hill-on-Tees, County Durham, United Kingdom for the Ministry of War Transport (MoWT). In 1946, she was sold into merchant service and renamed Esso Appalachee, serving until 1960, when she was scrapped.

== Description ==
The ship was built in 1941 by Furness Shipbuilding Co Ltd, Haverton Hill-on-Tees. She was yard number 341.

The ship was 483 feet 8 inches (147.42 m) long, with a beam of 68 feet 3 inches (20.80 m). She had a depth of 36 feet 1 inch (11.00 m) and a draught of 28 feet 3 inches (8.61 m). She was assessed at 9,819 GRT, 5,790 NRT. Her DWT was 14,852. She had capacity for 708,554 cubic feet (20,064 m^{3}) of liquid cargo.

The ship was propelled by a 674 nhp triple expansion steam engine, which had cylinders of 27 inches (69 cm), 44 inches (110 cm) and 76 inches (190 cm) diameter by 51 inches (130 cm) stroke. The engine was built by Richardson Westgarth & Co Ltd, West Hartlepool. It drove a screw propeller and could propel the ship at 10.5 knots (19.4 km/h).

== History ==
Empire Dickens was built for the MoWT. Her keel was laid on 21 April 1941, She was launched on 14 February 1942 and completed in April. The Official Number 164853 and Code Letters BDSG were allocated.

=== World War II ===
==== 1942 ====
Empire Dickens departed from Middlesbrough on her maiden voyage on 14 April 1942. She joined Convoy FN 681, which had departed from Southend, Essex the previous day and arrived at Methil, Fife on 15 April 1942. She then joined Convoy EN 72, which departed two days later and arrived at Oban, Argyllshire on 19 April. From Oban, Empire Dickens joined Convoy ON 89, which had departed from Liverpool, Lancashire on 23 April and arrived at New York, United States on 5 May. From New York, she sailed to the Hampton Roads, Virginia, departing on 17 May as a member of Convoy KS 501, which arrived at Key West, Florida on 23 May. She then sailed to Pensacola, Florida, arriving two days later. Empire Dickens sailed from Pensacola on 27 May for Port Arthur, Texas, arriving the next day. She departed on 31 May for Key West, arriving there on 5 June. Empire Dickens was a member of Convoy KN 108, which departed from Key West on 8 June 1942 and arrived at New York on 15 June. She left the convoy at the Hampton Roads on 16 June, departing for New York on 21 June and arriving there the next day. She then sailed to Boston, Massachusetts, from where she departed on 27 June for Halifax, Nova Scotia, Canada, arriving two days later. Empire Dickens was a member of Convoy HX 197, which departed from Halifax on 6 July and arrived at Liverpool on 17 July. She was carrying a cargo of petrol. She left the convoy at the Belfast Lough to join Convoy BB 199, which arrived at Milford Haven, Pembrokeshire on 18 July. Her destination was Swansea, Glamorgan, where she arrived the next day.

Empire Dickens departed from Swansea on 26 August for Milford Haven, from where she sailed on 27 August to join Convoy ON 125, which departed from Liverpool on 28 August and arrived at New York on 12 September. She departed from New York on 20 September as a member of Convoy NG 307, which arrived at Guantanamo Bay, Cuba on 27 September. She then joined Convoy GAT 9, which departed that day and arrived at Trinidad on 3 October. Empire Dickens left the convoy at Curaçao, Netherlands Antilles, where she arrived on 30 September. She departed on 5 October, joining Convoy TAG 10, which had departed from Trinidad on 3 October and arrived at Guantanamo Bay on 8 October. She departed on 10 October as a member of Convoy GN 11, which arrived at New York on 16 October. Empire Dickens was a member of Convoy HX 212, which departed from New York on 18 October and arrived at Liverpool on 2 November. She was carrying petrol and bound for Avonmouth, Somerset, which was reached by detaching from the convoy at the Belfast Lough on 1 November to join Convoy BB 232. That convoy departed on 2 November and arrived at Milford Haven the next day. Avonmouth was reached on 5 November.

Empire Dickens departed from Avonmouth on 22 November for Milford Haven, arriving the next day and departing the day after to join Convoy ON 149, which departed from Liverpool on 26 November and arrived at New York on 12 December. She then joined Convoy NK 514, which departed on 16 December and arrived at Key West on 21 December. She departed that day for Houston, Texas, arriving on 26 December.

==== 1943 ====
A return trip was made to Baytown before Empire Dickens departed on 1 January 1943 for New York, which was reached on 9 January via Key West and Jacksonville, Florida. She departed on 14 January as a member of Convoy HX 223, which arrived at Liverpool on 2 February. She left the convoy at the Belfast Lough on 1 February.

Empire Dickens departed from Liverpool on 21 February as a member of Convoy ON 168, which dispersed off Cape Cod, Massachusetts on 12 March. her destination was New York, which was reached on 17 March. Having loaded a cargo of petrol, she departed from New York on 25 March as a member of Convoy HX 231, which arrived at Liverpool on 10 April. She left the convoy at the Belfast Lough on 10 April to join Convoy BB 278, which arrived at Milford Haven the next day. Her destination was Swansea, which was reached via Avonmouth on 16 April.

Empire Dickens departed from Swansea on 22 April for Milford Haven, from where she departed the next day to join Convoy ON 180, which departed from Liverpool on 24 April and arrived at New York on 14 May. She detached from the convoy and put into the Belfast Lough with defects, arriving on 26 April and departing four days later to join Convoy ON 181, which departed from Liverpool that day and arrived at New York on 18 May. Her destination was Philadelphia, Pennsylvania, where she arrived that day. Empire Dickens sailed for New York on 29 May, arriving that day and departing two days later as a member of Convoy HX 242, which arrived at Liverpool on 15 June. She was carrying a cargo of petrol bound for the Stanlow Refinery, Ellesmere Port, Cheshire. Empire Dickens made another return trip to New York, departing on 24 June as a member of Convoy ON 190, which arrived on 8 July. She returned with Convoy HX 248, which departed on 15 July and arrived at Liverpool on 29 July.

Empire Dickens departed from Liverpool on 31 July as a member of Convoy ON 195, which arrived at New York on 13 August. She returned with defects, arriving back at Liverpool the next day. Defects rectified, she joined Convoy ON 196, which departed on 8 August and arrived at New York on 21 August. She was a member of Convoy HX 252, which departed from New York on 2 September and arrived at Liverpool on 16 September. She was carrying a cargo of avgas which was destined for Thameshaven, Essex. Empire Dickens left the convoy at Loch Ewe on 15 September and reached Southend on 20 September via Convoy WN 480 to Methil and Convoy FS 1224.

Empire Dickens departed from Southend on 13 October as a member of Convoy FN 1151, which arrived at Methil two days later. She then joined Convoy EN 295, which departed on 16 October and arrived at Loch Ewe on 18 October. She then joined Convoy ON 207, which had departed from Liverpool on 18 October and arrived at New York on 4 November. She departed from New York on 11 November for the Hampton Roads, arriving the next day. Empire Dickens was a member of Convoy UGS 24, which departed on 14 November and arrived at Port Said, Egypt on 12 December. Her destination was Bizerta, Algeria, which was reached on 6 December. She sailed on 13 December to join Convoy GUS 24, which had departed from Port Said on 6 December 1943, and arrived at the Hampton Roads on 3 January 1944. Her destination was New York, which was reached that day.

==== 1944 ====
Empire Dickens departed from New York for the Hampton Roads on 23 January. She then joined Convoy UGS 31, which departed on 25 January and arrived at Port Said on 21 February. Her destination was Algiers, Algeria, which was reached on 13 February. She departed on 19 February to join Convoy KMS 41, which had departed from Gibraltar on 17 February and arrived at Port Said on 27 February. She left the convoy at Augusta, Sicily, Italy on 23 February. She sailed two days later for Bari, arriving on 27 February. She departed on 6 March for Taranto, arriving the next day and leaving later that day to join Convoy HA 28A, which had departed from Bari on 7 March and arrived at Augusta on 9 March. She departed the next day to join Convoy GUS 33, which had departed from Port Said on 5 March and arrived at the Hampton Roads on 4 April.

Empire Dickens departed from New York on 30 April for the Hampton Roads in order to join Convoy UGS 41, which departed on 3 May and arrived at Port Said on 30 May. Her destination was Casablanca, Morocco, which was reached on 20 May. She departed for Gibraltar three days later, arriving on 25 May. Empire Dickens was a member of Convoy KMS 52, which departed on 6 June and arrived at Port Said on 16 June. She left the convoy at Augusta, arriving on 12 June. A return trip to Naples was made via Convoy VN 46 and Convoy NV 47, arriving back at Augusta on 22 June. She departed the next day to join Convoy MKS 53, which had departed from Port Said on 18 June and arrived at Gibraltar on 29 June. She left the convoy at Algiers, where she arrived on 27 June. Empire Dickens departed on 2 July to join Convoy GUS 44, which had departed from Port Said on 24 June and arrived at the Hampton Roads on 18 July. Her destination was New York, which was reached that day.

Empire Dickens departed from New York on 1 August 1944 for the Hampton Roads, arriving on 3 August. She then joined Convoy UGS 50, which departed that day and arrived at Port Said on 29 August. Her destination was Augusta, which was reached on 25 August. She sailed that day for Bari, arriving two days later and departing on 1 September 1944 for Brindisi, arriving the next day. She departed on 5 September to join Convoy HA 64A, which had departed from Bari that day and arrived at Augusta on 7 September. Empire Dickens arrived at Augusta on 6 September and joined Convoy GUS 51, which had departed from Port Said on 2 September and arrived at the Hampton Roads on 28 September. She arrived at New York that day.

Empire Dickens was a member of Convoy HX 314, which departed from New York on 15 October 1944 and arrived at Liverpool on 29 October. She was carrying a cargo of avgas bound for Thameshaven. She arrived at Southend on 30 October. Empire Dickens was a member of Convoy ON 270, which departed from Southend on 3 December and arrived at New York on 22 December.

==== 1945 ====
She returned to the United Kingdom with Convoy HX 331, which departed on 8 January 1945 and arrived at Liverpool on 22 January. She was carrying a cargo of petrol, which was bound for Avonmouth, where she arrived on 22 January.

Empire Dickens departed from Avonmouth on 31 January for Milford Haven, from where she sailed on 2 February to join Convoy ON 282, which had departed from Liverpool the previous day and arrived at New York on 19 February. She returned with Convoy HX 342, which departed on 4 March and arrived at Liverpool on 19 March. She was carrying a cargo of aircraft and petrol. She detached from the convoy and sailed to the Clyde, arriving on 20 March. Empire Dickens departed from the Clyde on 27 March to join Convoy ON 293, which had departed from Southend that day and arrived at New York on 15 April. Carrying a cargo of petrol, she returned with Convoy HX 354, which departed on 3 May and arrived at Liverpool on 18 May. She left the convoy at the Belfast Lough that day.

=== Post-war ===
Empire Dickens departed from the Belfast Lough on 22 May to join Convoy ON 304, which had departed from Southend on 21 May and arrived at New York on 5 June. She departed three days later for London. She departed from London on 21 June for Aruba, Netherlands Antilles, from where she departed on 17 July for Cristóbal, Panama Canal Zone. She sailed from Cristóbal on 23 July for Aruba, arriving three days later. She departed from Aruba on 28 July for Gibraltar, from where she departed on 12 August for Naples, arriving on 16 August.

Empire Dickens departed from Naples on 19 August for Port Said, where she arrived four days later. She then sailed to Suez, from where she departed on 24 August for Abadan, Iran, arriving on 4 September and departing three days later for Melbourne, Australia, where she arrived on 6 October. She departed on 10 October for Abadan, arriving on 5 November. Empire Dickens departed on 8 November for Suez, arriving on 19 November and then sailing to Port Said, from where she departed on 21 November for Augusta, which was reached on 24 November. She sailed four days later for Livorno via Genoa, arriving on 3 December. Empire Dickens departed from Livorno on 6 December for Port Said, arriving on 11 December and then sailing to Suez, from where she departed on 12 December for Abadan, which was reached on 23 December.

=== Re-named Esso Appalachee ===
In 1946, Empire Dickens was sold to the Anglo-American Oil Co Ltd, London. She was renamed Esso Appalachee and placed under the management of the Esso Transportation Co Ltd. In 1951, she was sold to Esso Petroleum Co Ltd, London. In April 1952, Esso Appalachee was being towed by the tugs Flying Buzzard and Flying Petrel at Bowling, West Dunbartonshire when she fouled her tow and then collided with Flying Buzzard, hitting her amidships and sinking her. Flying Buzzard was salvaged in May and repaired, returning to service in October. On 6 January 1956, Esso Appalachee was in collision with the jetty at Immingham, Lincolnshire, cutting it in two and leaving a 50-foot (15 m) gap. She served until 1960, arriving on 2 August at Faslane, Argyllshire for scrapping by Shipbuilding Industries Ltd.
