= Escort Group B6 =

- Active: World War II
- Country: United Kingdom
- Allegiance: British Empire
- Branch: Royal Navy
- Type: Escort Group
- Role: Anti-submarine warfare
- Size: ~7 ships
- Part of: Western Approaches Command
- Engagements: Convoy SC 104; Convoy ON 206

Commanders
- Notable commanders: Cdr JJ Waterhouse; Cdr R Heathcote; Cdr RA Currie

Escort Group B6 was a British convoy escort group of the Royal Navy which saw action during the Second World War, principally in the Battle of the Atlantic.

== Formation ==
Escort Group B6 was one of seven British escort groups which served with the Mid-Ocean Escort Force (MOEF), which provided convoy protection in the most dangerous midsection of the North Atlantic route. The MOEF was originally to be 5 American, 5 British and 4 Canadian groups. B6 was formed in the spring of 1942, following the inability of the US Navy to form groups A4 and A5 due to other commitments. To replace them two new escort groups, B6 and B7 were formed.

== Service history ==
Led by Modified long-range V-class destroyer HMS Viscount (D92), and under the leadership of Commander John Waterhouse, Group B6 included four Norwegian-manned Flower-class corvettes from Group A4; HNoMS Andenes (K01), HNoMS Eglantine (K197), HNoMS Potentilla (K214), and HNoMS Rose (K102). These were joined later by a fifth, HNoMS Montbretia (K208).

In the summer of 1942 B6 escorted several uneventful convoys which arrived without loss. However, in August 1942 ON 122 was attacked by 9 U-boats of wolfpack Lohs. four ships were sunk, while six U-boats were damaged, four seriously enough to return to base. Two of these returning submarines were attacked by aircraft in the Bay of Biscay; one was sunk, another so badly damaged it had to be withdrawn from service.

In September B6 was joined by the F-class destroyer Fame as senior ship, whose commander Ralph Heathcote became Senior Officer of the Escort group (SOE). The following month SC 104 was attacked by Group Wotan. In a five-day battle (12–17 October) SC 104 lost eight ships while two U-boats (U-661 and U-353) were destroyed and two others damaged. During this action both Fame and Viscount were damaged and forced to withdraw, command falling to Lieutenant Commander Christian Monsen of Potentilla.

In November a depleted B6 group, still under Monsen, was escorting ON 144 which was attacked by 16 U-boats of Group Kreuzotter. In a fierce battle, five ships of the convoy, and the corvette Montbretia, were sunk. One U-boat was destroyed (U-184, sunk by Potentilla). Monsen and the group were later commended for their aggressive defence, which was widely held to have averted a major disaster.

In December HX 217 was attacked by seven U-boats of group Panzer. B6, again led by Fame, and with the three Norwegian ships was now joined by the Polish destroyer ORP Burza, and a British corvette. Another aggressive defence kept losses to a minimum, even when Panzer was joined by a second wolf pack, Draufgang. Two ships were sunk in the three-day battle, while one U-boat was sunk by aircraft, and several others damaged. Another U-boat was lost, and one damaged, in a mid-ocean collision

In January 1943 B6 was joined by the corvettes HMS Kingcup and Vervain, bringing its strength up to seven warships. In February 1943 while escorting ON 165, the convoy was attacked by U-boats of Group Hardegen. Two U-boats were destroyed – U-69 sunk by Fame and U-201 by Viscount – for the loss of two ships. In late February and early March HX 227 was intercepted by group Neptun, but an aggressive defence and foul weather frustrated any co-ordinated attacks. Two stragglers were lost, while two U-boats were forced to return with damage.

Following the major convoy battles of May 1943, which left B6 and their charges unscathed, the Battle of the Atlantic fell into a lull as the U-boat Arm withdrew from the battle. Several uneventful convoys followed, until the renewal of the offensive in the autumn of 1943. In this period B6 was involved in one convoy battle, while escorting ON 206. This convoy, and ONS 20, both became embroiled in the last major convoy action of the campaign, which saw six U-boats destroyed, for one ships lost. None of these were accounted to ships of B6 however.

Following this action the North Atlantic route was again quiet, with B6 continuing escort duties, until in the spring of 1944 it was disbanded in a general re-organization prior to the invasion of Normandy. In its 23-month career B6 escorted 31 convoys, losing 19 ships, but seeing over 900 safely to harbour. The group lost one of its number, the corvette Montbretia, but was credited with the destruction of five U-boats.

== Tables ==
=== Ships lost ===
- HNoMS Montbretia (K208), torpedoed and sunk 18 November 1942 by U-262

=== U-boats destroyed ===
- U-661 rammed by Viscount on 15 October 1942
- U-353 rammed by Fame on 16 October 1942
- U-184 depth-charged by Potentilla on 20 November 1942
- U-69 rammed by Viscount on 17 February 1943
- U-201 depth-charged by Fame on 17 February 1943

=== Convoys escorted ===
Homebound	Outbound
SC 83	ON 101
SC 88	ON 111
HX 200	ON 122
HX 205	ON 132
SC 104	ON 144
HX 217	ON 155
SC 116	ON 165
HX 227	ONS 1
SC 125	ONS 6
HX 251	ONS 17
HX 257	ON 206
SC 145	ON 212
SC 148	ON 218
SC 151	ONS 29
HX 281	ON 229
HX 286	

=== Senior Officer Escort ===
From	To	Captain
April 1942	September 1942	Cdr. J Waterhouse
September 1942	July 1943	Cdr. R Heathcote
July 1943	April 1944	Cdr. R Currie
