= HMCS Ville de Québec (K242) =

Flower-class corvette

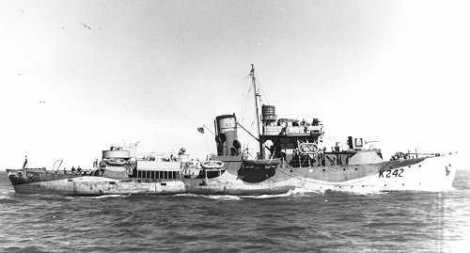
- HMCS Ville de Québec

History

Canada
- Name: Ville de Québec
- Namesake: Quebec City, Quebec
- Builder: Morton Engineering and Dry Dock Co., Quebec City
- Laid down: 7 June 1941
- Launched: 12 November 1941
- Commissioned: 24 May 1942
- Decommissioned: 6 July 1945
- Identification: Pennant number: K242
- Honours and awards: Atlantic 1942–1944, Mediterranean 1943, English Channel 1944–1945; Gulf of St. Lawrence
- Fate: Sold for mercantile use 1946

General characteristics
- Class & type: Flower-class corvette (Revised)
- Displacement: 925 long tons (940 t; 1,036 short tons)
- Length: 205 ft (62.48 m)o/a
- Beam: 33 ft (10.06 m)
- Draught: 11.5 ft (3.51 m)
- Propulsion: single shaft; 2 × water tube boilers; 1 × double acting triple-expansion reciprocating steam engine; 2,750 ihp (2,050 kW)
- Speed: 16 knots (29.6 km/h)
- Range: 3,500 nautical miles (6,482 km) at 12 knots (22.2 km/h)
- Complement: 85
- Sensors & processing systems: 1 × SW1C or 2C radar; 1 × Type 123A or Type 127DV sonar
- Armament: 1 × BL 4-inch (101.6 mm) Mk.IX gun; 2 × .50 cal machine gun (twin); 2 × Lewis .303 cal machine gun (twin); 2 × Mk.II depth charge throwers; 2 × depth charge rails with 40 depth charges

HMCS Ville de Québec was a Royal Canadian Navy revised Flower-class corvette which took part in convoy escort duties during the Second World War. She fought primarily in the Battle of the Atlantic. She was named for Quebec City, Quebec. Following the war, the ship was sold to commercial interests, in service until 1952.

== Background ==
Flower-class corvettes like Ville de Québec serving with the Royal Canadian Navy during the Second World War were different from earlier and more traditional sail-driven corvettes. The "corvette" designation was created by the French as a class of small warships; the Royal Navy borrowed the term for a period but discontinued its use in 1877. During the hurried preparations for war in the late 1930s, Winston Churchill reactivated the corvette class, needing a name for smaller ships used in an escort capacity, in this case based on a whaling ship design. The generic name "flower" was used to designate the class of these ships, which – in the Royal Navy – were named after flowering plants.

Corvettes commissioned by the Royal Canadian Navy during the Second World War were named after communities for the most part, to better represent the people who took part in building them. This idea was put forth by Admiral Percy W. Nelles. Sponsors were commonly associated with the community for which the ship was named. Royal Navy corvettes were designed as open sea escorts, while Canadian corvettes were developed for coastal auxiliary roles which was exemplified by their minesweeping gear. Eventually the Canadian corvettes would be modified to allow them to perform better on the open seas.

== Construction ==
Ville de Québec was ordered as part of the Revised 1940–41 Flower-class building program. This revised program radically changed the look of the Flower-class corvette. The ships of this program kept the water-tube boilers of the initial 1940–41 program, but now they were housed in separate compartments for safety. The fo'c'sle was extended, which allowed more space for berths for the crew, leading to an expansion of the crew. The bow had increased flare for better control in heavy seas. The revised Flowers of the RCN received an additional two depth charge throwers fitted amidships and more depth charges. They also came with heavier secondary armament with 20 mm anti-aircraft guns carried on the extended bridge wings. All this led to an increase in displacement, draught and length.

Ville de Québec was laid down by Morton Engineering and Dry Dock Co. at Quebec City on 7 June 1941 and launched 12 November 1941. She was commissioned 24 May 1942 at Quebec. During her career, she had one significant refit. This took place at Thompson Brothers in Liverpool, Nova Scotia from mid-January until early May 1944.

== Service history ==
Ville de Québec arrived at Halifax 12 June 1942. After workups she was assigned to the Western Local Escort Force (WLEF) in late July 1942. During this period with WLEF she was used almost exclusively on Boston – Halifax convoys.

In September 1942, Ville de Québec was allocated for Operation Torch, the Allied invasion of North Africa. On 28 October 1942, while crossing to the United Kingdom she and HMCS Alberni picked up 81 survivors from the British whale factory ship Sourabaya that was torpedoed and sunk the previous day in the North Atlantic. She arrived at Derry on 10 November and spent the next four months escorting convoys between the United Kingdom and Gibraltar. While on escort duty she sank the U-224 in the western Mediterranean Sea west of Algiers by ramming and depth charges.

Ville de Québec returned to Canada in April 1943 and joined Quebec Force on 12 May, escorting convoys between Quebec and Sydney. In late September she rejoined WLEF as part of escort group W-2. She remained with them until mid January 1944 when she departed for refit.

After working up in Bermuda Ville de Québec joined the Mid-Ocean Escort Force as a trans-Atlantic convoy escort. She joined group C-4 in July and remained with them until transferring to the Royal Navy controlled escort group EG 41 under Plymouth Command. She escorted convoys from Milford Haven until the end of the war.

Ville de Québec was paid off 6 July 1945 at Sorel, Quebec. She was transferred to the War Assets Corporation and sold for mercantile use in 1946. She reappeared in 1946 as Dispina and renamed Doreathea Paxos in 1947. In 1948 she was renamed again as Tanya and then in 1949, Medex. She last appeared on Lloyd's Register in 1952. The ship was laid up at Marseille before being broken up at La Seyne beginning on 22 January 1952.
