= German submarine U-224 =

German World War II submarine

Coordinates: 36°28′N 0°49′E

History

Nazi Germany
- Name: U-224
- Ordered: 15 August 1940
- Builder: Germaniawerft, Kiel
- Cost: 4,439,000 Reichsmark
- Yard number: 654
- Laid down: 15 July 1941
- Launched: 7 May 1942
- Commissioned: 20 June 1942
- Fate: Sunk 13 January 1943

General characteristics
- Class & type: Type VIIC submarine
- Displacement: 769 tonnes (757 long tons) surfaced; 871 t (857 long tons) submerged
- Length: 67.10 m (220 ft 2 in) o/a; 50.50 m (165 ft 8 in) pressure hull
- Beam: 6.20 m (20 ft 4 in) o/a; 4.70 m (15 ft 5 in) pressure hull
- Height: 9.60 m (31 ft 6 in)
- Draught: 4.74 m (15 ft 7 in)
- Installed power: 2,800–3,200 PS (2,100–2,400 kW; 2,800–3,200 bhp) (diesels); 750 PS (550 kW; 740 shp) (electric)
- Propulsion: 2 shafts; 2 × diesel engines; 2 × electric motors
- Speed: 17.7 knots (32.8 km/h; 20.4 mph) surfaced; 7.6 knots (14.1 km/h; 8.7 mph) submerged
- Range: 8,500 nmi (15,700 km; 9,800 mi) at 10 knots (19 km/h; 12 mph) surfaced; 80 nmi (150 km; 92 mi) at 4 knots (7.4 km/h; 4.6 mph) submerged
- Test depth: 230 m (750 ft); Crush depth: 250–295 m (820–968 ft)
- Complement: 4 officers, 40–56 enlisted
- Armament: 5 × 53.3 cm (21 in) torpedo tubes (four bow, one stern); 14 × torpedoes or 26 TMA mines; 1 × 8.8 cm (3.46 in) deck gun (220 rounds); 1 x 2 cm (0.79 in) C/30 AA gun

Service record
- Part of: 5th U-boat Flotilla; 20 June – 31 October 1942; 7th U-boat Flotilla; 1 November 1942 – 13 January 1943
- Identification codes: M 05 768
- Commanders: Oblt.z.S. Hans-Karl Kosbadt; 20 June 1942 – 13 January 1943
- Operations: 2 patrols: 1st patrol: 17 October – 9 December 1942; 2nd patrol: 3 – 13 January 1943
- Victories: 2 merchant ships sunk (9,535 GRT)

German submarine U-224 was a Type VIIC U-boat of Nazi Germany's Kriegsmarine during World War II.

Ordered on 15 August 1940 from the Germaniawerft shipyard in Kiel, she was laid down on 15 July 1941 as yard number 654, launched on 7 May 1942 and commissioned on 20 June.

U-224 was attacked with depth charges and rammed by Canadian corvette HMCS Ville de Quebec west of Algiers on 13 January 1943. 45 crew members died when the boat sank.

== Design ==
German Type VIIC submarines were preceded by the shorter Type VIIB submarines. U-224 had a displacement of 769 tonnes (757 long tons) when at the surface and 871 tonnes (857 long tons) while submerged. She had a total length of 220 ft 2 in (67.11 m), a pressure hull length of 165 ft 8 in (50.50 m), a beam of 20 ft 4 in (6.20 m), a height of 31 ft 6 in (9.60 m), and a draught of 15 ft 7 in (4.75 m). The submarine was powered by two Germaniawerft F 46 four-stroke, six-cylinder supercharged diesel engines producing a total of 2,800 to 3,200 metric horsepower (2,100 to 2,400 kW; 2,800 to 3,200 shp) for use while surfaced, two AEG double-acting electric motors producing a total of 750 metric horsepower (550 kW; 740 shp) for use while submerged. She had two shafts and two 1.23 m (4.0 ft) propellers. The boat was capable of operating at depths of up to 230 metres (750 ft).

The submarine had a maximum surface speed of 17.7 knots (32.8 km/h; 20.4 mph) and a maximum submerged speed of 7.6 knots (14.1 km/h; 8.7 mph). When submerged, the boat could operate for 80 nautical miles (150 km; 92 mi) at 4 knots (7.4 km/h; 4.6 mph); when surfaced, she could travel 8,500 nautical miles (15,700 km; 9,800 mi) at 10 knots (19 km/h; 12 mph). U-224 was fitted with five 21 inches (53 cm) torpedo tubes (four fitted at the bow and one at the stern), fourteen torpedoes, one 8.8 centimetres (3.5 in) deck machine gun, 220 rounds, and a 2 cm (0.79 in) C/30 anti-aircraft gun. The boat had a complement of between forty-four and sixty.

== Wolfpacks ==
U-224 took part in three wolfpacks, namely:

- Puma (26 – 29 October 1942)
- Natter (30 October – 8 November 1942)
- Kreuzotter (8 – 18 November 1942)

== Summary of raiding history ==
Date	Ship Name	Nationality	Tonnage (GRT)	Fate
29 October 1942	Bic Island	Canada	3,921	Sunk
12 November 1942	Buchanan	Panama	5,614	Sunk

== See also ==
- Mediterranean U-boat Campaign (World War II)

== Bibliography ==
- Busch, Rainer; Röll, Hans-Joachim (1999). German U-boat commanders of World War II : a biographical dictionary. Translated by Brooks, Geoffrey. London, Annapolis, Md: Greenhill Books, Naval Institute Press. ISBN 1-55750-186-6.
- Busch, Rainer; Röll, Hans-Joachim (1999). Deutsche U-Boot-Verluste von September 1939 bis Mai 1945 [German U-boat losses from September 1939 to May 1945]. Der U-Boot-Krieg (in German). Vol. IV. Hamburg, Berlin, Bonn: Mittler. ISBN 3-8132-0514-2.
- Gröner, Erich; Jung, Dieter; Maass, Martin (1991). U-boats and Mine Warfare Vessels. German Warships 1815–1945. Vol. 2. Translated by Thomas, Keith; Magowan, Rachel. London: Conway Maritime Press. ISBN 0-85177-593-4.
